= Colorado State Highway 392 =

State highway in Colorado, United States

State Highway 392
- SH 392 highlighted in red

Route information
- Maintained by CDOT
- Length: 45.33 mi (72.95 km)

Major junctions
- West end: US 287 in Fort Collins
- I-25 / US 87 west of Windsor; SH 257 in Windsor; US 85 in Lucerne
- East end: SH 14 in Briggsdale

Location
- Country: United States
- State: Colorado
- Counties: Larimer, Weld

Highway system
- Colorado State Highway System; Interstate; US; State; Scenic
← SH 391	→ SH 394

State Highway 392 (SH 392) is a 45.33 mi (73.0 km) state highway in Larimer and Weld counties in Colorado, United States, that connects U.S. Route 287 (US 287) on the southern edge of Fort Collins with Colorado State Highway 14 (SH 14) in Briggsdale.

== Route description ==
SH 392 begins at a T intersection with US 287 on the southern city limits of Fort Collins in Larimer County, southwest of Robert Benson Lake. From its western terminus, SH 392 heads east as Carpenter Road to cross County Road 13 (South Lemay Avenue) and County Road 11 (South Timberline Road), where it briefly enters Redmond before entering the Fossil Creek Regional Open Space, along which is located the Fossil Creek Reservoir. As the road continues eastward through the park, it becomes the southern boundary before a diamond interchange at (Exit 262) with Interstate 25/U.S. Route 87 (I-25/US 87).

East of I-25/US 87, the SH 392 briefly continues through farmland before crossing the Larimer–Weld county line. Afterwards, it begins a brief concurrency with SH 257 within Windsor and passing just south of Windsor Lake. SH 392 then continues through rectangularly shaped fields before crossing US 85, where it curves slightly southeastward. As the road continues eastward, the fields become circular, and the road turns slightly northeastward. The surrounding land then becomes barren grassland as the road abruptly turns eastward then sharply northward. The SH 392 then meets its terminus several miles later at SH 14 on the northwestern edge of Briggsdale. The roadway continues north as County Road 77.

== History ==
The route was established in 1949, where it began at SH 257 in Windsor and continued east to Barnesville. The road was then paved entirely by 1958, then extended to today's I-25/US 87 in 1960. The route was then extended east to Cornish; this section was paved by 1977. The route was then extended to its current eastern terminus at Briggsdale at SH 14 the next year. In 1994, the section east of the former SH 37 was deleted.

In 2007, the section between US 287 and I-25/US 87 was added to SH 392 and the formerly deleted section eastern was re-added.

== Major intersections ==
County	Location	mi	km	Destinations	Notes
Larimer	Fort Collins	95.31	153.39	US 287 north (South College Avenue) – Laporte, Virginia Dale, Laramie (Wyoming) US 287 south (South College Avenue) – Loveland	Western terminus; T intersection
Larimer		100.00	160.93	I-25 north (Dwight D. Eisenhower Highway) / US 87 north – Fort Collins, Cheyenne (Wyoming) I-25 south (Dwight D. Eisenhower Highway) / US 87 south – Loveland, Denver	Diamond interchange; I-25 Exit 262
Weld	Windsor	104.45	168.10	SH 257 north (Seventh Street) – Severance, SH 14 CR 17 south (Seventh Street) – Greeley	Western end of SH 257 concurrency
Weld	Windsor	105.43	169.67	CR 19 north (Hollister Lake Road) – CR 74 SH 257 south – Greeley, Milliken	Eastern end of SH 257 concurrency
Weld	Lucerne	115.40	185.72	US 85 north – Eaton, Cheyenne (Wyoming) US 85 south – Greeley, Denver	
Weld				CR 55 north – CR 80 CR 55 south – Gill, Kersey	Southbound CR 55 formerly SH 37
Weld	Briggsdale	141.58	227.85	SH 14 east – Raymer, Sterling SH 14 west – Ault, Fort Collins	Eastern terminus
Weld	Briggsdale	141.58	227.85	CR 77 north – Grover, Hereford	Continuation north from eastern terminus
1.000 mi = 1.609 km; 1.000 km = 0.621 mi: Concurrency terminus

== See also ==
- List of state highways in Colorado
