= North Front Range Metropolitan Planning Organization =

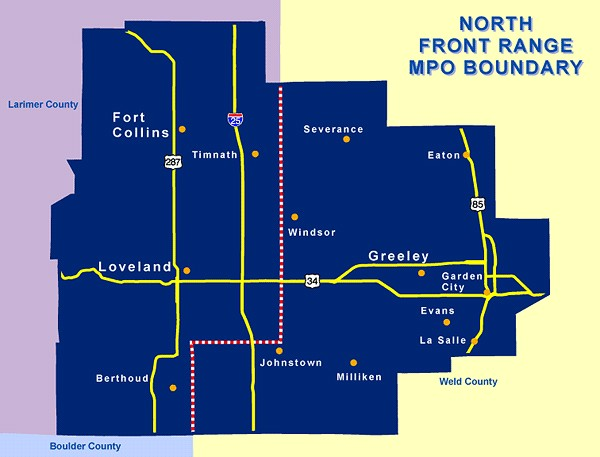
Map of NFR MPO Boundary

The North Front Range Metropolitan Planning Organization (NFRMPO) is an association of 15 local governments working together to improve regional transportation and air quality. The NFRMPO does long-range and short-range planning, and prioritizes which projects in those plans will receive state and federal funding. The goal of the NFRMPO is to enhance air quality and mobility among northern Colorado communities, and between the North Front Range and the Denver Metro area, by developing cooperative working relationships and financial partnerships among its member governments: Berthoud, Eaton, Evans, Fort Collins, Garden City, Greeley, Johnstown, Larimer County, LaSalle, Loveland, Milliken, Severance, Timnath, Weld County, and Windsor, the Colorado Department of Transportation (CDOT), Federal Highway Administration, the Federal Transit Administration (FTA), and the private sector, giving local governments a voice in regional transportation planning.

== History ==
For almost 20 years, the NFRMPO has worked to promote a regional perspective on one of the most pressing issues facing the North Front Range: transportation.

Governor Roy Romer created the North Front Range Metropolitan Planning Organization in 1988 with nine members. Five years later, four other towns joined the organization, giving the MPO 13 members: Larimer County, Weld County, Berthoud, Evans, Fort Collins, Garden City, Greeley, Johnstown, LaSalle, Loveland, Milliken, Timnath and Windsor. In 2007, Eaton and Severance also joined the membership.

In 1993, the Governor designated the NFRMPO Planning Council as the lead air quality planning organization for the North Front Range, giving it additional responsibilities in transportation related air quality planning.

NFRMPO is a nonprofit public organization funded through federal and state grants, and local funds. The goal of the NFRMPO is to enhance air quality and mobility among northern Colorado communities, and between the North Front Range and the Denver Metro, by developing cooperative working relationships and financial partnerships among its member governments, the Colorado Department of Transportation (CDOT), Federal Highway Administration (FHWA), the Federal Transit Administration (FTA), and the private sector.

== See also ==
- Colorado census statistical areas
- Colorado Department of Transportation
- Colorado metropolitan areas
- metropolitan planning organization
- State of Colorado
