= Colorado State Highway 257 =

State highway in Weld County, Colorado, United States

State Highway 257
- SH 257 highlighted in red

Route information
- Maintained by CDOT
- Length: 18.478 mi (29.737 km)
- Existed: 1939–present

Major junctions
- South end: SH 60 in Milliken
- US 34 in Greeley; SH 392 in Windsor
- North end: SH 14 in Severance

Location
- Country: United States
- State: Colorado
- Counties: Weld

Highway system
- Colorado State Highway System; Interstate; US; State; Scenic
← SH 239	→ SH 263

State Highway 257 (SH 257) is an 18.478-mile (29.737 km) state highway in the Front Range in Weld County, Colorado, United States, connecting SH 60 in Milliken with SH 14 in northwestern Severance.

== Route description ==
SH 257 begins at a junction with SH 60 and County Road 21 (CR 21) northwest of central Milliken. It then heads northward, crossing the Big Thompson River, a tributary of the South Platte River, before entering western Greeley.

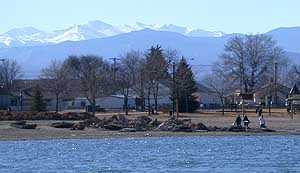
The snow-capped peaks of the Front Range, March 2005. Also visible is a bike path near SH 257 in Windsor.

In Greeley, SH 257 has two interchanges: one with U.S. Route 34 (US 34) and one with U.S. Route 34 Business (US 34 Bus.). Because the junction with US 34 Bus. is so close to its terminus, the two interchanges are just 0.3 miles (0.48 km) apart. Both are diamond interchanges, but only the US 34 intersection has complete access.

SH 257 then heads northwards before turning northwest, crossing over the Cache la Poudre River and entering Windsor. It abruptly turns west and begins a concurrency with intersects Colorado State Highway 392 (SH 392) along Main Street. About one mile (1.6 km) later, SH 257 turns back northward along 7th Street, ending its concurrency with SH 392. SH 257 then heads north to SH 14, where it terminates at the town limits of northwestern Severance.

== History ==
The route was established in 1939 with several differences. The route went north to Windsor from Milliken, then turning west to Colorado State Highway 185 (SH 185). SH 185 was then deleted and replaced with Interstate 25 (I‑25), and SH 257 was readjusted so that it went north to SH 14. The route was paved by 1954. A spur south of Windsor was eliminated a year later. The interchanges at US 24 and US 34 Bus. were built in 1998.

In November 2009, a new traffic signal was installed at the intersection with Garden Drive in Windsor. The construction cost about $350,000.

== Major intersections ==
The entire route is in Weld County.

Location	mi	km	Destinations	Notes
Milliken	0.000	0.000	SH 60 – Milliken, Johnstown CR 21 south (North Quentine Avenue)	Southern terminus; roadway continues as CR 21
Greeley	5.124	8.246	US 34 – Greeley, Fort Morgan, Loveland	Diamond interchange
Greeley	5.423	8.727	US 34 Bus. east (West 10th Street) – Greeley	Access to US 34 Bus. eastbound only
Windsor	10.595	17.051	SH 392 east (Main Street) – Lucerne	Southern end of SH 392 concurrency
Windsor	11.580	18.636	SH 392 west (Main Street)	Northern end of SH 392 concurrency
Severance	18.487	29.752	SH 14 – Ault, Fort Collins CR 17 north	Northern terminus; roadway continues as CR 17
1.000 mi = 1.609 km; 1.000 km = 0.621 mi: Concurrency terminus; Incomplete access

== Related route ==
State Highway 257 Spur
- Location: Weld County
- Length: 1.1 mi (1.8 km)

State Highway 257 Spur (SH 257 Spur) was a 1.1-mile (1.8 km) state highway business route in Weld County. It was a spur east from SH 257 to US 34 Bus. west of Greeley. The road no longer connects to SH 257 since it was barricaded off.

The entire route is in Greeley, Weld County.

mi	km	Destinations	Notes
0.000	0.000	SH 257 – Windsor	Western terminus
1.1	1.8	US 34 Bus. east – Greeley	Eastern terminus
1.000 mi = 1.609 km; 1.000 km = 0.621 mi: Closed/former
