= Cornish, Colorado =

Unincorporated community in Colorado, US

- Unincorporated community
- Location of Cornish, Colorado. Cornish (Colorado)
- Coordinates: 40°31′23″N 104°24′48″W
- Country: United States
- State: Colorado
- County: Weld

Government
  - Type: unincorporated community
  - Body: Weld County
- Elevation: 4,715 ft (1,437 m)
- Time zone: UTC−07:00 (MST)
  - Summer (DST): UTC−06:00 (MDT)
- ZIP code: (Gill) 80624
- Area codes: 970/748
- GNIS place ID: 180559

Cornish is an unincorporated community in Weld County, in the U.S. state of Colorado.

== History ==
The Cornish, Colorado, post office operated from November 24, 1914, until March 31, 1967. The Gill, Colorado, post office (ZIP code 80624) now serves the area. The community was named after a Mr. Cornish, an engineer employed by the Union Pacific Railroad.

A railway was built through Cornish sometime in the early 1900s, as part of a line from Greeley to Briggsdale. The Union Pacific Railroad filed for the abandonment of the line in 1942, with the actual abandonment occurring in 1946.
