= Colorado State Highway 60 =

State highway in Colorado, United States

State Highway 60
- SH 60 highlighted in red

Route information
- Maintained by CDOT
- Length: 20.203 mi (32.514 km)

Major junctions
- West end: US 287 in Campion
- I-25 near Campion
- East end: US 85 in Houston

Location
- Country: United States
- State: Colorado
- Counties: Larimer, Weld

Highway system
- Colorado State Highway System; Interstate; US; State; Scenic
| ← SH 59 | → SH 61 |

State Highway 60 (SH 60) is a state highway in Colorado that connects Campion, Johnstown and Milliken. SH 60's western terminus is at U.S. Route 287 (US 287) in Campion, and the eastern terminus is at US 85 in Houston.

== Route description ==
SH 60 begins at US 287 in Campion. Continuing east, the route passes under Interstate 25 (I-25) before jumping south to I-25's exit 252 diamond interchange and continuing eastbound. SH 60 then passes through Johnstown as First Street before intersecting SH 257 and entering Milliken as Broad Street. 2 mi (3.2 km) east of Milliken, the route abruptly turns south before crossing the South Platte River and terminating at US 85 in the unorganized community of Houston.

== History ==
The route was established in the early 1920's, having much of the same routing as it does today. The route was paved from Johnstown to US 85 by 1939 and was entirely paved by 1946. When I-25 was completed in the area in the early 1960's, SH 60 was split in two, having not been given an exit for the northern section.

== Major intersections ==
| County | Location | mi | km | Destinations | Notes |
|---|---|---|---|---|---|
| Larimer | Campion | 0.000 | 0.000 | US 287 (Lincoln Avenue) | Western terminus |
| Larimer–Weld county line | | 4.968 | 7.995 | Frontage Road to I-25 | Eastern terminus of western section |
Gap in route
| Weld | | 5.869 | 9.445 | I-25 – Denver, Fort Collins | I-25 exit 252; western terminus of eastern section |
| Weld | Milliken | 11.853 | 19.076 | SH 257 north (Quentine Avenue) – Windsor | Southern terminus of SH 257 |
| Weld | Houston | 20.203 | 32.514 | US 85 – Brighton, Greeley | Eastern terminus |
1.000 mi = 1.609 km; 1.000 km = 0.621 mi
