= Lewis Ledyard Weld =

American politician

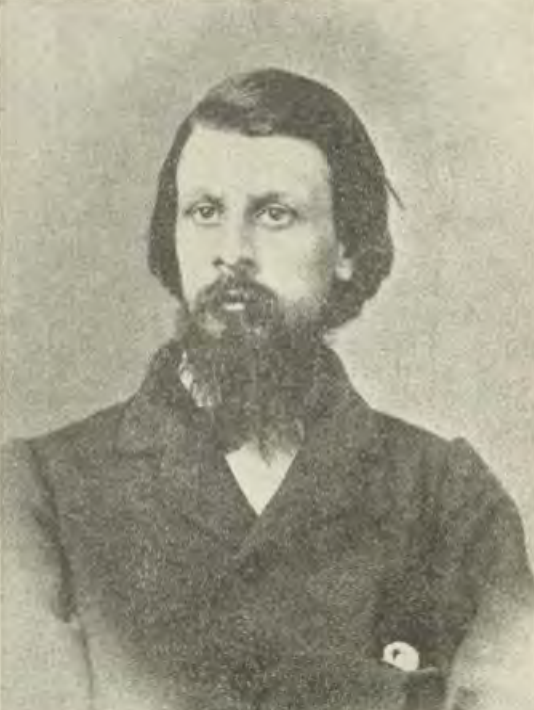

1st Secretary of State of Colorado
- In office 1861–1862
- Preceded by: Position established
- Succeeded by: Samuel Hitt Elbert

Personal details
- Born: May 13, 1833 Hartford, Connecticut, US
- Died: January 10, 1865 (aged 31) Baltimore, Maryland, US
- Education: Yale College

Military service
- Allegiance: United States
- Branch/service: United States Army
- Unit: United States Colored Troops; Army of the James

Lewis Ledyard Weld (May 13, 1833 – January 10, 1865) was an American lawyer, politician, and Union Army officer.

Weld, the third son of Lewis Weld, was born in Hartford, Connecticut, May 13, 1833.

He graduated from Yale College in 1854. After two years spent in teaching, he pursued the study of law in Cleveland, Ohio and New York City, and he was subsequently admitted to the bar in 1857. In 1858-1859 he was settled as an Attorney at Leavenworth, Kansas, and he took strong opposition to the Lecompton Constitution. Afterward, he moved to the neighborhood of Pike's Peak, settled in Denver, Colorado, and continued the practice of his profession.

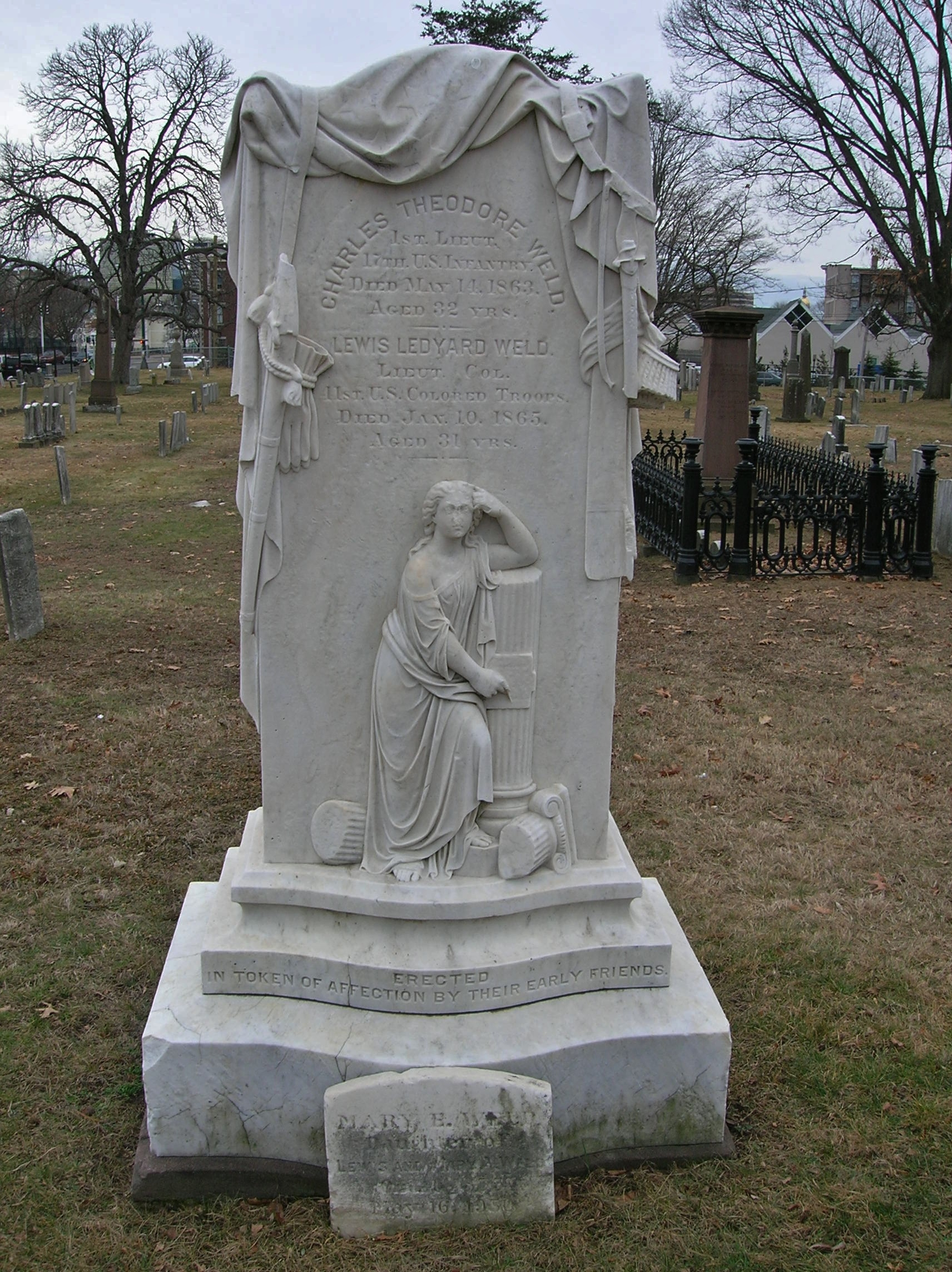
Monument to Charles and Lewis Weld

When the Colorado Territory was organized in 1861, he was made the Secretary of State of Colorado, and was, for some time, the Acting Governor, exerting a powerful influence for the maintenance of the national authority. He is the namesake of Weld County, Colorado.

In 1862, he resigned his office, aiming to engage in military service. While awaiting a suitable opportunity he edited the Denver Commonwealth newspaper. In Oct 1863, he passed the examining board as Major, and subsequently became Lieutenant Colonel of the 41st U.S. Colored Troops. He served in Maryland, South Carolina, Florida, and in the Army of the James before Richmond, Virginia, where he died Jan. 10, 1865, from an acute disease brought on by exposure.

Lewis' brother, Charles Theodore Weld, also served in the Civil War. Charles died in May 1863 of wounds he suffered during the Battle of Chancellorsville in Virginia. A memorial to both brothers was erected in Hartford's Old North Cemetery in 1865.

This article incorporates public domain material from the Yale Obituary Record.
