= List of Colorado area codes =

Coordinates: 38.9972°N 105.5478°W

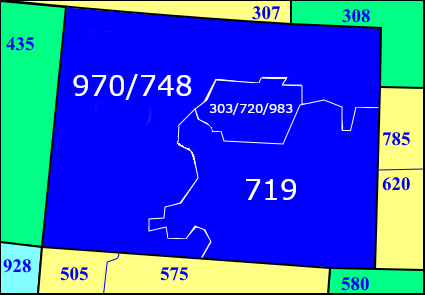
Numbering plan areas of Colorado (blue) and area codes.

The U.S. state of Colorado is divided into three geographically distinct numbering plan areas in the North American Numbering Plan (NANP), with a total of six area codes.

Area code	Year	Parent NPA	Overlay	Numbering plan area
303	1947	–	303/720/983	Greater Denver Metropolitan Area
720	1998	–	303/720/983	Greater Denver Metropolitan Area
983	2022	–	303/720/983	Greater Denver Metropolitan Area
719	1988	303	–	southeastern, east central, and south central Colorado
748	2025	970	748/970	northern and western Colorado
970	1995	303	748/970	northern and western Colorado

== History ==
Area code 303 is one of the original North American area codes of 1947, then assigned to the entire state of Colorado. It remained the state's sole area code for forty years.

Colorado's growth in the second half of the 20th century, particularly in the Denver-Boulder area, created a shortage of numbering resources, so that relief planning was initiated in 1987. On March 5, 1988, southeastern Colorado, including Colorado Springs and Pueblo, was split from 303 and received area code 719.

This was intended as a long-term solution, but within five years further demand for numbers from the proliferation of cell phones and pagers (especially in and around Denver) forced another split. Numbering plan area 303 was divided on April 2, 1995 and the northeastern and western parts, including Fort Collins, Grand Junction, Vail, and Aspen received area code 970. This split reduced 303 to the Denver-Boulder area. With the 1995 split, 303 was the only Colorado area code that did not border another state.

Within two years, continued growth in the Front Range made further relief necessary. The Front Range is home not only to most of Colorado's landlines, but also most of the state's cell phones, fax machines, and pagers. On September 1, 1998, area code 720 was activated in the 303 service area in creation of an overlay complex.

In 2020, the North American Numbering Plan Administrator estimated that the Denver metropolitan area would reach numbering exhaustion again by 2023. On May 21, 2021, the Colorado Public Utilities Commission approved an additional area code, 983, for the 303/720 overlay. Area code 983 was activated on June 17, 2022. This addition resulted in 23.8 million numbers being assigned to an area of about 3.5 million people.

In 2023, the North American Numbering Plan Administrator estimated that area code 970 would reach exhaustion mitigation levels by 2026. On December 18, 2023, the Colorado Public Utilities Commission approved the addition of area code 748 for an overlay with NPA 970. Area code 748 was activated on July 7, 2025. No central office codes of 748 are allowed to be installed before complete exhaustion of area code 970.

== See also ==
- List of North American Numbering Plan area codes
