= Hereford, Colorado =

Unincorporated community in Weld County, CO, USA

- Unincorporated community
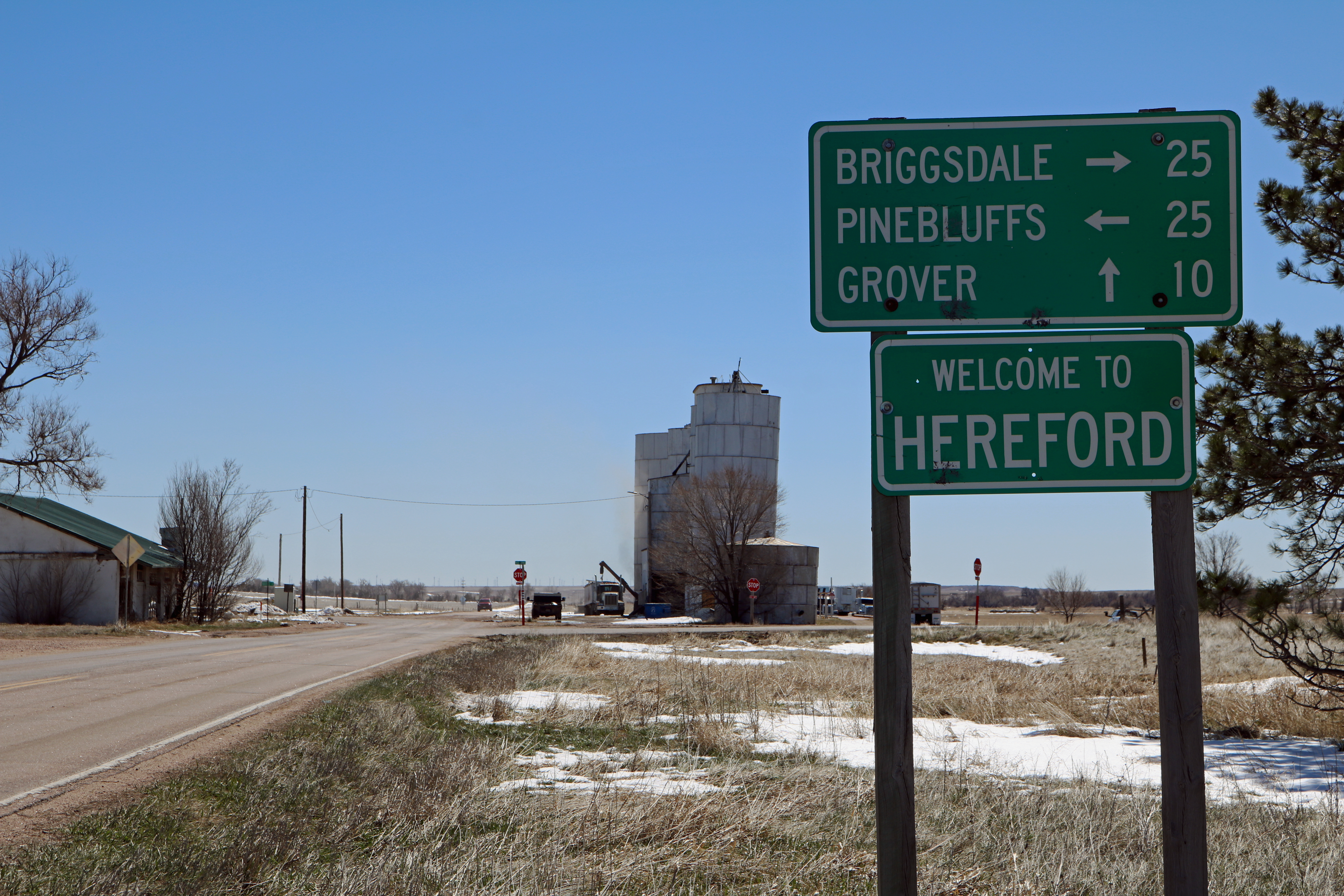
- The welcome sign in Hereford.
- Interactive map of Hereford, Colorado
- Coordinates: 40°58′30″N 104°18′21″W
- Country: United States
- State: Colorado
- Counties: Weld
- Elevation: 5,279 ft (1,609 m)
- Time zone: UTC-7 (MST)
  - Summer (DST): UTC-6 (MDT)
- ZIP code: 80732
- Area code: 970
- GNIS place ID: 204649

Hereford is an unincorporated community and a U.S. Post Office in Weld County, Colorado, United States. The Hereford Post Office has the ZIP Code 80732.
