= Johnstown, Colorado =

Town in Weld and Larimer counties in Colorado, United States

- Home rule municipality
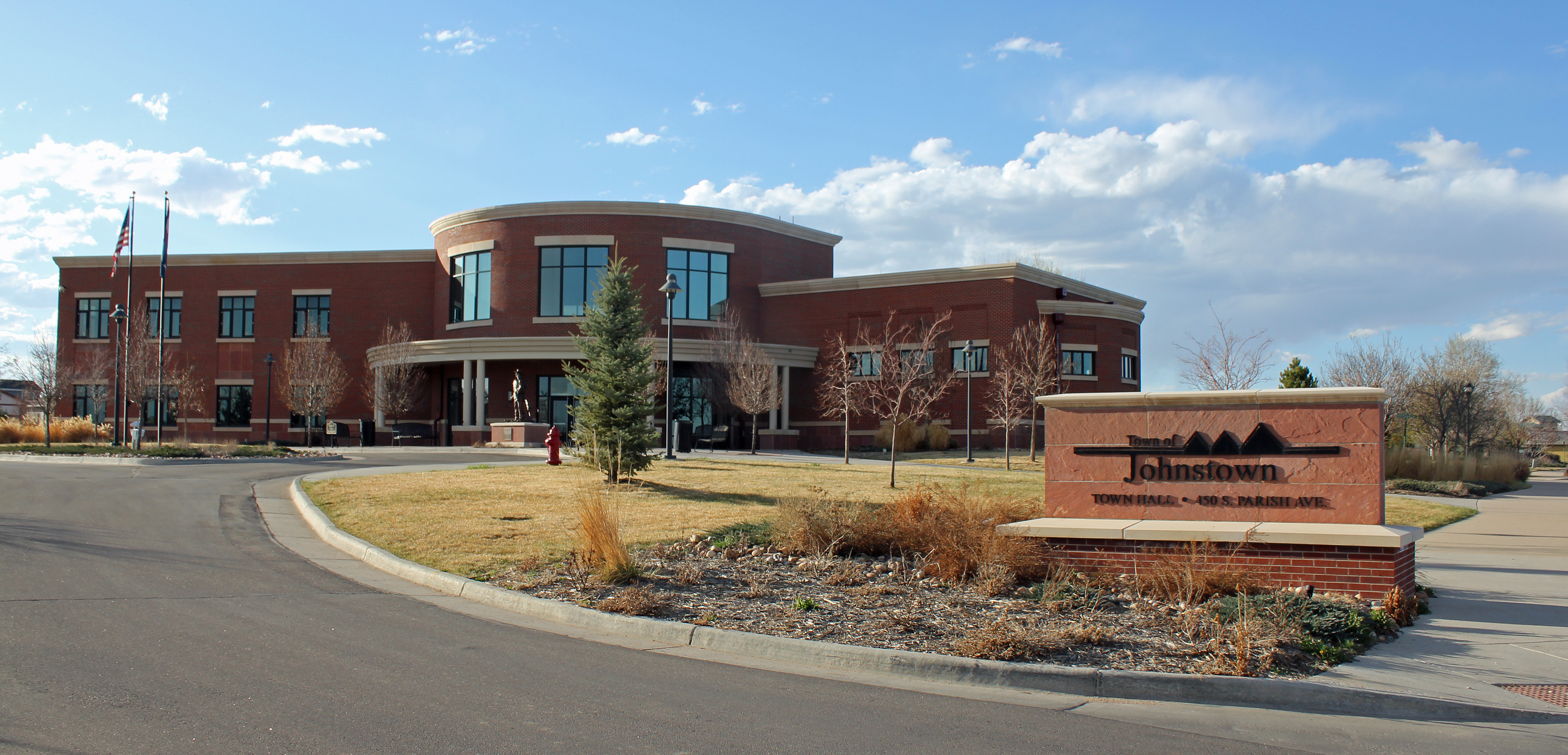
- Town Hall
- Motto: Community that Cares
- Location of Johnstown in Larimer County and Weld County, Colorado.
- Coordinates: 40°22′23″N 104°59′14″W
- Country: United States
- State: Colorado
- Counties: Larimer, Weld
- Platted: 1902
- Incorporated (town): May 13, 1907

Government
  - Type: Home Rule Municipality

Area
  - Total: 13.84 sq mi (35.84 km^{2})
  - Land: 13.75 sq mi (35.62 km^{2})
  - Water: 0.085 sq mi (0.22 km^{2})
- Elevation: 4,994 ft (1,522 m)

Population (2020)
  - Total: 17,303
  - Estimate (2025): 22,433
  - Density: 1,258/sq mi (485.8/km^{2})
- Time zone: UTC-7 (Mountain (MST))
  - Summer (DST): UTC-6 (MDT)
- ZIP code: 80534
- Area code: 970
- FIPS code: 08-39855
- GNIS feature ID: 2412807
- Website: Town of Johnstown

Johnstown is a home rule municipality in Weld and Larimer counties in the U.S. state of Colorado. The population was 17,303 at the 2020 United States census.

== History ==
The Town of Johnstown began with the vision of Harvey J. Parish before its platting in 1902. Parish had homesteaded along the Little Thompson River in 1883 and is credited with the building of the Hillsboro Ditch, which helped bring irrigated farming to the district. He sat on the Weld County Board of Commissioners from 1893 to 1902. When Parish realized that the Great Western Railway was building close to his homestead, he purchased land for $11/acre and platted the land that would later be known as Johnstown. The original plat of Johnstown contained no more than 10 acres. Lots were 25'x140' with 20' alleys. Johnstown's main street, now known as Parish Avenue, was originally named Greeley Avenue Public Road.

Platted in November 1902 and incorporated on May 13, 1907 when it had about 150 residents, Johnstown was named for Parish's seven-year-old son, John, who had been hospitalized with a ruptured appendix. John's father reportedly urged him to "hurry up and get well" because their town was being named in his honor. When asked what he would call his new Town, he replied, "It will be my son's town. Let's call it John's Town." In addition to naming the town after his son, Charlotte Street, Rutherford Avenue, and Raymond Avenue were named after his other children (Charlotte Belle, Rutherford Jay, Charles Raymond).

Parish was elected as the town's first mayor, serving from 1907 to somewhere between late 1908 and 1911. His son, John Parish, would later serve as mayor from 1929 to 1934.

=== Early development ===
The town's first business, the Fairbairn-Parish Lumber and Mercantile Company, opened in October 1902. A post office was established in the following year, and 1904 saw the arrival of the first school building, a Methodist church, and the Johnstown Breeze newspaper.

In 1905, residents discussed relocating the town east to the site of Hillsboro (later Milliken, Colorado) because a proposed railroad that would have bypassed Johnstown. The railroad was a failure and the town stayed put.

Parish opposed alcohol consumption, and each lot he sold in the original townsite came with a clause which barred the manufacture or sale of liquor at any public establishment which sat on the property. The restriction applied only to properties west of Parish Avenue, including the west side of the street itself. The business lots on the east side of the street were owned by the railroad, which did not place such restrictions on them. This split between a "wet" side and a "dry" side lasted until the 1980s.

=== Agrictulture and industry ===
In addition to being credited with the construction of the Hillsboro Ditch, he was also president of the Hillsboro Ditch Company for 20 years and a major financial backer of the Big Cut Lateral Ditch Company. The town grew out of the Great Western Sugar Company's development of the sugar beet industry in north-central Colorado. A subsidiary of the company, the Great Western Railway of Colorado, carried beets from local dumps to its processing plants.

In 1910, local businessmen and farmers organized the Colorado Condensed Milk Company, which was to be taken over by The Mohawk Condensed Milk Company once local dairy farmers were delivering enough milk to the plant each day. To meet the demand, a large number of dairy cows were shipped to local farmers from Wisconsin and Minnesota. The facility was overseen by Mohawk for several years until 1921 when the Carnation Milk Company bought out Mohawk. The plant closed in 1977 after 66 years of operation.

Great Western began construction of a beet sugar factory between Johnstown and Milliken in 1920 along what would later become Colorado State Highway 60, but that same December the project was called off. The factory was later built as a molasses extraction facility.The factory opened on October 28, 1926, and was attended by 1,800 visitors. During WWII, the factory was closed down when the government confiscated molasses for the production of alcohol for the war effort, and the sugar warehouse and adjacent grounds were converted into a Prisoner-of-war camp. In 1954, a monosodium glutamate plant was erected at the plant site. The molasses plant ceased operation in 1977 and was subsequently torn down in 1988. The MSG plant was converted to produce high-fructose corn syrup until it stopped production in 1983.

=== Commerce ===
Johnstown's early business district developed along Parish Avenue. The town's first drug store, Reeder & Ballentine, operated for roughly 10 years from 1906 to 1916. The Eureka Mercantile Company was built in 1907 by William Parkin, and the W. H. McCormick Mercantile Company of Berthoud opened a branch in Johnstown in 1909. The town's longstanding newspaper, the Johnstown Breeze, was founded in 1904 by J. Gordon Smith, and is still published, holding the title of the town's longest-running business.

The town's first bank was founded in 1904 by Willard E. Letford and T. M. Callahan, originally as a private bank before it became the First National Bank of Johnstown in December 1907. A competitor, the Johnstown State Bank, opened in 1916 but closed after only two years, with the First National Bank of Johnstown acquiring the building. The First National Bank of Johnstown remained operational until it was acquired by Union Colony Bank in 2000.

=== Johnstown meteorite ===
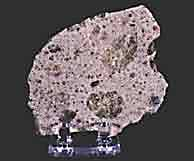
The Johnstown diogenite meteorite.

A meteorite fall in the adjacent former town of Elwell on the afternoon of July 6, 1924, became known as the Johnstown meteorite. It was notable with a number of large pieces of the broken-up asteroid recovered, including one of 23.5 kg (52 lb) that impacted into the Earth to a depth of 1.7 m (5.5 ft). The meteorite fell during an outdoor funeral service with more than 200 people attending who witnessed the event or heard the several stones falling. The meteorite is classified as an "achondrite stony meteorite of the diogenite class in the HED group" of meteorites that are believed to have hived off of the asteroid Vesta approximately one billion years ago.

== Geography ==
Johnstown is located just west of the confluence of the Big Thompson River and the Little Thompson River. Greeley is about ten miles to the east-northeast and Loveland is approximately nine miles to the northwest.

According to the United States Census Bureau, the town in 2010 had a total area of 13.52 square miles (35.0 km^{2}).

== Demographics ==
Historical population
| Census | Pop. | Note | %± |
|---|---|---|---|
| 1910 | 198 | | — |
| 1920 | 274 | | 38.4% |
| 1930 | 767 | | 179.9% |
| 1940 | 961 | | 25.3% |
| 1950 | 897 | | −6.7% |
| 1960 | 976 | | 8.8% |
| 1970 | 1,191 | | 22.0% |
| 1980 | 1,535 | | 28.9% |
| 1990 | 1,579 | | 2.9% |
| 2000 | 3,827 | | 142.4% |
| 2010 | 9,887 | | 158.3% |
| 2020 | 17,303 | | 75.0% |
| 2025 (est.) | 22,433 | ▲ | 29.6% |

=== 2020 census ===
As of the 2020 census, Johnstown had a population of 17,303. The median age was 35.3 years. 26.3% of residents were under the age of 18 and 11.5% of residents were 65 years of age or older. For every 100 females there were 101.3 males, and for every 100 females age 18 and over there were 101.3 males age 18 and over.

97.0% of residents lived in urban areas, while 3.0% lived in rural areas.

There were 6,185 households in Johnstown, of which 39.4% had children under the age of 18 living in them. Of all households, 62.4% were married-couple households, 14.8% were households with a male householder and no spouse or partner present, and 15.9% were households with a female householder and no spouse or partner present. About 18.8% of all households were made up of individuals and 5.6% had someone living alone who was 65 years of age or older.

There were 6,434 housing units, of which 3.9% were vacant. The homeowner vacancy rate was 1.0% and the rental vacancy rate was 8.6%.

Racial composition as of the 2020 census
| Race | Number | Percent |
|---|---|---|
| White | 14,070 | 81.3% |
| Black or African American | 131 | 0.8% |
| American Indian and Alaska Native | 149 | 0.9% |
| Asian | 279 | 1.6% |
| Native Hawaiian and Other Pacific Islander | 11 | 0.1% |
| Some other race | 919 | 5.3% |
| Two or more races | 1,744 | 10.1% |
| Hispanic or Latino (of any race) | 2,897 | 16.7% |

=== 2010 census ===
As of the census of 2010, there were 9,887 people, 3,356 households, and 2,738 families residing in the town. The population density was 731.3 inhabitants per square mile (282.4/km^{2}). There were 3,554 housing units at an average density of 262.9 per square mile (101.5/km^{2}). The racial makeup of the town was 91.7% White, 0.8% African American, 1.4% Native American, 1.4% Asian, and 7.3% from other races. Hispanic or Latino of any race were 16.8% of the population.

There were 3,356 households, out of which 42.8% had children under the age of 18 living with them, 69.7% were married couples living together, 7.0% had a female householder with no husband present, and 18.4% were non-families. 13.8% of all households were made up of individuals, and 4.0% had someone living alone who was 65 years of age or older. The average household size was 2.95 and the average family size was 3.25.

In the town, the population was spread out, with 31.2% under the age of 18, 5.8% from 18 to 24, 32.3% from 25 to 44, 22.0% from 45 to 64, and 8.7% who were 65 years of age or older. The median age was 33.7 years. For every 100 females, there were 101.7 males.

=== Income and poverty ===
The median income for a household in the town was $69,919, and the median income for a family was $75,000. Males had a median income of $55,426 versus $40,536 for females. The per capita income for the town was $26,324. About 5.4% of families and 5.9% of the population were below the poverty line, including 6.4% of those under age 18 and 5.1% of those age 65 or over.

== Economy ==
=== Major industry and commercial activity ===
The Town of Johnstown has over 470 businesses that include small family-owned businesses, service companies, high-tech manufacturing, and distribution, as well as national headquarters. Johnstown's economy continues to expand and grow with major companies such Kroger's Fulfillment Center, Buc-ee's Travel Center, and Woods Grocer expanding into the community.

Regional economic development partners include Johnstown Downtown Development Association, Upstate Colorado, Northern Colorado Regional Economic Development Initiative, and Metro Denver Economic Development Corporation.

| Top Employers | Employment |
|---|---|
| Scheel's | 600 |
| Weld County School District, RE-5J | 371 |
| Northern Colorado Long Term Acute Care | 310 |
| FedEx Ground Packaging | 250 |
| Canyon Bakehouse | 250 |
| High Country Beverage | 245 |
| Swire Coca-Cola | 202 |

== Education ==
Johnstown is served by two school districts. The majority of residents fall within Weld County School District RE-5J, though the northwest section of the town falls within Thompson R2-J School District.

=== Johnstown ===
- Letford Elementary School (closed)
- Elwell Elementary School
- Pioneer Ridge Elementary School
- Roosevelt Middle School
- Roosevelt High School (moved)
- Riverview PK-8 School

=== Milliken ===
- Knowledge Quest Academy
- Milliken Middle School (moved)
- Milliken Elementary School (Split by Pre-k To 2nd)
- Milliken Intermediate School (3rd-5th)

== Notable persons ==
- Reed Doughty (NFL player – Washington Commanders). Doughty was raised in Johnstown.
- Brooke Mayo, FIFA soccer assistant referee

== See also ==
- List of municipalities in Colorado
