= Gill, Colorado =

Unincorporated community in Weld County, CO, USA

- Unincorporated community
- Interactive map of Gill, Colorado
- Coordinates: 40°27′15″N 104°32′32″W
- Country: United States
- State: Colorado
- Counties: Weld
- Elevation: 4,685 ft (1,428 m)
- Time zone: UTC-7 (MST)
  - Summer (DST): UTC-6 (MDT)
- ZIP code: 80624
- Area code: 970
- GNIS place ID: 180652

Gill is an unincorporated community and a U.S. Post Office in Weld County, Colorado, United States. The Gill Post Office has the ZIP Code 80624.

A post office called Gill has been in operation since 1910. The community has the name of William H Gill, an early landowner.
