= Severance, Colorado =

Town in the United States

Town of Severance, Colorado
- Town
- Motto: Where the geese fly and the bulls cry
- Location of Severance in Weld County, Colorado.
- Coordinates: 40°31′24″N 104°51′14″W
- Country: United States
- State: Colorado
- County: Weld County
- Founded: 1906
- Incorporated: November 20, 1920

Government
  - Type: Home rule municipality

Area
  - Total: 9.19 sq mi (23.79 km^{2})
  - Land: 9.07 sq mi (23.49 km^{2})
  - Water: 0.12 sq mi (0.31 km^{2})
- Elevation: 4,876 ft (1,486 m)

Population (2020)
  - Total: 7,683
  - Estimate (2025): 11,841
  - Density: 847.1/sq mi (327.1/km^{2})
- Time zone: UTC-7 (Mountain (MST))
  - Summer (DST): UTC-6 (MDT)
- ZIP codes: 80524, 80546 (PO Box), 80550, 80610, 80615
- Area code: 970
- FIPS code: 08-69150
- GNIS feature ID: 2413272
- Website: townofseverance.org

Severance is a home rule municipality in Weld County, Colorado, United States. Its population was 7,683 at the 2020 census., an increase of 142.75% from 2010, with a now estimated population of 11,841. The town is located on the Colorado Eastern Plains, northwest of Greeley. A post office in Severance has been in operation since 1894.

Bruce's Bar, a restaurant located within Severance, has become widely known for serving Rocky Mountain oysters. The town's unofficial motto is a reference to this dish.

== History ==
The community was named after David Severance, a pioneer settler in the area. The town originally applied for its post office to be named Tailholt, but the name was mistakenly changed to Severance when Mr. Severance applied for the post office in 1894.

In the early 1900s, the town of Severance ran a promotional campaign for citizens to farm sugar beets, to build a sugar factory in neighboring Windsor. The campaign succeeded, leading to the creation of the Great Western Sugar Company in 1905.

== Geography ==
The Great Western Bike and Pedestrian Trail runs through the center of the town in a northeast-southwest manner. The path runs along the former route of the Great Western Railway, extending southwest to Windsor and northeast, after bending due east, to Eaton.

== Education ==
The public schools from the Weld RE-4 school district located in Severance are:

- Severance High School
- Severance Middle School
- Rangeview Elementary

== Demographics ==
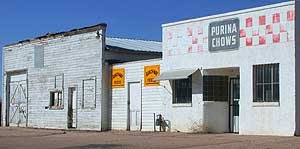
Feed store in Severance. Agriculture remains the primary industry of the town, despite the construction of new residences in recent years.

According to the United States Census Bureau, the town's median household income is $121,047 with 43.6% of residents having received a Bachelor's Degree or Higher.

Historical population
Census	Pop.	Note	%±
1940	138		—
1950	108		−21.7%
1960	70		−35.2%
1970	59		−15.7%
1980	102		72.9%
1990	106		3.9%
2000	597		463.2%
2010	3,165		430.2%
2020	7,683		142.7%
2025 (est.)	11,841	▲	54.1%
U.S. Decennial Census

=== 2020 census ===
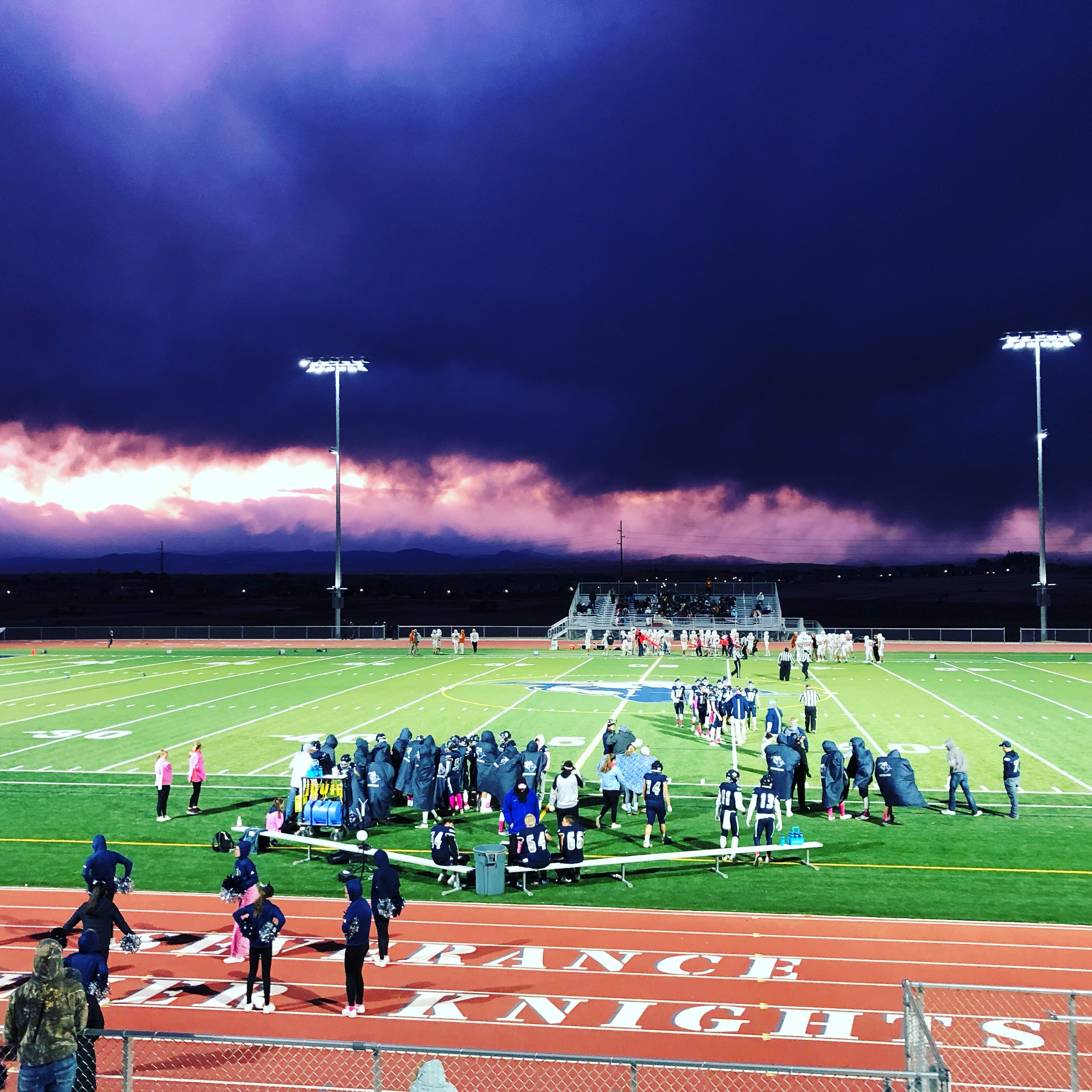
Friday Knight Lights, the first game of the year for the Severance High School Silver Knights

As of the 2020 census, Severance had a population of 7,683. The median age was 32.6 years. 31.2% of residents were under the age of 18 and 8.0% of residents were 65 years of age or older. For every 100 females, there were 101.4 males, and for every 100 females age 18 and over, there were 102.5 males age 18 and over.

82.8% of residents lived in urban areas, while 17.2% lived in rural areas.

There were 2,488 households in Severance, of which 49.4% had children under the age of 18 living in them. Of all households, 72.8% were married-couple households, 10.5% were households with a male householder and no spouse or partner present, and 9.8% were households with a female householder and no spouse or partner present. About 9.6% of all households were made up of individuals and 2.3% had someone living alone who was 65 years of age or older.

There were 2,568 housing units, of which 3.1% were vacant. The homeowner vacancy rate was 2.1% and the rental vacancy rate was 4.6%.

Racial composition as of the 2020 census
Race	Number	Percent
White	6,470	84.2%
Black or African American	61	0.8%
American Indian and Alaska Native	54	0.7%
Asian	78	1.0%
Native Hawaiian and Other Pacific Islander	5	0.1%
Some other race	234	3.0%
Two or more races	781	10.2%
Hispanic or Latino (of any race)	1,085	14.1%

== Governance ==
The town previously had a ban on snowball fights, which was repealed in 2018 after a 9-year-old advocated for the repeal.

== See also ==
- Front Range Urban Corridor
- North Central Colorado Urban Area
- Denver-Aurora-Boulder, CO Combined Statistical Area
- Greeley, CO Metropolitan Statistical Area
