= Lucerne, Colorado =

Unincorporated community in Weld County, CO, USA

- Unincorporated community
- Location in Weld County and the state of Colorado Lucerne, Colorado (the United States)
- Coordinates: 40°28′55″N 104°41′59″W
- Country: United States
- State: Colorado
- County: Weld
- Elevation: 4,751 ft (1,448 m)
- Time zone: UTC-7 (MST)
  - Summer (DST): UTC-6 (MDT)
- ZIP code: 80646
- Area code: 970
- GNIS feature ID: 180640

Lucerne is an unincorporated community and a U.S. Post Office in Weld County, Colorado, United States. The Lucerne Post Office has the ZIP Code 80646.

The post office has been in operation since 1892. The community was named after the lucerne that grew near the original town site.
