= Briggsdale, Colorado =

Census-designated place in Weld County, Colorado, United States

- census-designated place
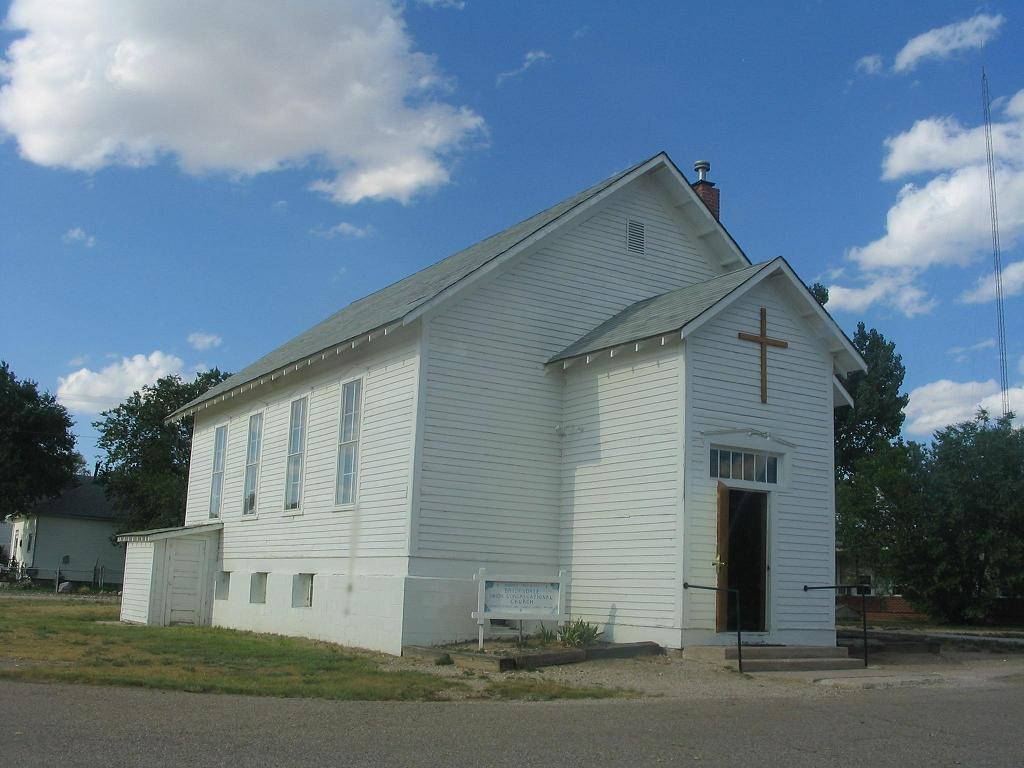
- A church in Briggsdale.

- Location of Briggsdale, Colorado. Briggsdale (Colorado)
- Coordinates: 40°38′09″N 104°19′42″W
- Country: United States
- State: Colorado
- County: Weld
- Established: 1909

Government
  - Type: unincorporated community
  - Body: Weld County

Area
  - Total: 0.650 sq mi (1.683 km^{2})
  - Land: 0.650 sq mi (1.683 km^{2})
  - Water: 0 sq mi (0.000 km^{2})
- Elevation: 4,866 ft (1,483 m)

Population (2020)
  - Total: 134
  - Density: 206/sq mi (79.6/km^{2})
- Time zone: UTC−07:00 (MST)
  - Summer (DST): UTC−06:00 (MDT)
- ZIP code: 80611
- Area code: 970
- GNIS pop ID: 180494
- GNIS CDP ID: 2805927
- FIPS code: 08-08620

Briggsdale is an unincorporated community, a post office, and a census-designated place (CDP) located in Weld County, Colorado, United States. The CDP is a part of the Greeley, CO Metropolitan Statistical Area. The Briggsdale post office has the ZIP Code 80611. At the United States Census 2020, the population of the Briggsdale CDP was 134.

== History ==
Briggsdale was established in 1909. The town was named for Frank N. Briggs, a farmer and one of the founders. The Briggsdale, Colorado, post office opened on August 1, 1910.

== Geography ==
At the 2020 United States Census, the Briggsdale CDP had an area of 416 acres (1.683 km^{2}), all land.

=== Climate ===
Climate data for Briggsdale, Colorado, 1991–2020 normals, extremes 1963–present
Month	Jan	Feb	Mar	Apr	May	Jun	Jul	Aug	Sep	Oct	Nov	Dec	Year
Record high °F (°C)	71 (22)	74 (23)	81 (27)	89 (32)	96 (36)	102 (39)	106 (41)	103 (39)	99 (37)	89 (32)	78 (26)	75 (24)	106 (41)
Mean maximum °F (°C)	61.0 (16.1)	64.5 (18.1)	74.4 (23.6)	80.8 (27.1)	89.6 (32.0)	95.2 (35.1)	99.7 (37.6)	97.4 (36.3)	92.9 (33.8)	83.6 (28.7)	71.9 (22.2)	61.5 (16.4)	100.4 (38.0)
Mean daily maximum °F (°C)	41.4 (5.2)	44.3 (6.8)	54.8 (12.7)	62.0 (16.7)	71.3 (21.8)	83.1 (28.4)	90.0 (32.2)	87.1 (30.6)	78.8 (26.0)	64.9 (18.3)	50.8 (10.4)	40.8 (4.9)	64.1 (17.8)
Daily mean °F (°C)	25.5 (−3.6)	28.4 (−2.0)	38.1 (3.4)	45.9 (7.7)	56.0 (13.3)	66.7 (19.3)	73.1 (22.8)	70.4 (21.3)	61.2 (16.2)	47.9 (8.8)	34.5 (1.4)	25.1 (−3.8)	47.7 (8.7)
Mean daily minimum °F (°C)	9.7 (−12.4)	12.6 (−10.8)	21.4 (−5.9)	29.8 (−1.2)	40.7 (4.8)	50.4 (10.2)	56.2 (13.4)	53.7 (12.1)	43.6 (6.4)	31.0 (−0.6)	18.2 (−7.7)	9.4 (−12.6)	31.4 (−0.4)
Mean minimum °F (°C)	−9.6 (−23.1)	−5.9 (−21.1)	4.0 (−15.6)	16.1 (−8.8)	26.8 (−2.9)	38.4 (3.6)	47.4 (8.6)	45.3 (7.4)	30.4 (−0.9)	12.5 (−10.8)	−0.8 (−18.2)	−8.0 (−22.2)	−16.8 (−27.1)
Record low °F (°C)	−30 (−34)	−33 (−36)	−20 (−29)	4 (−16)	16 (−9)	20 (−7)	33 (1)	33 (1)	17 (−8)	−18 (−28)	−17 (−27)	−38 (−39)	−38 (−39)
Average precipitation inches (mm)	0.15 (3.8)	0.23 (5.8)	0.76 (19)	1.49 (38)	2.08 (53)	2.08 (53)	1.75 (44)	1.98 (50)	1.26 (32)	0.87 (22)	0.43 (11)	0.35 (8.9)	13.43 (340.5)
Average snowfall inches (cm)	2.4 (6.1)	2.3 (5.8)	3.8 (9.7)	1.2 (3.0)	0.3 (0.76)	0.0 (0.0)	0.0 (0.0)	0.0 (0.0)	0.1 (0.25)	1.6 (4.1)	2.8 (7.1)	4.3 (11)	18.8 (47.81)
Average precipitation days (≥ 0.01 in)	2.0	2.3	3.3	4.8	8.8	7.4	7.0	7.1	4.8	4.4	3.1	2.6	57.6
Average snowy days (≥ 0.1 in)	1.4	1.6	1.6	0.8	0.1	0.0	0.0	0.0	0.1	0.8	1.4	2.3	10.1
Source 1: NOAA
Source 2: National Weather Service

== Demographics ==
The United States Census Bureau initially defined the Briggsdale CDP for the United States Census 2020.

Briggsdale CDP, Colorado
Year	Pop.	±%
2020	134	—
Source: United States Census Bureau

== See also ==
- Front Range Urban Corridor
- Greeley, CO Metropolitan Statistical Area
