= Weld County, Colorado =

County in Colorado, United States

- County
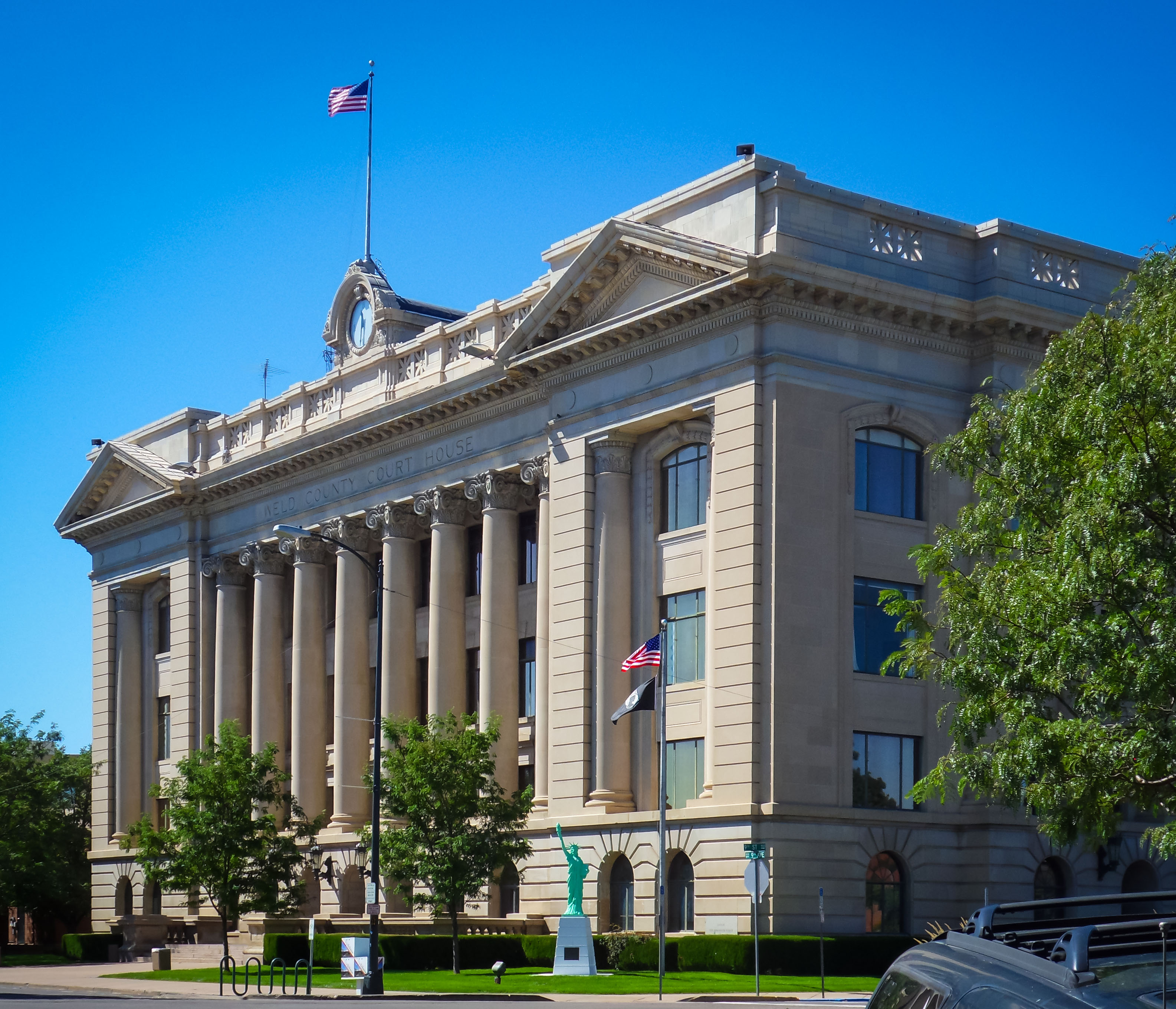
- Weld County Courthouse

- Location within the U.S. state of Colorado
- Coordinates: 40.54°N 104.40°W
- Country: United States
- State: Colorado
- Founded: November 3, 1861
- Named for: Lewis Ledyard Weld
- Seat: Greeley
- Largest city: Greeley

Area
  - Total: 4,017 sq mi (10,400 km^{2})
  - Land: 3,987 sq mi (10,330 km^{2})
  - Water: 30 sq mi (78 km^{2}) 0.7%

Population (2020)
  - Total: 328,981
  - Estimate (2025): 378,426 ▲
  - Density: 82.51/sq mi (31.86/km^{2})
- Time zone: UTC−7 (Mountain)
  - Summer (DST): UTC−6 (MDT)
- Congressional districts: 2nd, 4th, 8th
- Website: www.weld.gov

Weld County is a county located in the U.S. state of Colorado. As of the 2020 census, the population was 328,981. The county seat is Greeley. Weld County comprises the Greeley, CO Metropolitan Statistical Area, which is included in the Denver–Aurora, CO Combined Statistical Area. Weld County is one of the fastest growing counties in Colorado.

== History ==
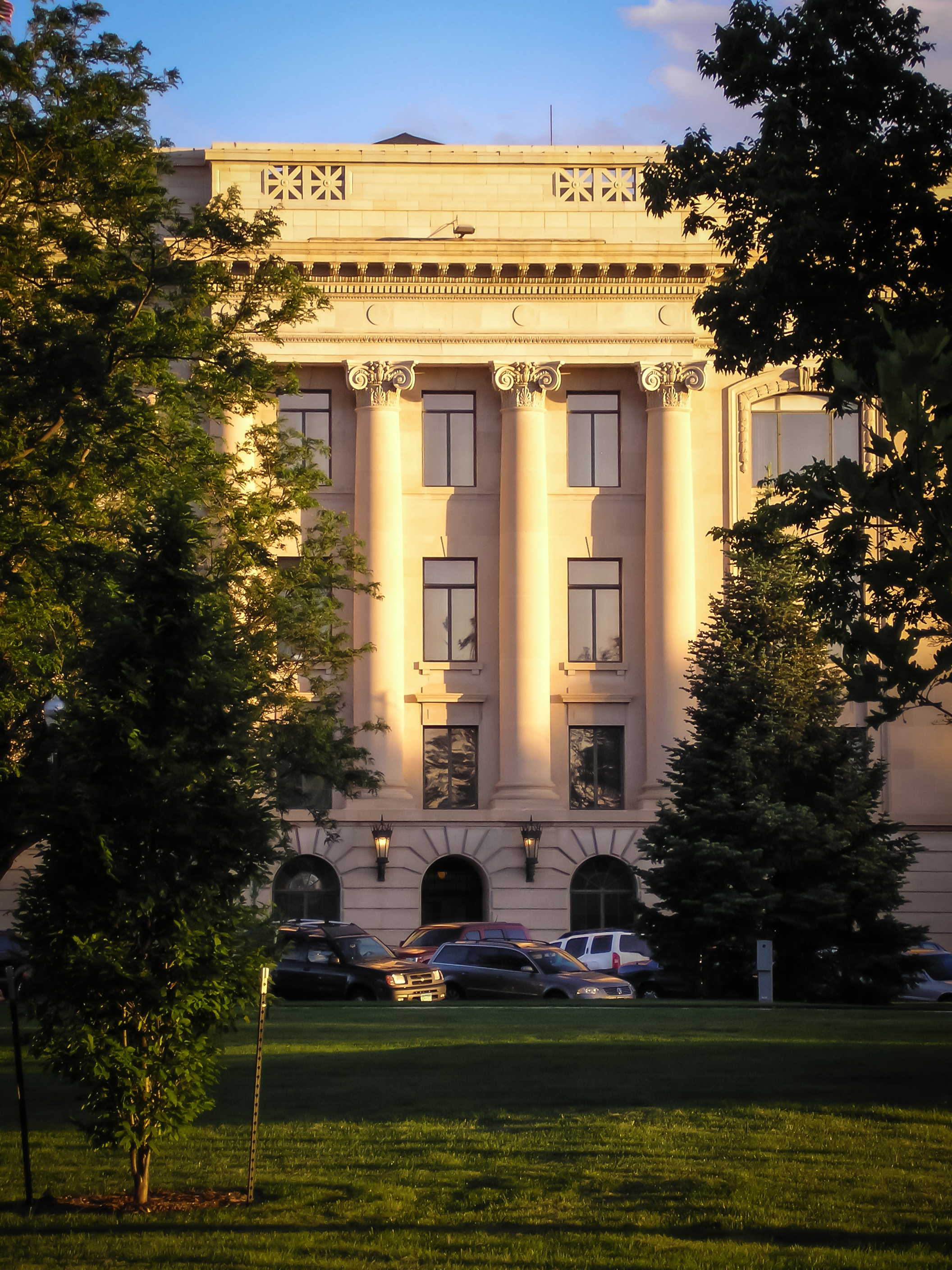
Weld County Courthouse from Lincoln Park.

On May 30, 1854, the Kansas–Nebraska Act created the Nebraska Territory and the Kansas Territory, divided by the Parallel 40° North (Baseline Road or County Line Road or Weld County Road 2 in the future Weld County). Present-day Weld County, Colorado, lay in the southwestern portion of the Nebraska Territory, bordering the Kansas Territory.

In July 1858, gold was discovered along the South Platte River in Arapahoe County, Kansas Territory. This discovery precipitated the Pike's Peak Gold Rush. Many residents of the mining region felt disconnected from the remote territorial governments of Kansas and Nebraska, so they voted to form their own Territory of Jefferson on October 24, 1859. The following month, the Jefferson Territorial Legislature organized 12 counties for the new territory, including St. Vrain County. St. Vrain County was named in honor of Ceran de Hault de Lassus de St. Vrain, the French trader who established the first trading post on the upper South Platte River. St. Vrain County encompassed much of what is today Weld County.

The Jefferson Territory never received federal sanction, but on February 28, 1861, U.S. President James Buchanan signed an act organizing the Territory of Colorado. On November 1, 1861, the Colorado General Assembly organized 17 counties, including Weld County, for the new Colorado Territory. Weld County was named for Lewis Ledyard Weld, a lawyer and territorial secretary. He died while serving in the Union Army during the Civil War. Until February 9, 1887, Weld County's boundaries included the area now comprising Weld County, Washington County, Logan County, Morgan County, Yuma County, Phillips County, and Sedgwick County.

Weld County was thrust into the media spotlight on the evening of November 1, 1955, when United Airlines Flight 629, a Douglas DC-6B airliner flying from Denver to Portland, Oregon, exploded in midair and crashed, killing all 44 persons on board the plane and scattering bodies, wreckage and debris over a six-square-mile area of the county. The subsequent investigation of the accident revealed that Denver resident John Gilbert Graham had secretly placed a time bomb composed of 25 sticks of dynamite in a suitcase belonging to his mother, who was a passenger on the airplane. Graham was tried and convicted of the crime, and executed in 1957.

In northeastern Weld County, Minuteman III missile silo "N-8", one of the many unmanned silos there, was the target of symbolic vandalism by Catholic peace activists in 2002.

Weld County also holds the distinction of having more confirmed tornado sightings than any other U.S. county from 1950 to 2011, with 252 confirmed reports.

On March 6, 2019, the county declared itself to be a Second Amendment sanctuary.

=== Secession proposals ===
In 2013, conservative Weld County commissioners began a campaign to secede from the State of Colorado to create a new state; a state ballot measure regarding the issue was put on the November 2013 ballot. The legality of this initiative has been questioned by local attorneys. On November 5, 2013, 6 out of 11 Colorado counties voted no for secession, including Elbert, Lincoln, Logan, Moffat, Sedgwick, and Weld counties voted no, while Cheyenne, Kit Carson, Phillips, Washington, and Yuma counties voted yes. "Weld County voters said this is an option we shouldn't pursue and we won't pursue it," said Weld County Commissioner Sean Conway, "But we will continue to look at the problems of the urban and rural divide in this state."

The logo of Weld County, WY.

In 2021, a group known as "Weld County, WY" organized a petition to place a measure on the November 2021 ballot for the county to secede from Colorado to join Wyoming, due to a clash between the conservative politics of Weld County and the liberal government of Colorado. Mark Gordon, the Governor of Wyoming, said when asked about the topic, "We would love that." In response to Gordon's comment, Colorado Governor Jared Polis said, "Hands off Weld County."

== Geography ==
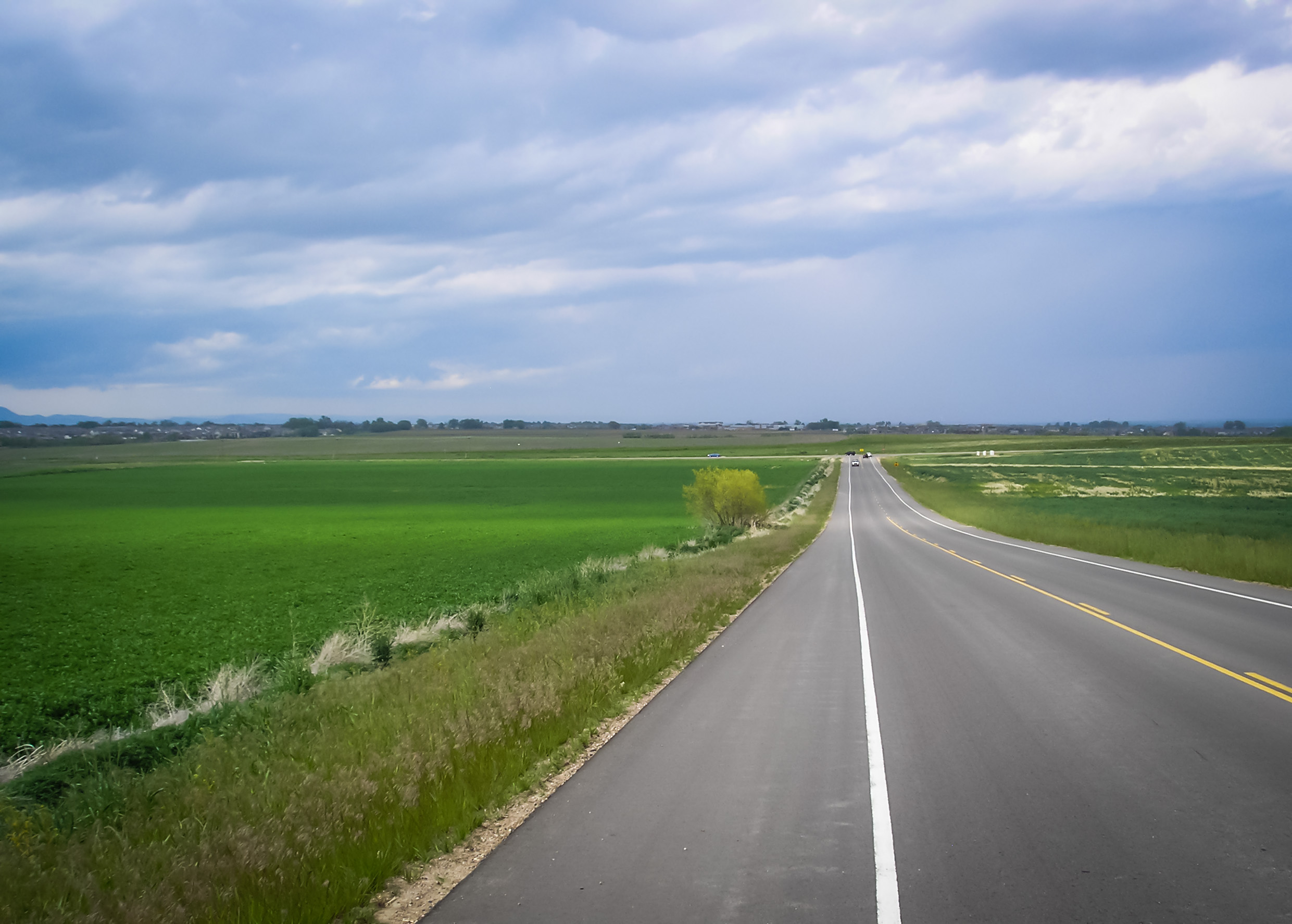
Crop fields in western Weld County

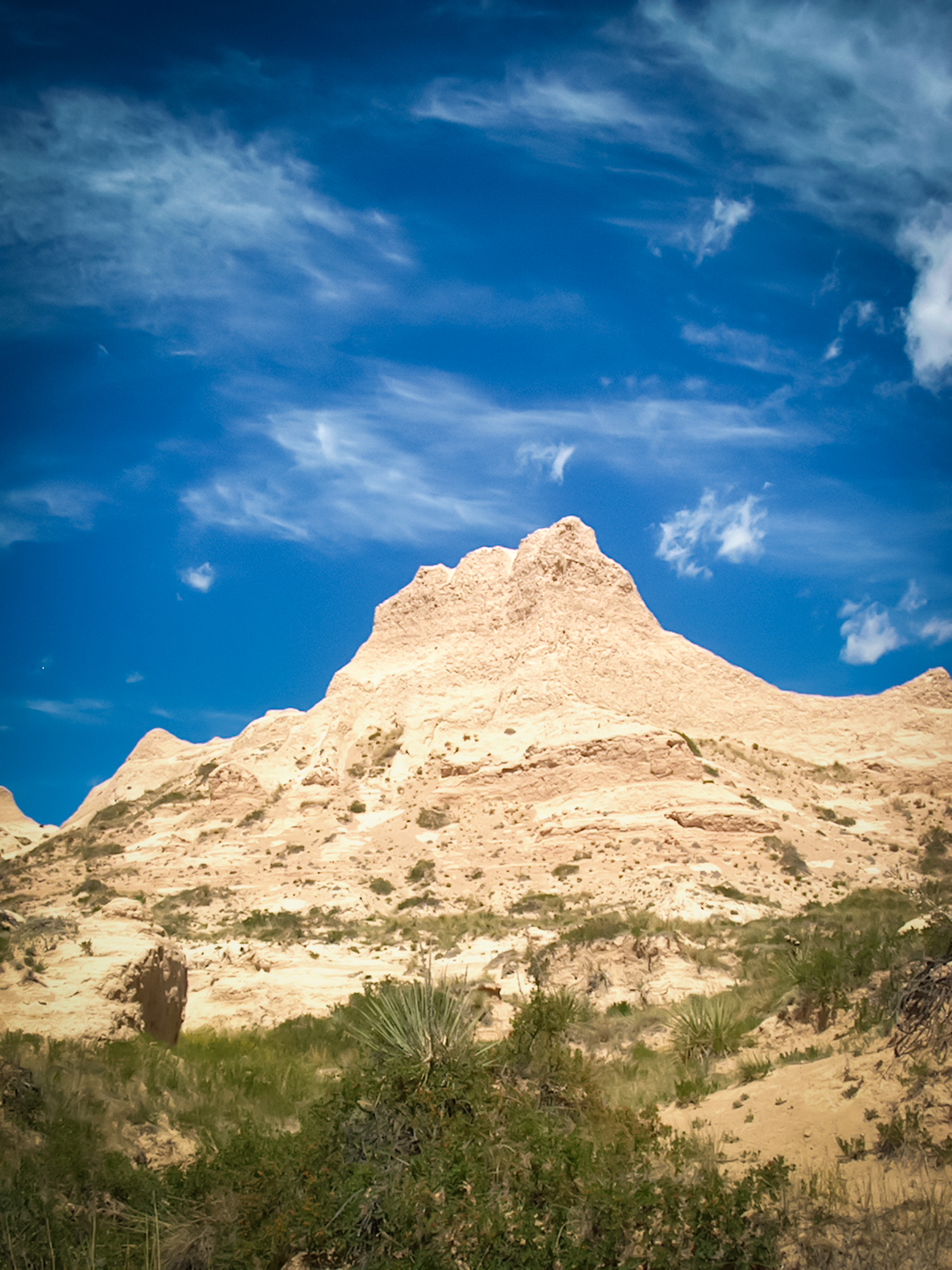
Rock formation near the Pawnee Buttes

According to the U.S. Census Bureau, the county has a total area of 4,017 square miles (10,400 km^{2}), of which 3,987 square miles (10,330 km^{2}) are land and 30 square miles (78 km^{2}) (0.7%) are water. It is the third-largest county in Colorado by area.

Weld County lies within the relatively flat eastern portion of Colorado; the northeastern portions of the county contain the extensive Pawnee National Grassland and the Pawnee Buttes, which jut 350 feet (110 m) above the surrounding terrain and are surrounded by many small canyons and outcroppings. Along the western border, hilly areas indicate the presence of the foothills of the Rocky Mountains further west.

The county is served by two interstate highways: I-25 (US 87) runs through the southwestern corner and I-76 from the south central edge northeastward to the Morgan county border. Other major roads include US 85 and US 34, which intersect near Greeley, and State Highway 14, which runs through Ault.

=== Adjacent counties ===
- Kimball County, Nebraska - northeast
- Logan County - east
- Morgan County - east
- Adams County - south
- City and County of Broomfield - southwest
- Boulder County - west
- Larimer County - west
- Laramie County, Wyoming - northwest

=== Major highways ===
- Interstate 25
- Interstate 76
- U.S. Highway 34
- U.S. Highway 85
- U.S. Highway 87
- State Highway 14
- State Highway 52
- State Highway 56
- State Highway 60
- State Highway 66
- State Highway 71
- State Highway 79
- State Highway 257
- State Highway 392
- CR 47(Weld County Parkway)
- CR 49(Weld County Parkway)
- CR 126

=== Transit ===
- Greeley-Evans Transit
- Express Arrow

=== National protected area ===
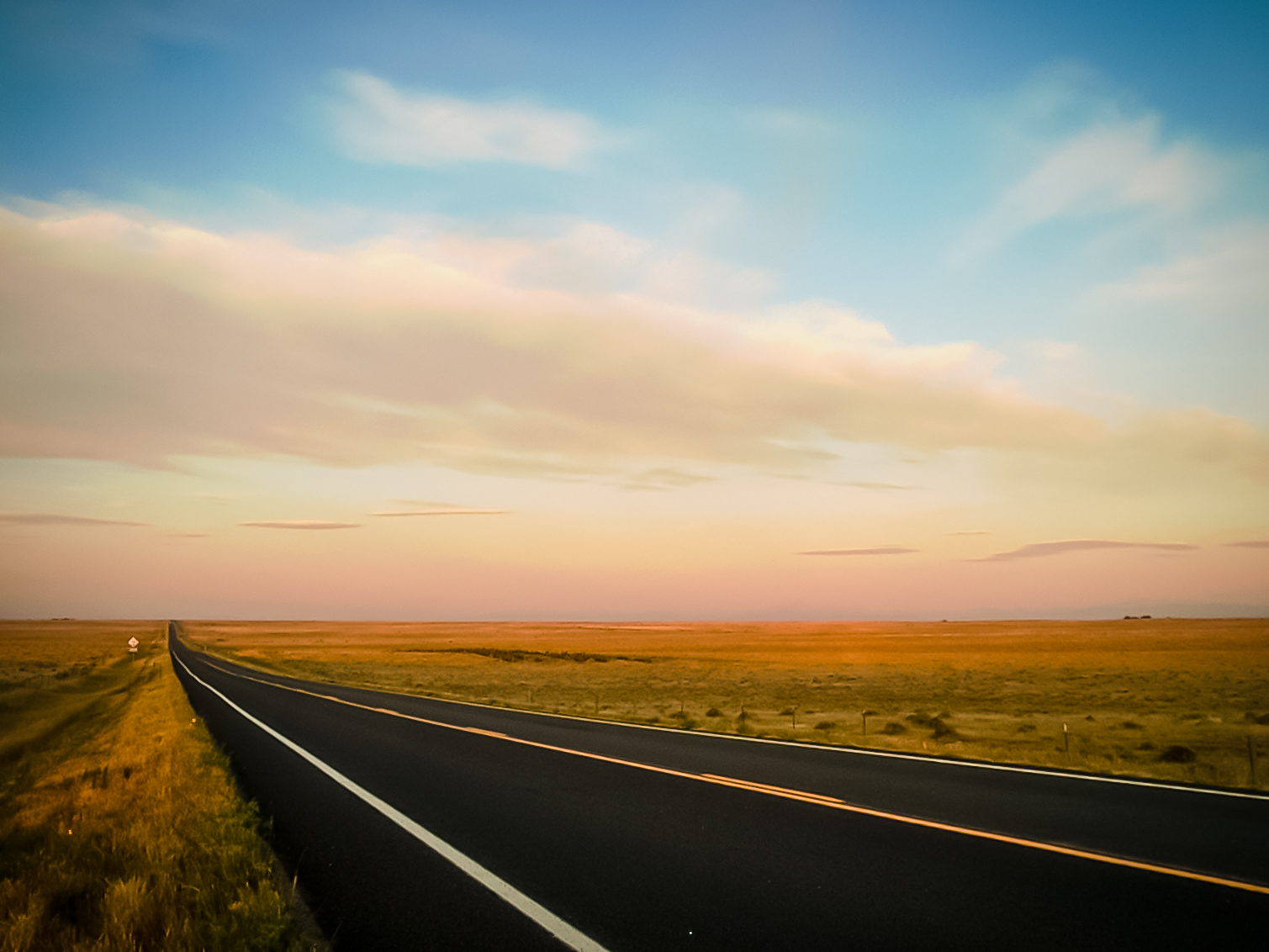
Sunrise over the Pawnee National Grassland in northeastern Weld County.

- Pawnee National Grassland

=== State protected area ===
- Fort Vasquez State History Museum
- St. Vrain State Park

=== Trails and byways ===
- American Discovery Trail
- Pawnee Pioneer Trails
- Poudre River National Recreation Trail
- South Platte Trail

== Demographics ==
Historical population
Census	Pop.	Note	%±
1870	1,636		—
1880	5,646		245.1%
1890	11,736		107.9%
1900	16,808		43.2%
1910	39,177		133.1%
1920	54,059		38.0%
1930	65,097		20.4%
1940	63,747		−2.1%
1950	67,504		5.9%
1960	72,344		7.2%
1970	89,297		23.4%
1980	123,438		38.2%
1990	131,821		6.8%
2000	180,936		37.3%
2010	252,825		39.7%
2020	328,981		30.1%
2025 (est.)	378,426	▲	15.0%
U.S. Decennial Census; 1790-1960 1900-1990; 1990-2000 2010-2020

=== 2020 census ===
As of the 2020 census, the county had a population of 328,981. Of the residents, 26.5% were under the age of 18 and 12.6% were 65 years of age or older; the median age was 34.5 years. For every 100 females there were 100.4 males, and for every 100 females age 18 and over there were 98.9 males. 80.0% of residents lived in urban areas and 20.0% lived in rural areas.

Weld County, Colorado – Racial and ethnic composition Note: the US Census treats Hispanic/Latino as an ethnic category. This table excludes Latinos from the racial categories and assigns them to a separate category. Hispanics/Latinos may be of any race.
Race / Ethnicity (NH = Non-Hispanic)	Pop 2000	Pop 2010	Pop 2020	% 2000	% 2010	% 2020
White alone (NH)	126,573	170,827	205,881	69.95%	67.57%	62.58%
Black or African American alone (NH)	817	2,054	4,154	0.45%	0.81%	1.26%
Native American or Alaska Native alone (NH)	771	1,419	1,327	0.43%	0.56%	0.40%
Asian alone (NH)	1,452	2,873	5,682	0.80%	1.14%	1.73%
Pacific Islander alone (NH)	125	158	303	0.07%	0.06%	0.09%
Other race alone (NH)	184	359	1,305	0.10%	0.14%	0.40%
Mixed race or Multiracial (NH)	2,079	3,455	11,867	1.15%	1.37%	3.61%
Hispanic or Latino (any race)	48,935	71,680	98,462	27.05%	28.35%	29.93%
Total	180,936	252,825	328,981	100.00%	100.00%	100.00%

The racial makeup of the county was 70.5% White, 1.4% Black or African American, 1.3% American Indian and Alaska Native, 1.8% Asian, 0.1% Native Hawaiian and Pacific Islander, 11.2% from some other race, and 13.8% from two or more races. Hispanic or Latino residents of any race comprised 29.9% of the population.

There were 113,995 households in the county, of which 38.2% had children under the age of 18 living with them and 20.5% had a female householder with no spouse or partner present. About 20.3% of all households were made up of individuals and 7.7% had someone living alone who was 65 years of age or older.

There were 119,962 housing units, of which 5.0% were vacant. Among occupied housing units, 72.4% were owner-occupied and 27.6% were renter-occupied. The homeowner vacancy rate was 1.4% and the rental vacancy rate was 7.6%.

=== 2000 census ===
As of the 2000 census, there were 180,936 people, 63,247 households, and 45,221 families residing in the county. The population density was 45 people per square mile (17 people/km^{2}). There were 66,194 housing units at an average density of 17 units per square mile (6.6 units/km^{2}).

The racial makeup of the county was 81.71% White, 0.56% Black or African American, 0.87% Native American, 0.83% Asian, 0.08% Pacific Islander, 13.29% from other races, and 2.65% from two or more races. 27.05% of the population were Hispanic or Latino of any race.

There were 63,247 households, out of which 37.20% had children under the age of 18 living with them, 57.60% were married couples living together, 9.40% had a female householder with no husband present, and 28.50% were non-families. 21.00% of all households were made up of individuals, and 6.90% had someone living alone who was 65 years of age or older. The average household size was 2.78 and the average family size was 3.25.

In the county, the population was spread out, with 28.20% under the age of 18, 13.20% from 18 to 24, 29.70% from 25 to 44, 20.00% from 45 to 64, and 9.00% who were 65 years of age or older. The median age was 31 years. For every 100 females there were 100.60 males. For every 100 females age 18 and over, there were 98.00 males.

The median income for a household in the county was $42,321, and the median income for a family was $49,569. Males had a median income of $35,037 versus $25,757 for females. The per capita income for the county was $18,957. About 8.00% of families and 12.50% of the population were below the poverty line, including 14.60% of those under age 18 and 8.50% of those age 65 or over.

== Economy ==
Weld County is Colorado's leading producer of cattle, grain and sugar beets, and is the richest agricultural county in the United States east of the Rocky Mountains, and the fourth richest overall nationally. It is also becoming more important as a milk producing county, with close to half of the state's cattle. Weld County is also an important area of oil and natural gas production in the Denver-Julesburg Basin.

== Communities ==
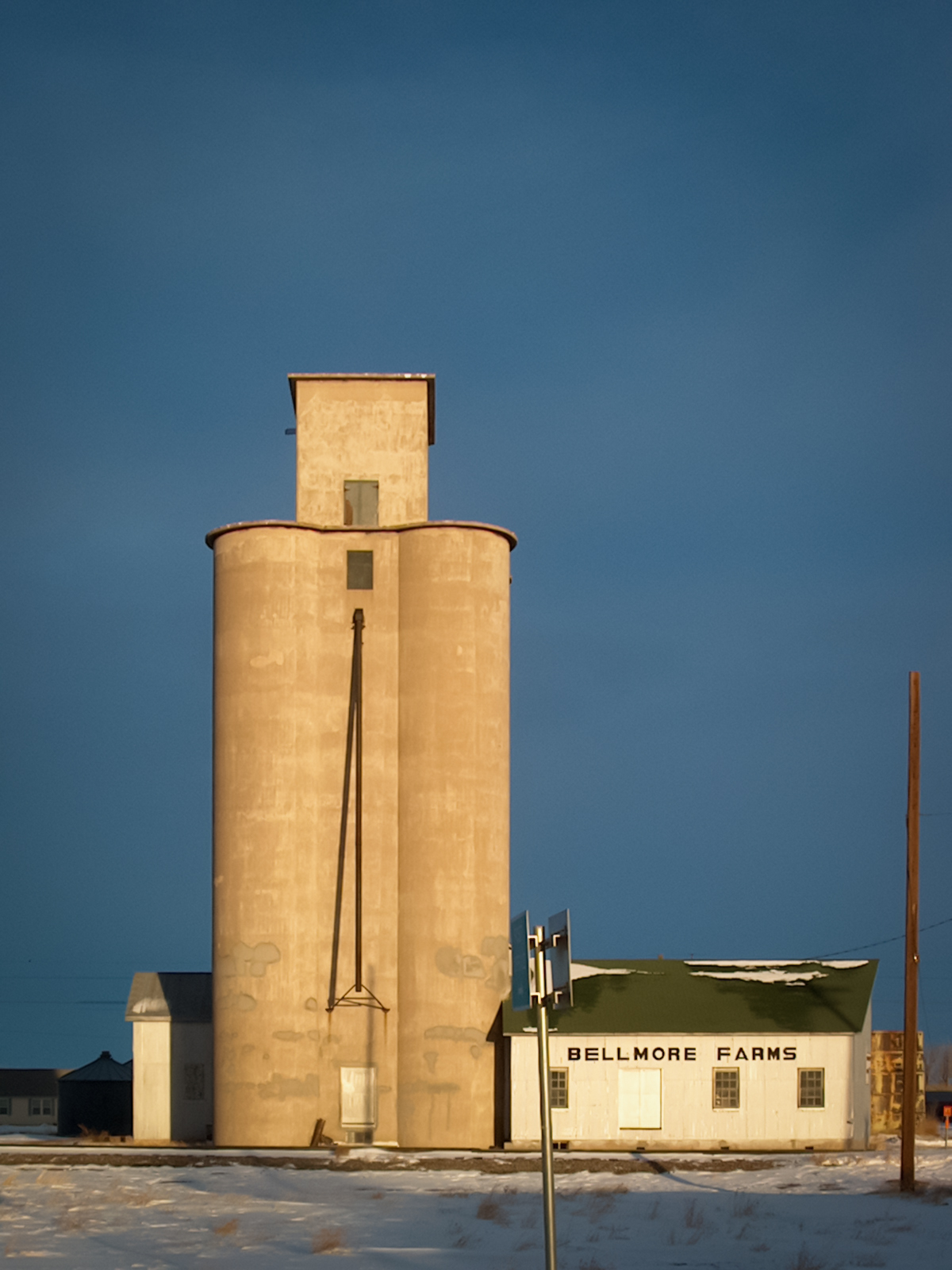
A grain elevator in Nunn

=== Cities ===
- Brighton ‡
- Dacono
- Evans
- Fort Lupton
- Greeley
- Longmont ‡
- Northglenn ‡
- Thornton ‡

=== Towns ===
- Ault
- Berthoud ‡
- Eaton
- Erie ‡
- Firestone
- Frederick
- Garden City
- Gilcrest
- Grover
- Hudson
- Johnstown ‡
- Keenesburg
- Kersey
- LaSalle
- Lochbuie ‡
- Mead
- Milliken
- Nunn
- Pierce
- Platteville
- Raymer
- Severance
- Windsor ‡

=== Census-designated places ===
- Aristocrat Ranchettes
- Briggsdale

=== Unincorporated communities ===
- Auburn
- Avalo
- Buda
- Carr
- Dearfield
- Galeton (originally called "Zita")
- Gill
- Hereford
- Highlandlake
- Ione
- Keota
- Lucerne
- Roggen
- Stoneham
- Wattenburg

=== Ghost towns ===
- Adna
- Agricola
- Chapelton
- Chenoa
- Cherokee City
- Cloverly
- Coleman
- Dearfield
- Elwell
- Flemings Ranch
- Fort St. Vrain
- Fosston
- Gault
- Geary
- Graham
- Green City
- Highland Lake
- Hillsborough
- Hiltonville
- Hungerford
- Ione
- Kalous
- Kauffman
- Koenig
- Lancaster
- Latham
- Liberty
- Masters
- Nantes
- New Liberty
- Osgood
- Peckham
- Platte Valley
- Raymer
- Rinn
- Rosedale
- Saint Vrain
- Serene
- Sligo
- Spanish Colony
- Wentz
- Zilar
- Zita

‡ means a populated place has portions in an adjacent county or counties

== Politics ==
Similar to the fellow Denver Metropolitan Area county of Douglas, Weld leans Republican. Except for Lyndon Johnson's 1964 landslide win over Barry Goldwater, it has not voted for a Democratic presidential candidate since 1936.

United States presidential election results for Weld County, Colorado
Year	Republican		Democratic		Third party(ies)	
Year	No.	%	No.	%	No.	%
1880	804	56.26%	373	26.10%	252	17.63%
1884	1,332	53.49%	765	30.72%	393	15.78%
1888	1,942	57.56%	1,036	30.71%	396	11.74%
1892	1,138	41.10%	0	0.00%	1,631	58.90%
1896	874	15.54%	4,620	82.13%	131	2.33%
1900	2,786	42.95%	3,386	52.20%	314	4.84%
1904	4,833	62.12%	2,555	32.84%	392	5.04%
1908	5,537	51.05%	4,650	42.87%	659	6.08%
1912	3,114	27.39%	4,713	41.46%	3,541	31.15%
1916	5,395	37.12%	8,600	59.18%	538	3.70%
1920	10,268	63.78%	5,202	32.31%	630	3.91%
1924	10,185	62.68%	3,406	20.96%	2,659	16.36%
1928	13,719	69.58%	5,762	29.22%	236	1.20%
1932	10,754	46.87%	11,182	48.73%	1,009	4.40%
1936	9,606	41.23%	12,993	55.77%	697	2.99%
1940	16,129	59.72%	10,653	39.44%	227	0.84%
1944	14,546	63.01%	8,459	36.64%	81	0.35%
1948	12,446	52.65%	10,934	46.25%	259	1.10%
1952	18,002	66.44%	8,890	32.81%	204	0.75%
1956	17,228	62.75%	10,170	37.04%	57	0.21%
1960	17,558	60.99%	11,179	38.83%	53	0.18%
1964	12,204	41.12%	17,268	58.18%	207	0.70%
1968	17,101	57.26%	10,420	34.89%	2,344	7.85%
1972	24,695	66.29%	11,690	31.38%	870	2.34%
1976	21,976	55.35%	16,501	41.56%	1,225	3.09%
1980	23,901	58.80%	11,433	28.13%	5,312	13.07%
1984	31,293	68.51%	13,863	30.35%	523	1.14%
1988	26,497	55.42%	20,548	42.98%	762	1.59%
1992	20,958	38.79%	19,295	35.71%	13,776	25.50%
1996	26,518	49.67%	21,325	39.94%	5,547	10.39%
2000	37,409	57.96%	23,436	36.31%	3,696	5.73%
2004	55,591	62.71%	31,868	35.95%	1,194	1.35%
2008	56,526	53.39%	47,292	44.67%	2,048	1.93%
2012	63,775	54.84%	49,050	42.18%	3,466	2.98%
2016	76,651	56.60%	46,519	34.35%	12,260	9.05%
2020	96,145	57.58%	66,060	39.56%	4,769	2.86%
2024	106,469	59.18%	68,752	38.21%	4,700	2.61%

United States Senate election results for Weld County, Colorado2
Year	Republican		Democratic		Third party(ies)	
Year	No.	%	No.	%	No.	%
2020	99,424	59.65%	63,647	38.19%	3,607	2.16%

United States Senate election results for Weld County, Colorado3
Year	Republican		Democratic		Third party(ies)	
Year	No.	%	No.	%	No.	%
2022	74,043	57.58%	50,129	38.98%	4,418	3.44%

Colorado Gubernatorial election results for Weld County
Year	Republican		Democratic		Third party(ies)	
Year	No.	%	No.	%	No.	%
2022	72,542	56.46%	52,186	40.62%	3,755	2.92%

== Education ==
School districts serving Weld County include:

- Ault-Highland School District RE-9
- Briggsdale School District RE-10
- Eaton School District RE-2
- Greeley School District 6
- Johnstown-Milliken School District RE-5J
- Pawnee School District RE-12
- Platte Valley School District RE-7
- Prairie School District RE-11
- School District 27J
- St. Vrain Valley School District RE 1J
- Thompson School District R-2J
- Weld County School District RE-1
- Weld County School District RE-3J
- Weld County School District RE-8
- Weldon Valley School District RE-20J
- Wiggins School District RE-50J
- Windsor School District RE-4

== See also ==
- Bibliography of Colorado
- Geography of Colorado
- History of Colorado
  - Fort Saint Vrain
  - St. Vrains County, Jefferson Territory
  - Fort St. Vrain Generating Station
  - Impact of the 2019–20 coronavirus pandemic on the meat industry in the United States
  - National Register of Historic Places listings in Weld County, Colorado
- Index of Colorado-related articles
- List of Colorado-related lists
  - List of counties in Colorado
  - List of statistical areas in Colorado
- Outline of Colorado
  - Front Range Urban Corridor
