= Windsor, Colorado =

Town in Colorado, United States

- Home rule town
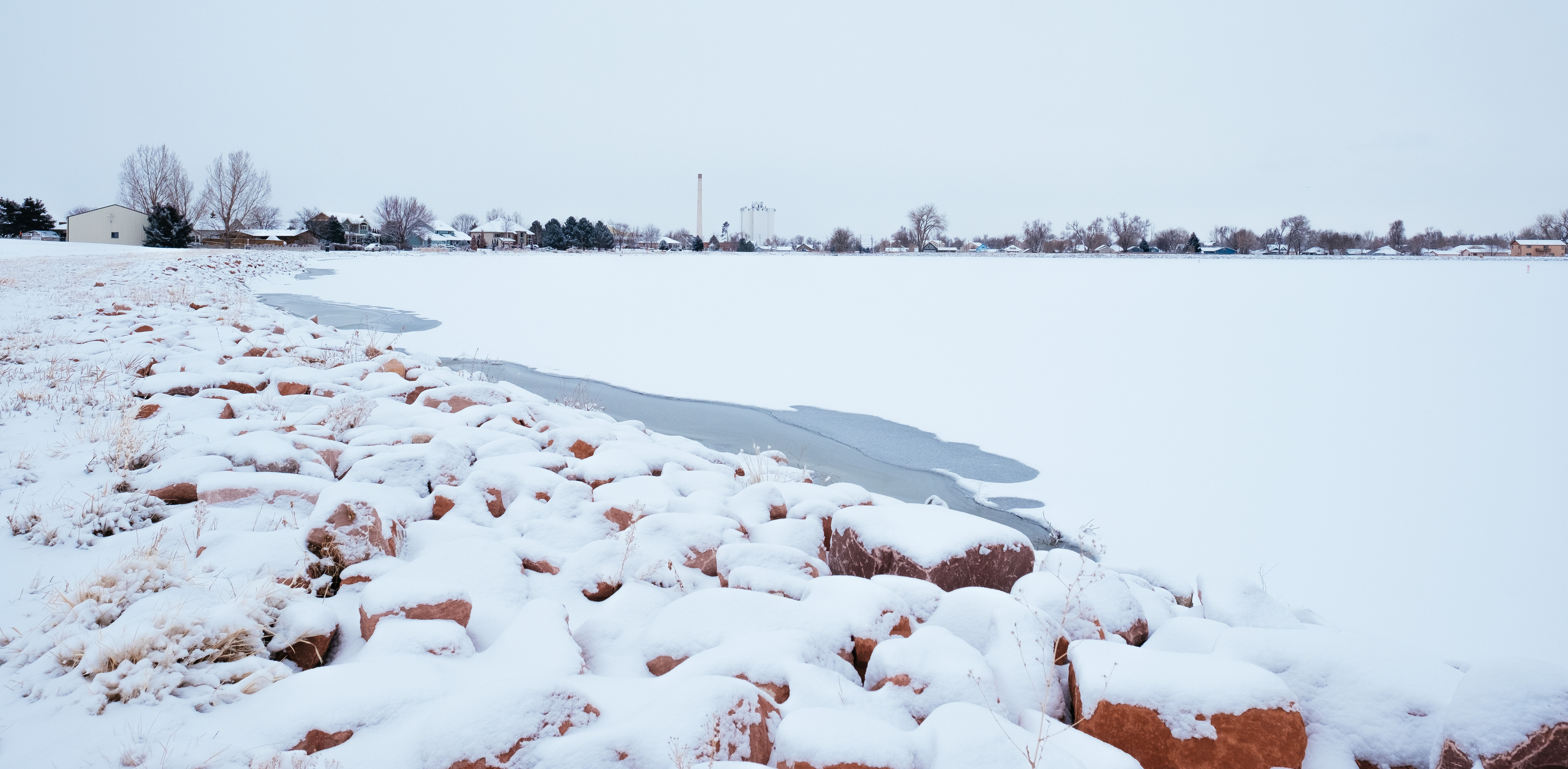
- Windsor skyline from Lake Windsor in winter

- Location of Windsor in Larimer County and Weld County, Colorado
- Coordinates: 40°28′38″N 104°54′43″W
- Country: United States
- State: Colorado
- Counties: Larimer, Weld
- Platted: 1882
- Incorporated: April 2, 1890

Government
  - Type: Home rule municipality

Area
  - Total: 26.26 sq mi (68.02 km^{2})
  - Land: 25.08 sq mi (64.96 km^{2})
  - Water: 1.18 sq mi (3.06 km^{2})
- Elevation: 4,797 ft (1,462 m)

Population (2020)
  - Total: 32,716
  - Estimate (2025): 43,840
  - Density: 1,276.5/sq mi (492.9/km^{2})
- Time zone: UTC−7 (Mountain (MST))
  - Summer (DST): UTC−6 (MDT)
- ZIP codes: 80528, 80550-80551
- Area code: 970
- FIPS code: 08-85485
- GNIS feature ID: 2413496
- Website: Town of Windsor

Windsor is a home rule municipality in Larimer and Weld counties in the U.S. state of Colorado. According to the 2020 census, the population of the town was 32,716. Windsor is located in the Northern Colorado region.

== History ==
In 1873, a settler named J.L. Hilton built a small house situated half-way between Greeley and Fort Collins. The "half-way" house, as it became known, directed travelers along a route, which was soon adopted by the Greeley, Salt Lake and Pacific railway. The railroad brought investors and farmers to Windsor in increasing numbers. Windsor's rich alluvial plains lent themselves to extensive wheat production and the establishment of one of the town's first commercial enterprises, a flour mill, which through a subsequent fire in 1899, was rebuilt and became the Windsor Milling and Elevator Company.

A rich wheat farming district, the area around Windsor first drew permanent residents in the early 1870s. Two factors were to play a critical role in stimulating Windsor's early development: irrigation and the railroad. Irrigation increased crop variety and production and the railroad shipped this bounty to market. The town was platted in 1882, the same year the Windsor Railroad Depot was built, and incorporated in 1890. It was named for the Rev. Samuel Asa Windsor. By 1900, tariffs on foreign sugar had created a market for new sources of sugar. Research in the improved cultivation of sugar beets was taking place at Colorado Agricultural College in Fort Collins, and the capital to advance production and manufacture of beet sugar was coming together. In 1903 a factory for producing sugar from sugar beets was built in Windsor. Sugar beet cultivation required large numbers of "stoop laborers", a need that was met by ethnic German immigrants from Russia. With large families and a strong work ethic, the German-Russians who settled in Windsor and other sugar beet areas would achieve financial success within one generation and own the highest producing beet farms. The Great Western Sugar Company fueled Windsor's economy through the mid-1960s, when the Windsor factory closed. Plentiful water and land drew Kodak to Windsor where it opened a manufacturing plant on the heels of the sugar factory's closing.

Kodak's opening spurred economic development in the town, and a population surge as the sugar beet factory closed. Later in the 1980s Metal Container Corporation (MCC) opened a can factory and Deline Box Company opened a factory, which closed in December 2010, that primarily served the Budweiser facility in Fort Collins, Colorado.

In the last two decades, its central location among the population centers of northern Colorado, together with its proximity to Interstate 25, have made it the site of rapid urban growth, particularly on the western edge of town, as it grows towards the interchange on I-25. In the 1990s, the town limits were westward into Larimer County. The incorporated town limits west of Interstate 25 are now contiguous with Loveland, and are separated from southeast Fort Collins by the Fossil Creek Open Space public lands of Larimer County acquired through a county-wide vote-approved sales tax. In this century, there has been significant industrial development on the southeast side of town. Vestas has a wind turbine factory, and several related companies, Hexcel and Ice Energy have headquarters in Windsor. Owens Illinois has a glass factory that primarily serves the Budweiser facility in Fort Collins, Colorado. Windsor has also attracted digital services providers in recent years, such as farm management software provider Agworld whose North American headquarters is based here.

=== 2008 tornado ===
On May 22, 2008, at approximately 11:50 a.m., a tornado devastated the town and many areas of Weld County and Larimer County, tragically taking the life of a Vietnam War veteran in his RV, and seriously injuring 78 other people in its wake. The National Weather Service tornado damage assessments conducted on Friday, May 23, and Saturday, May 24, documented large areas of damage. On the Enhanced Fujita scale, there were pockets of high-end EF3 damage west of Greeley near the Missile Silo Park Campground, and to numerous homes and businesses in eastern Windsor. Wind estimates in the heavily damaged areas were up to 165 mph. While the time of year and location of the tornado were not unusual, the west to northwest path of the tornado was highly unusual, and the tornado occurred earlier in the day than is typical for the area. The storm was accompanied by up to baseball sized hail and torrential rainfall, damaging a much larger area than the tornado itself.

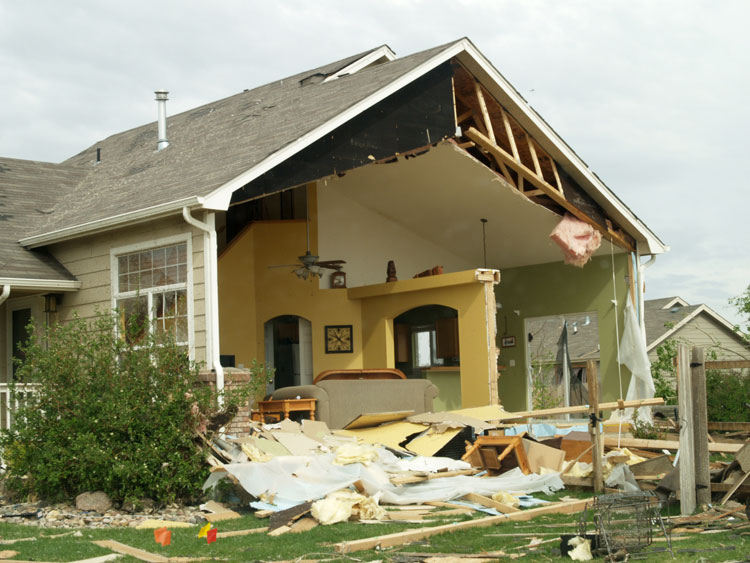
Home in Windsor, Colorado, severely damaged by tornado on May 22, 2008

In addition to the damages to homes, the tornado damaged many businesses and government buildings. The winds knocked over 15 railroad cars, vehicles, and semi trucks. The tornado hit the Windmill Daycare Center; the staff and children all survived, suffering only minor cuts and bruises. The tornado caused extensive damage to the Windsor Milling and Elevator Co. Building, a building on the National Register of Historic Places. It would take nearly 10 years for the damage to be repaired. The tornado devastated many of the town's park and recreation facilities, including the cemetery, ball fields, swimming pool, the town's main park, and a new arts and heritage center.

The Red Cross housed several hundred individuals and arranged for housing of livestock in the immediate aftermath of the tornado. Governor Bill Ritter visited the Windsor area and declared a local state of emergency. The Colorado National Guard was dispatched to assist and protect the town. On May 26, 2008, President George W. Bush designated the area as a Federal disaster area.

The tornado caused $193.5 million in damage from about 24,000 auto and homeowner claims. The U. S. Small Business Administration (SBA) approved more than $3 million in disaster loans to individuals and businesses in Weld County who suffered damage from the storm.

== Geography ==
According to the United States Census Bureau, the town has a total area of 25.6 square miles (66 km^{2}), of which 24.33 square miles (63.0 km^{2}) is land and 1.27 square miles (3.3 km^{2}) is water.

The Cache la Poudre River runs through the western and southern sides of town.

The main business district of town is east-west, along State Highway 392, which also serves as Windsor's Main Street. The BNSF line runs north of Main Street. The historic early grid of the town extends for roughly six blocks north and south of Main, and less than 10 blocks east and west, with a vibrant square green, called Main Park southeast of downtown. The park is surrounded by residences, and by the Town Hall (formerly Park School), at the north end.

Commercial development extends to the Water Valley development, along State Highway 257, near the intersection with Windsor Lake, a small reservoir in the irrigation system of Weld County, is one block north of the BNSF tracks. The lake is a popular spot for fishing. In the last decade, a 2.25 mile bike path was completed which circumscribes the lake. In addition to this reservoir, there are a number of other lakes and reservoirs that are former gravel mines along the Cache la Poudre river. These lakes have spurred housing developments and a golf course along their banks.

The Poudre Trail bicycle and pedestrian trail along the north bank of the Poudre includes a segment within the town of Windsor that connects the town with the City of Greeley.

=== Climate ===
Windsor experiences a semi-arid climate (Köppen BSk). High temperatures are generally around 85 °F (29 °C) in the summer and 42 °F (5 °C) in the winter, although there is significant variation. The hottest days generally occur in late July and the coldest in January. Nighttime lows are near 57 °F (14 °C) in the summer and around 15 °F (-9 °C) in the winter. Record high temperatures of 103 °F (39 °C) have been recorded, as have record low temperatures of -41 °F (-40 °C). The first freeze typically occurs around September 17, and the last often occurs in mid-May. The most precipitation typically occurs in May.

Extratropical cyclones which disrupt the weather for the eastern two-thirds of the US often originate in or near Colorado, which means Windsor does not experience many fully developed storm systems. Thunderstorms are frequent during summer afternoons. Windsor typically experience between 6 and 12 hail days per year and one of the highest concentrations of tornadic activity anywhere. The area where Colorado, Nebraska and Wyoming meet receives the most hail of any location in the United States.

Some days in the winter and spring can be warm and extremely dry, with Chinook winds often raising temperatures to near 70 °F (21 °C) in January and February, and sometimes to near 90 °F (32 °C) in April. Windsor's elevation and low year-round humidity means that nighttime low temperatures are practically never above 68 °F (20 °C), even in the very hottest part of the summer. The diurnal temperature range is usually rather wide, with a 50-degree (Fahrenheit) difference between daytime high and nighttime low not uncommon, especially in the spring and fall months. Rapid fluctuation in temperature is also common – a sunny 80 °F (27 °C) October afternoon can easily give way to a 28 °F (-2 °C) blizzard within 12 hours.

Climate data for Windsor, Colorado
Month	Jan	Feb	Mar	Apr	May	Jun	Jul	Aug	Sep	Oct	Nov	Dec	Year
Record high °F (°C)	74 (23)	76 (24)	82 (28)	91 (33)	96 (36)	103 (39)	106 (41)	102 (39)	99 (37)	91 (33)	80 (27)	75 (24)	106 (41)
Mean daily maximum °F (°C)	41.9 (5.5)	46.6 (8.1)	53.9 (12.2)	61.4 (16.3)	70.6 (21.4)	80.9 (27.2)	86.2 (30.1)	84.4 (29.1)	76.5 (24.7)	64.9 (18.3)	50.6 (10.3)	44.0 (6.7)	63.5 (17.5)
Mean daily minimum °F (°C)	14.5 (−9.7)	19.2 (−7.1)	25.7 (−3.5)	33.2 (0.7)	42.7 (5.9)	51.4 (10.8)	56.8 (13.8)	55.0 (12.8)	46.2 (7.9)	35.2 (1.8)	22.8 (−5.1)	16.1 (−8.8)	34.9 (1.6)
Record low °F (°C)	−25 (−32)	−20 (−29)	−4 (−20)	−3 (−19)	25 (−4)	35 (2)	42 (6)	41 (5)	17 (−8)	5 (−15)	−7 (−22)	−24 (−31)	−25 (−32)
Average precipitation inches (mm)	0.31 (7.9)	0.23 (5.8)	0.84 (21)	1.79 (45)	2.20 (56)	2.03 (52)	1.33 (34)	1.01 (26)	1.07 (27)	0.89 (23)	0.61 (15)	0.41 (10)	12.72 (322.7)
Average snowfall inches (cm)	6.8 (17)	5.9 (15)	10.8 (27)	4.9 (12)	1.1 (2.8)	0 (0)	0 (0)	0 (0)	0.9 (2.3)	3.9 (9.9)	5.8 (15)	7.6 (19)	47.7 (120)
Source: NOAA

== Demographics ==
Historical population
Census	Pop.	Note	%±
1890	173		—
1900	305		76.3%
1910	935		206.6%
1920	1,290		38.0%
1930	1,852		43.6%
1940	1,811		−2.2%
1950	1,548		−14.5%
1960	1,509		−2.5%
1970	1,564		3.6%
1980	4,277		173.5%
1990	5,062		18.4%
2000	9,896		95.5%
2010	18,644		88.4%
2020	32,716		75.5%
2025 (est.)	43,840	▲	34.0%
U.S. Decennial Census

=== Demographic history ===
Historically, many of the town's inhabitants were of Germans-from-Russia origin. Beginning in the early 1970s, as the population grew with industrialization, the ethnic makeup diversified. The town's German-Russian heritage is still evident in the town's churches, festivals and traditions.

=== 2020 census ===
As of the 2020 census, Windsor had a population of 32,716.

The median age was 38.2 years. 26.5% of residents were under the age of 18 and 15.3% of residents were 65 years of age or older. For every 100 females there were 96.9 males, and for every 100 females age 18 and over there were 94.9 males age 18 and over.

93.9% of residents lived in urban areas, while 6.1% lived in rural areas.

There were 11,807 households in Windsor, of which 38.0% had children under the age of 18 living in them. Of all households, 65.9% were married-couple households, 11.5% were households with a male householder and no spouse or partner present, and 17.5% were households with a female householder and no spouse or partner present. About 17.7% of all households were made up of individuals and 8.0% had someone living alone who was 65 years of age or older.

There were 12,846 housing units, of which 8.1% were vacant. The homeowner vacancy rate was 3.1% and the rental vacancy rate was 16.2%.

Racial composition as of the 2020 census
Race	Number	Percent
White	28,351	86.7%
Black or African American	198	0.6%
American Indian and Alaska Native	183	0.6%
Asian	489	1.5%
Native Hawaiian and Other Pacific Islander	18	0.1%
Some other race	788	2.4%
Two or more races	2,689	8.2%
Hispanic or Latino (of any race)	3,272	10.0%

== Arts and culture ==
The town hosts a Summer Concert Series at the lakeside Boardwalk Park, accompanied by food vendors and a beer garden serving locally brewed beer.

A Harvest Festival takes place on the Labor Day weekend, and includes a parade, carnival, concerts, a hot air balloon festival, and home and garden fair.

=== Museums ===
The Windsor Art and Heritage Center hosts a variety of art shows throughout the year, and provides opportunities for the community to participate in art and cultural programs for all ages.

The Boardwalk Park Museum contains seven original historical buildings, including a train depot with caboose and freight car, schoolhouse and teacher's quarters, farmhouse with summer kitchen, and a beet shanty and prayer meeting house.

The Windsor Community Playhouse, founded in 1981, produces theatrical productions.

The Windsor Severance Fire Rescue Museum houses displays of the history of Windsor Fire Department, established in 1902. The fire department was dissolved as a division of the Town of Windsor and re-organized in 1950 as the Windsor Severance Fire Protection District (now Windsor Severance Fire Rescue).

== Sports ==
The Northern Colorado Hailstorm FC is an American professional soccer team which made its debut in 2022. The team plays in USL League One, the third tier of the American soccer pyramid, and is owned by the Katofsky family and the Future Legends ownership group.

The Northern Colorado Owlz baseball team of the Pioneer League relocated to Windsor and began their first season at Future Legends Complex in 2022.

The Colorado Eagles hockey team of the American Hockey League is located in Windsor and is owned by Martin Lind.

== Parks and recreation ==
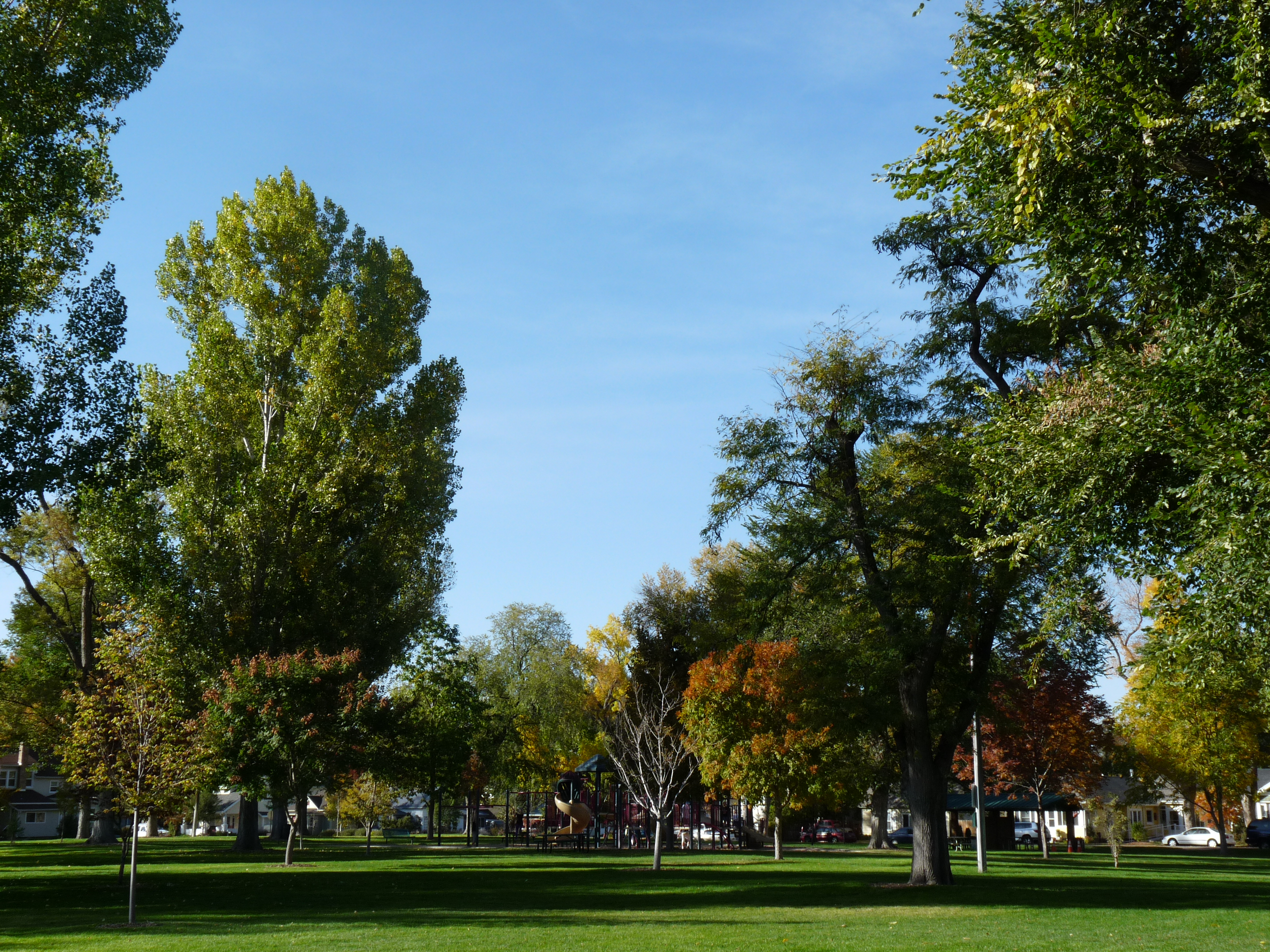
Main Park

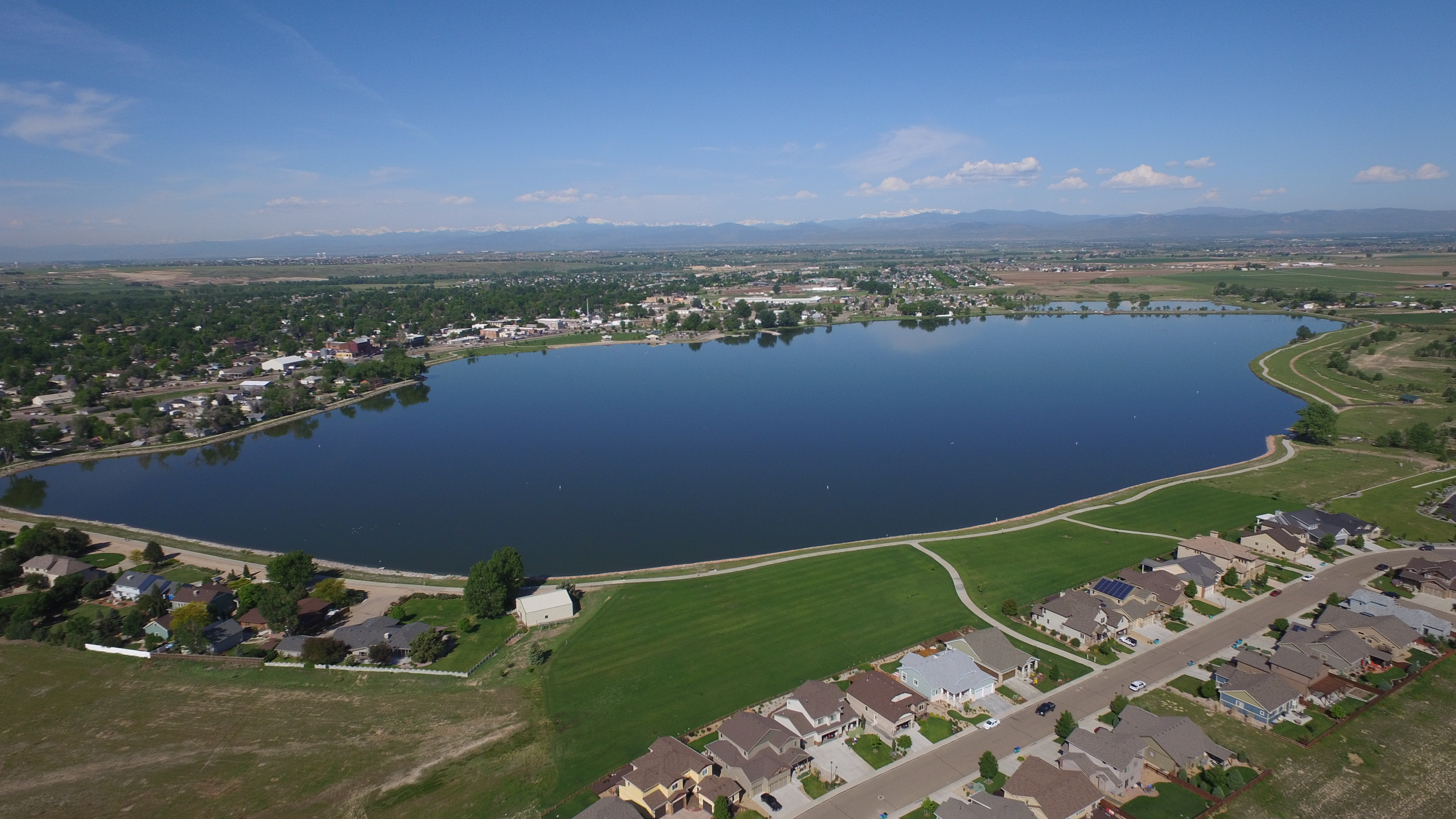
Windsor Lake

The town has 25 developed and undeveloped parks, totaling over 200 acres (81 ha).

Main Park features pickleball courts, basketball courts, sand volleyball courts, a playground and several picnic shelters.

Boardwalk Park is adjacent to Windsor Lake, and features a barrier-free wheelchair-accessible playground, picnic shelters, swim beach, boating, fishing, and a 2.25 mi (3.62 km) trail.

Chimney Park features athletic fields, baseball diamonds and an outdoor swimming pool, and includes property that was part of the Great Western Sugar factory.

Eastman Park, adjacent to the Cache la Poudre River, features a skate park, picnic shelters, athletic fields, trails, playground, and off-leash dog park. Diamond Valley features baseball and softball diamonds.

The Windsor Community Recreation Center offers classes, events, athletic leagues, senior recreation, and adaptive recreation.

== Education ==
The Weld RE-4 School District operates the following public schools in Windsor:

- American Legacy Academy Charter
- Grandview Elementary
- Hollister Lake Elementary
- Mountain View Elementary
- Orchard Hill Elementary
- Skyview Elementary
- Tozer Primary School
- Windsor Charter Elementary
- Windsor Charter Middle & High
- Windsor High School
- Windsor Middle School

== Media ==
The Windsor Ledger newspaper began publishing in 1898. It became the Poudre Valley in 1902, and the Windsor Beacon in 1946.

Windsor is home to TownSquare Media offices, as well as KUAD-FM 99.1 is a country music station.

== Notable people ==
- Ralph Backstrom, hockey player and founder of the Colorado Eagles
- Lauren Boebert, U.S. representative for Colorado
- Ken Buck, U.S. representative for Colorado
- Tom Casten, author, businessman, and activist
- Benjamin Harrison Eaton, governor of Colorado
- Jean Bethke Elshtain, political philosopher, born in Windsor
- Kendrick Frazier, science writer and editor, born in Windsor
- Jaelin Howell, soccer player who represented the United States national team
- Harvey C. Krautschun, U.S. representative for South Dakota
- Dan Meis, sports architect, born in Windsor
- Greg Myers, football player
- Sophia Smith, soccer player who represented the United States national team
