= Milliken, Colorado =

Statutory town in Weld County, Colorado, United States

Town of Milliken, Colorado
- Statutory Town
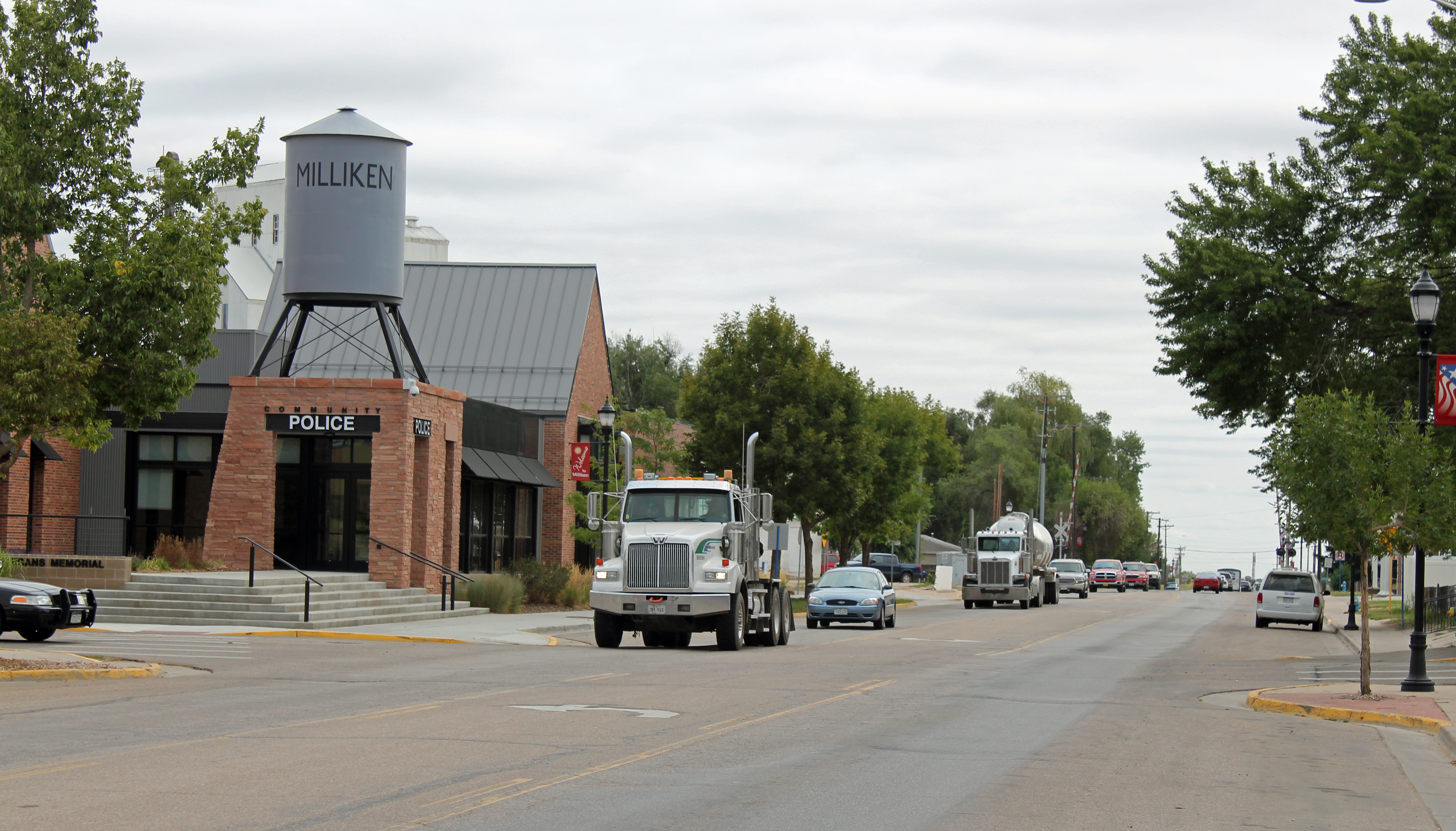
- Broad Street in Milliken.
- Nickname: The hub of northern Colorado
- Location of Milliken in Weld County, Colorado.
- Coordinates: 40°17′02″N 104°51′36″W
- Country: United States
- State: Colorado
- County: Weld
- Incorporated (town): October 1, 1910

Government
  - Type: Statutory Town

Area
  - Total: 12.90 sq mi (33.41 km^{2})
  - Land: 12.81 sq mi (33.19 km^{2})
  - Water: 0.085 sq mi (0.22 km^{2})
- Elevation: 4,810 ft (1,470 m)

Population (2020)
  - Total: 8,386
  - Density: 654.4/sq mi (252.7/km^{2})
- Time zone: UTC-7 (Mountain (MST))
  - Summer (DST): UTC-6 (MDT)
- ZIP code: 80543
- Area code: 970
- FIPS code: 08-50480
- GNIS feature ID: 2413000
- Website: Town of Milliken

Milliken is a statutory town in Weld County, Colorado, United States. The town population was 8,386 at the 2020 United States census. Milliken is a part of the Greeley, CO Metropolitan Statistical Area and the Front Range Urban Corridor.

== History ==
The town was named for John D. Milliken, a judge.

The first community located near the Milliken townsite was initially known as Hillsboro. The community began as a trading post on the Denver, Laramie, and Northwestern Railroad for agricultural goods in the 1860s. The Milliken, Colorado, post office opened on November 10, 1909, and the Town of Milliken was incorporated on October 1, 1910. In 1910, Milliken annexed nearby Hillsboro.

Fires in the 1910s destroyed much of the town, and in 1917 the Denver, Laramie, and Northwestern Railroad was abandoned.

Milliken was primarily a farming community through World War I, the Depression, and World War II. In the 1950s, two large potato decks were constructed. The late 1960s and early 1970s saw a housing boom.

In 1985 and 1986, the town’s roads were paved. The community continued to grow, causing the town government to move its facilities, to the Milliken Community Complex in 1996. Additional facilities were added, including the Milliken Public Work Facility in 2004, and a new police station in 2009.

When Millikens police department moved to a new building in 2009, the old building became vacant. It was home to a coffee shop before being used as a computer lab for many years. In 2021, the nearby Glenn A. Jones MD memorial library opened a branch there. After sharing the building with the Mill Haus Coffee for five years, the library moved to a part of the Milliken Intermediate School and is now known as the Milliken Public Library.

== Geography ==
According to the United States Census Bureau, the town has a total area of 12.90 square miles (33.4 km^{2}), of which 12.81 square miles (33.2 km^{2}) is land and 0.09 square miles (0.23 km^{2}) is water.

== Demographics ==
Historical population
Census	Pop.	Note	%±
1920	372		—
1930	483		29.8%
1940	531		9.9%
1950	510		−4.0%
1960	630		23.5%
1970	702		11.4%
1980	1,506		114.5%
1990	1,605		6.6%
2000	2,888		79.9%
2010	5,610		94.3%
2020	8,386		49.5%
2023 (est.)	9,084	▲	8.3%

=== 2020 census ===
As of the 2020 census, Milliken had a population of 8,386. The median age was 31.9 years. 29.5% of residents were under the age of 18 and 8.8% of residents were 65 years of age or older. For every 100 females there were 104.5 males, and for every 100 females age 18 and over there were 100.8 males age 18 and over.

88.7% of residents lived in urban areas, while 11.3% lived in rural areas.

There were 2,756 households in Milliken, of which 46.2% had children under the age of 18 living in them. Of all households, 63.6% were married-couple households, 14.2% were households with a male householder and no spouse or partner present, and 14.3% were households with a female householder and no spouse or partner present. About 14.7% of all households were made up of individuals and 4.8% had someone living alone who was 65 years of age or older.

There were 2,836 housing units, of which 2.8% were vacant. The homeowner vacancy rate was 1.2% and the rental vacancy rate was 3.3%.

Racial composition as of the 2020 census
Race	Number	Percent
White	6,190	73.8%
Black or African American	32	0.4%
American Indian and Alaska Native	90	1.1%
Asian	40	0.5%
Native Hawaiian and Other Pacific Islander	3	0.0%
Some other race	899	10.7%
Two or more races	1,132	13.5%
Hispanic or Latino (of any race)	2,308	27.5%

== Education ==
Milliken is served by the Weld Re-5J School District. Children in the town attend Milliken Elementary School, Knowledge Quest Academy (KQA) and Civica. Roosevelt Middle School (known as Milliken Middle school from 1969 to 2024) and Roosevelt High School are both located in nearby Johnstown. In the 2025–26 school year, 3rd through 5th graders will attend the former Milliken Middle School, which has been renamed and repurposed into Milliken Intermediate School.

== Daniels School ==
The Daniels School was built in Milliken in 1911. It is a two-room schoolhouse, with a partition that allowed separation of grades 1–4 and grades 5–8, which operated from 1911 to 1959. It was listed on the National Register of Historic Places in 2005. It was built on a one-acre (0.40 ha) plot of land donated to the school district by James Daniels in 1879. A wood-frame schoolhouse was built first; it was sold and moved off the property to enable replacement by the present brick building in 1911. James Daniels served as director of the school for many years. The school was named, however, for his brother, Henry Daniels, who was a pioneer in the Big Thompson Valley area before Johnstown and Milliken existed.

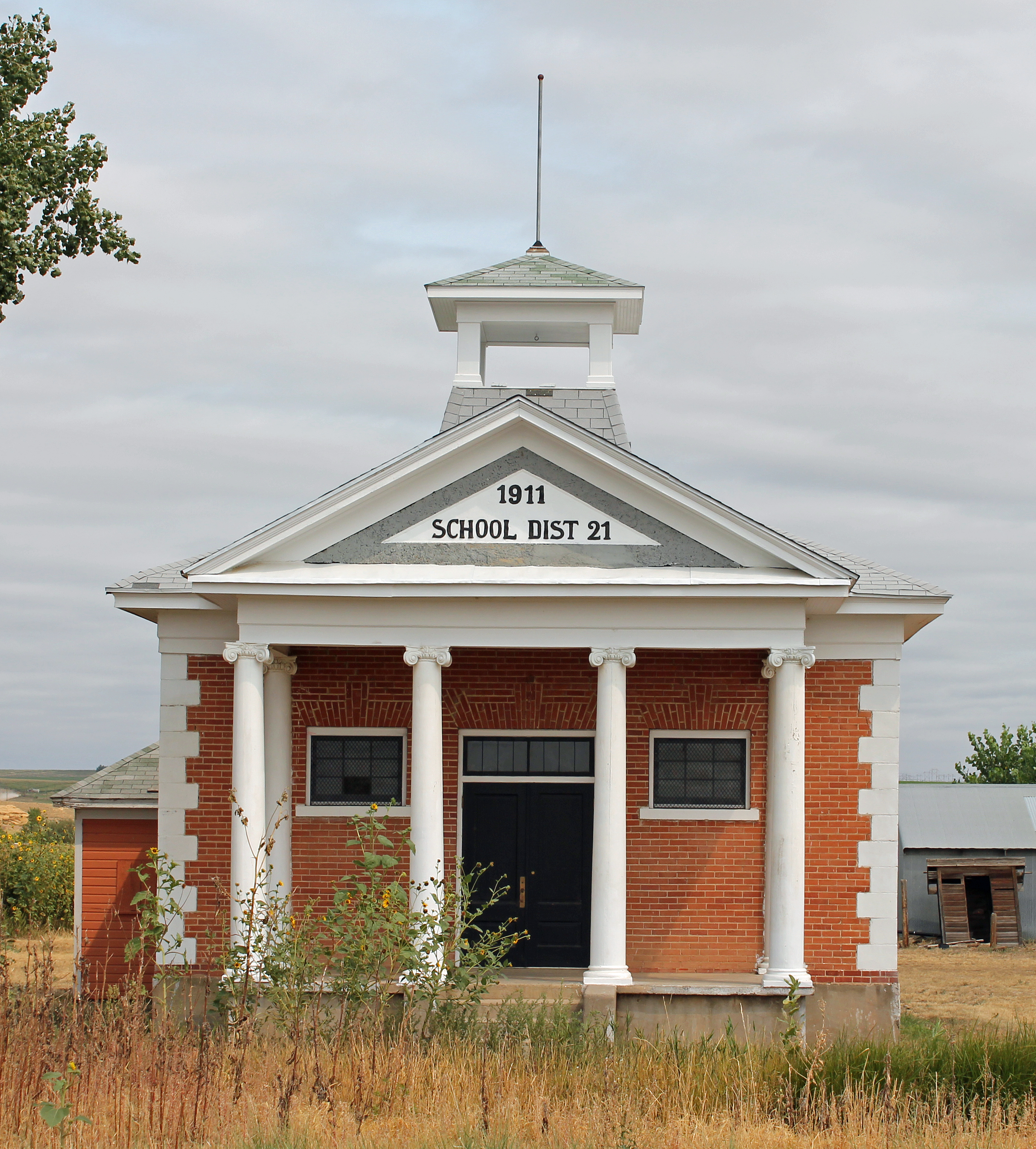
The school in 2012

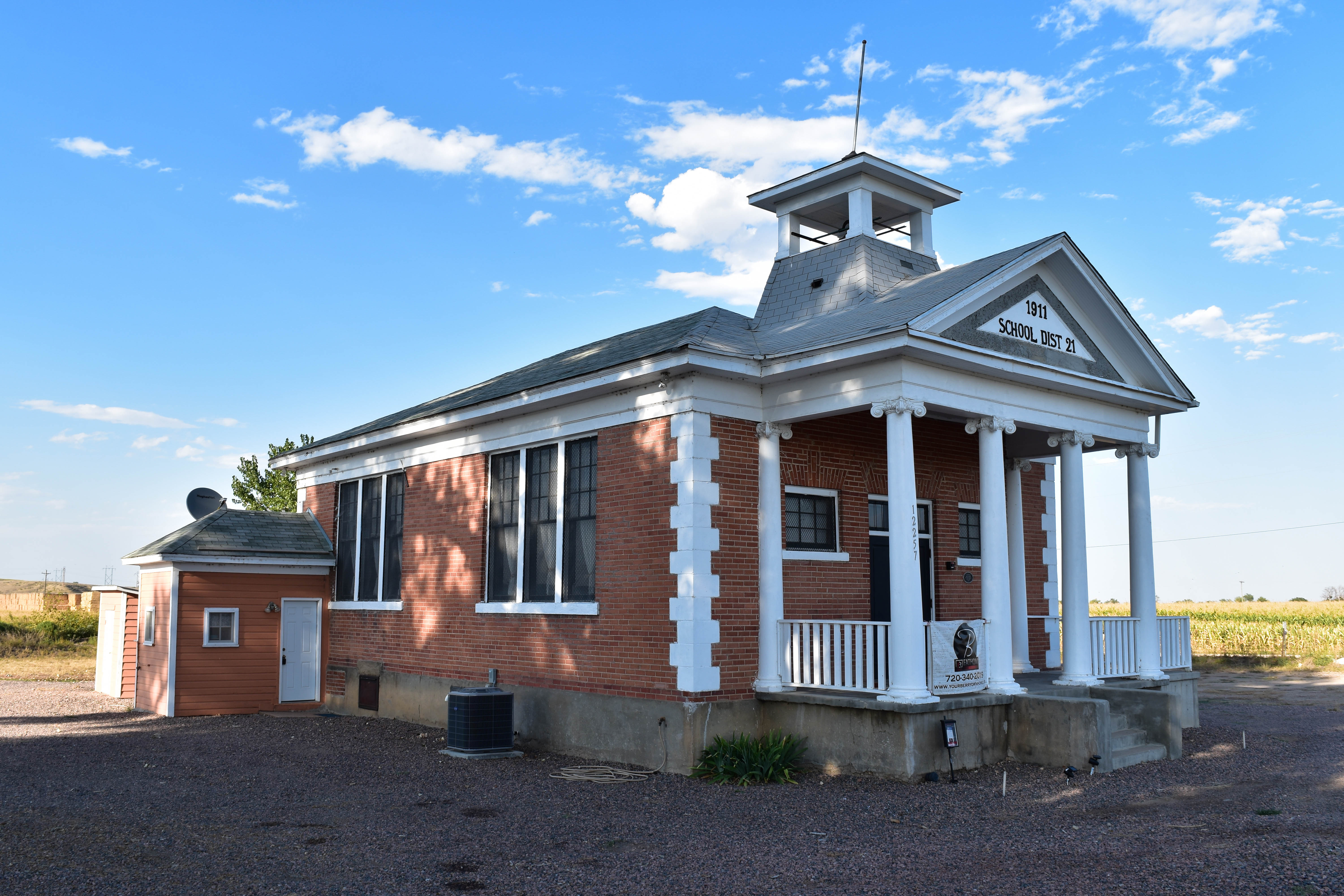
the school in 2018

== See also ==
- Greeley, CO Metropolitan Statistical Area
- Dent site, near Milliken, the first site to provide evidence that men hunted mammoth
