= Area codes 970 and 748 =

NANP telephone area codes for the U.S. state of Colorado

Coordinates: 39°N 106°W

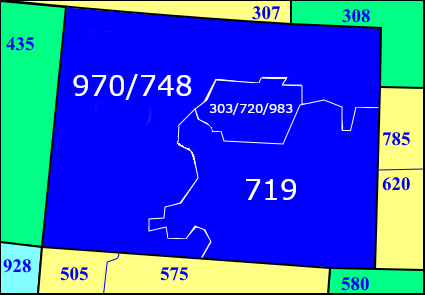
Numbering plan areas of Colorado (blue) and area codes.

Area codes 970 and 748 are telephone area codes in the North American Numbering Plan (NANP) for the western and northern parts of the U.S. state of Colorado. The numbering plan area includes Aspen, Breckenridge, Durango, Estes Park, Fort Collins, Glenwood Springs, Grand Junction, Greeley, Loveland, Montrose, Silverthorne, Steamboat Springs, and Vail.

== History ==
Area code 970 was established on April 2, 1995, in an area code split of area code 303, which was retained by the Denver metropolitan area.

On October 17, 2020, a federal law was enacted in the United States that established the short dialing code 988 for the National Suicide Prevention Lifeline. In compliance, the Federal Communications Commission ordered telecommunication carriers of 83 area codes, including 970, to transition to ten-digit dialing, even when the area code was not involved in an overlay complex, Area code 970 has PCS telephone numbers assigned for the central office code 988 in the Fort Collins exchange. Per the timeline set by the North American Numbering Plan Administrator, permissive dialing began on April 24, 2021, and ten-digit dialing has been required from October 24, 2021.

In 2023, the North American Numbering Plan Administrator estimated that area code 970 would reach numbering exhaustion by 2026. On December 18, 2023, the Colorado Public Utilities Commission approved the addition of area code 748 for the all-services distributed overlay of NPA 970. The overlay complex was activated on July 7, 2025. No central office codes for area code 748 may be installed prior to the complete exhaustion of area code 970.

== See also ==
- List of Colorado area codes
- List of North American Numbering Plan area codes

Colorado area codes: 303/720/983, 719, 748/970
	North: 307, 308	
West: 435	748/970	East: 303/720/983, 719, 785
	South: 303/720/983, 505, 575, 719	
Kansas area codes: 316, 620, 785, 913
Nebraska area codes: 308, 402/531
New Mexico area codes: 505, 575
Utah area codes: 385/801, 435
Wyoming area codes: 307
