= National Register of Historic Places listings in Weld County, Colorado =

Location of Weld County in Colorado

This is a list of the National Register of Historic Places listings in Weld County, Colorado.

This is intended to be a complete list of the properties and districts on the National Register of Historic Places in Weld County, Colorado, United States. The locations of National Register properties and districts for which the latitude and longitude coordinates are included below, may be seen in a map.

There are 41 properties and districts listed on the National Register in the county, and one formerly listed property.

This National Park Service list is complete through NPS recent listings posted August 28, 2026.

== Current listings ==
	Name on the Register	Image	Date listed	Location	City or town	Description
1	Amanda K. Alger Memorial Methodist Episcopal Church	Amanda K. Alger Memorial Methodist Episcopal Church	October 25, 2006 (#06000949)	303 Maple Ave. 40°31′45″N 104°42′49″W	Eaton	
2	Anderson Barn	Anderson Barn	October 6, 2004 (#04001112)	5255 State Highway 60; 40°20′11″N 104°57′20″W	Johnstown	Barn built in 1913 of individually formed ornamental blocks.
3	Artesia Farm		March 22, 2018 (#100002223)	11820 Cty. Rd. 64 1/2; 40°27′29″N 104°49′56″W	Greeley vicinity	
4	Clubhouse-Student Union	Clubhouse-Student Union	October 29, 2008 (#08001021)	Between 18th and 19th Sts., and 8th and 10th Aves. 40°20′11″N 104°57′18″W	Greeley	Now called Gray Hall. It houses police and parking departments of the University of Northern Colorado.
5	Elmer and Etta Ball Ranch	Elmer and Etta Ball Ranch	October 16, 1991 (#91001533)	County Road 69 west of Briggsdale; 40°37′26″N 104°24′45″W	Briggsdale	
6	Jared L. Brush Barn	Jared L. Brush Barn	October 16, 1991 (#91001532)	24308 County Road 17; 40°21′09″N 104°54′13″W	Johnstown	Hay barn built by reformed gold miner and homesteader Jared Lamar Brush in 1865.
7	Daniels School	Daniels School	July 6, 2005 (#05000653)	State Highway 60 and County Road 25; 40°19′50″N 104°49′30″W	Milliken	One-room schoolhouse built in 1911 in Classical Revival style.
8	Dearfield	Dearfield	August 4, 1995 (#95001002)	Along US 34, 11 miles west of Wiggins; 40°17′18″N 104°15′25″W	Wiggins	
9	Aaron James Eaton House	Aaron James Eaton House	April 19, 2006 (#06000281)	207 Elm St. 40°31′40″N 104°42′44″W	Eaton	
10	First Baptist Church	First Baptist Church	November 25, 1987 (#87001510)	Northwestern corner of the intersection of 10th Ave. and 11th St. 40°25′18″N 104°41′39″W	Greeley	
11	First Methodist Episcopal Church	First Methodist Episcopal Church	July 7, 2004 (#04000660)	503 Walnut St. 40°28′42″N 104°54′14″W	Windsor	
12	Fort Vasquez	Fort Vasquez	September 30, 1970 (#70000169)	13412 U.S. Highway 85; 40°11′40″N 104°49′13″W	Platteville	
13	Glazier House	Glazier House	February 5, 1991 (#91000002)	1403 10th Ave. 40°25′00″N 104°41′39″W	Greeley	
14	Greeley Downtown	Greeley Downtown	July 24, 2008 (#08000707)	Roughly bounded by 8th St., 8th Ave., 10th St., and 9th Ave. 40°25′26″N 104°41′30″W	Greeley	
15	Greeley High School	Greeley High School	April 15, 1999 (#99000444)	1515 14th Ave. 40°24′53″N 104°42′07″W	Greeley	
16	Greeley High School and Grade School	Greeley High School and Grade School	July 23, 1981 (#81000189)	1015 8th St. 40°25′31″N 104°41′43″W	Greeley	
17	Greeley Junior High School	Greeley Junior High School	October 11, 2003 (#03001012)	811 15th St. 40°24′58″N 104°41′27″W	Greeley	
18	Greeley Masonic Temple	Greeley Masonic Temple	July 7, 2004 (#04000663)	829 10th Ave. 40°25′27″N 104°41′39″W	Greeley	
19	Greeley Tribune Building	Greeley Tribune Building	April 18, 2007 (#07000310)	714 8th St. 40°25′29″N 104°41′22″W	Greeley	
20	Greeley Union Pacific Railroad Depot	Greeley Union Pacific Railroad Depot	November 4, 1993 (#93001180)	Junction of 7th Ave. and 9th St. 40°25′27″N 104°41′17″W	Greeley	
21	Jurgens Site		July 18, 1990 (#90001084)	1 mile (1.6 km) north of Kersey on State Highway 37; 40°24′27″N 104°33′56″W	Kersey	
22	Keota Stone Circles Archeological District		July 28, 1981 (#81000190)	Address Restricted	Keota	
23	Land Utilization Program Headquarters	Land Utilization Program Headquarters	October 29, 2009 (#09000854)	44741 County Road 77; 40°39′01″N 104°20′05″W	Briggsdale	
24	Lincoln School	Lincoln School	July 22, 1981 (#81000188)	645 Holbrook St. 40°03′03″N 105°03′00″W	Erie	School in service from 1906 to 1966, now the Erie Town Hall.
25	Little Thompson River Bridge	Little Thompson River Bridge	October 15, 2002 (#02001129)	Interstate 25 service road at milepost 249.90; 40°18′04″N 104°58′47″W	Berthoud	Camelback pony truss bridge built in 1938.
26	Meeker Memorial Museum	Meeker Memorial Museum	February 26, 1970 (#70000168)	1324 9th Ave. 40°25′02″N 104°41′29″W	Greeley	
27	Milne Farm	Milne Farm	February 3, 1993 (#92001840)	18457 State Highway 392; 40°28′53″N 104°42′23″W	Lucerne	
28	Nettleton-Mead House	Nettleton-Mead House	April 2, 2002 (#02000290)	1303 9th Ave. 40°25′06″N 104°41′32″W	Greeley	
29	Ottesen Grain Company Feed Mill	Ottesen Grain Company Feed Mill	November 5, 1998 (#98001320)	815 7th St. 40°05′10″N 104°48′30″W	Fort Lupton	
30	Harvey J. Parish House	Harvey J. Parish House	April 14, 2000 (#00000368)	701 Charlotte St. 40°20′10″N 104°54′49″W	Johnstown	
31	Sandstone Ranch	Sandstone Ranch	January 23, 1984 (#84000904)	East of Longmont off State Highway 119; 40°09′05″N 105°02′12″W	Longmont	
32	SLW Ranch	SLW Ranch	March 15, 1991 (#91000288)	27401 County Road 58½; 40°24′53″N 104°29′34″W	Kersey vicinity	
33	Star Filling Station	Star Filling Station	November 15, 2019 (#100004614)	301 Centre Ave. 40°36′28″N 103°50′43″W	New Raymer	
34	United Church of Christ of Highlandlake	United Church of Christ of Highlandlake	February 10, 1989 (#88002237)	16896 County Road 5; 40°14′55″N 105°00′50″W	Mead	
35	Von Gohren-Thompson Homestead-Gerry Farm Rural Historic Landscape		May 4, 2011 (#11000240)	Address Restricted	Greeley	Historic Farms and Ranches of Weld County MPS
36	Von Trotha-Firestien Farm at Bracewell	Von Trotha-Firestien Farm at Bracewell	May 12, 2009 (#09000291)	Junction of O St. and 83rd Ave., in Bracewell; 40°27′32″N 104°49′00″W	Bracewell vicinity	
37	Weld County Courthouse	Weld County Courthouse	January 9, 1978 (#78000886)	9th St. and 9th Ave. 40°25′25″N 104°41′35″W	Greeley	Classical Revival courthouse designed by William N. Bowman and completed in 1917. One of Colorado's most substantial county courthouses.
38	West Stoneham Archeological District		September 23, 1994 (#94001115)	Address Restricted	Stoneham	
39	White-Plumb Farm	White-Plumb Farm	July 27, 2005 (#05000729)	955 39th Ave. 40°25′21″N 104°44′42″W	Greeley	Now called the Plumb Farm Learning Center and owned by the City of Greeley.
40	Windsor Town Hall	Windsor Town Hall	January 15, 1999 (#98001599)	116 5th St. 40°28′50″N 104°54′13″W	Windsor	
41	Joseph A. Woodbury House	Joseph A. Woodbury House	May 17, 1984 (#84000908)	1124 7th St. 40°25′32″N 104°41′48″W	Greeley	

== Former listings ==
	Name on the Register	Image	Date listed	Date removed	Location	City or town	Description
1	Windsor Milling and Elevator Co. Building	Windsor Milling and Elevator Co. Building	September 3, 1998 (#98001129)	March 12, 2018	301 Main St. 40°28′47″N 104°54′01″W	Windsor	Destroyed by fire in August, 2017

== See also ==
- List of National Historic Landmarks in Colorado
- List of National Register of Historic Places in Colorado
- Bibliography of Colorado
- Geography of Colorado
- History of Colorado
- Index of Colorado-related articles
- List of Colorado-related lists
- Outline of Colorado
