= Mead House =

Mead House may refer to:

- Nettleton–Mead House, Greeley, Colorado, listed on the National Register of Historic Places (NRHP) in Weld County, Colorado
- Mead–Rogers House, Abilene, Kansas, listed on the NRHP in Dickinson County, Kansas
- Alpheus Mead House, Cambridge, Massachusetts, listed on the NRHP in Middlesex County
- Hager–Mead House, Waltham, Massachusetts, listed on the NRHP in Middlesex County
- Jenkins–Mead House, Morristown, New Jersey, listed on the NRHP in Morris County, New Jersey
- Mead House (Galway, New York), listed on the NRHP in Saratoga County
- Osborn–Bouton–Mead House, South Salem, New York, listed on the NRHP in Westchester County
- Mead–Zimmerman House, Greenwich, Ohio, listed on the NRHP in Huron County, Ohio
- Mead House (Pataskala, Ohio), listed on the NRHP in Licking County, Ohio

== See also ==
- Meade House (disambiguation)
- Mead Bank, Waupaca, Wisconsin, listed on the NRHP in Waupaca County, Wisconsin
- Mead Camp, Norfolk, Connecticut, listed on the NRHP in Litchfield County, Connecticut
