= Colorado Consistory No. 1 =

Building in Denver, Colorado, US

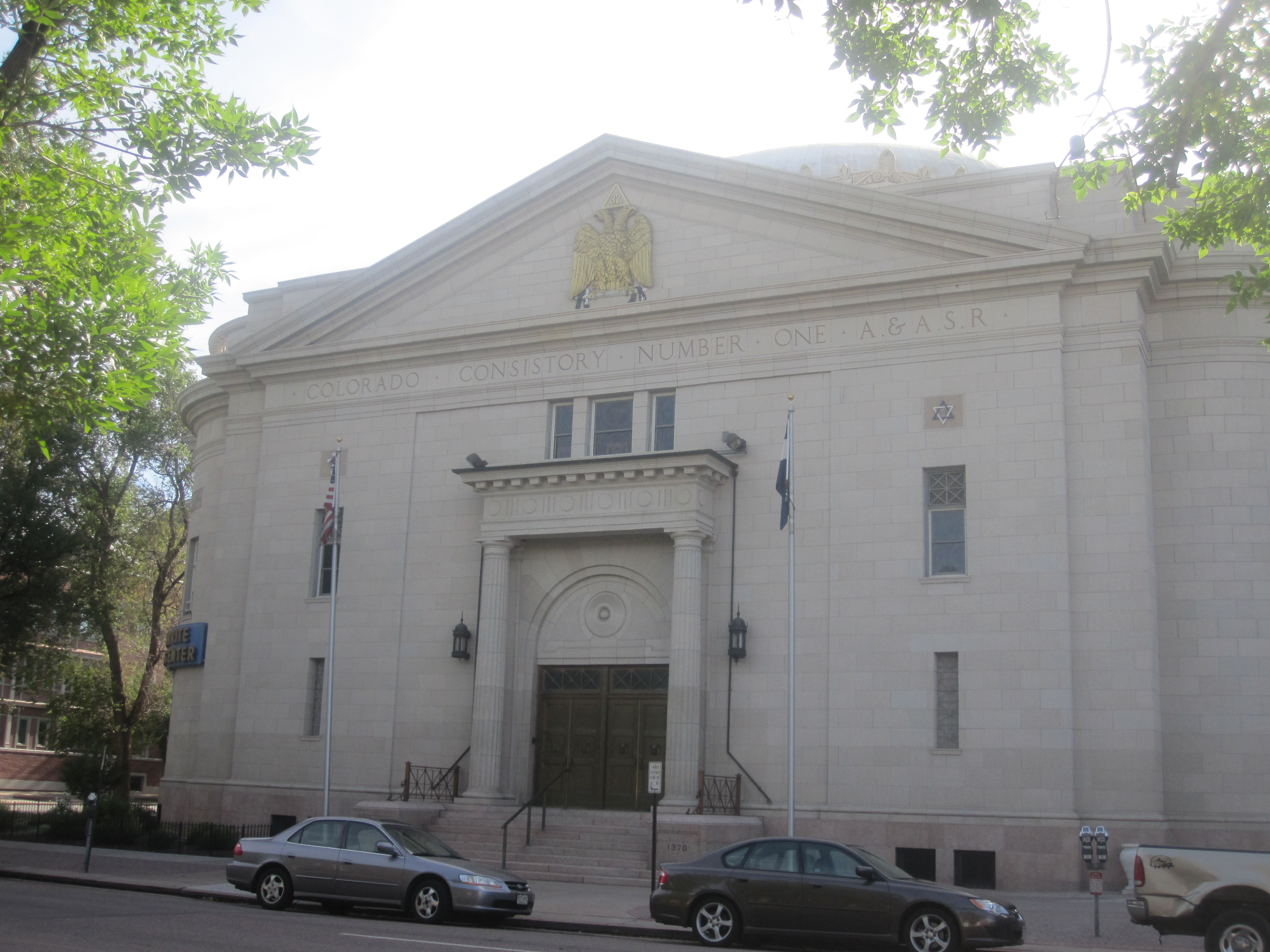

- Location within Colorado

General information
- Coordinates: 39.7382°N 104.9833°W
- Completed: 1925

Design and construction
- Architect: William Norman Bowman

The Colorado Consistory No. 1, also known as the Scottish Rite Masonic Center, is a Masonic building in Denver, Colorado, near the State Capitol building.

It was designed by architect William Norman Bowman for the Denver Scottish Rite chapter.

It is a three-story building which was built during 1923–1925, and was completed and dedicated in 1925.

It is also known as Scottish Rite Masonic Temple.
