= Joseph A. Woodbury House =

Historic house in Colorado, United States

- U.S. National Register of Historic Places
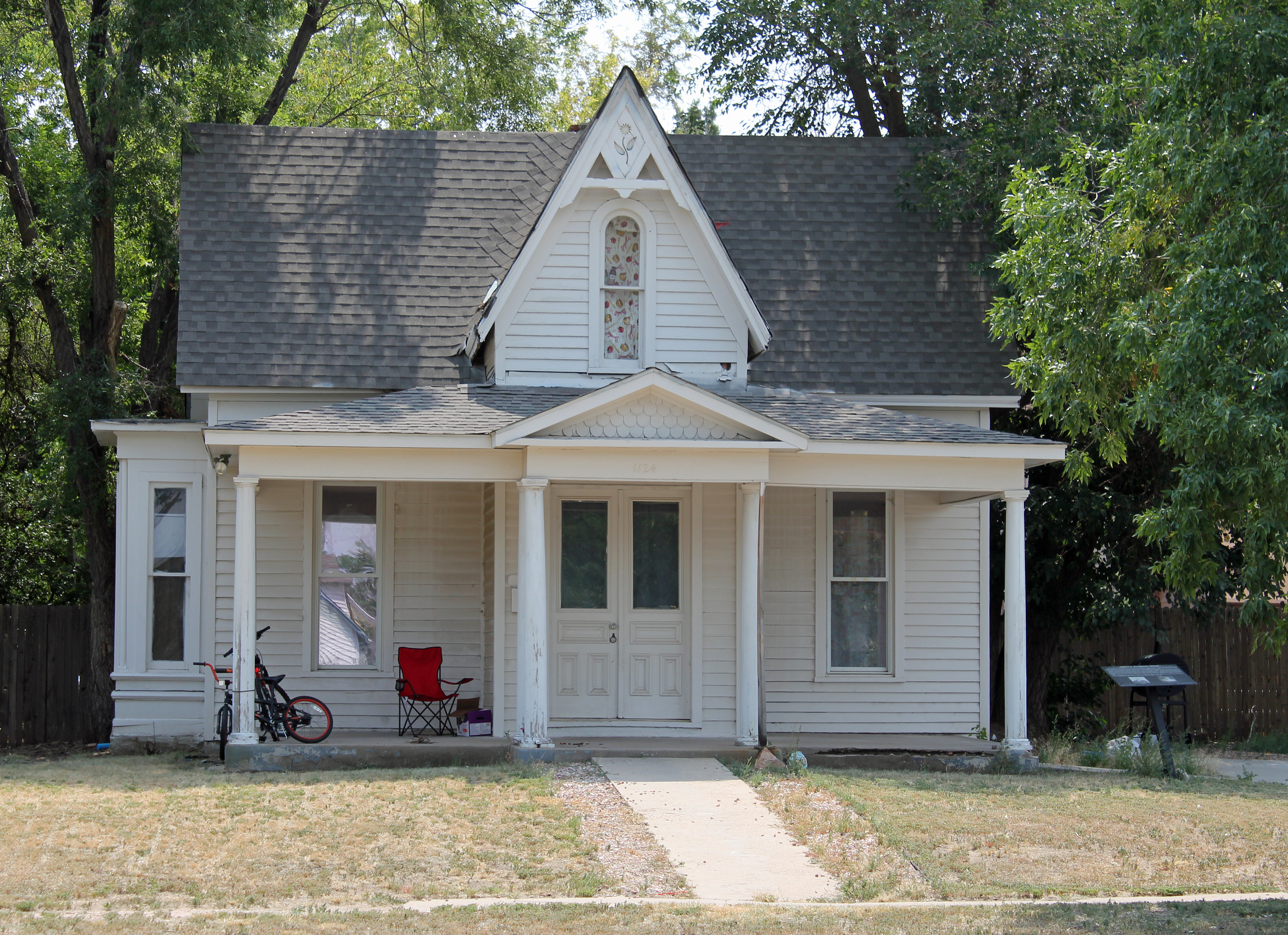
- The house in 2012

- Location within Colorado
- Location: 1124 7th Street, Greeley, Colorado
- Coordinates: 40°25′32″N 104°41′48″W
- Area: 0.1 acres (0.040 ha)
- Built: 1870
- Architectural style: Gothic Revival
- NRHP reference No.: 84000908
- Added to NRHP: May 17, 1984

The Joseph A. Woodbury House is a historic house in Greeley, Colorado. It was built in 1870 for Joseph A. Woodbury, a settler from Beverly, Massachusetts who built many houses in Greeley, including the Glazier House. It was designed in the Gothic Revival architectural style. It has been listed on the National Register of Historic Places since May 17, 1984.
