= SLW =

SLW or slw may refer to:

== Aviation ==
- Saltillo Airport (IATA code), Mexico

== Other uses ==
- Sialum language (ISO 639 code:slw)
- slw, a PowerPC logical shift operator
- Single-line working an emergency measure on railways to work in both directions over a single track

== See also ==
- SLW Ranch, an historic ranch in Colorado, US
- EuroStar SLW, an Evektor SportStar aircraft variant
