= Douglas City Hall =

- U.S. National Register of Historic Places
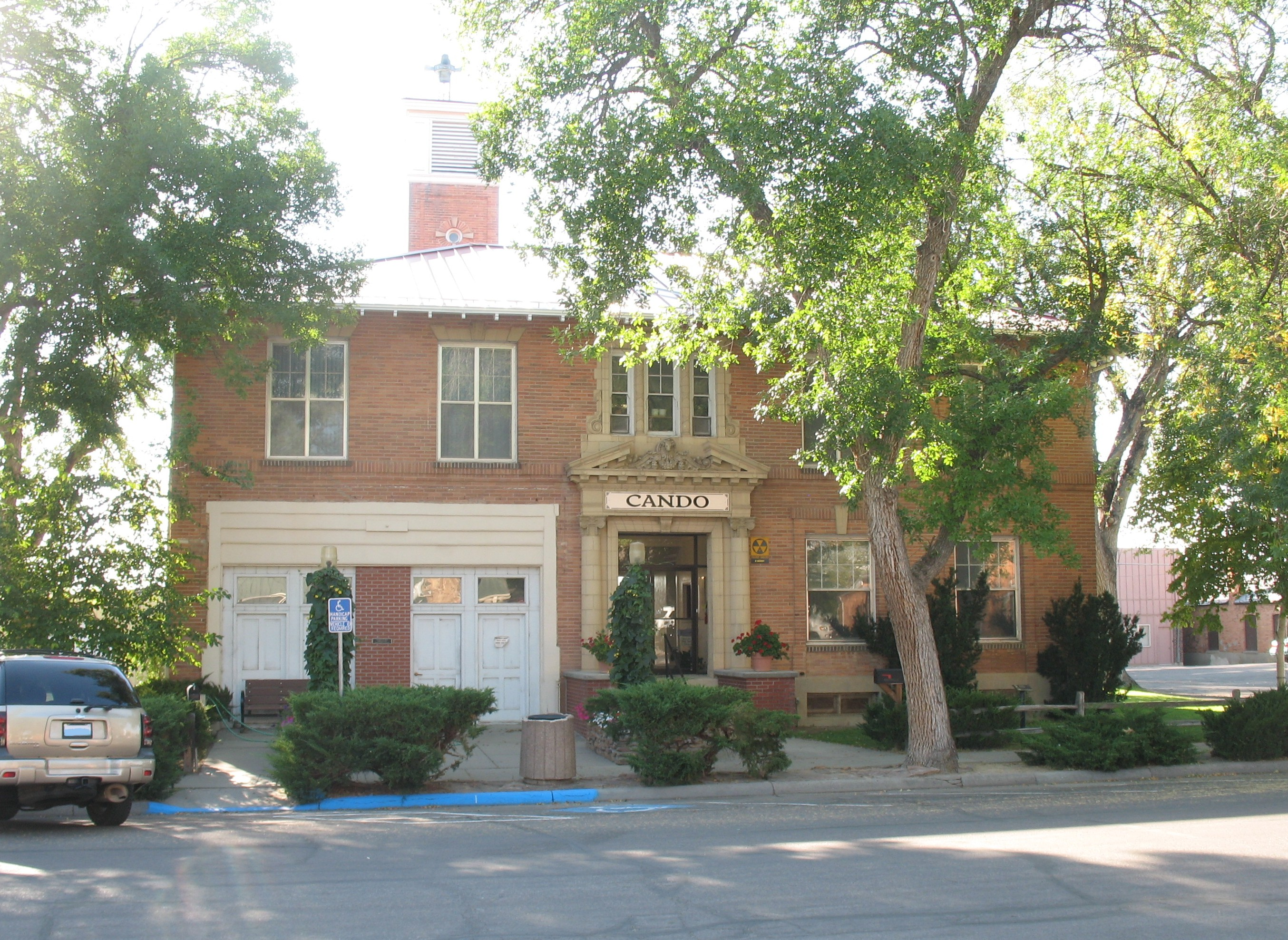

- Location within Wyoming Location within the United States
- Location: 130 S. Third St., Douglas, Wyoming
- Coordinates: 42°45′29″N 105°23′2″W
- Area: less than one acre
- Built: 1915–16
- Architect: William N. Bowman
- Architectural style: Georgian Revival
- NRHP reference No.: 94000167
- Added to NRHP: March 17, 1994

Douglas City Hall is a historic city hall located at 130 S. Third St. in Douglas, Wyoming. The building was constructed from 1915 to 1916 to serve as the center of government for Douglas. Architect William Norman Bowman, who also designed the Weld County Courthouse in Greeley, Colorado, designed the building in the Georgian Revival style. The brick building's design features a broken pediment over its front entrance supported by pilasters. The building includes a room on the second floor designed to house meetings of local civic groups. The Douglas Good Roads Club, which later became the Chamber of Commerce, was the first group to use the room extensively. The Douglas government moved out of the building in 1989, and it is now a commercial property.

The building was added to the National Register of Historic Places on March 17, 1994.
