= Von Trotha–Firestien Farm =

- Von Trotha–Firestien Farm at Bracewell
- U.S. National Register of Historic Places
- U.S. Historic district
- Location within Colorado Location within the United States
- Location: Junction of O St. and 83rd Ave., Bracewell, Colorado
- Coordinates: 40°27′32″N 104°49′0″W
- Area: 49 acres (20 ha)
- Built: 1911
- MPS: Historic Farms and Ranches of Weld County MPS
- NRHP reference No.: 09000291
- Added to NRHP: May 12, 2009

The Von Trotha–Firestien Farm is a historic farm near Bracewell in Weld County, Colorado, United States. The farm was established circa 1887 by the von Trotha family and expanded with the work of a family of Russian German immigrants, the Fiersteins, in the 1910s. Today, the farm is recognized as significant in the history of local agriculture, including the use of irrigation and advanced techniques of feeding livestock. It was added to the National Register of Historic Places on May 12, 2009.

== See also ==
- National Register of Historic Places listings in Weld County, Colorado
