= Meade House =

Meade House may refer to:

- Ward-Meade House, Topeka, Kansas, listed on the NRHP in Shawnee County
- Sunny Meade, Jennings, Louisiana, listed on the NRHP in Jefferson Davis Parish
- Judge C. D. Meade House, Pierre, South Dakota, listed on the NRHP in Hughes County
- Belle Meade Plantation, Nashville, Tennessee, a plantation house in Davidson County
- West Meade, Nashville, Tennessee, listed on the NRHP in Davidson County
- Woods-Meade House, Rocky Mount, Virginia, listed on the NRHP in Franklin County
- Capt. Matthew J. Meade House, Kaukauna, Wisconsin, listed on the NRHP in Outagamie County

== See also ==
- Mead House (disambiguation)
