= Greeley Tribune Building =

- U.S. National Register of Historic Places
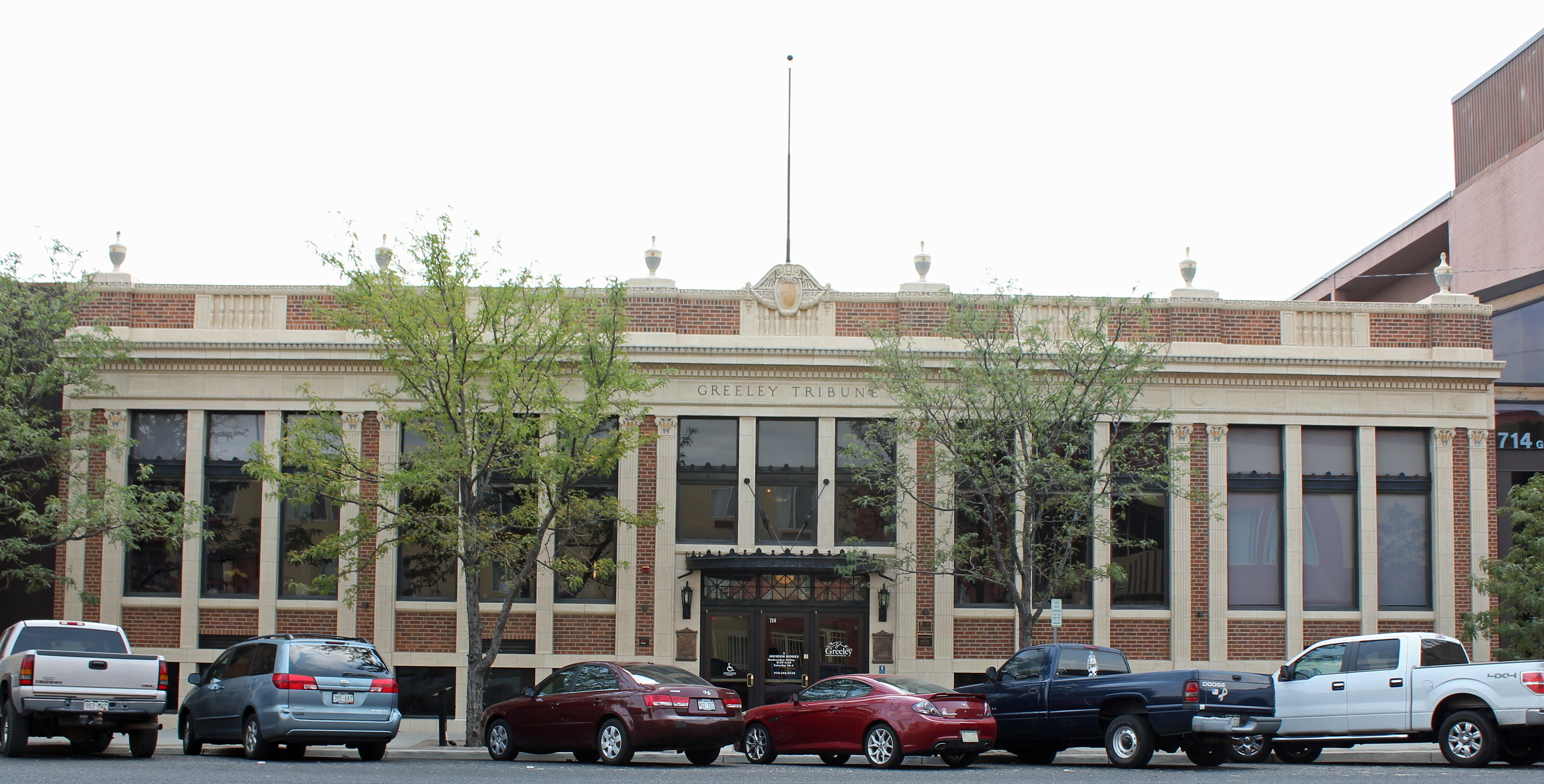

- Location within Colorado
- Location: 714 8th Street, Greeley, Colorado
- Coordinates: 40°25′29″N 104°41′22″W
- Area: less than one acre
- Built: 1929
- Architects: Sidney Frazier; Frank B. Anderson
- Architectural style: Beaux Arts
- NRHP reference No.: 07000310
- Added to NRHP: April 18, 2007

The Greeley Tribune Building is a historic building in Greeley, Colorado. It was built in 1929. It is home to the Greeley History Museum, and listed on the National Register of Historic Places.

== History ==
The building was erected for the Greeley Tribune, the main newspaper in Greeley, in 1929.

The building was purchased by the city of Greeley in 2003 to house a museum about the history of Greeley. It is now home to the Greeley History Museum and the Hazel E. Johnson Research Center.

== Architectural significance ==
The building was designed by architects Sidney Frazier and Frank B. Anderson in the Beaux Arts style. It has been listed on the National Register of Historic Places since April 18, 2007.
