= Fairplay Hotel =

- U.S. National Register of Historic Places
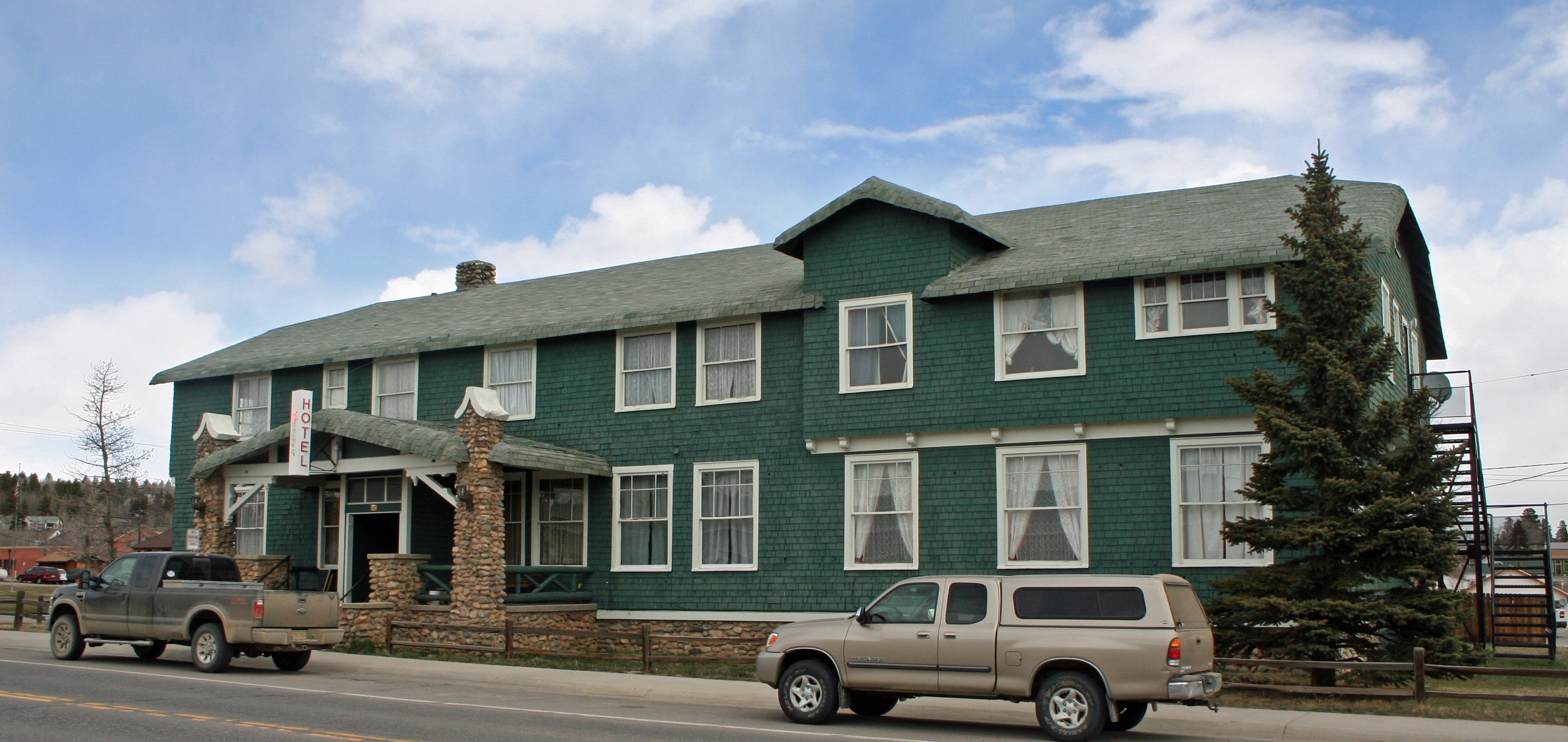
- Hotel in 2010

- Location within Colorado
- Location: 500 Main St., Fairplay, Colorado
- Coordinates: 39°13′29″N 106°00′03″W
- Area: less than one acre
- Architect: William N. Bowman
- Architectural style: Rustic
- NRHP reference No.: 07001395
- Added to NRHP: January 16, 2008

The Fairplay Hotel, a hotel at 500 Main St. in Fairplay, Colorado, was built in 1922. It was listed on the National Register of Historic Places in 2008.

Fairplay was a mining town; it is located in South Park and is the county seat of Park County.

It is designed in Rustic architecture style by prolific Denver architect William N. Bowman. The styling includes faux thatched roofing.

In 2004, a couple was trying to revive the hotel.
