= Meeker Memorial Museum =

- U.S. National Register of Historic Places
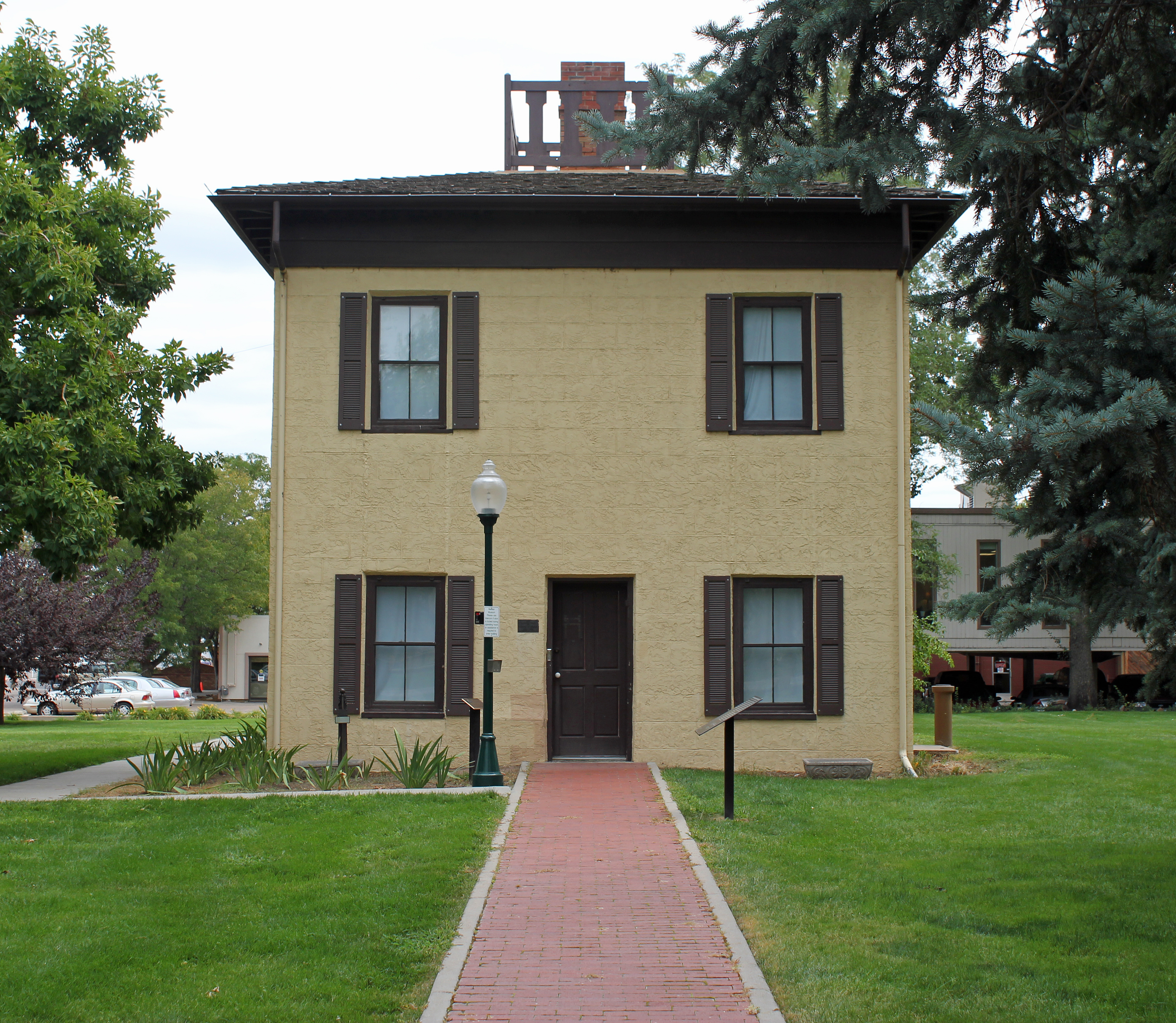
- The building in 2012

- Location within Colorado
- Location: 1324 9th Avenue, Greeley, Colorado
- Coordinates: 40°25′02″N 104°41′29″W
- Area: 0.8 acres (0.32 ha)
- Built: 1870
- NRHP reference No.: 70000168
- Added to NRHP: February 26, 1970

The Meeker Memorial Museum, also known as the N. C. Meeker Home, is a historic building in Greeley, Colorado. It was built as a private residence for Nathan Meeker in 1870. Meeker was a homesteader who founded the Union Colony of Colorado, later known as Greeley. The house was purchased by the city of Greeley in 1927, and later turned into a museum, the first in the town. It has been listed on the National Register of Historic Places since February 26, 1970.
