= Montrose County Courthouse =

- U.S. National Register of Historic Places
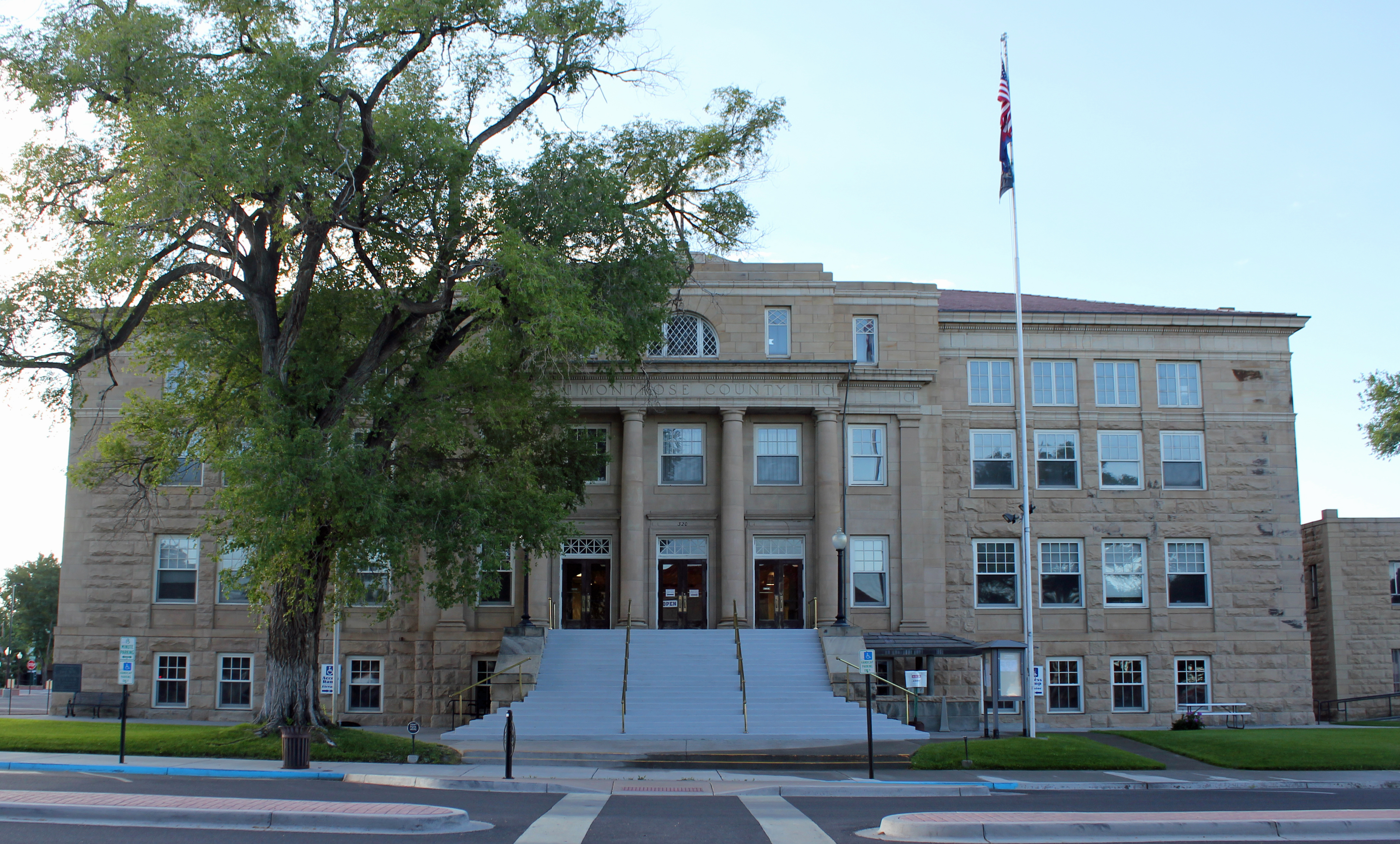
- The courthouse in 2014.

- Location within Colorado Location within the United States
- Interactive map showing the location of Montrose County Courthouse
- Location: 320 S. 1st St., Montrose, Colorado
- Coordinates: 38°28′41″N 107°52′31″W
- Built: 1922
- Architect: William Bowman Company
- Architectural style: Classical Revival
- NRHP reference No.: 94000040
- Added to NRHP: February 18, 1994

The Montrose County Courthouse stands three stories high in downtown Montrose, Colorado and was built in the Classical Revival style from locally quarried sandstone. It was listed on the National Register of Historic Places in 1994.

Denver architect William Norman Bowman designed the building, which was completed in 1923 and has undergone only minor alterations. The building features a projecting central bay of smooth-faced sandstone, stairs rising from street level, Roman Doric columns supporting a lintel engraved with the county's name, and three sets of double doors with grillwork transoms at the main entrance. The roof is made of red tile, and walls flanking the entry are made of rough sandstone.

A foyer inside the entrance has a vaulted ceiling with wainscotting, Doric columns, and marble pilasters. A bronze tablet lists 34 World War I veterans and a nurse from the county who died in the war or from war-related injuries.

The courthouse dominates the block, with only a small, two-story jail built in 1936 in a similar style.

The courthouse was built at a cost of $225,000 and was dedicated on Dec. 7, 1923. It replaced a courthouse converted from the town skating rink in 1885. The county's first courthouse after its creation in 1882 was an adobe building.
