= Yavapai County Courthouse =

- U.S. National Register of Historic Places
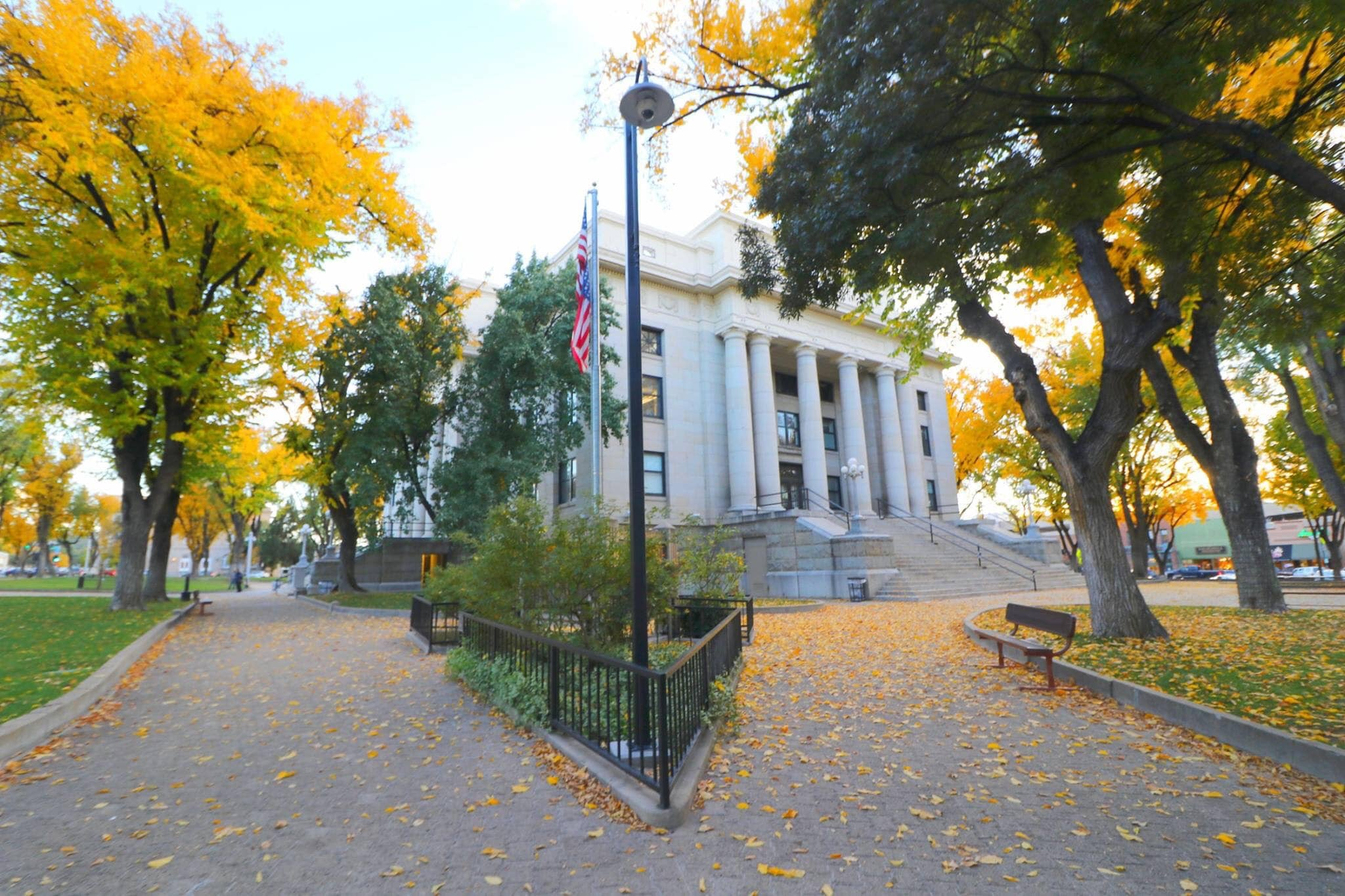
- The courthouse in 2017

- Location within Arizona Location within the United States
- Interactive map showing the location of Yavapai County Courthouse
- Location: 120 S. Cortez St., Prescott, Arizona
- Coordinates: 34°32′27″N 112°28′09″W
- Built: 1916
- Architect: William N. Bowman, Rogers & Ashton
- Architectural style: Classical Revival
- NRHP reference No.: 77000241
- Added to NRHP: April 13, 1977

The Yavapai County Courthouse is located at 120 South Cortez Street in Prescott, Arizona. The current courthouse building was built in 1916. It was designed by architect William N. Bowman (1868–1944) and it was added to the National Register of Historic Places in 1977. It is also known for its statue of Buckey O'Neill, a Rough Rider and former Mayor of Prescott. Arizona Senator Barry Goldwater announced his presidential candidacy in 1964 from the steps of the courthouse.

== History ==
=== 1800s ===
In the mid-1800s, Yavapai County decided to rent a courtroom space in a two-story wood building on the corner of Gurley and Cortez street. The ground floor held the jail and the upper floor provided offices and meeting places for the county commissioners. This building has since undergone many changes and currently it is a three-story Masonic Temple that is rented out by a dentist's office, jewelry store, and clothing boutique. It wasn't long before the board of supervisors decided to award a bid for a new courthouse and jail that would situated in the middle of town.

This bid was won by two local woodworkers named, Wilson and Haskell for $58,997.67 ($1,155,503.14 today).

In 1874 the 8th Infantry Regiment built a bandstand on the plaza and then the city officials planted some pine trees. They would later come to regret this. The building was completed on February 23, 1878. It had a basement, two-stories made up of red bricks, and a clock tower with a bell. The building was opened to the public on September 3, 1878. George Waters of Maine built the Victorian building with sandstone from the Verde Valley on the bottom floor and local bricks for the top floor. The contractor for the project, A.S Haskell said he nearly went bankrupt for completing the project. The clock with an 800-pound bell was delivered via the Colorado river from Howard Watch Co in Boston, Massachusetts.

The courthouse caught fire in 1892 after rain water seeped into the basement and mixed with lime. This bothered the court of supervisors and they began building a $800 addition to the building the same year. Two years later the building was wired for electricity and the newest addition to the courthouse had to be repaired due to the buildings separating. The last change to the Yavapai County Courthouse happened in 1895 when a new $200 octagonal bandstand was erected in time to celebrate the Fourth of July.

=== 1900s ===
The Prescott community raised enough money to build the statue to honor the Rough Rider heroes from the 1898 Spanish–American War. In 1908 they added braces to the clock tower to prevent it from swaying in the wind and ringing the bell. A year later President William Howard Taft visited Prescott and the courthouse was decorated. In 1910 a new fountain was installed with two basins and a statue. They also planted a Deodar Cedar tree in the northeast quadrant of the plaza to commemorate Arizona's statehood. The Boy Scouts placed a plaque on a granite rock in front of this tree, designating it as the "Arizona Statehood Tree".

When Arizona became an official state in 1912, Yavapai County decided to build a new courthouse as well. The Prescott Journal Miner said that "the old courthouse is a fire trap.", so the board of supervisors voted once again on February 16, 1916, to accept the building plans of W.N Bowman of Denver, Colorado. The newspaper reported that, "the southwest side of the courthouse is ready to collapse." They rent the Odd Fellows Building for the county recorder, the second floor of the Union Block building for BOS, Treasurer, Assessor, Superintendent of Schools, and they temporarily hold court in the Elks Theatre building.

In October 1916 the cornerstone is laid and construction begins on the new courthouse building. Italian stonemasons query the granite and the new Neoclassical Revival building begins to take shape. New sidewalks are installed and in September 1918, the courthouse is complete. New York Mayor Fiorello La Guardia visits the courthouse and delivers a speech on the steps in 1938. Today the La Guardia Bridge is named in his honor. The first courthouse lighting is held in 1954 by the Business and Professional Women. Senator Barry Goldwater announced his presidential candidacy in 1964 from the steps of the courthouse.

In 1971 the public restrooms were added underneath the stairs on the western side of the courthouse. This was due to the increased population and events that were being held on the plaza. The Yavapai County Courthouse is added to the National Register of Historic Places in 1977. The 1910 fountain is removed and the "Lady Ermintrude" statue is given to Sharlot Hall Museum after a winter freeze. In 1986 the Prescott Kiwanis Club donates a brand new centerpiece for the fountain and in 1989 the All-Veterans Memorial is added to the west side of the plaza. The Yavapai County Courthouse also adds a "Cowboy At Rest" statue on the south side of the plaza.

=== 2000s–present ===
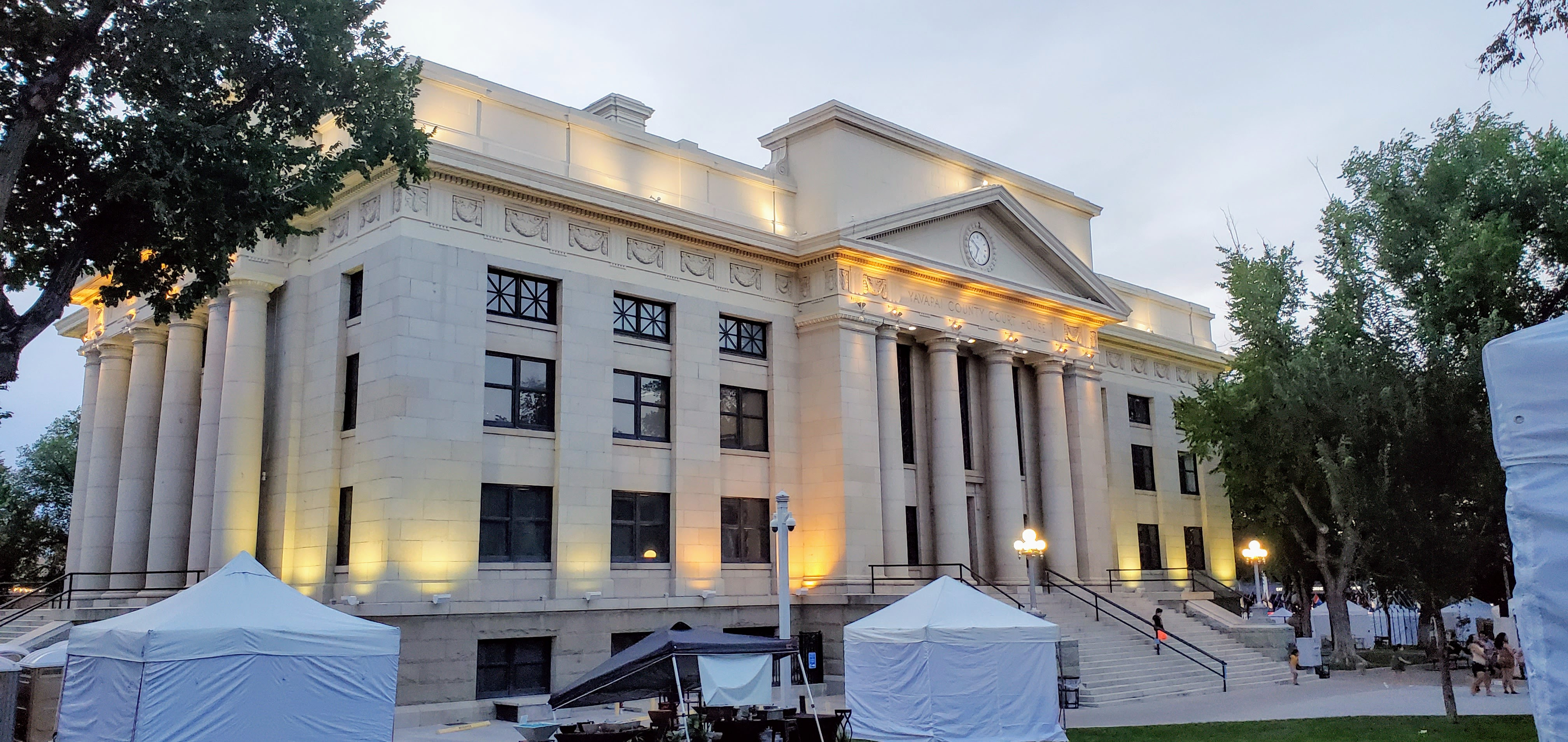
Yavapai County Courthouse at Sundown, 2020

In 2000, presidential nominee President George W. Bush visits the Prescott Courthouse. In 2008, presidential nominee John McCain visits the Prescott Courthouse. This is his only stop in his home state of Arizona. The Yavapai County Courthouse is listed as one of the Top 10 Public Places in America by the American Planning Association.

County officials discovered the surviving "Lady Ermintrude" fountain components and a restoration project began. A foundry in Alabama that had the original statue pattern was commissioned and the missing and broken pieces were recast. The National Association of Counties (NACO) awards Yavapai County with a National Achievements Award in the category of Arts, Culture and Historic Preservation for the restoration of the Historic Yavapai County Courthouse Plaza “Lady Ermintrude” Fountain. A re-dedication ceremony for the fountain is held on June 29, 2018.

== Architecture ==
The Neoclassical Revival Style was popular from 1895 to 1950. Neoclassical Revival Characteristics include: 1/2.5 stories high, side-gabled or hipped, medium pitched roofs, boxed eaves with a moderate overhang, decorative surrounds on doorways, balustrades on porches, and a wide variety of different window configurations including paired, triple, bayed or arched.

Antique Home Style says, "The interest in Neoclassical Revival style stemmed primarily from the 1893 Columbian World Exposition in Chicago and the creation of the "White City." The most notable architects of the day designed classically inspired buildings to house the many exhibits at the fair. Spectacularly, the buildings were lighted at night with strings of electric lights. The effect inspired a generation of builders and architects. Though it was used for residences, Neoclassical Revival was more prominently used for public buildings and banks ... institutions where gravitas was expected."
