= Glazier House =

Historic house in Colorado, United States

- U.S. National Register of Historic Places
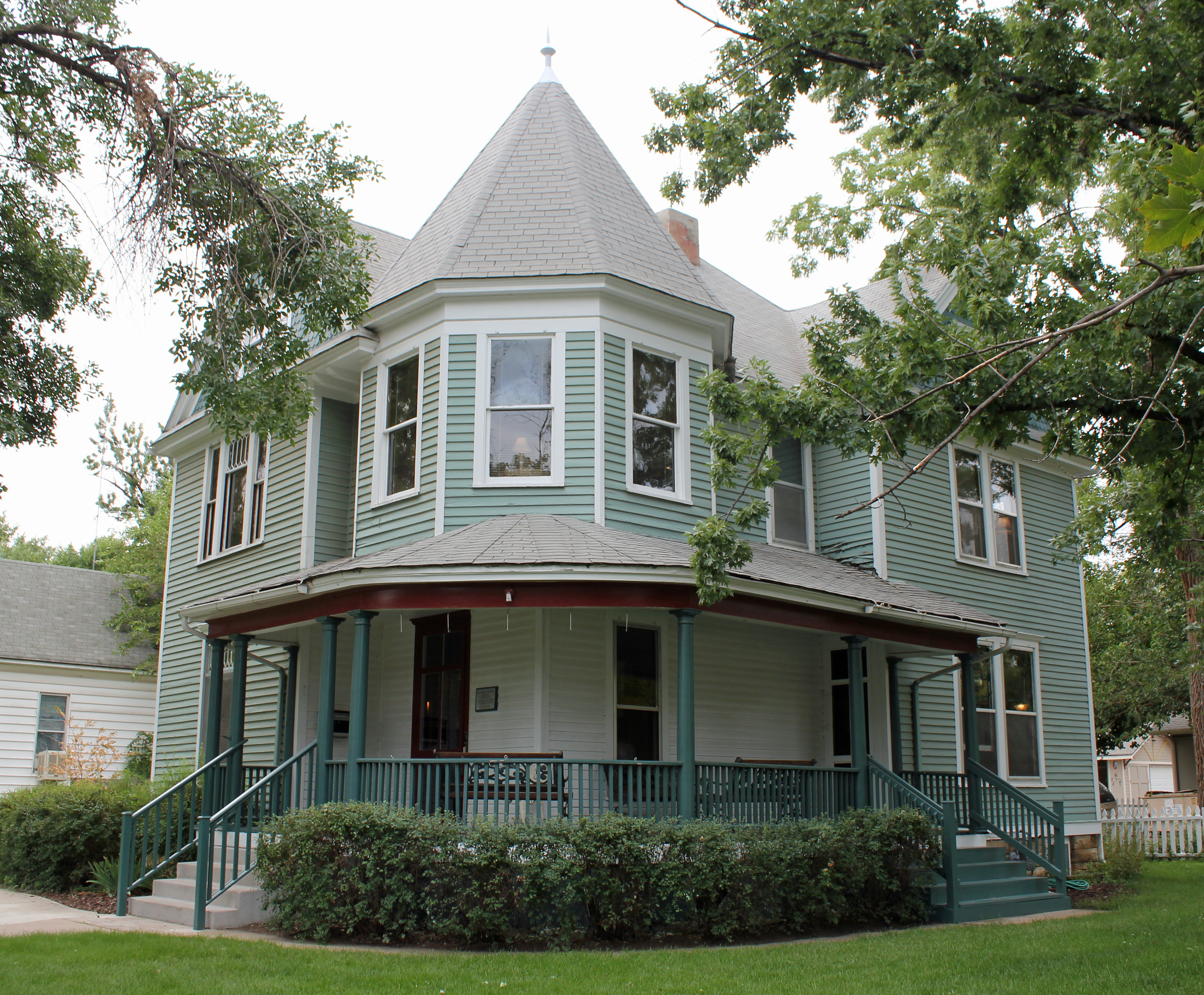
- The house in 2012

- Location within Colorado
- Location: 1403 10th Avenue, Greeley, Colorado
- Coordinates: 40°25′00″N 104°41′39″W
- Area: less than one acre
- Built: 1902
- Built by: J.A. Woodbury
- Architectural style: Queen Anne
- NRHP reference No.: 91000002
- Added to NRHP: February 5, 1991

The Glazier House is a historic house in Greeley, Colorado. It was built by J. A. Woodbury for a jeweler named I. O. Glazier in 1902. Glazier was also the director of the choir at the First Baptist Church. The house was designed in the Queen Anne architectural style, with two gabled bays. It has been listed on the National Register of Historic Places since February 5, 1991.
