= Colorado Building =

- U.S. National Register of Historic Places
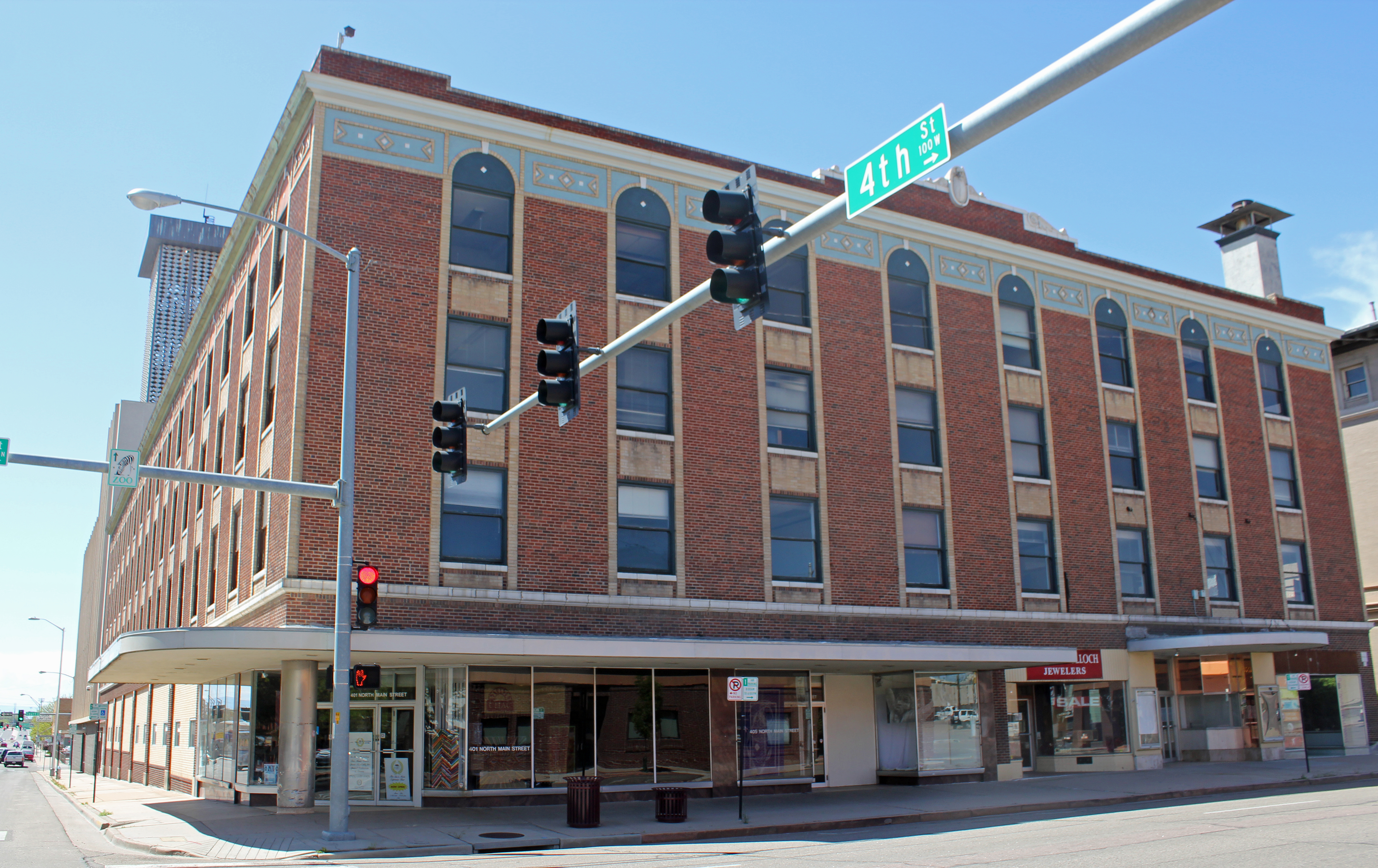

- Location within Colorado Location within the United States
- Location: 401--411 N. Main St., Pueblo, Colorado
- Coordinates: 38°16′15″N 104°36′30″W
- Area: 1 acre (0.40 ha)
- Built: 1925
- Architect: William N. Bowman Co.
- Architectural style: Early Commercial
- NRHP reference No.: 92000315
- Added to NRHP: April 17, 1992

The Colorado Building is a historic commercial building located at 401-411 North Main Street in Downtown Pueblo, Colorado, USA. The building was built in 1925 for the Southern Colorado Investment Company, and was designed by the William N. Bowman Co. It was added to the National Register of Historic Places on April 17, 1992.

It is a four-story building with tapestry brick, predominantly dark red, on its facades. It has vertical divisions of windows set off by columns of off-white brick. It has eight of these divisions on its Main Street facade, and 16 vertical divisions on its 4th Street facade. It has rectangular white panels, outlined in red, under each window on its second, third, and fourth floors, which were to hold 160 office rooms. It has a parapet and it has a terra cotta frieze just below its cornice.
