= United Church of Christ of Highlandlake =

Historic church in Colorado, United States

- U.S. National Register of Historic Places
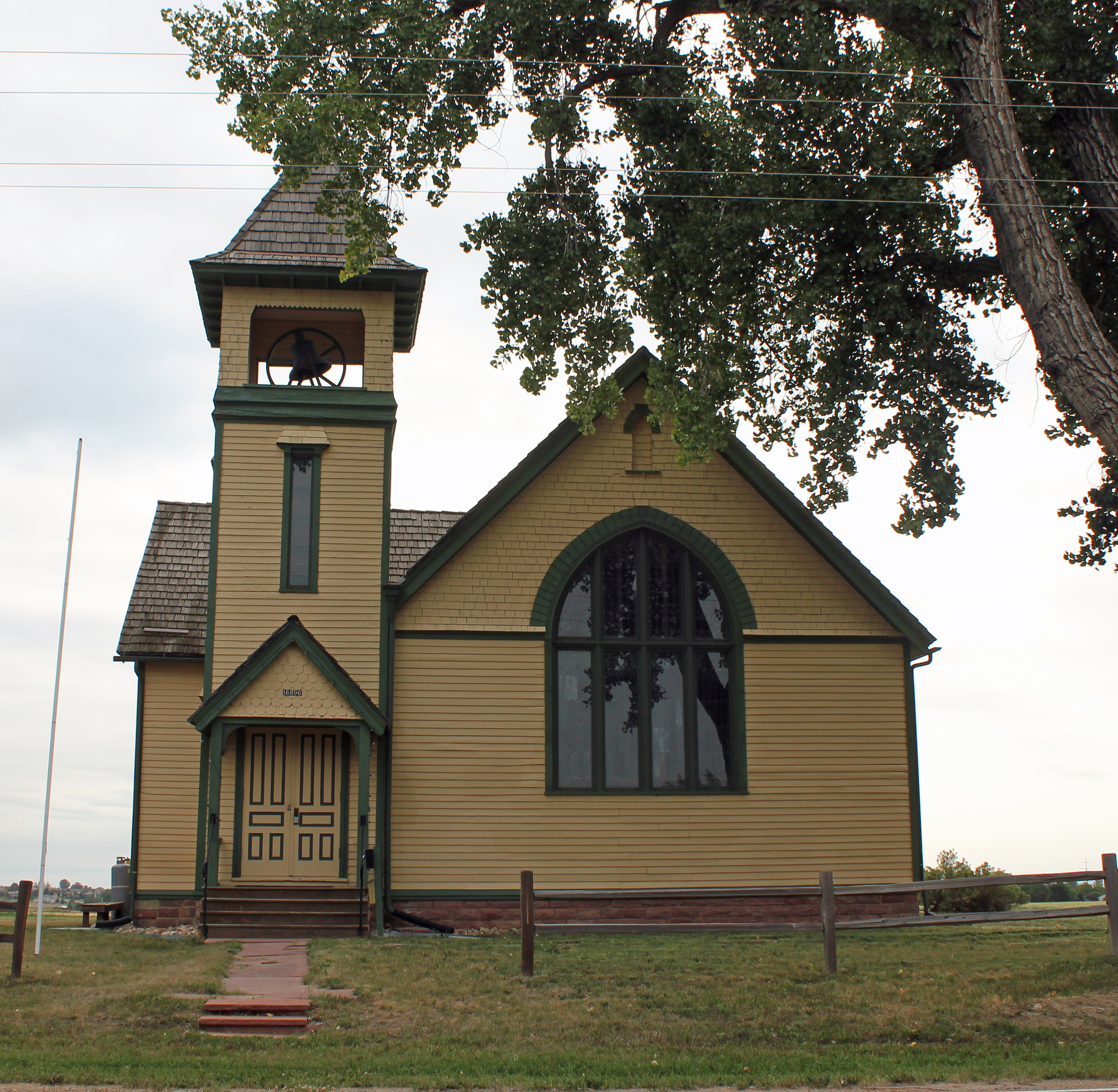

- Location within Colorado Location within the United States
- Nearest city: Mead, Colorado
- Coordinates: 40°14′55″N 105°0′50″W
- Area: less than one acre
- Built: 1896
- Architectural style: Vernacular wood frame
- NRHP reference No.: 88002237
- Added to NRHP: February 10, 1989

The United Church of Christ of Highlandlake is a historic church near Mead, Colorado. It was listed on the National Register of Historic Places in 1989.

It has stained glass windows, which were not common among the wood-frame churches on Colorado's plains.

Built in 1896, the church is typical of Eastern Colorado's wooden-frame vernacular churches of the era. The Highlandlake United Church of Christ congregation formed in 1881; until it was able to raise the money for a church building, it met in the town's school. Mary G. Bumstead, the church's first permanent minister and a rare example of a woman leading a congregation at the time, was instrumental in the church's fundraising efforts. The church features a clapboard exterior, a belfry, and stained glass windows; the latter are uncommon in vernacular churches due to their expense, and were funded through gifts Bumstead solicited. The church is the last original community building in Highlandlake, as most of its residents moved to Mead when the railroad bypassed Highlandlake.

The church was used briefly in 1989 for the filming of the movie Die Hard 2, producers paid for a new roof and built a fake entranceway, with front doors and matching facade onto the rear of the building.
