= Scotts Bluff County Courthouse =

- U.S. National Register of Historic Places
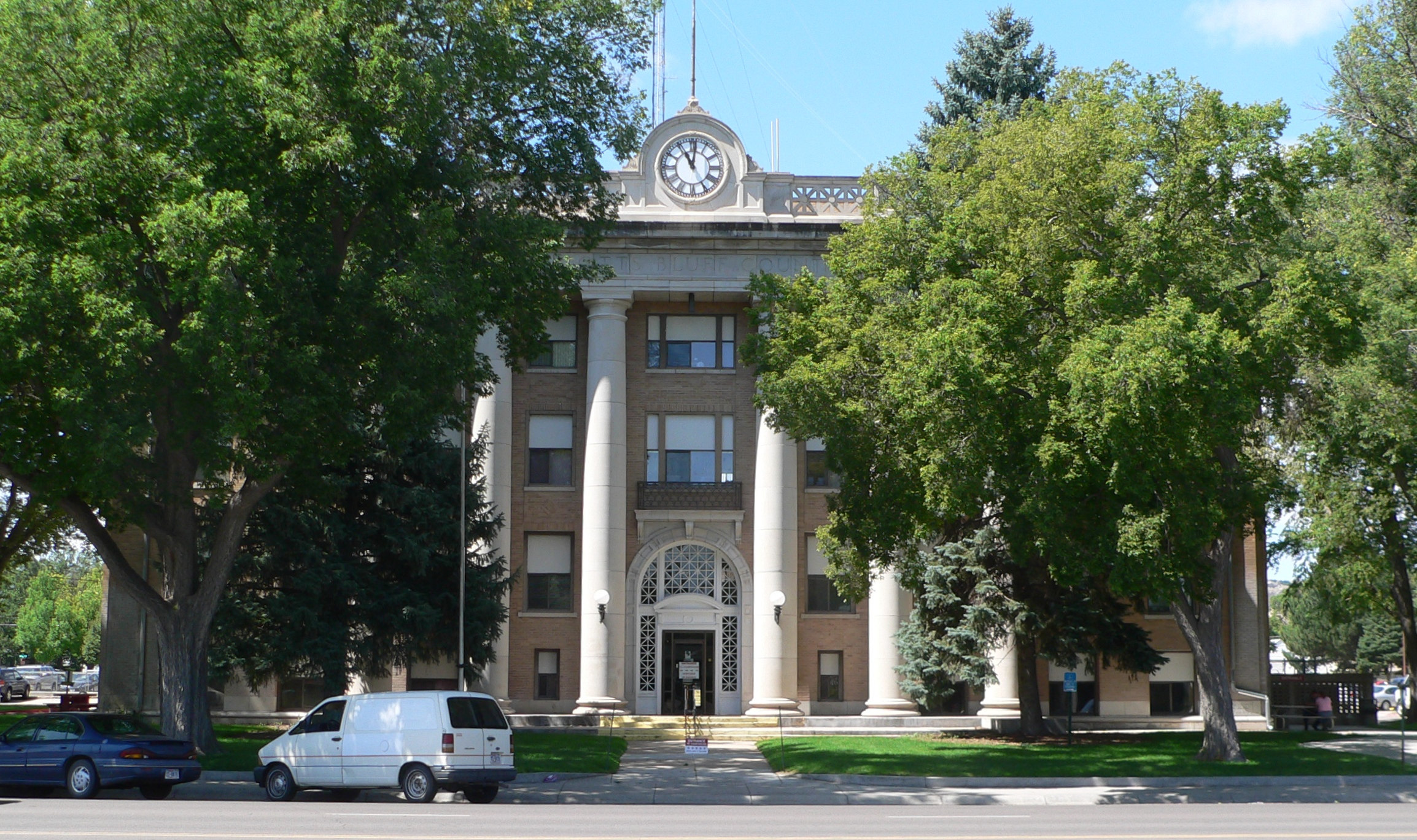
- The courthouse in 2010

- Location within Nebraska Location within the United States
- Interactive map showing the location of Scotts Bluff County Courthouse
- Location: 10th and Q Streets, Gering, Nebraska
- Coordinates: 41°49′35″N 103°39′37″W
- Area: 2 acres (0.81 ha)
- Built: 1920
- Built by: Mr. Goodhand
- Architect: William N. Bowman
- Architectural style: Classical Revival
- MPS: County Courthouses of Nebraska MPS
- NRHP reference No.: 89002230
- Added to NRHP: January 10, 1990

The Scotts Bluff County Courthouse is a historic building in Gering, Nebraska, and the courthouse of Scotts Bluff County, Nebraska. It was built in 1920, and designed in the Classical Revival style, with "symmetric arrangement, monumental shapes, smooth surface finish, a relatively simple entablature, and colossal columns." It was listed on the National Register of Historic Places in 1990.

It was designed by Denver architect William N. Bowman.
