= Greeley Masonic Temple =

- U.S. National Register of Historic Places
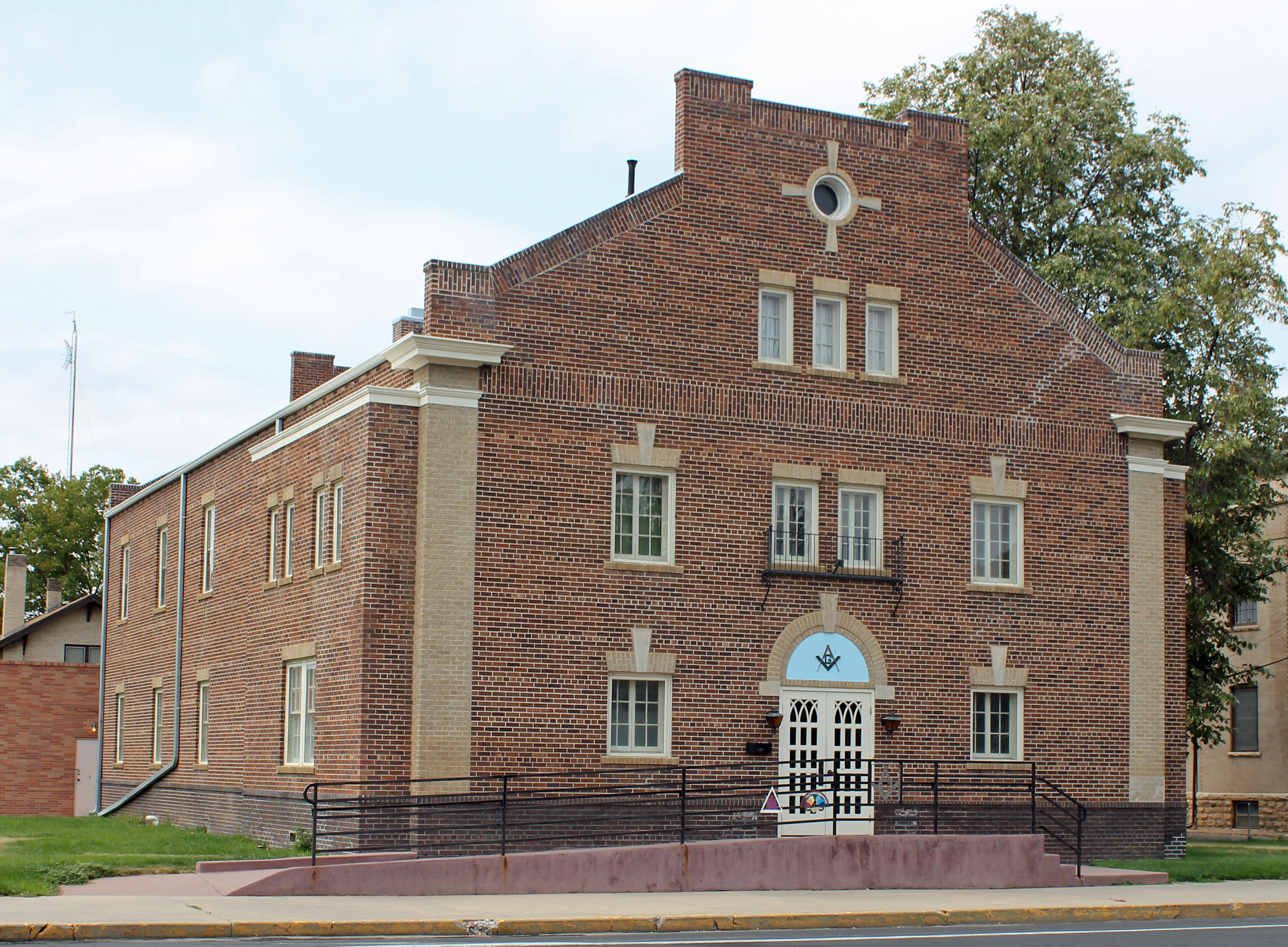

- Location within Colorado Location within the United States
- Location: 829 10th Ave., Greeley, Colorado
- Coordinates: 40°25′27″N 104°41′39″W
- Area: less than one acre
- Architect: Bowman, William N.
- Architectural style: Colonial Revival
- NRHP reference No.: 04000663
- Added to NRHP: July 7, 2004

The Greeley Masonic Temple is a Colonial Revival style historic building in Greeley, Colorado. It was built in 1927 and was listed on the National Register of Historic Places in 2004.

The building was deemed architecturally significant as a work by architect William N. Bowman. It is a brick building with blond brick pilasters. Within the Colonial Revival style generally, it reflects "a modernist interpretation of Georgian Revival architecture".

Bowman was a prolific architect, a Mason, and had been president of Colorado's chapter of the American Institute of Architects during 1917 to 1919.

== See also ==
- National Register of Historic Places listings in Weld County, Colorado
