= First Baptist Church (Greeley, Colorado) =

Historic church in Colorado, United States

- U.S. National Register of Historic Places
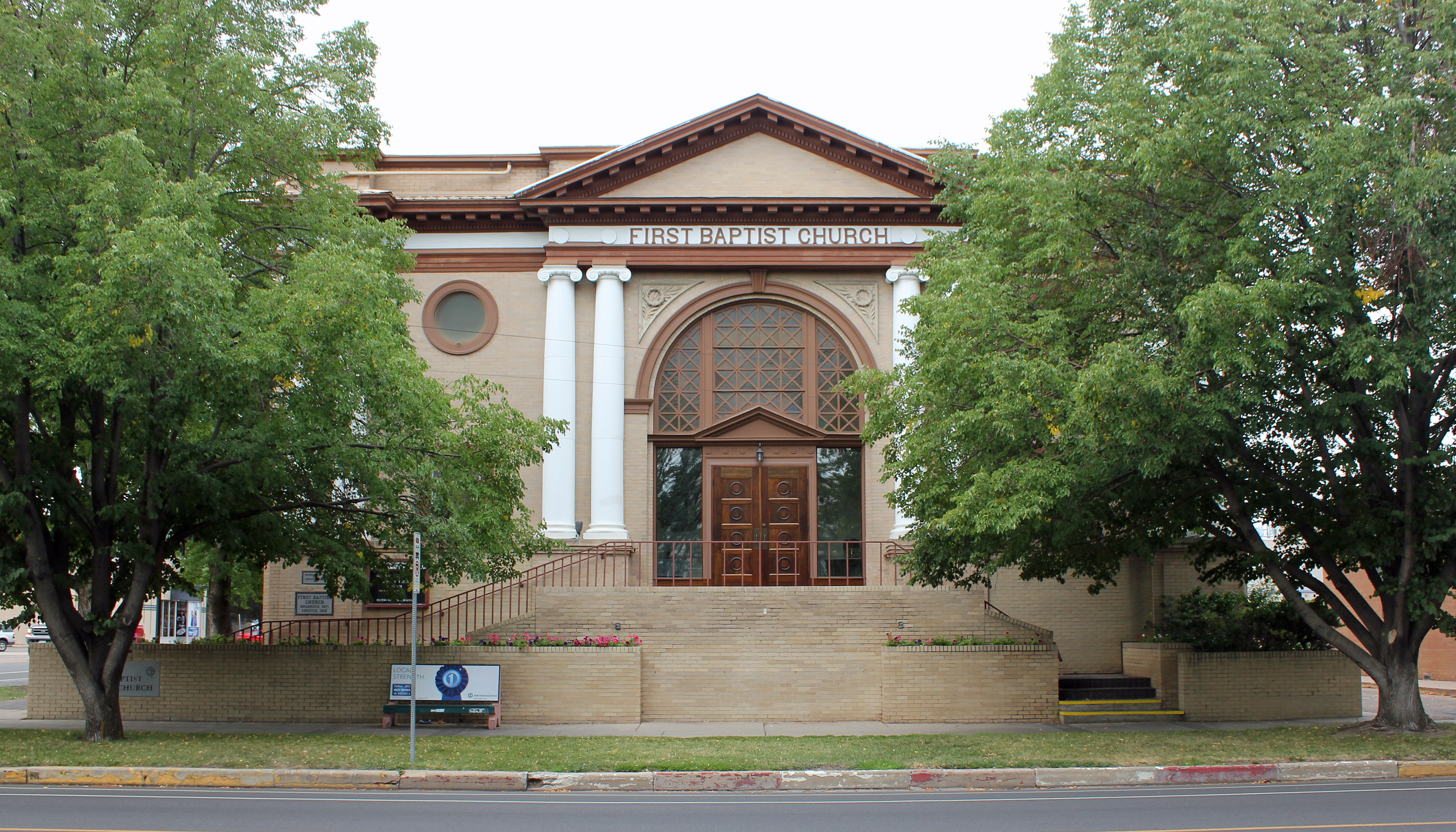

- Location within Colorado Location within the United States
- Location: Tenth Ave. at Eleventh St., NW corner, Greeley, Colorado
- Coordinates: 40°25′18″N 104°41′39″W
- Area: less than one acre
- Built: 1911
- Architect: T. Robert Weiger
- Architectural style: Neo-Classical
- NRHP reference No.: 87001510
- Added to NRHP: November 25, 1987

The First Baptist Church in Greeley, Colorado is a historic Baptist church at Tenth Avenue and Eleventh Street, on the northwest corner. It was built in 1911 and added to the National Register of Historic Places in 1987.

It was designed by Denver architect T. Robert Wieger, who also designed the National Register listed Stanley Hotel in Estes Park.

== See also ==
- National Register of Historic Places listings in Weld County, Colorado
