= Alpheus Mead House =

Historic house in Massachusetts, United States

- U.S. National Register of Historic Places
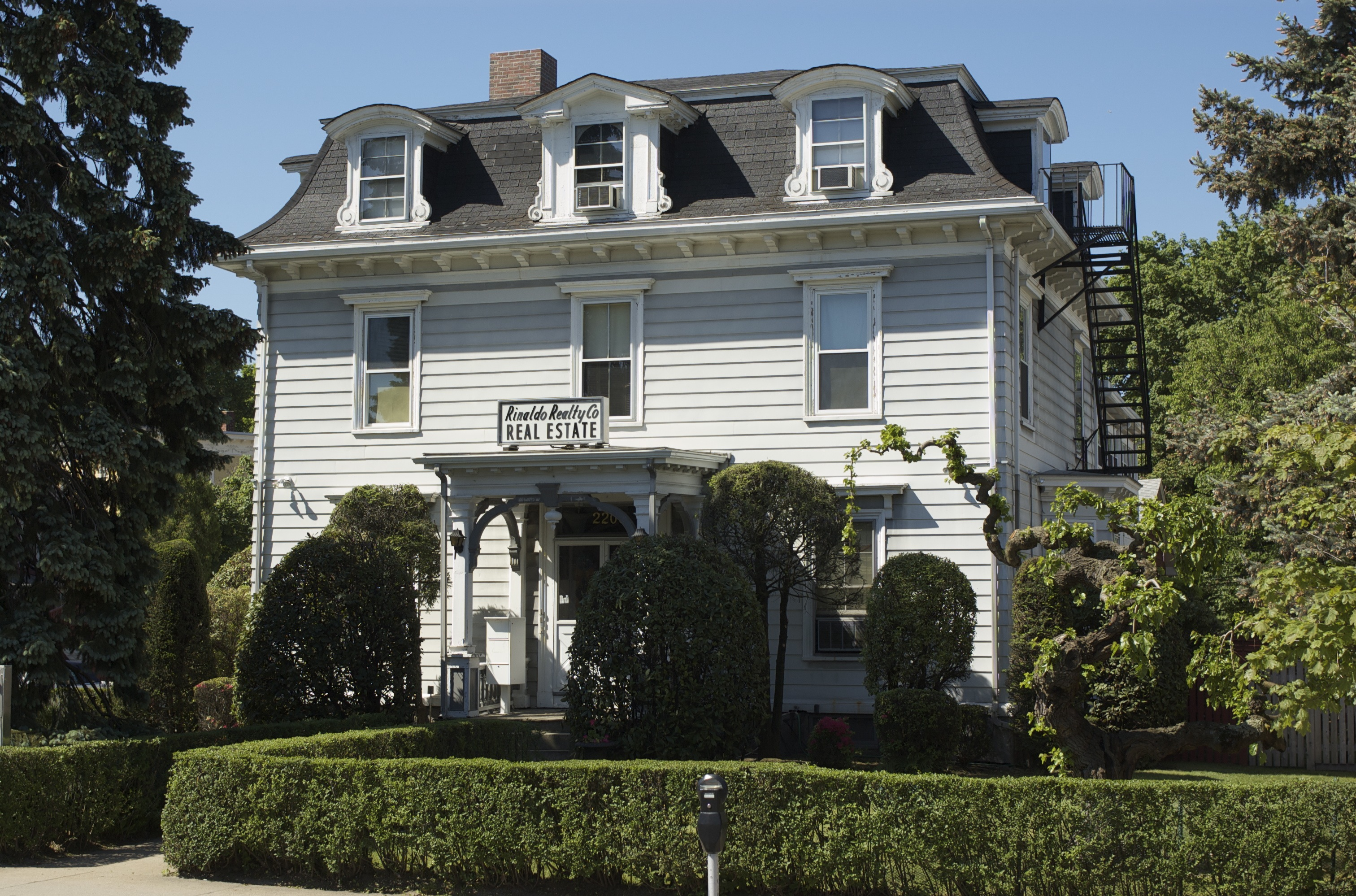

- Location within Massachusetts
- Location: 2200 Massachusetts Ave., Cambridge, Massachusetts
- Coordinates: 42°23′34.69″N 71°7′32.77″W
- Area: less than one acre
- Built: 1867
- Architectural style: Second Empire
- MPS: Cambridge MRA
- NRHP reference No.: 82001961
- Added to NRHP: April 13, 1982

The Alpheus Mead House is a historic house located along Massachusetts Avenue in Cambridge, Massachusetts, United States.

== Description ==
The house has a 2 1/2-story wood-frame structure with a mansard roof. Dormers piercing the roof are topped either by shallow gables or segmented-arch roofs. Modillions line the main roof eave and windows are topped by over-length projecting lintels. The house has also retained its elaborately decorated porch. Built in the mid-1860s, this Second Empire house is one of just a few such houses to survive along Massachusetts Avenue. Its first documented owner was Alpheus Mead, a butcher.

The house was listed on the National Register of Historic Places in 1982.

== See also ==
- National Register of Historic Places listings in Cambridge, Massachusetts
