= SLW Ranch =

- U.S. National Register of Historic Places
- U.S. Historic district
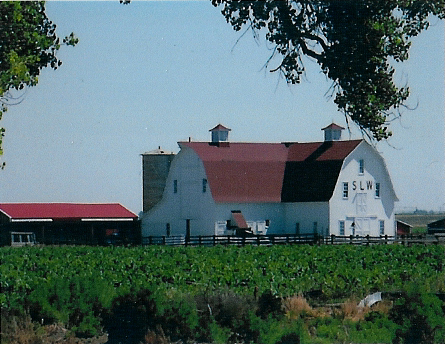
- The SLW Ranch

- Location within Colorado Location within the United States
- Location: Weld County, Colorado, USA
- Nearest city: Greeley, Colorado
- Coordinates: 40°24′53″N 104°29′34″W
- Area: 2,200 acres (8.9 km^{2})
- Built: 1880
- Architect: Multiple
- Architectural style: Vernacular wood frame
- MPS: Historic Farms and Ranches of Weld County MPS
- NRHP reference No.: 91000288
- Added to NRHP: March 15, 1991

The SLW Ranch, located on property formerly known as the Percheron-Norman Horse Ranch, is an historic ranch located approximately 8 miles (13 km) east of Greeley, Colorado, near the confluence of the Platte River and Crow Creek. In 1998 it was honored by the Colorado Historical Society as a Centennial Ranch.

It was listed in the National Register of Historic Places in 1991. The listing included 17 contributing buildings, 12 contributing structures, and a contributing site on 2,200 acres (8.9 km^{2}).

The SLW Ranch is named for the three initial partners - S for John Studebaker of wagon and automotive manufacturing fame, L for Lafayette Lamb, a lumber company executive and W for Harvey E Witwer, a nephew of Studebaker and managing partner.

== History ==
In 1889 Studebaker and Lamb formed the Crow Creek Land Company on property purchased from “Lord” Lyulph Ogilvy, second son of the ninth Earl of Airlie. They leased the land to the Percheron-Norman Horse Ranch, which at one point ranch was one of the largest horse operations in America, spanning 22,000 acres (89 km^{2}) with 2,600 brood mares. In 1899 the SLW Ranch partnership was formed. In addition to the draft horses, the ranch was home to a small herd of white-faced cattle. Witwer continued to purchase Hereford cattle from ranches back East until the herd was 1,500 head. In order to promote strong healthy cattle with desirable traits, the herd was registered and began breeding operations.

In 1909 Witwer approached his partners with the idea of purchasing their shares in the ranch. The sale was completed in 1913, and over the course of the next few years the SLW Ranch operation switched exclusively to a cattle operation. The ranch is home to one of the oldest, continuously operating Hereford ranches in the country and for many years was the oldest registered Hereford herd in Colorado. Harvey Witwer and his wife Bertha had two sons, Stow Lathrop and Harvey E. Jr. and a daughter, Mary Frances. The sons became actively involved with operating the ranch and looked for ways to increase the stability and profitability of a somewhat volatile business.

In the 1920s, at Stow's urging, the ranch became a dude ranch. Visitors would come from all over for a taste of the western life on a real working ranch. The original 12 room Ogilvy home was converted to accommodations for guests, who by the 1930s were paying $35 a week for room, board and activities. The income from the dudes provided money when the cattle operation took a bad turn and the 9,000-acre (36 km^{2}) ranch faced foreclosure. Stow and Harvey Jr. worked with Federal Land Bank and were able to retain approximately 3,500 acres (14 km^{2}). The ranch continued taking dudes until 1942, returning to a working cattle ranch that is still in operation today.

== Witwer family ==
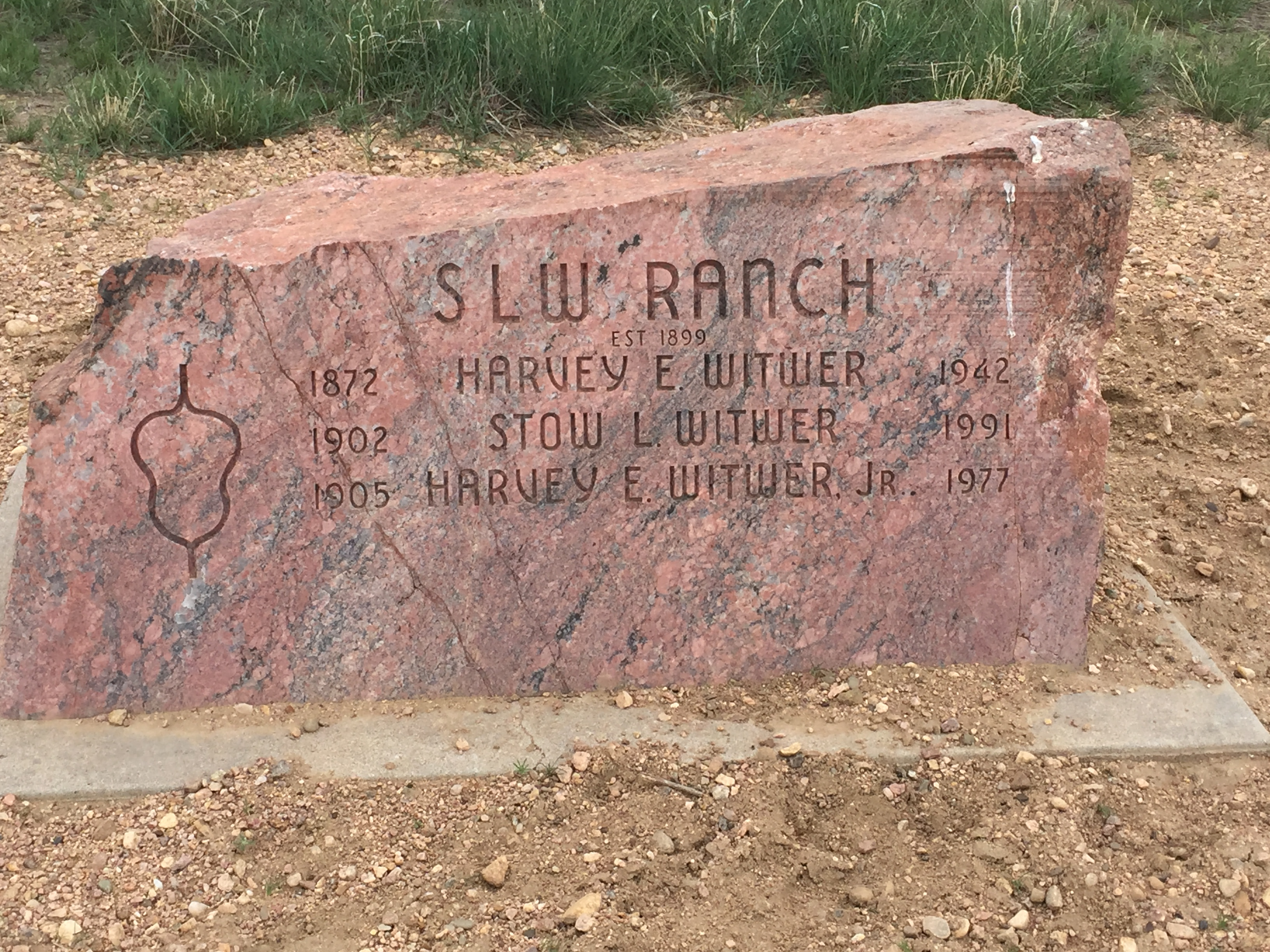
A stone memorial located on the ranch overlooking the pasture

As the sons became more active in the cattle operations, Harvey Witwer Sr. retired from ranching and entered politics in Weld County. In 1933 he was elected County Treasurer, an office he held until his death in 1942.

Stow married Clara Steele in 1926. They raised three children on the ranch, Joy (Witwer) Thomson, Carol (Witwer) Worth and Stow Witwer Jr.. Stow Sr operated the ranch until his death in 1991 and his descendants still maintain and operate the business.

Harvey Jr. married Marion Giddings and they had two daughters, Julie (Witwer) Shade and Linda (Witwer) Bonnett.

Mary Frances married Alexander McLeish and they had twin sons, Doug and Don McLeish.

Opening in 2022 and located within the Hutchison Family Stockyards Event Center, the Stow L. Witwer Memorial Show Arena will honor the Witwer family’s legendary history with the National Western Stock Show.

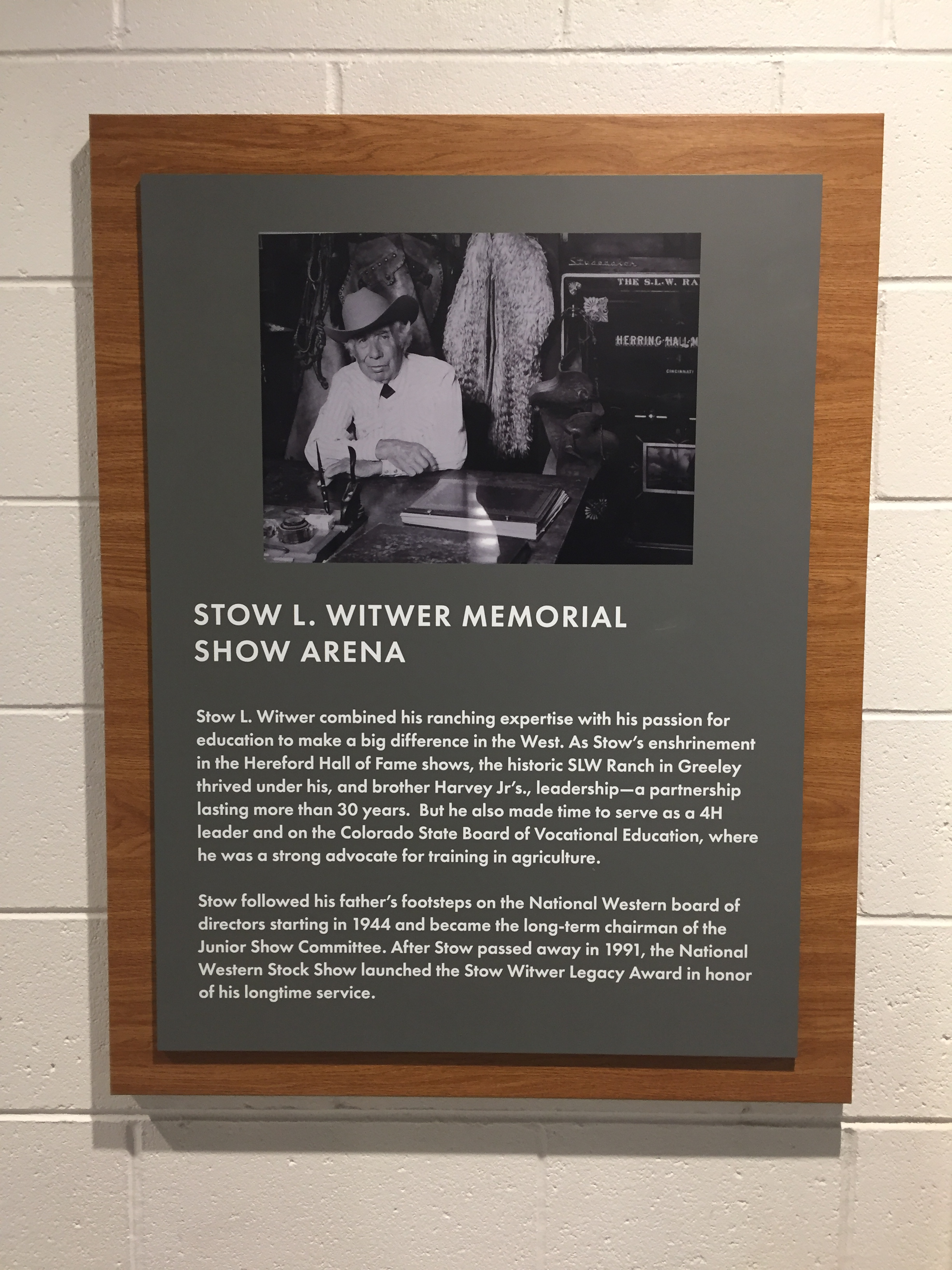
Plaque honoring Stow Witwer Sr at National Western Stock Show

In 2024 the ranch celebrated 125 years of continuous operation with the fifth generation actively involved with management and oversight of the property.

== See also ==
- National Register of Historic Places listings in Weld County, Colorado
- The SLW Ranch website
