= Amanda K. Alger Memorial Methodist Episcopal Church =

Historic church in Colorado, United States

- Alger, Amanda K., Memorial Methodist Episcopal Church
- U.S. National Register of Historic Places
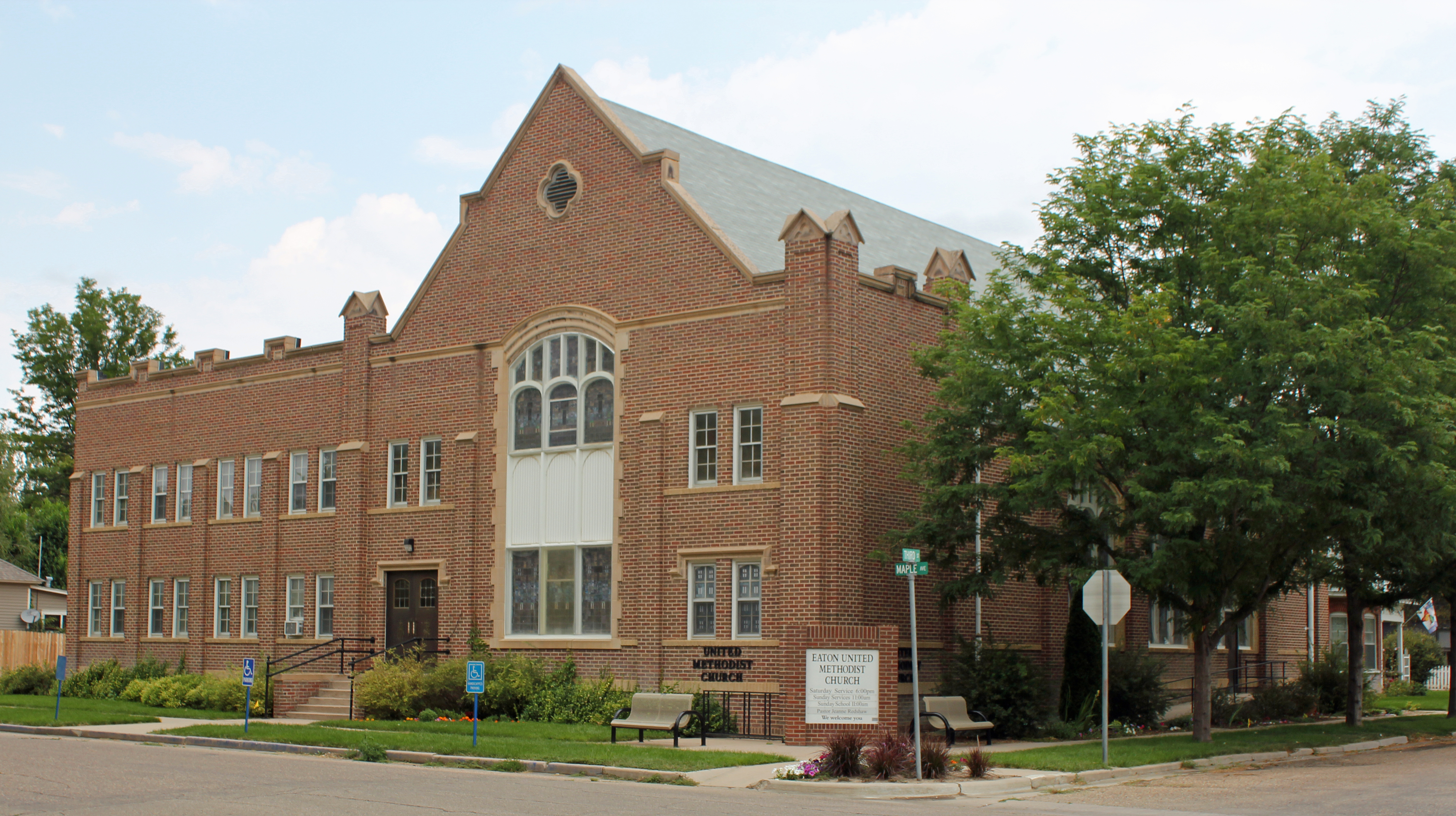

- Location within Colorado Location within the United States
- Location: 303 Maple Ave., Eaton, Colorado
- Coordinates: 40°31′45″N 104°42′49″W
- Area: less than one acre
- Built: 1925
- Architect: Wilson & Wilson; Young, C.H. & Sons
- Architectural style: Late Gothic Revival
- NRHP reference No.: 06000949
- Added to NRHP: October 25, 2006

The Amanda K. Alger Memorial Methodist Episcopal Church is a historic church at 303 Maple Avenue in Eaton, Colorado. It was built in 1925 and was added to the National Register in 2006.

It was deemed significant

as an excellent example of the Late Gothic Revival style. The church exhibits many of the characteristic elements of this early twentieth century style including the steeply pitched roof, arched windows with tracery, vaulted ceilings, quatrefoil elements, crenellated parapet, and simpler detailing. The church has undergone almost no alterations since its construction in 1925. Fine craftsmanship is evident in the detail found in the stained glass windows and woodwork throughout the building. All have remained intact over the past eighty years. The building retains integrity of design, materials, workmanship, feeling, association, and location. The picturesque effect associated with the Late Gothic Revival style is evident in the materials used and the craftsmanship exhibited. Late Gothic Revival is much simpler and typically larger in scale and more substantial than earlier Gothic Revival style buildings. The use of ornament on the church is present but restrained, indicating a more serene, modern sensibility. Many Late Gothic Revival buildings use brick or smooth stone on exterior wall surfaces highlighted by large lancet windows with stone tracery. The Amanda K. Alger Memorial Methodist Episcopal Church exhibits many of the elements attributed to the Late Gothic Revival style (Gordon 1992).

The listing includes a c.1903-1907 parsonage.
