= Nettleton–Mead House =

Historic house in Colorado, United States

- U.S. National Register of Historic Places
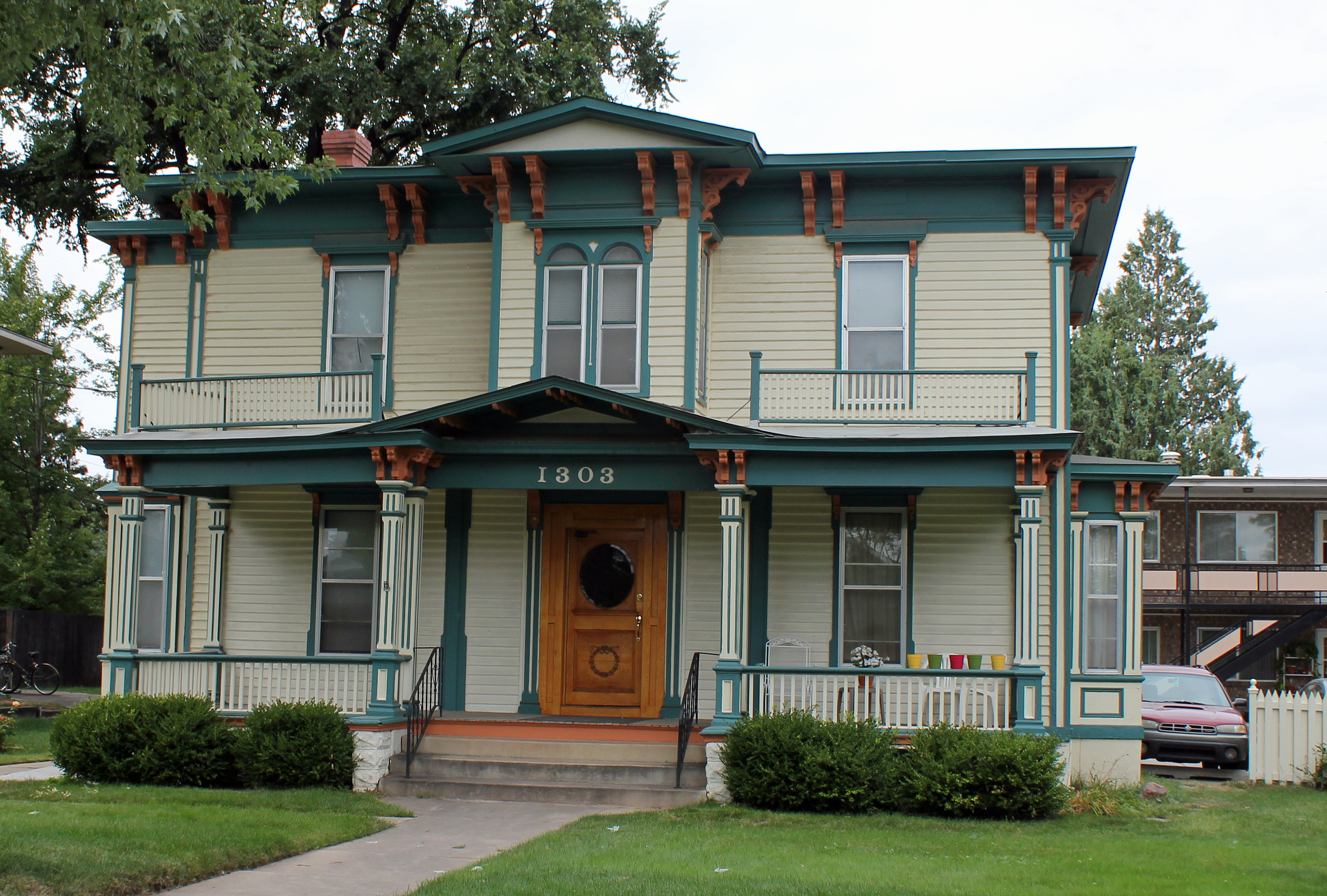
- The house in 2012

- Location within Colorado
- Location: 1303 9th Avenue, Greeley, Colorado
- Coordinates: 40°25′06″N 104°41′32″W
- Area: less than one acre
- Built: 1872
- Architectural style: Italianate
- NRHP reference No.: 02000290
- Added to NRHP: April 2, 2002

The Nettleton–Mead House is a historic house in Greeley, Colorado. It is listed on the National Register of Historic Places.

== History ==
The house was built in 1872 for Edwin S. Nettleton, a member of the Union Colony of Colorado who designed canals. When Nettleton died in 1901, the house was acquired by Alexander Mead. His daughter, Ella Mead, was a female physician who "established one of the first birth control clinics" in the United States in 1920.

== Architectural significance ==
The house was designed in the Italianate architectural style. It has been listed on the National Register of Historic Places since April 2, 2002.
