= Mead, Colorado =

Town in Colorado, United States

Town of Mead, Colorado
- Statutory Town
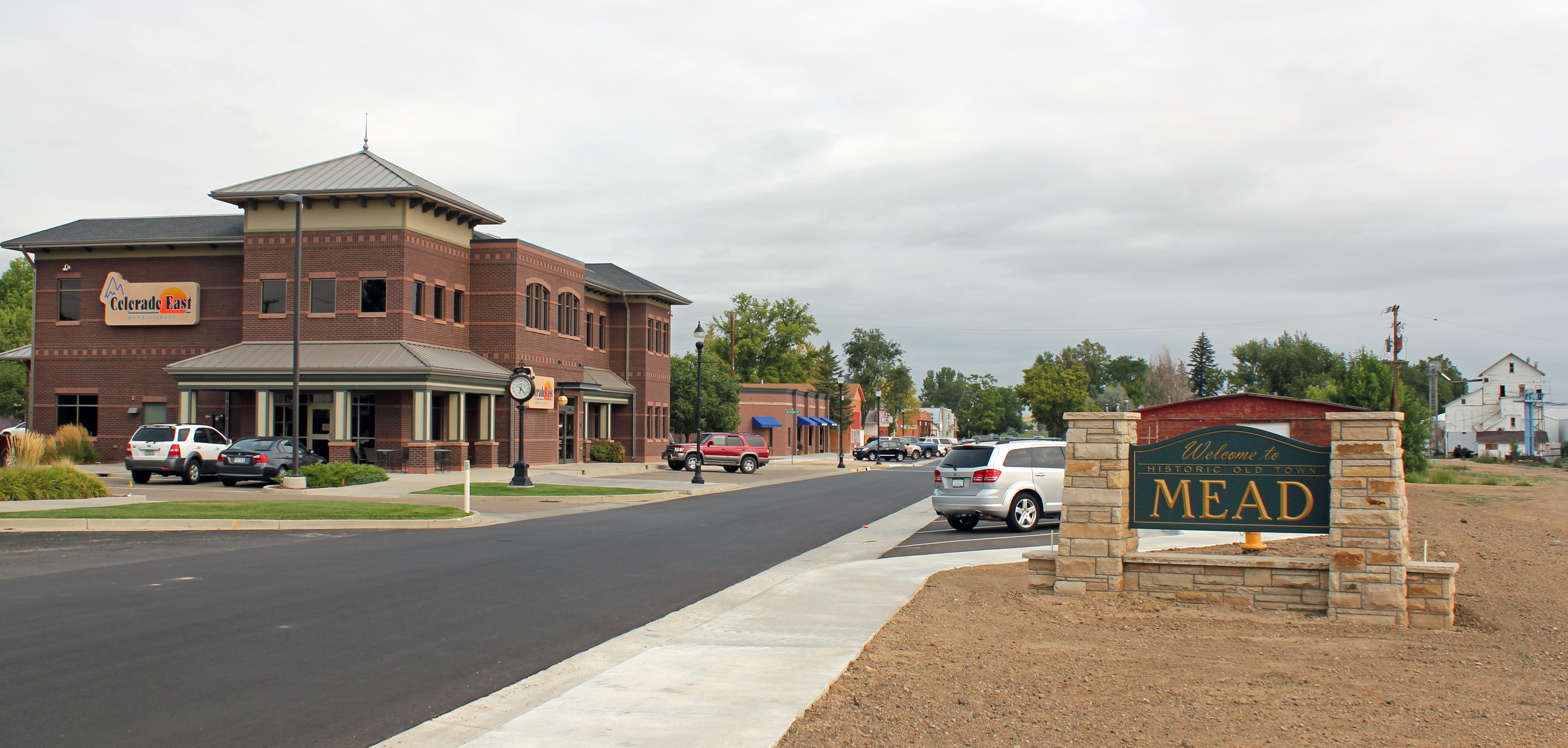
- Main Street in Mead.
- Motto: A little town with a big future
- Location of Mead in Weld County, Colorado.
- Coordinates: 40°15′14″N 104°58′58″W
- Country: United States
- State: Colorado
- County: Weld
- Platted: February 16, 1906
- Incorporated (town): March 17, 1908

Government
  - Type: Statutory Town

Area
  - Total: 12.73 sq mi (32.98 km^{2})
  - Land: 12.64 sq mi (32.75 km^{2})
  - Water: 0.089 sq mi (0.23 km^{2})
- Elevation: 5,017 ft (1,529 m)

Population (2020)
  - Total: 4,781
  - Density: 378.1/sq mi (146.0/km^{2})
- Time zone: UTC-7 (Mountain (MST))
  - Summer (DST): UTC-6 (MDT)
- ZIP code: 80542
- Area code: 970
- FIPS code: 08-49600
- GNIS feature ID: 2412970
- Website: www.meadco.gov

The Town of Mead is a Statutory Town in Weld County, Colorado, United States. The town population was 4,781 at the 2020 United States census.

== History ==
A post office called Mead has been in operation since 1907. The town was named after Dr. Martin S. Mead, a pioneer settler.

== Geography ==
Mead is located approximately 35 miles north of the State Capitol in Denver.

According to the United States Census Bureau, the town has a total area of 4.4 square miles (11 km^{2}), of which, 4.3 square miles (11 km^{2}) of it is land and 0.1 square miles (0.26 km^{2}) of it (2.71%) is water.

== Demographics ==
Historical population
Census	Pop.	Note	%±
1910	114		—
1920	145		27.2%
1930	152		4.8%
1940	191		25.7%
1950	186		−2.6%
1960	192		3.2%
1970	195		1.6%
1980	356		82.6%
1990	456		28.1%
2000	2,017		342.3%
2010	3,405		68.8%
2020	4,781		40.4%
2023 (est.)	6,450	▲	34.9%

=== 2020 census ===
As of the 2020 census, Mead had a population of 4,781. The median age was 39.1 years. 27.5% of residents were under the age of 18 and 12.4% of residents were 65 years of age or older. For every 100 females there were 102.8 males, and for every 100 females age 18 and over there were 102.9 males age 18 and over.

0.3% of residents lived in urban areas, while 99.7% lived in rural areas.

There were 1,562 households in Mead, of which 44.2% had children under the age of 18 living in them. Of all households, 72.6% were married-couple households, 11.9% were households with a male householder and no spouse or partner present, and 10.8% were households with a female householder and no spouse or partner present. About 11.6% of all households were made up of individuals and 5.3% had someone living alone who was 65 years of age or older.

There were 1,587 housing units, of which 1.6% were vacant. The homeowner vacancy rate was 0.4% and the rental vacancy rate was 4.4%.

Racial composition as of the 2020 census
Race	Number	Percent
White	4,016	84.0%
Black or African American	15	0.3%
American Indian and Alaska Native	35	0.7%
Asian	57	1.2%
Native Hawaiian and Other Pacific Islander	0	0.0%
Some other race	213	4.5%
Two or more races	445	9.3%
Hispanic or Latino (of any race)	626	13.1%

=== 2010 census ===
As of the 2010 census, there were 3,405 people, 1,215 housing units (1,164 occupied), and 573 families residing in the town. The population density was 468.2 inhabitants per square mile (180.8/km^{2}). There were 663 housing units at an average density of 153.9 per square mile (59.4/km^{2}). The racial makeup of the town was 95.69% White, 0.15% African American, 0.59% Native American, 0.50% Asian, 1.83% from other races, and 1.24% from two or more races. Hispanic or Latino of any race were 6.94% of the population.

There were 641 households, out of which 52.4% had children under the age of 18 living with them, 82.2% were married couples living together, 5.0% had a female householder with no husband present, and 10.5% were non-families. 7.5% of all households were made up of individuals, and 2.2% had someone living alone who was 65 years of age or older. The average household size was 3.15 and the average family size was 3.31.

In the town, the population was spread out, with 34.8% under the age of 18, 4.9% from 18 to 24, 35.7% from 25 to 44, 20.3% from 45 to 64, and 4.3% who were 65 years of age or older. The median age was 34 years. For every 100 females, there were 101.5 males. For every 100 females age 18 and over, there were 96.7 males.

The median income for a household in the town was $79,298, and the median income for a family was $81,433. Males had a median income of $55,455 versus $32,596 for females. The per capita income for the town was $31,483. About 0.7% of families and 2.0% of the population were below the poverty line, including 2.6% of those under age 18 and 5.2% of those age 65 or over.

== See also ==
- Denver-Aurora-Boulder, CO Combined Statistical Area
- Greeley, CO Metropolitan Statistical Area
