= Weld County Courthouse =

- U.S. National Register of Historic Places
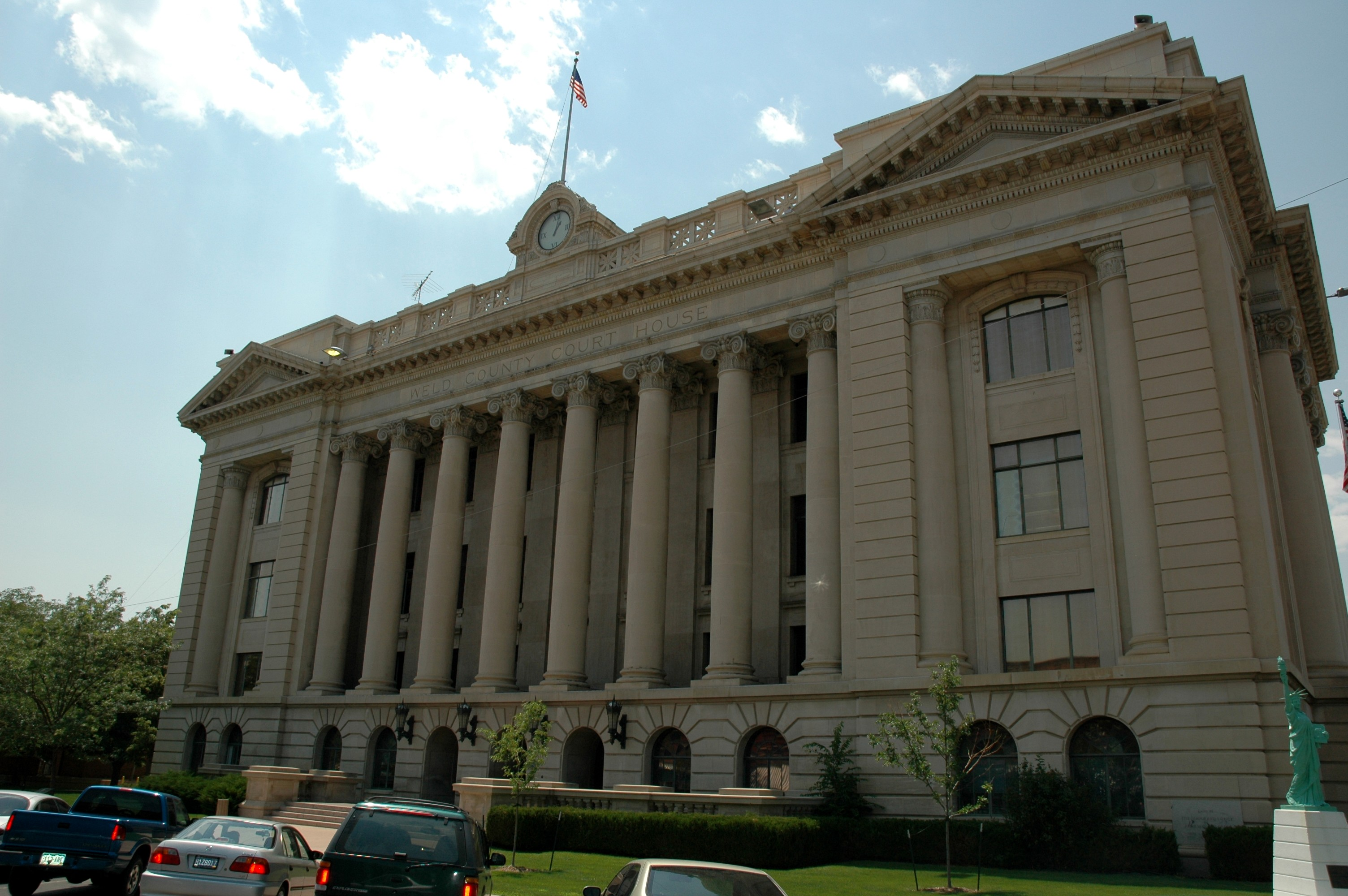
- Courthouse in 2006

- Location within Colorado
- Location: 9th St. and 9th Ave., Greeley, Colorado
- Coordinates: 40.42351°N 104.69319°W
- Area: less than one acre
- Built: 1917
- Architect: W.N. Bowman
- Architectural style: Classical Revival
- NRHP reference No.: 78000886
- Added to NRHP: January 9, 1978

The Weld County Courthouse, at 9th St. and 9th Ave. in Greeley, Colorado, is a Classical Revival-style building built in 1917. It was listed on the National Register of Historic Places in 1978.

It was built of Indiana limestone and marble and has a colossal portico of Ionic columns.

It was deemed "significant for its architectural style, which is unique in the Greeley area, and because it is both the center of and a visible focal point for county government." Its National Register nomination asserted "There is a great integrity and dignity in the total design. This, plus its careful detailing and lavish use of classical details and motifs, has combined to produce a county courthouse virtually unparalleled in most of Colorado's county seats."

The courthouse was designed by prolific architect William N. Bowman.

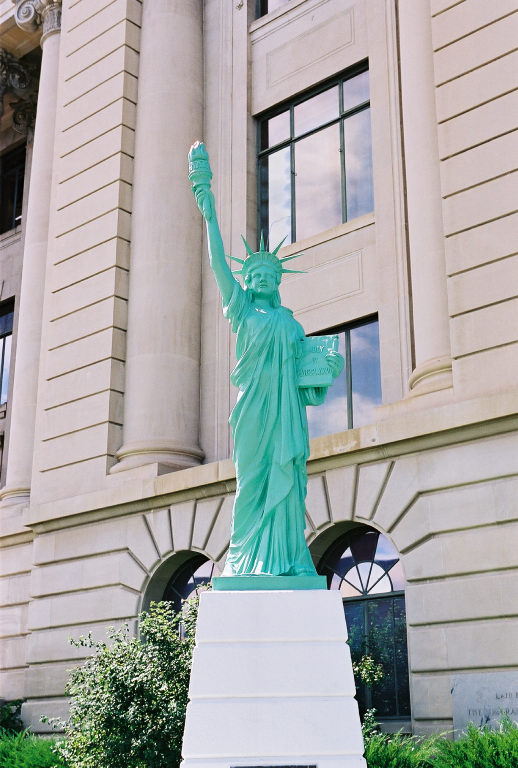
"Lady Liberty of Greeley"

The "Lady Liberty of Greeley" statue on the courthouse grounds was restored and re-installed in 2006.

When it was completed in 1917, Weld County shared judges with Larimer and Boulder counties. It is the sixth county courthouse building of the 19th Judicial Circuit. The first was a log cabin.
