= William N. Bowman =

American architect (1868–1944)

William N. Bowman (born 1868 in Carthage, New York, d. August 28, 1944 in Denver) was a prolific architect in Colorado.

He was born in 1868 in Carthage, New York. As the eldest of five children, he had to quit school at age 11 to work in a woolen mill, in order to support the family after his father was injured. Hoping to become an architect and builder, he studied math and drawing at night, at a schoolteacher's home. He first worked at an architect's office in Jackson, Michigan. Detroit architect Col. Elijah E. Myers recommended he do a carpenter's apprenticeship, which he did. He later worked for architects Mortimer L. Smith & Son in Detroit and Thurtle & Fleming in Indianapolis. And then was a member of Rush, Bowman & Rush, a construction firm.

In the main part of his career he worked as an architect in Denver and designed buildings statewide. He designed more than 30 buildings in Denver alone. He was president of Colorado's chapter of the American Institute of Architects during 1917–1919. He died in 1944 at his home in one of his works, the Norman Apartments in Denver, and was buried in Fairmount Cemetery.

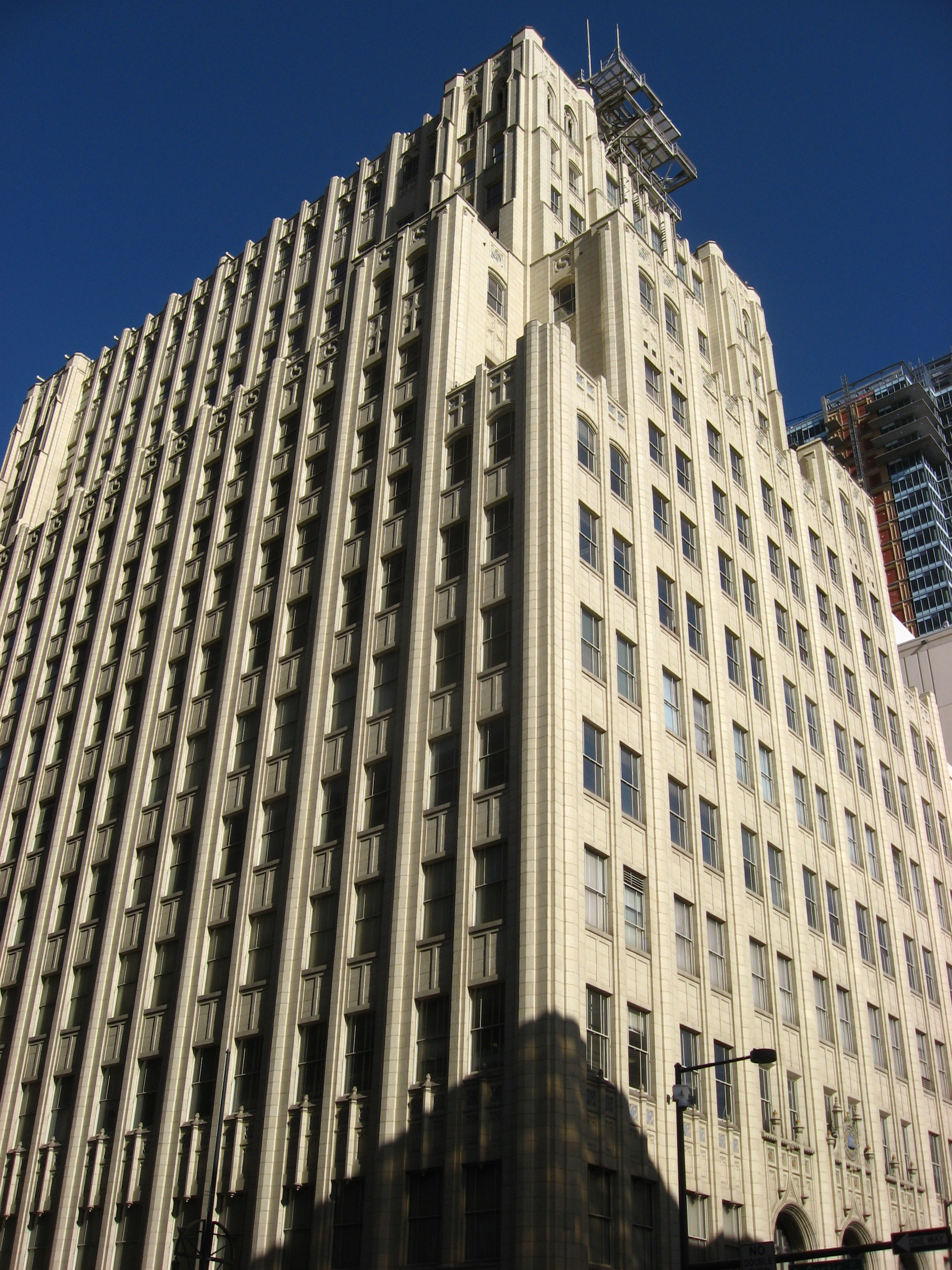
Mountain States Telephone Building, Denver

Notable works include (with attribution):

- Douglas City Hall (1915), 130 S. Third St., Douglas, WY (Bowman, W.N.), NRHP-listed
- Yavapai County Courthouse (1916), Courthouse Sq., Prescott, AZ (Bowman, William N.), NRHP-listed
- Weld County Courthouse (1917), 9th St. and 9th Ave., Greeley, CO (Bowman, W.N.), NRHP-listed
- Scotts Bluff County Courthouse (1920), 10th and Q Sts., Gering, NE (Bowman, William N.), NRHP-listed
- State Office Building (1921), NE corner of East Colfax and Sherman, Denver, neoclassical
- Fairplay Hotel (1922), 500 Main St., Fairplay, CO (Bowman, William N.), NRHP-listed
- Montrose County Courthouse (1923), 320 S. 1st St., Montrose, CO (William Bowman Company), NRHP-listed
- Colorado Building (1925), 401–411 N. Main St., Pueblo, CO (Bowman, William N., Co.), NRHP-listed
- McCook YMCA (1925), 424 Norris Ave., McCook, NE (Bowman, William N. Co.), NRHP-listed
- Greeley Masonic Temple (1927), 829 10th Ave., Greeley, CO (Bowman, William N.), NRHP-listed
- Mountain States Telephone Building (1929), 931 14th St. Denver, CO (Bowman, William N.), NRHP-listed
- Adams State Teachers College buildings, Alamosa, Colorado
- William Norman Bowman House-Yamecila, 325 King St., Denver, CO (Bowman, William Norman), NRHP-listed
- Byers and Cole Junior High Schools, Denver
- The Colburn Hotel, 980 Grant St., Denver, NRHP-listed
- Denver City and County Building, Denver
- El Jebel Shrine and the clubhouse, Denver (with T. Robert Wieger)
- Norman Apartments, 99 S. Downing St., Denver, CO (Bowman, William Norman), NRHP-listed
- Park Hill Methodist Church, Denver
- One or more works in Greeley Downtown historic district, roughly bounded by 8th St., 8th Ave., 10th St., and 9th Ave. Greeley, CO (Bowman, William N.), NRHP-listed
