= Thompson Valley High School =

Location
- 1669 Eagle Drive; Loveland, Colorado 80537; United States; 40°23′15″N 105°6′9″W

Information
- School type: Public high school
- Motto: Once an Eagle, Always an Eagle
- School district: Thompson R2-J
- CEEB code: 060952
- NCES School ID: 080540000938
- Principal: Jaymie Cruickshank
- Teaching staff: 55.98 (FTE)
- Grades: 9–12
- Enrollment: 1,033 (2023–2024)
- Student to teacher ratio: 18.45
- Colors: Black and gold
- Athletics conference: CHSAA
- Mascot: Eagle
- Website: tvhs.tsd.org

Thompson Valley High School (TVHS) is located at 1669 Eagle Drive in Loveland, Colorado. Its mascot is the golden eagle. It is one of five high schools in the Thompson R2-J School District, along with Loveland High School, Mountain View High School, Harold Ferguson High School, and Berthoud High School.

== Athletics ==
Thompson Valley hosts 24 varsity sports, as well as a club hockey team, and a water polo team, which have not been declared varsity sports.

=== Girls' swimming ===
In 2010 the Lady Eagles and Coach Changstrom won their first 4A state title on February 13, 2010 with 330 points.

=== Football ===
In 2015 the varsity football team was spotlighted in Michelle Lambert's music video Warrior.

== Notable alumni ==
- Lindsey Daugherty, attorney and member of the Colorado House of Representatives
- Kyle Howard, television and movie actor
