= Colorado's 51st House of Representatives district =

American legislative district

Colorado's 51st State House of Representatives district
Representative
Ron Weinberg; R–Loveland
- Registration: 30.3% Republican; 21.6% Democratic; 46.2% No party preference
- Demographics: 84% White; 0.8% Black; 12.9% Hispanic; 1.1% Asian; 0.1% Native American; 9.0% Multiracial
- Population (2020): 87,678
- Registered voters: 63,180

Colorado's 51st House of Representatives district is one of 65 districts in the Colorado House of Representatives. It has been represented by Republican Ron Weinberg since 2023.

== Members ==
- Ron Weinberg
- Jacki Marsh

== Geography ==
District 51 covers the home rule municipality of Loveland. The district is located entirely within Colorado's 2nd congressional district and the 15th Senate district.

== Recent election results ==
=== 2022 ===
2022 Colorado's 51st House of Representatives district Republican primary
Party	Candidate	Votes	%
Republican	Hugh McKean (incumbent)	7,741	55.97%
Republican	Austin Hein	6,089	44.03%
Total votes		13,830	100.00%

2022 Colorado's 51st House of Representatives district general election
Party	Candidate	Votes	%
Republican	Hugh McKean (incumbent)	26,542	100.00%
Total votes		26,542	100.00%
Republican hold			

=== 2020 ===
2020 Colorado's 51st House of Representatives district Republican primary
Party	Candidate	Votes	%
Republican	Hugh McKean (incumbent)	12,050	100.00%
Total votes		12,050	100.00%

2020 Colorado's 51st House of Representatives district general election
Party	Candidate	Votes	%
Republican	Hugh McKean (incumbent)	37,654	94.03%
Democratic	Vern Richardson (Note: Write-in candidate)	2,390	5.97%
Total votes		40,044	100.00%
Republican hold			

=== 2018 ===
2018 Colorado's 51st House of Representatives district Democratic primary
Party	Candidate	Votes	%
Democratic	Joan Shaffer	7,734	100.00%
Total votes		7,734	100.00%

2018 Colorado's 51st House of Representatives district Republican primary
Party	Candidate	Votes	%
Republican	Hugh McKean (incumbent)	8,954	100.00%
Total votes		8,954	100.00%

2018 Colorado's 51st House of Representatives district general election
Party	Candidate	Votes	%
Republican	Hugh McKean (incumbent)	24,745	56.16%
Democratic	Joan Shaffer	19,320	43.84%
Total votes		44,065	100.00%
Republican hold			

=== 2016 ===
2016 Colorado's 51st House of Representatives district Democratic primary
Party	Candidate	Votes	%
Democratic	Jody Shadduck-McNally	3,394	100.00%
Total votes		3,394	100.00%

2016 Colorado's 51st House of Representatives district Republican primary
Party	Candidate	Votes	%
Republican	Hugh McKean	4,082	51.97%
Republican	Tom J. Lucero	3,773	48.03%
Total votes		7,855	100.00%

2016 Colorado's 51st House of Representatives district general election
Party	Candidate	Votes	%
Republican	Hugh McKean	28,823	60.72%
Democratic	Jody Shadduck-McNally	18,642	39.28%
Total votes		47,465	100.00%
Republican hold			

=== 2014 ===
2014 Colorado's 51st House of Representatives district Republican primary
Party	Candidate	Votes	%
Republican	Brian DelGrosso (incumbent)	8,602	100.00%
Total votes		8,602	100.00%

2014 Colorado's 51st House of Representatives district general election
Party	Candidate	Votes	%
Republican	Brian DelGrosso (incumbent)	25,129	100.00%
Total votes		25,129	100.00%
Republican hold			

=== 2012 ===
2012 Colorado's 51st House of Representatives district Democratic primary
Party	Candidate	Votes	%
Democratic	Mark R. Shaffer	2,485	100.00%
Total votes		2,485	100.00%

2012 Colorado's 51st House of Representatives district Republican primary
Party	Candidate	Votes	%
Republican	Brian DelGrosso (incumbent)	5,508	100.00%
Total votes		5,508	100.00%

2012 Colorado's 51st House of Representatives district general election
Party	Candidate	Votes	%
Republican	Brian DelGrosso (incumbent)	23,760	54.18%
Democratic	Mark R. Shaffer	18,165	41.42%
Libertarian	Michael Renker	1,928	4.40%
Total votes		43,853	100.00%
Republican hold			

=== 2010 ===
2010 Colorado's 51st House of Representatives Democratic primary
Party	Candidate	Votes	%
Democratic	Bill McCreary	3,799	100.00%
Total votes		3,799	100.00%

2010 Colorado's 51st House of Representatives Republican primary
Party	Candidate	Votes	%
Republican	Brian DelGrosso (incumbent)	7,321	100.00%
Total votes		7,321	100.00%

2010 Colorado's 51st House of Representatives general election
Party	Candidate	Votes	%
Republican	Brian DelGrosso (incumbent)	19,000	58.13%
Democratic	Bill McCreary	13,688	41.87%
Total votes		32,688	100.00%
Republican hold			
