= Don Marostica =

American politician (born 1948)

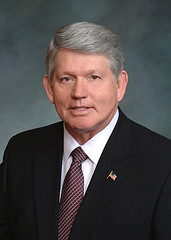

Member of the Colorado House of Representatives from the 51st district
- In office January 10, 2007 – July 23, 2009
- Preceded by: Jim Welker
- Succeeded by: Brian DelGrosso

Personal details
- Born: March 7, 1948 (age 78) Sterling, Colorado, U.S.
- Party: Republican
- Spouse: Carol

Don Marostica (born March 7, 1948) is a real estate developer and former legislator in the U.S. state of Colorado, currently serving as director of the state's Office of Economic Development and International Trade.

Raised in Colorado, Marostica is an Army veteran, former high school teacher, and most recently a prominent real estate developer in northern Colorado. After several years serving on the Loveland, Colorado city council, Marostica was elected to the Colorado House of Representatives in 2006, represented House District 51, which encompasses the city of Loveland.

Marostica, regarded as a moderate Republican, focused heavily on fiscal issues as a legislator, including transparency and loosening budgetary restrictions, and sat on the legislature's Joint Budget Committee during the 2009 session. In July 2009, Marostica resigned from the legislature to accept the post of economic development director in the cabinet of Democratic Gov. Bill Ritter, where he has focused on attracting and growing business in the state of Colorado during the ongoing recession.

== Early career ==
Marostica was born in Sterling, Colorado and graduated from Roosevelt High School in Johnstown. He attended Colorado State University on football and wrestling scholarships, graduating in 1970 with a degree in physical science and geology. In 1975, he earned a master's degree in secondary school administration from the University of Northern Colorado

Have been commissioned through the ROTC program at Colorado State, Marostica served in the United States Army and the Colorado Army National Guard, leaving the service at the rank of captain in 1979. After leaving the army, Marostica taught and coached wrestling at Rocky Mountain High School in Fort Collins. Marostica currently resides in Loveland, Colorado with his wife, Carol.

Marostica entered the real estate industry in 1977 and is currently a partner in Loveland Commercial, LLC. In 1982, during a downturn in the real estate market, Marostica declared bankruptcy and had judgements from creditors filed against him. He also had tax liens filed against him both in the early 1980s and in the mid-1990s, and has since paid all back taxes. Marostica became financially successful in real estate, and, together with other partners in Loveland Commercial, has donated extensively to local causes, including endowing a chair in the business department of Colorado State University. As a developer, Marostica specialized in commercial real estate, spearheading five Planned Unit Developments in Loveland and Milliken, Colorado.

Marostica was elected to the Loveland City Council in 2001, serving for three years, including a span as mayor pro tem, before resigning in 2004 because of professional conflicts of interest. During his 2006 legislative campaign, he was criticized for, as a city council member, voting to award city money to his company for a development contract; the city council had to authorize a special exception to its conflict of interest rules to approve the contract.

Marostica has served on over 60 boards and commissions in the Loveland area, with an emphasis on transportation-related issues (Loveland Transportation Finance Committee, Loveland East-West Mobility Study Committee, Loveland Eisenhower Boulevard Alignment Analysis Committee, Fort Collins-Loveland Airport Master Plan Update Committee). He has also served as the chair of the board of directors of the Poudre Valley Health System Foundation and the Medical Center of the Rockies Foundation, and on the bond oversight committee for the Thompson School District. He is also an avid motorcyclist and regularly participates in the Sturgis Motorcycle Rally and Ride to the Wall, a cross-county ride ending at the Vietnam Veterans Memorial.

== Legislative career ==
=== 2006 election ===
In seeking the 51st House district state house seat, representing Loveland, Marostica first faced a challenge from Kevan McNaught in the Republican primary. McNaught was endorsed by the Colorado Club for Growth, who criticized Marostica for his support of higher taxes and his use of eminent domain when he was a member the Loveland city council. Marostica edged out McNaught in the Republican primary by about 250 votes, or 5% of voters. In contrast with McNaught's conservative credentials, Marostica was considered by observers on both the left and the right to be a moderate Republican; he supported Colorado's 2005 Referendum C, a loosening of state spending restrictions under the state's Taxpayer Bill of Rights.

In the general election, Marostica defeated Democrat Jodi Radke in the general election with 56% of the vote. Marostica raised and spent roughly $350,000, of which $220,000 — almost least two-thirds of the money his campaign spent — was donated by Marostica himself, to win the contested primary and general elections.

=== 2007 legislative session ===
For the 2007 session of the Colorado General Assembly, Marostica was assigned to seats on the House Finance Committee and the House Transportation and Energy Committee, while expressing an interest in eventually serving on the powerful Joint Budget Committee. Following the legislative session, Marostica sat on the interim Transportation Legislation Review Committee.

Although a Republican serving in a legislature controlled by Democrats, Marostica was relatively successful at passing legislation. During his first session, Marostica sponsored bills to streamline the issuance of search warrants, to give volunteer reserve peace officers the same status as regular peace officers, and to require that powersports vehicles be sold only by licensed motor vehicle dealers. Marostica, an avid motorcyclist, was among the prominent opponents of a bill that would have required minors to wear motorcycle helmets while riding, even wearing his own motorcycle helmet to a committee hearing at which the bill was debated.

Marostica failed to win legislative approval what he described as his "most important" proposal — the "Taxpayer Transparency Act," which would have required that government expenditures larger than $300 be reported on a searchable government website. Although supported by Republican House leadership, the bill died in committee; however, Marostica saw his transparency proposal implemented in 2009 by an executive order of Gov. Bill Ritter.

=== 2008 legislative session ===
In the 2008 session of the Colorado General Assembly, Marostica sat on the House Health and Human Services Committee, the House Transportation and Energy Committee, and the Joint Capital Development Committee.

Marostica declared his "favorite bill" among those he sponsored during the session to be a measure to exempt owners from property tax on buildings leased to public universities, an idea Marostica attributed to a local developer. Marostica also sponsored legislation signed into law to allow statutory counties, cities, and towns to spend money on marketing in addition to advertising, in response to a lawsuit challenging the town of Estes Park's ability to engage in marketing.

=== 2008 election ===
Marostica announced his bid for re-election to the legislature in January 2008; Marostica's campaign raised about five times as much money as that of Democratic opponent Kenneth Bennett, bringing in over $80,000 by mid-October, of which $10,000 was contributed by Marostica personally; His re-election bid was endorsed by the Denver Post, Marostica ultimately won with 58 percent of the vote.

In the contested 2008 Republican presidential primaries, Marostica supported former New York City mayor Rudy Giuliani, helping to organize a November 2007 fundraiser for Giuliani's campaign that was reported to net over $60,000. After John McCain secured the Republican nomination, Marostica supported the McCain-Palin ticket, including kicking off a Sarah Palin rally in Loveland in October.

=== 2009 legislative session ===
For the 2009 legislative session, Marostica was named to a seat on the legislature's Joint Budget Committee, and a seat on the House Appropriations Committee as the ranking Republican member. During hearings before the beginning of the legislative session, Marostica supported withdrawing all state funding from public research universities, a move opposed by university leaders, but which was discussed more seriously after poor economic forecasts. Marostica also helped to lead an effort to allow the state to tap the financial reserves of Pinnacol Assurance, a quasi-governmental worker's compensation insurer, in order to balance the state budget. Following the legislative session, Marostica served on Colorado's Long-Term Fiscal Stability Commission, a panel created by legislation during the 2009 General Assembly to consider changes to constitutional constraints on the state budget.

In February, Marostica was the only Republican who announced plans to support legislation to repeal Colorado's Arveschoug-Bird limit, which capped the growth of general fund expenditures at 6 percent per year. Marostica faced pressure from prominent Republicans, including Independence Institute President Jon Caldara and former state treasurer Mark Hillman, to drop his support; in response, he referred to Hillman and Caldera as "has-beens" and "losers," earning him additional criticism from House Republicans; Marostica later promised to apologize to Hillman and Caldera. Marostica was the prime sponsor of the bill in the House, where, after surviving an attempted Republican filibuster in the Senate, it was ratified, and later signed into law. Marostica also broke with other Republicans as the only member of his party to vote in support of a failed effort to repeal Colorado's death penalty; the proposal passed the Colorado House by one vote, but was defeated in the Senate.

Marostica also sponsored bills to allow golf carts, scooters, and small electric vehicles to travel on some public roads, to allow state veterans organizations to provide burial for unclaimed remains of Colorado military personnel, and to allow building inspectors from other municipalities to assess structural damage to properties, a proposal stemming from a May 2008 tornado in Windsor, Colorado. to enable increased state funding for online education, and to keep Colorado's tobacco litigation settlement cash fund open for one additional year. Marostica announced plans to introduce legislation to expand the definition of cigar bars to increase the number of establishments exempt from Colorado's indoor smoking ban, but withdrew the legislation after facing opposition from Democrats; that same week, he denounced as "inappropriate and offensive" a British National Health Service flyer distributed by a lobbyist linking smoking to erectile dysfunction, calling for an ethics investigation into the flyer.

== Director of Economic Development ==
In July 2009, Democratic governor Bill Ritter named Marostica, a Republican, to the post of executive director of the Colorado Office of Economic Development and International Trade, replacing Don Elliman, who Ritter had tapped as Colorado's chief operating officer. Marostica resigned his House seat to take the position, and handed control of his development company to his partner and son in order to avoid conflicts of interest, Marostica named opening Asian markets to Colorado exports as a priority for his time in the new position, in addition to encouraging new venture capital investment and retaining existing major employers despite the late-2000s recession. Marostica was replaced in the House by small business owner Brian DelGrosso, and on the legislature's Joint Budget Committee by the more conservative Rep. Kent Lambert.

During Marostica's first months in the position, he helped lead Colorado's effort to keep Frontier Airlines jobs in Denver following its merger with Republic Airways; ultimately, Frontier moved several hundred jobs, and Frontier's headquarters, to Wisconsin and Indiana, which offered greater tax and economic incentives. When legislators proposed eliminating business tax credits in late 2009 to help balance the states budget, Marostica publicly defended many of those credits, but he did support limited cuts to tax credits in Governor Ritter's proposed 2010–2011 budget.

In late 2009, Marostica was also involved in attracting a wind turbine parts supplier to Colorado, announcing a renewed emphasis on natural gas development on Colorado's Western Slope, and pushing to speed the permitting process for oil and gas operations. In 2010, Marostica pushed for additional incentives for the "creative industry," including arts, media, and film, in Colorado.
