= Northern Colorado Economic Development Corporation =

- Abbreviation: NCEDC
- Formation: January 2001
- Dissolved: November 2015
- Type: Nonprofit corporation
- Registration no.: 501(c)(6)
- Purpose: Attracting and supporting primary employers
- Location: Larimer County, Colorado
- Board of directors: 23
- Formerly called: Fort Collins Economic Development Corporation and the Loveland Economic Development Council

The Northern Colorado Economic Development Corporation (NCEDC) served as a 501(c)(6) nonprofit corporation dedicated to attracting and supporting primary employers in Larimer County, Colorado. The not-for-profit corporation was dissolved in November of 2015. Over the course of its history, NCEDC was successful in attracting and serving a broad range of primary employers in Larimer County, Colorado. A primary employer is a company which derives 50 percent or more of its revenue from products or services sold and consumed outside of the county.

The company's mission was to "advance economic vitality through strategic job growth," by attracting businesses that offer highly skilled positions and creating a business environment conducive for innovation and entrepreneurism. This was accomplished by implementing an aggressive business prospect program, developing strong relationships with the existing Northern Colorado business community, and fostering the NCEDC brand.

== History ==
NCEDC was created in January 2001 by the union of the Fort Collins Economic Development Corporation and the Loveland Economic Development Council.

The Board of Directors has 13 voting members and 10 ex officio members. The voting members represent a variety of industries in Larimer and Weld Counties. The ex officio represent the communities of Larimer County and the county government itself.

On October 10, 2011, Walter J. Elish began his position as president and CEO of NCEDC.

In 2015, NCEDC ceased operations after facing internal challenges and increased competition from the newly formed Northern Colorado Economic Alliance, according to the Fort Collins Coloradan newspaper.

== Municipalities ==
NCEDC served eight municipalities in Larimer County: Berthoud, Estes Park, Fort Collins, Johnstown, Loveland, Timnath, Wellington, and Windsor.

== Partners ==
NCEDC partnered with the local communities, Larimer County, the Colorado Office of Economic Development and International Trade, Upstate Colorado Economic Development, Colorado State University, Rocky Mountain Innosphere, the Colorado Association for Manufacturing and Technology, the local industry clusters, and the local real estate community.
