= Welker =

Welker is a name originating from Germany, most commonly used as a surname. Welker has been used as a unisex given name, however this is less common than its use as a surname. Notable people with the name include:

== Surname ==
- David Welker (born 1964), American artist
- Frank Welker (born 1946), American actor and voice actor
- Hans Welker (1907–1968), German football player
- Heinrich Welker (1912–1981), German physicist
- Herman Welker (1906–1957), American politician
- Jim Welker (born 1950), American politician
- Kristen Welker (born 1976), American television journalist
- Martin Welker (1819–1902), American politician
- Michael Welker (born 1947), German theologian
- Ralph Welker (1911–1981), American politician
- Wes Welker, (born 1981), NFL player

== Given name ==
- Welker Cochran (1897–1960), American billiards player
- Welker Marçal de Almeida (born 1986), Brazilian footballer

== Fictional characters ==
- Jack Welker, a character from Breaking Bad
- Lois Welker, the maiden name of Lois from Malcolm in the Middle

== See also ==
- Welcker
- Walker (surname)
