= Harold Ferguson =

Harold Ferguson may refer to:

- Harold S. Ferguson (1851–1921), Scottish zoologist who worked in India
- Harold Ferguson High School, an alternative high school in Loveland, Colorado
- Harold Ferguson, character in Executive Action (film)

== See also ==
- Harry Ferguson (1884–1960), Irish engineer and inventor
