= Ron Weinberg =

American politician

Member of the Colorado House of Representatives from the 51st district
- Incumbent
- Assumed office January 9, 2023
- Preceded by: Amy Parks
- Succeeded by: Jacki Marsh (elect)

Personal details
- Born: Westville, South Africa
- Party: Republican
- Profession: Business owner
- Website: weinbergforcolorado.com

Ron Weinberg is a state representative from Loveland, Colorado. A Republican, Weinberg represents District 51 of the Colorado House of Representatives, which includes a portion of Larimer County, Colorado, including the city of Loveland.

== Background ==
Weinberg lives in Loveland and is the founder and owner of a business called 365 IT – Technology Solutions. Originally from South Africa, Weinberg immigrated to the United States along with his family in 2002. Prior to serving as a state representative, Weinberg was the chair of the Larimer County Republican Party and the chairman of the Loveland Planning Commission.

== Colorado House of Representatives ==
On October 30, days before the 2022 general election, Hugh McKean died. McKean had been running unopposed for reelection, and his death triggered a vacancy process to fill both the remainder of McKean's existing term and the new term beginning in 2023.

In July 2025, four women from Larimer County accused Weinberg of inappropriate conduct prior to his election in 2022, including allegations of bullying and unwanted sexual advances Weinberg denied the allegations, calling them "a politically motivated attempt to damage my name."

The Colorado Secretary of State filed a formal complaint against Weinberg on December 19, 2025, alleging that he used campaign funds for personal expenses between 2023 and 2025.

Separately, a House ethics complaint filed against Weinberg contained seven allegations. The House Ethics Committee dismissed four of the seven allegations and found probable cause on the remaining three. The committee recommended sexual-harassment training and a letter of admonishment.

The campaign finance case remains pending as of August 2026.

== Elections ==
Weinburg ran for election to the office in the 2024 elections. In the Republican primary election held June 25, 2024, he ran unopposed. In the general election held November 5, 2024, Weinburg defeated Democratic Party candidate Sarah McKeen, winning 52.62% of the votes.
