= Jackie Marsh =

Jackie Marsh may refer to:

- Jackie Marsh (Coronation Street), a character on the British soap opera Coronation Street
- Jackie Marsh (footballer) (born 1948), English former footballer

== See also ==
- Jacki Marsh, American politician
- Jack Marsh, Australian cricketer
