= Bimson =

Bimson is an English surname. Notable people with the surname include:

- Jennie Bimson (born 1976), English field hockey player
- Stuart Bimson (born 1969), English footballer

== See also ==
- Bimson Blacksmith Shop
- Bimpson
