= Loveland Chamber of Commerce =

The Loveland Chamber of Commerce is a membership-based non-profit organization founded in 1940. Consisting of more than 700 companies and 16,000 individuals, the Chamber serves as the driving force for promoting business and community prosperity in Loveland.

== Objectives ==
The Chamber provides programs and opportunities to educate investors about current business trends. It is responsible for the Old Fashioned Corn Roast Festival, one of Loveland’s largest community festivals, and the Loveland Valentine Re-mailing Program in addition to supporting day-to-day events in the Loveland community.

The Chamber focuses on four pillars to sustain and accelerate businesses: advocacy, connections, visibility and education.

== Advocacy ==
The Loveland Chamber advocates at the local, state, regional and federal levels on policy impacting northern Colorado. This mission is accomplished through committee involvement in legislative affairs, by providing resources for investors to contact government officials and participate in public hearings and its involvement in the Northern Colorado Legislative Alliance.

The Chamber was a founding member of the Northern Colorado Legislative Alliance (NCLA): a joint public policy organization developed in conjunction with the Fort Collins and Greeley Chambers of Commerce, and the Northern Colorado Economic Development Corporation (NCEDC).

The Local Legislative Affairs Committee is a Chamber-appointed and board of directors endorsed committee. Its mission is to favorably influence the actions of local governments for the enhancement of a positive business environment. This group identifies potential issues impacting the business community and evaluates these issues before recommending appropriate action to the Loveland Chamber and its board of directors. The Local Legislative Affairs Committee also serves as a liaison between investors in the Chamber and the Northern Colorado Legislative Alliance.

The Chamber provides resources for investors to contact legislators and find out information on issues including how to effectively write a letter to editors of newspapers and congressmen and how to testify on issues during a city council or county commission hearing.

== Visibility ==
The Loveland Chamber provides some promotional services for investors to increase their visibility in the community. After joining the Chamber, investors are thrown a ribbon cutting ceremony to welcome them to the Chamber. The photos and video from the ceremony are posted on the Chamber’s social media pages and on the website. The Loveland Chamber also provides traditional methods of promotion for its investors including a member directory with the opportunity to post pictures, video and links. Investors may also write blogs and sponsor events and programs. The Chamber recognizes a Featured Monthly Investor through the website and its social media channels.

== Education ==
The Loveland Chamber provides opportunities for members to develop their business skills and learn current business trends by attending educational events and programs.

=== Leadership Loveland ===
The program offers one-day seminars every month focused on topics such as: business and the economy, state government, public safety/natural resources and media. Leadership Loveland is sponsored by McKee Medical Center in Loveland, Colo.

=== Social media ===
The Loveland Chamber uses social media as a means for reaching out to investors for networking and educational purposes. The Loveland Chamber actively uses Facebook, Twitter and LinkedIn to start conversations and inform investors about events, business trends, legislative affairs and community news.

== Involvement in the Community ==
=== Old Fashioned Corn Roast Festival ===
The Old Fashioned Corn Roast Festival is one of the largest and oldest community festivals in Loveland. It is a family event celebrating the end of summer typically held at the end of August. The two-day event includes a parade, live music, corn shucking contest, recipe contests, corn eating contest, vendors, activities hot, fresh corn and more. All events are sponsored by businesses in the Loveland community.

=== Valentine’s Day ===
Due to its name, Loveland, Colorado is very involved in Valentine’s Day related activities. The Loveland Chamber runs several of these programs and helps others promote theirs.

The most famous Valentine’s program from Loveland is the Loveland Valentine Re-mailing Program. This is an annual program held by the Loveland Chamber of Commerce and the Loveland Post Office. People from around the world can mail valentines to the Loveland Postmaster to be stamped with a unique cachet and verse and a special postal cancellation, then mailed to their final destination. The program has been running for 70 years and each year there is a different cancellation, cachet and verse. All the valentines are stamped by volunteers from the community, mostly senior citizens. There is a waiting list of more than 50 individuals to fill stamping positions. Information on how to mail valentines is available on the Loveland Chamber’s website.

The Valentine Re-mailing Program inspired the Loveland Chamber to produce the, “official Loveland valentine card” each year. Each year the design on the card and the inside verse are created by local artists and residents. These cards are sold throughout northern Colorado in retail stores like Walmart, Safeway and Hallmark, and they are sold online.

Since 1962, the Loveland Chamber has selected a Miss Loveland Valentine. There are currently 50 Miss Loveland Valentine’s.

Thompson Valley Rotary Heart’s Program is not arranged by the Loveland Chamber of Commerce, but it is a long running tradition in Loveland. For more than 40 years, volunteers have decorated wooden hearts with words of affection and attached them to lamp posts and telephone poles lining the streets of Loveland.
