= Alec Hansen =

American baseball player

- Pitcher
- Born: October 10, 1994 (age 31); Loveland, Colorado
- Bats: Right Throws: Right
- Stats at Baseball Reference

Alec John Hansen (born October 10, 1994) is an American former professional baseball pitcher. He played college baseball at Oklahoma and professionally in the Chicago White Sox organization.

== Amateur career ==
Hansen attended Loveland High School in Loveland, Colorado. As a junior, he had a 4.44 earned run average (ERA) and as a senior he had a 0.91 ERA with 71 strikeouts. He was drafted by the Colorado Rockies in the 25th round of the 2013 Major League Baseball draft, but did not sign and attended the University of Oklahoma to play college baseball for the Oklahoma Sooners.

As a freshman at Oklahoma, Hansen appeared in 10 games with one start. He went 0–1 with a 4.76 ERA with 16 strikeouts and 11 walks in 11 1/3 innings. As a sophomore, he started 15 games, going 5–6 with a 3.95 ERA and 94 strikeouts in 82 innings.

== Professional career ==
The Chicago White Sox selected Hansen in the second round, with the 49th overall selection, of the 2016 MLB draft. He signed with the White Sox, receiving a $1,284,500 signing bonus. Hansen made his debut for the Arizona League White Sox and spent time with both the Great Falls Voyagers and Kannapolis Intimidators during the 2016 season, posting a combined 1.32 ERA with 81 strikeouts in 54 2/3 innings between the three clubs. He spent 2017 with Kannapolis, the Winston-Salem Dash, and the Birmingham Barons, going 11–8 with a 2.80 ERA with a 1.17 WHIP in 26 games started between all three teams. Hansen was unable to maintain his 2017 production the following season however, struggling to a 6.31 ERA in 14 starts between Winston-Salem and Birmingham.

In 2019, Hansen again spent the year with Winston-Salem and Birmingham, pitching to a 4.64 ERA with 66 strikeouts in 52.1 innings of work across 39 appearances. Hansen did not play in a game in 2020 due to the cancellation of the minor league season because of the COVID-19 pandemic. In 2021, returned to Double-A Birmingham, scuffling to a 6.04 ERA with 43 strikeouts in 22 contests. On January 12, 2022, Hansen retired from professional baseball.
