= Bimpson =

Bimpson is an English surname. Notable people with the surname include:

- Louis Bimpson (1929–2021), English footballer
- Francesca Bimpson (died 2008), English murder victim

== See also ==
- Bimson
- Simpson (name)
