= Ferguson High School =

Ferguson High School refers to several schools:

- Ferguson High School, Ratnapura
- Homer L. Ferguson High School, Virginia
- Harold Ferguson High School, Colorado
- John A. Ferguson High School, Florida
- Ferguson High School, operated from 1939–1962, Missouri. See McCluer High School.
