= Patrick Neville =

American politician

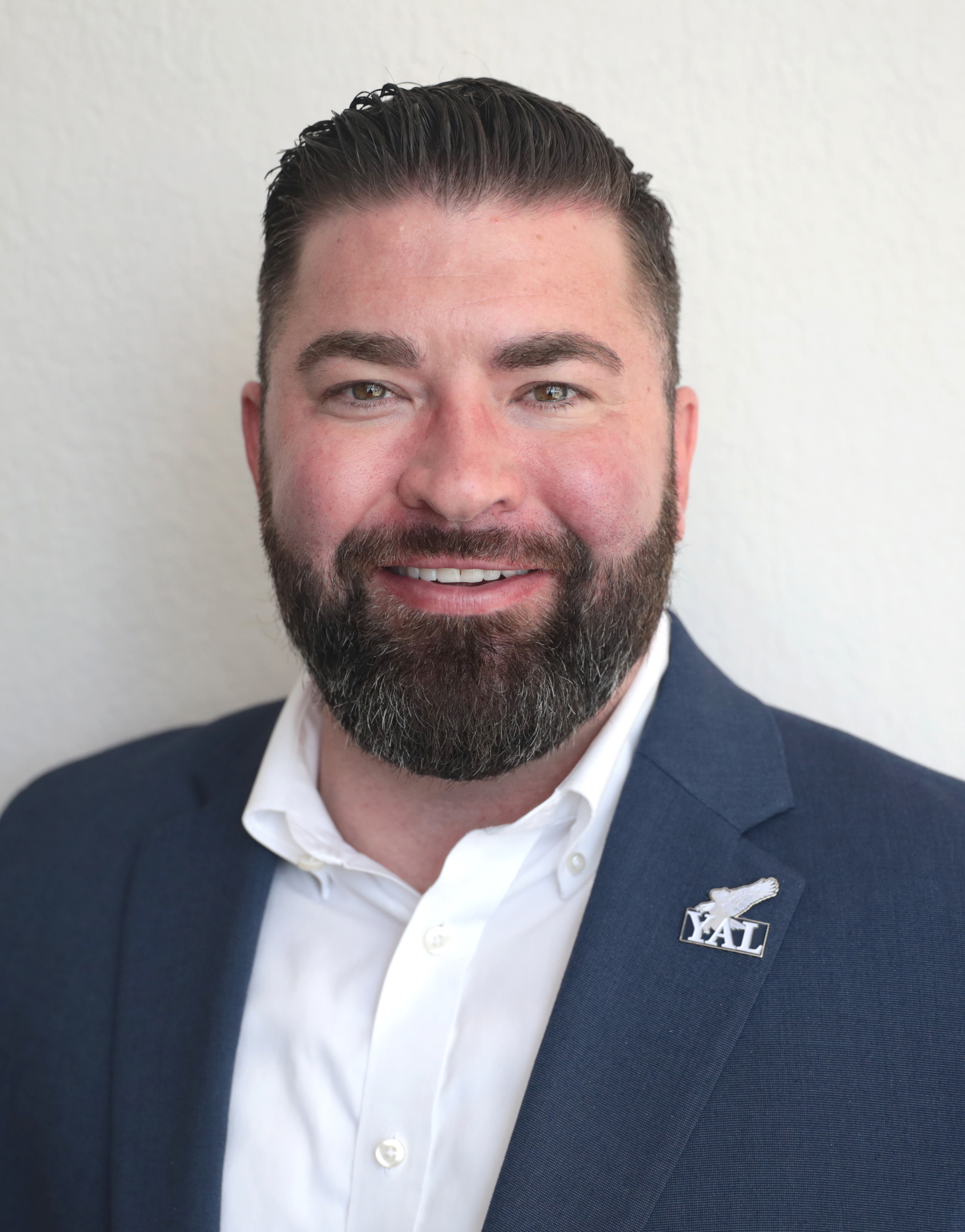

Minority Leader of the Colorado House of Representatives
- In office January 11, 2017 – January 13, 2021
- Preceded by: Brian DelGrosso
- Succeeded by: Hugh McKean

Member of the Colorado House of Representatives from the 45th district
- In office January 7, 2015 – January 9, 2023
- Preceded by: Carole Murray
- Succeeded by: Lisa Frizell

Personal details
- Born: 1983 (age 42–43) Littleton, Colorado, U.S.
- Party: Republican
- Relatives: Tim Neville (father)
- Education: University of Colorado, Denver (BA)
- Website: Campaign website

Patrick Neville (born 1983) is an American politician and a former member of the Colorado House of Representatives from the 45th District, which included much of Douglas County. A Republican, Neville served as the Minority Leader of the House, having been elected to this position at the beginning of his second term in January 2017, until being replaced before the 2021 session.

His father Tim Neville is a former Colorado State Senator.

== Education ==
Neville earned a BA in economics from the University of Colorado Denver. Neville went to Columbine High School, surviving its 1999 massacre.

== Political career ==
Neville was first elected to the State House in 2014, winning 69% of the vote. Running for reelection in 2016, he beat his Democratic challenger, winning 70% of the vote. He won reelection again in 2018 with 62% of the vote.

Neville has raised doubts about the 2020 presidential election results, once claiming that there may have been significant voter fraud sufficient to overturn the election in multiple states that Biden won. Although Neville acknowledged that he has seen no evidence of fraud, he has promoted other unsubstantiated allegations of election fraud.

In the aftermath of the 2020 presidential election, on December 7, 2020, Neville and 7 other Republicans requested to the Speaker of the House KC Becker that a committee be formed on "election integrity" to conduct an audit of the Dominion Voting Systems used in Colorado's 2020 elections in spite of no evidence of issues. The request was rejected, with Becker criticizing it as a promotion of "debunked conspiracy theories."

During the 2021 legislative session, Neville was the lead sponsor of an anti-abortion measure that would virtually ban abortion under any circumstances. The measure was defeated in the House. Early in the 2022 legislative session, Neville sponsored another bill that would have only allowed abortion under limited circumstances, making it otherwise a felony crime.

== Controversies ==
In 2016, Neville became the House minority leader and given control of the House Republican Caucus Fund, a fund meant to support Republicans in House elections. It was reported that Neville modified the fund by renaming it "Values First Colorado", registering the account to his brother, and hiring his brother's media company, Rearden Strategic. Since 2017, the fund and committees run by Neville's brother has given Rearden Strategic over $1 million from the funds. Corporations co-founded by Neville also received money from the fund.

In December 2020, Neville doxxed a Denver Post reporter who wrote an article detailing Neville's management of the House funds. Neville shared their home address and voter information on Facebook. Neville removed the address and responded by saying that the reporter's information was "a matter of public record".

Colorado House of Representatives
Preceded by Brian DelGrosso	Minority Leader of the Colorado House of Representatives; 2017–2021	Succeeded by Hugh McKean
