= Adrian Plass =

British author and speaker (born 1948)

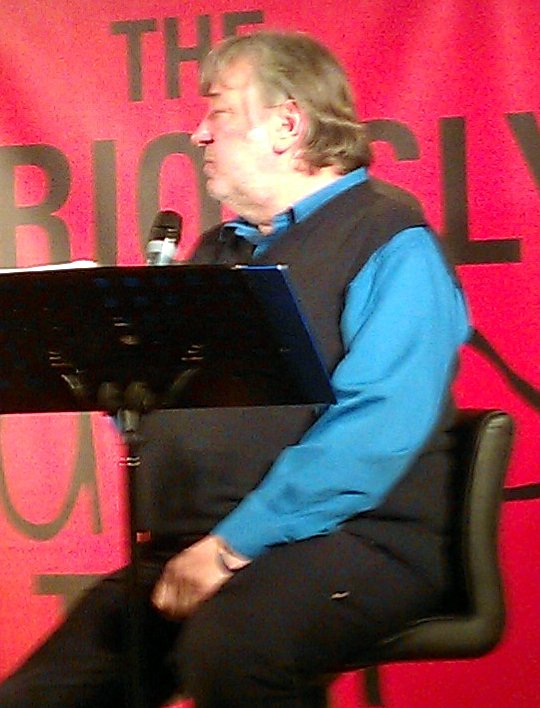
- Occupations: Author, speaker
- Spouse: Bridget
- Website: http://www.adrianplass.com/

Adrian Plass (born 1948) is a British author and speaker who writes primarily Christian humour, but also short stories, Bible commentaries and novels with a more serious tone. His most popular books are a series concerning The Sacred Diary of Adrian Plass which is a humorous, fictional satire of Christian life and which has sold over a million copies worldwide.

== Early life ==
Plass was born in Tunbridge Wells. He worked as a residential child care worker with disadvantaged children for several years before suffering a breakdown and then embarking on a career as a writer. The first thing he ever published was "The Visit", a novella in which a fictional local church in England is visited by Jesus (published in England originally as part of the short stories collection The Final Boundary, but as a standalone illustrated edition in 1999). The German translation of this novella, "Der Besuch", was made into a 40-minute film in 2006. He recorded some of his experiences as a youth worker in the fictionalised Broken Windows, Broken Lives.

Plass is an Anglican. Plass lived in Tunbridge Wells Kent and Hailsham East Sussex for most of his life before moving in 2010 with his wife Bridget to Yorkshire, England to live in the Scargill House community. In 2012 they moved to County Durham, where they now live.

== Career ==
Plass' most popular book The Sacred Diary of Adrian Plass Aged 37 3/4, the title of which parodies Sue Townsend's Adrian Mole books, is a humorous, fictional satire of Christian life. Plass followed this up with The Horizontal Epistles of Andromeda Veal in 1988 and The Theatrical Tapes of Leonard Thynn in 1989 to create the Sacred Diary Trilogy. He returned to the Sacred Diary proper with a sequel in 1996, called The Sacred Diary of Adrian Plass Christian Speaker Aged 45 3/4, in which as a prominent Christian speaker he tours Australia with his fictional wife Anne and son Gerald. A third in the series, The Sacred Diary of Adrian Plass, on Tour: Aged Far Too Much to Be Put on the Front Cover of a Book was published in 2004. By 2005 this series had sold over a million copies worldwide.

He travels around Britain and the world as a speaker. Some of his early talks and sketches are brought together in the books Cabbages for the King (1993) and Clearing Away the Rubbish (1988).

From 2001 to 2006, Plass teamed up with Focus on the Family Radio Theatre in their original miniseries Father Gilbert Mysteries to provide the voice of the lead character, Father Louis Gilbert, a former London police detective who became an Anglican priest and now solves spiritual mysteries in the fictional Sussex village of Stonebridge.

In 2006, Plass published his book Blind Spots in the Bible, in which he looks at forty passages in the Bible that have troubled him in the past. Reviewing this book, The Church Times said that he "treated the biblical text with kid gloves" so the investigation is personal application with "a great deal of autobiographical material (probably too much)", and concludes that "there is a great deal to mull over". The Church of England Newspaper says that "although it would be unrealistic to claim that Plass has solved all the mysteries, he does offer interesting theories which lead to one major conclusion", that is "a Caring God", and concludes there is "much to think about", although fundamentalist Christians may not agree with the author.

A final instalment to the Sacred Diary series, "Adrian Plass and the Church Weekend" was released in 2013. It was previewed from 11 to 22 March during his UK "Riding the Storm" tour organised by the Sailors' Society, one of his favourite charities.

His novel "Silver Birches" (published in 2009), was turned into a film directed by Randall Stevens, with screenplay by Mark Freiburger and starred Natasha Little, Anna Acton and Todd Carty.

== Bibliography ==
=== Sacred Diary series ===
- The Sacred Diary of Adrian Plass Aged 37 3/4 (1987)
- The Horizontal Epistles of Andromeda Veal (1988)
- The Theatrical Tapes of Leonard Thynn (1989)
- The Sacred Diary of Adrian Plass Christian Speaker Aged 45 3/4 (1994)
- The Sacred Diary of Adrian Plass, On Tour (2004)
- The Sacred Diary of Adrian Plass, Adrian Plass and the Church Weekend (March 2013)

=== Spin-off stationery ===
- The 1989 Sacred Diary: plan your year with Adrian Plass (includes extracts from The Sacred Diary of Adrian Plass Aged 37 3/4) Basingstoke, Hampshire 1988 ISBN 0-551-01742 2

=== Stress Family Robinson books ===
- Stress Family Robinson (1995)
- The Birthday Party (1999)

=== Other novels ===
- Broken Windows, Broken Lives (1988)
- An Alien at St.Wilfred's (1992)
- A Year at St. Yorick's (1998)
- Ghosts: The Story of a Reunion (2001)
- Silver Birches (2009)
- The Shadow Doctor (2017)
- Shadow Doctor: The Past Awaits (2019)

=== Collections ===
- The Final Boundary (1987)
- Clearing Away the Rubbish (1988)
- The Visit and Other Short Stories (1991)
- Father to the Man (1997)
- Nothing But the Truth (2002)
- And Jesus Will Be Born (2003)
- Best in Plass: Stories, Songs, Poems, and Sketches (2010)
- Silences and Nonsenses (poems) (2010)
- Still Crazy (2022)

=== Other works ===
- A Smile on the Face of God (1990)
- View From A Bouncy Castle (1991)
- Cabbages for the King (1993)
- The Unlocking (1993)
- You Say Tomato (1995) (with Paul McCusker)
- When You Walk (1997)
- City of Gold (1997)
- Words from the Cross (1997)
- The Visit: Would You Be Ready? (1999)
- Philip Illott (1999)
- Why I Follow Jesus (2000)
- Colours of Survival (2000) (with Bridget Plass)
- From Growing Up Pains to the Sacred Diary (2002)
- Never Mind the Reversing Ducks (2002)
- The Heart of the Family (2003)
- The Son of God is Dancing (2005) (with Bridget Plass)
- Jesus — Safe, Tender, Extreme (2006)
- Blind Spots in the Bible (2006)
- Bacon Sandwiches & Salvation (2007)
- Looking Good, Being Bad (2009)
- Growing Up Following Jesus (2009)
- Seriously Funny: Life, Love and God . . . Musings Between Two Good Friends (2010) (with Jeff Lucas)
- War of the Worlds (2012)
- Seriously Funny (2): Life, Love and God . . . Musings Between Two Good Friends (2012) (with Jeff Lucas)
- All Questions Great and Small (2016) (with Jeff Lucas)
