= Welcker =

Welcker is a German surname. Notable people with the surname include:

- Caius Welcker (1885–1939), a Dutch footballer
- Carl Theodor Welcker (1790–1869), German jurist and politician
- Carola Giedion-Welcker (1893–1979) German-Swiss art historian
- Friedrich Gottlieb Welcker (1784–1868), German philologist and archaeologist
- Gertrude Welcker (1896–1988), German silent film actress
- Hermann Welcker (1822–1897), German anatomist

== Other uses ==
- 13718 Welcker, main-belt asteroid
- Welcker volcano, the highest volcanic peak in the Garbuna Group
- Welker
