= Brian DelGrosso =

American politician

Minority Leader of the Colorado House of Representatives
- In office January 7, 2013 – January 11, 2017
- Preceded by: Mark Ferrandino
- Succeeded by: Patrick Neville

Member of the Colorado House of Representatives from the 51st district
- In office August 24, 2009 – January 11, 2017
- Preceded by: Don Marostica
- Succeeded by: Hugh McKean

Personal details
- Born: 1971 or 1972 (age 53–54)
- Party: Republican
- Spouse: Amber
- Profession: Small business owner, legislator

Brian DelGrosso (born 1971 or 1972) is a former state representative in the U.S. state of Colorado. Del Grosso, a small business owner, was originally appointed to office by a Republican Party vacancy committee in August 2009 to fill the vacancy created by Don Marostica's resignation. DelGrosso represented House District 51, which encompasses the city of Loveland. He was subsequently elected to the office in the 2010 election, and then re-elected in the 2012 and 2014 elections. Term limited, he did not seek re-election in 2016, and he left office in early January, 2017.

During his tenure in the house, he served as a term the minority leader.

== Biography ==
=== Early life, education, and career ===
Raised in Cheyenne, Wyoming, DelGrosso joined the Wyoming Air National Guard after graduating from high school; he attended the University of Wyoming and served as a legislative aide for one year while in college. As a college student, he worked for Domino's Pizza, where he eventually rose to management and became the operations director of 20 stores, and later owned three Domino's franchises, two in Loveland and one in Windsor, Colorado. DelGrosso moved to Colorado around 2005; he and his wife, Amber, have four children, Andara, Bransen, Breeley and Zackary.

== Legislative career ==
=== 2009 appointment ===
Gov. Bill Ritter tapped Rep. Don Marostica to serve as the state's director of economic development in 2009, opening up a vacancy in Marostica's house seat. DelGrosso was one of five who put themselves forward for the vacancy committee appointment, standing against local activist Tom Buchanan and former legislative candidate Kevan McNaught, who had lost the Republican primary to Marostica in 2006. After giving a speech at the vacancy committee meeting in August emphasizing his small business experience and his frustration with state government, DelGrosso tied with Buchanan on the first ballot, receiving 19 votes from the 54-member committee. On the second ballot, after McNaught and other candidates withdrew, DelGrosso received a majority of 29 votes.

=== 2010 legislative session ===
For his first legislative session, DelGrosso was named to seats on the House Finance Committee and the House State, Veterans, & Military Affairs Committee. In addition to vocally opposing the elimination of business tax credits, DelGrosso sponsored legislation to reduce the number of situations in which late vehicle registration fees are charged, to allow local governments to purchase workers compensation insurance for volunteers participating in property tax work-off programs, to allow alcoholic beverages to be served in luxury boxes of sports stadiums.

=== 2010 election ===
After his vacancy appointment, DelGrosso announced that he intended to seek election to a full term in 2010. He is expected to face Democrat and Loveland school board member Bill McCreary in the November 2010 general election.

=== 2012 election ===
In the 2012 General Election, Representative DelGrosso faced Democratic challenger Mark R. Shaffer. Delgrosso was reelected by a margin of 55% to 41% with the remainder of the vote going to third-party candidates.
