= Edward L. Berthoud =

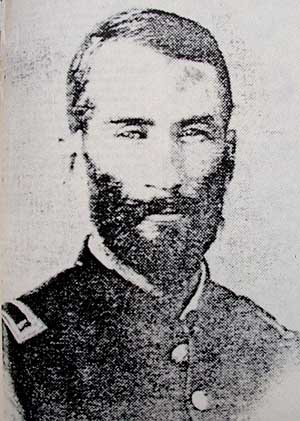
Edward L. Berthoud in a 19th-century photograph

Captain Edward Louis Berthoud (March 29,1828 – June 13, 1908) was a military officer, statesman and engineer in the western United States during the late 19th century. He is primarily known as the chief engineer and secretary of the Colorado Central Railroad during its expansion throughout Colorado in the 1870s. The town of Berthoud, Colorado, as well as Berthoud Pass in the Rocky Mountains west of Denver, are named for him.

== Biography ==
Berthoud was born Edouard Louis Berthoud (pronounced "bare-too") in Geneva, Switzerland on March 29, 1828. He came to the United States in 1830 with his parents and spent his childhood along the Mohawk River and in Oneida County in Upstate New York. In the United States, the family Americanized the pronunciation of their name to "ber-thud".

Berthoud graduated with a degree in engineering from Union College in 1849. In the early 1850s he worked as a surveyor on the Panama Canal. In 1855, he was living in Leavenworth in the Kansas Territory where he became interested in the effort to build the first transcontinental railroad. In 1860, during the Colorado Gold Rush, Berthoud and his wife Helen settled in the western part of the territory in the new town of Golden. Helen was a daughter of a founding Golden family, the Ferrells, and an original street of the town was named in her honor. In 1861, the town became part of the Colorado Territory. Berthoud spent much of his career surveying roads and railways throughout the region, and became an active citizen in Golden.

In 1861, in an effort to establish a more direct route from Denver to Salt Lake City, he surveyed the first road to Middle Park and discovered and surveyed the pass that now bears his name (current route of U.S. Highway 40). He also named Vasquez Peak. In 1862, after the outbreak of the American Civil War, he volunteered for the Union Army and received a commission in the 2nd Colorado Volunteer Infantry. That same year he received commendations for his design of fortifications to save Jefferson City, Missouri, during a rebel attack.

He returned to Golden in 1866 and proceeded to run for the Colorado Legislature. He also served as the librarian of the Colorado Territorial Library in Golden from 1867–1868. As a member of the legislature, he helped authorize the foundation of the Colorado School of Mines and served as the college's first registrar, and on its Board of Trustees. Berthoud surveyed the lines of the Colorado Central Railroad, the first railroad to penetrate the Colorado mountains, and he became the longtime proprietor of the Overland Hotel in downtown Golden. Berthoud served as the Colorado State Historian and was Mayor of Golden from 1890 to 1891.

Berthoud died in Golden in 1908 as a result of injuries sustained in a fall at the Overland, joining his wife who had preceded him in the 1880s. The Colorado School of Mines dedicated Berthoud Hall in his honor in 1940.

== Bibliography ==
- Michel et Brigitte Clément-Grandcourt, Edouard-Louis Berthoud, 1828–1908: De Fleurier à Golden (Colorado), Editions Attinger, Hauterive (NE), Switzerland, 2010. 135 pp.
- Robert C. Black, Railroad Pathfinder: The Life and Times of Edward L. Berthoud, Evergreen, Colo.: Cordillera Press, 1988.
