= Jacki Marsh =

American politician

Member-elect of the Colorado House of Representatives from the 51st district
- Assuming office January 2027
- Succeeding: Ron Weinberg

Personal details
- Party: Democratic
- Website: jackiforcolorado.net

Jacki Marsh is an American politician. A member of the Democratic Party, she is the member-elect for the 51st district of the Colorado House of Representatives. She was elected at the 2026 election. She is a former mayor of Loveland, Colorado.
