= Berthoud, Colorado =

Statutory town in Larimer and Weld counties, Colorado, United States

- Statutory town
- Town of Berthoud
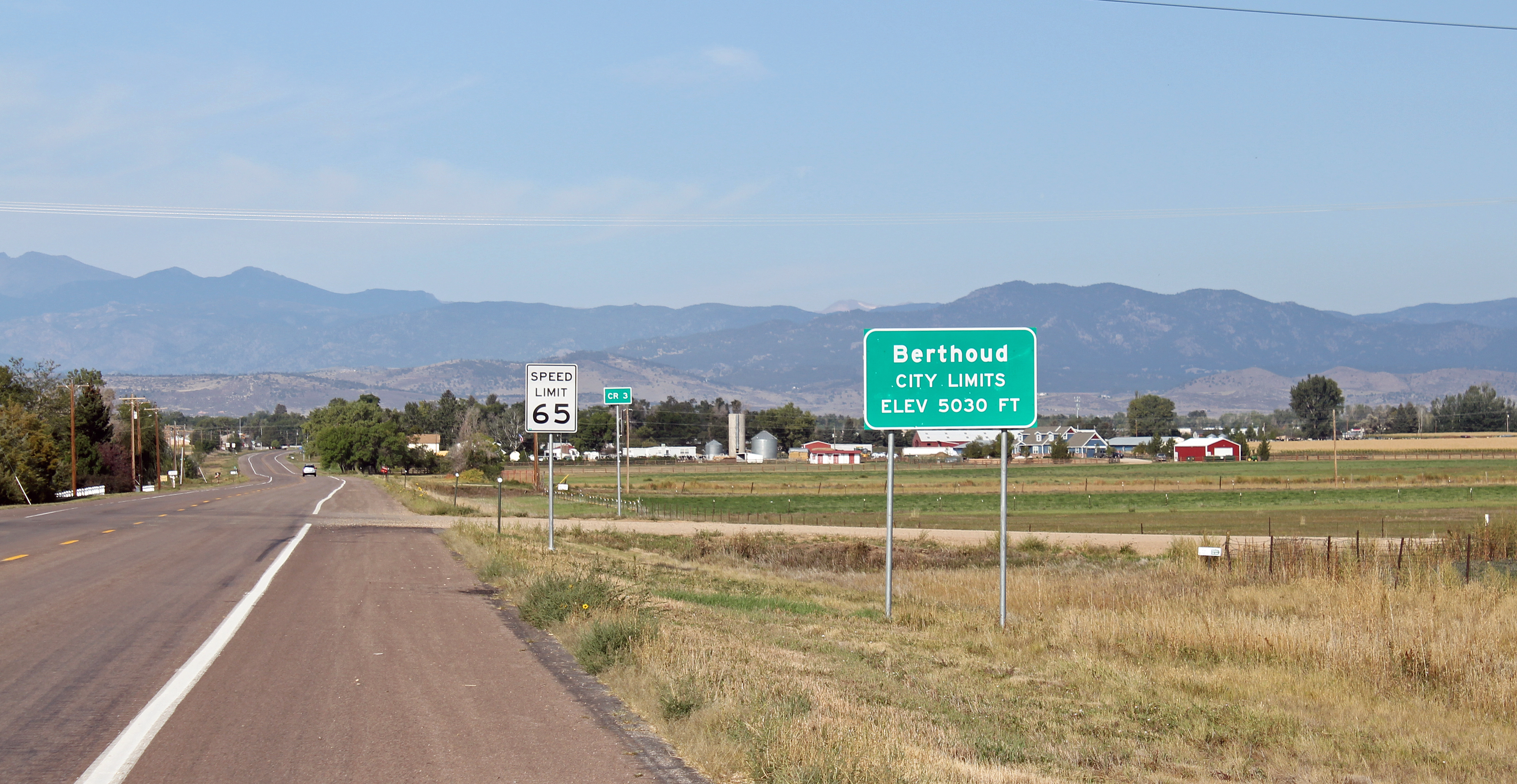
- Entering Berthoud from the east (2012)
- Nickname: The Garden Spot of Colorado
- Location within Larimer and Weld counties of Colorado.
- Coordinates: 40°18′44″N 105°03′40″W
- Country: United States
- State: Colorado
- Counties: Larimer and Weld
- Incorporated: August 28, 1888
- Named for: Edward L. Berthoud

Government
  - Type: Statutory town
  - Mayor: William Karspeck
  - Administrator: Chris Kirk

Area
  - Total: 13.067 sq mi (33.844 km^{2})
  - Land: 12.933 sq mi (33.497 km^{2})
  - Water: 0.134 sq mi (0.347 km^{2})
- Elevation: 5,033 ft (1,534 m)

Population (2020)
  - Total: 10,332
  - Estimate (2025): 14,080
  - Density: 799/sq mi (308/km^{2})
- Time zone: UTC−07:00 (MST)
  - Summer (DST): UTC−06:00 (MDT)
- ZIP Code: 80513
- Area code: 970
- GNIS town ID: 2411681
- FIPS code: 08-06255
- Website: berthoud.org

Berthoud is a statutory town located in Larimer and Weld counties, Colorado, United States. The town population was 10,332 at the 2020 United States census with 10,071 residing in Larimer County and 261 residing in Weld County.

== History ==
White settlers first came to the present-day Berthoud area in the early 1860s, following the Colorado Gold Rush. Many settlers filed homestead claims, but most bellied up and left the valley to heartier souls who ranched and farmed the arid prairie that straddled the river bottom.

In 1872, a miner-turned-rancher from Central City, Colorado, Lewis Cross, staked the first homestead claim where the Colorado Central Railroad planned to cross Little Thompson creek. When the tracks were laid through the valley in 1877 a depot, section house, and water tank were installed at this strategic site. The tiny settlement known as Little Thompson was renamed Berthoud in honor of Edward L. Berthoud, who had surveyed the rail route through the valley. The Berthoud, Colorado, post office opened on April 4, 1878.

Over the next few years the settlement grew to include a handful of homes, a blacksmith shop, a mercantile store, a small grain elevator, and a log cabin that served as school and church for the community.

In the early 1880s, the Colorado Central Railroad recognized that Berthoud's location on the river bottom caused their steam-powered locomotives to labor excessively to ascend the grade out of the valley. At their urging, during the winter of 1883–84, several buildings of the town were loaded on wheels and pulled by teams of draft animals to the town's present-day location on the bluff one mile (1.6 km) north of the river.

Agriculture in the Berthoud area flourished. Farmers diverted water from the Little and Big Thompson Rivers into a network of reservoirs and ditches that allowed the arid uplands to be irrigated. Harvests of alfalfa, sugar beets, wheat, corn, and barley were sold on the open market or used to fatten pens of sheep and cattle. The town grew as merchants and shopkeepers set up businesses to serve farmers and ranchers from the nearby countryside.

In 1886, the Welch Addition doubled the size of the Berthoud as town boundaries extended south beyond present-day Mountain Avenue for the first time. A year later a hose company was hastily formed to protect the town from fire after the Davis & Hartford Mercantile store burned to the ground. Berthoud was incorporated on August 28, 1888. A town board was elected and within a short time they hired a marshal to keep the peace and light the street lamps. By the early 1900s, Berthoud sported a business district on Third Street and Massachusetts and Mountain Avenues.

In the 1920s Mountain Avenue became part of a paved state highway system which would become U.S. Highway 287 connecting the larger towns of northern Colorado. In 2007, Highway 287 was rerouted to the north and west of Berthoud, bypassing downtown Berthoud and eliminating Mountain Avenue from the highway route.

In October 1941, Berthoud opened the sugar beet harvest. In the area surrounding Berthoud beets were harvested to be processed in Loveland, Colorado, to the north. According to the Berthoud historical society, "Berthoud growers delivered beets to several rural dumping stations where the beets were loaded into boxcars and hauled to sugar factories in nearby Loveland and Longmont." This industry relied both on WWII German Prisoners of War as well as migrant farm workers from Mexico.

On June 25, 2019, Berthoud became the only municipality in Colorado to ban the sale of puppy mill dogs.

== Geography and climate ==
Berthoud is situated north of the Little Thompson River, 21 miles (34 km) south of Fort Collins and 43 miles (69 km) north of Denver in the Front Range Urban Corridor. At the 2020 United States census, the town had a total area of 8,363 acres (33.844 km^{2}) including 86 acres (0.347 km^{2}) of water.

Berthoud has a cold semi-arid climate with relatively mild winters and hot, dry summers. Rainfall is fairly sparse, but the town does receive an average of 16 inches of precipitation annually. Average temperatures in the winter months range from the mid-30s to upper 40s Fahrenheit with lows occasionally dipping into the teens and single digits. During summer months, temperatures often exceed 90 degrees with an average high in the mid-80s Fahrenheit. The area receives an average of 229 sunny days per year. Berthoud averages 39 inches of snow per year.

== Demographics ==
Historical population
Census	Pop.	Note	%±
1890	228		—
1900	305		33.8%
1910	758		148.5%
1920	852		12.4%
1930	811		−4.8%
1940	811		0.0%
1950	867		6.9%
1960	1,014		17.0%
1970	1,446		42.6%
1980	2,362		63.3%
1990	2,990		26.6%
2000	4,839		61.8%
2010	5,105		5.5%
2020	10,332		102.4%
2025 (est.)	14,080		36.3%
U.S. Decennial Census

=== 2020 census ===
As of the 2020 census, Berthoud had a population of 10,332. The population density was 798.9 people per square mile. The median age was 37.8 years. 24.9% of residents were under the age of 18, 7.0% were under the age of 5, and 14.2% were 65 years of age or older. The town's sex distribution was 50.8% female and 49.2% male. For every 100 females there were 96.0 males, and for every 100 females age 18 and over there were 94.9 males.

93.7% of residents lived in urban areas, while 6.3% lived in rural areas.

There were 3,879 households in Berthoud, of which 36.1% had children under the age of 18 living in them. Of all households, 59.9% were married-couple households, 14.5% were households with a male householder and no spouse or partner present, and 20.0% were households with a female householder and no spouse or partner present. About 20.3% of all households were made up of individuals and 8.2% had someone living alone who was 65 years of age or older.

There were 4,185 housing units, of which 7.3% were vacant. The homeowner vacancy rate was 2.1% and the rental vacancy rate was 14.2%.

Racial composition as of the 2020 census
Race	Number	Percent
White	8,814	85.3%
Black or African American	39	0.4%
American Indian and Alaska Native	76	0.7%
Asian	117	1.1%
Native Hawaiian and Other Pacific Islander	12	0.1%
Some other race	328	3.2%
Two or more races	946	9.2%
Hispanic or Latino (of any race)	1,122	10.9%

=== Income and poverty ===
The median household income was $95,872, and the per capita income was $45,051. People under the poverty line made up 2.9% of the population.

=== 2010 census ===
According to the 2010 census, there were 5,105 people and 1,999 households residing in the town.

The population density was 446.7 people per square mile. The racial makeup of the town was 93.1% White, 0.2% African American, 0.9% Native American, 1.0% Asian, 0.2% Pacific Islander, and 2.1% from other races. Hispanic or Latino of any race were 8.6% of the population.

There were 1,999 households, out of which 34.6% had children under the age of 18 living with them, 52.9% were married couples living together, 9.6% had a female householder with no husband present, and 32.1% were non-families. 27.0% of all households were made up of individuals, and 8.8% had someone living alone who was 65 years of age or older. The average household size was 2.52 and the average family size was 3.07.

The town's population was spread out, with 25.4% under the age of 18, 7.2% from 18 to 24, 23.2% from 25 to 44, 31.9% from 45 to 64, and 12.3% who were 65 years of age or older. The median age was 41.2 years. For every 100 females, there were 101.0 males. For every 100 females age 18 and over, there were 96.7 males.

The median income for a household in the town was $70,292. Males had a median income of $43,676 versus $29,861 for females. The per capita income for the town was $28,111. About 4.4% of the population were below the poverty line.

== Arts and culture ==
Berthoud is surrounded largely by farmland, and is nicknamed the "Garden Spot of Colorado".

Annual events include:

- Berthoud Day
- Oktoberfest
- Arbor Day Celebration
- Berthoud Sunfest, featuring a quilt show and art market
- Berthoud Open Golf Tournament
- Berthoud Snowfest, featuring a sculpting competition

Museums include:

- Little Thompson Valley Pioneer Museum, featuring Bimson Blacksmith Shop, listed on the National Register of Historic Places.
- McCarty-Fickel Home, featuring a medical office from the 1930s.

== Parks and recreation ==
Berthoud has many parks, which include a skate park, baseball fields, soccer fields, outdoor basketball courts, sand volleyball courts, and pickleball courts. In 2023, the town authorized the construction of a bike and scooter park. Berthoud Recreation Center also contains an aquatic center. In 2025, the town completed a major renovation of the Berthoud Town Park including a 12,000-square-foot (1,100-square-meter) playground and a 6,000-square-foot (560-square-meter) natural stone water feature. The cost of the project was within the budget of $6.25 million.

== Government ==
Berthoud is a statutory town with a mayor-council form of government. The Board of Trustees includes all at-large elected positions serving for four-year terms and is made up of the mayor and six trustees. The board is charged with setting policy, passing the budget and creating the overall vision for the Berthoud.

The mayor has the same voting rights as all other trustees and is responsible for presiding over town board meetings. This position is recognized as the town government leader for all ceremonial purposes. The Board of Trustees elects, by majority vote, a mayor pro tem, who is expected to perform responsibilities of the mayor when the mayor is absent or unable to perform their duties.

The Board of Trustees meets regularly on the second and fourth Tuesday of each month and may schedule additional special meetings as needed. All meetings are open to the public and subject to Colorado Open Meeting Laws.

The current mayor is William Karspeck (term expires in April 2024), the current town administrator is Chris Kirk.

== Education ==
Students from the area attend the four public schools which are part of the Thompson School District: two elementary schools (Berthoud Elementary and Ivy Stockwell), a centrally located middle school (Turner Middle School), and a high school (Berthoud High School).

== Infrastructure ==
=== Police department ===
Berthoud contracts with the Larimer County Sheriff's Office for law enforcement services. The contract provides one sergeant and five deputies to provide patrol services for the town with support from all other divisions of the Sheriff's Office. Two deputies are assigned as school resource officers.

=== Transportation ===
Berthoud Area Transportation Service (BATS) is the main transit system in Berthoud and provides door-to-door service rides within Berthoud, as well as trips to Loveland and Longmont. BATS is open to the public and is operated through the town. The service receives funding from Berthoud, the Larimer County Office on Aging and the city of Fort Collins.

FLEX is a regional bus route that serves the communities of Fort Collins, Loveland, Berthoud, Longmont, and Boulder. This service is operated by Transfort and is made possible through regional partnerships.

== Notable people ==
- Clint Barmes - American former professional baseball second baseman and shortstop
- Tyler Carron - American ice sled hockey player
- Eric Conn - American biochemist
- Rennie Davis - American anti-war activist
- Nikko Landeros - American ice sled hockey player and skier

== See also ==
- Fort Collins, CO Metropolitan Statistical Area
- Greeley, CO Metropolitan Statistical Area
- Front Range Urban Corridor
