= Mountain View High School (Colorado) =

Location
- 3500 Mountain Lion Drive; Loveland, Colorado 80537; United States
- 40°24′15″N 105°1′30″W

Information
- School type: Public high school
- Motto: PRIDE – Be Present, Show Respect, Get Involved, Honor Diversity, Give Effort
- Established: 2000 (26 years ago)
- School district: Thompson R2-J
- CEEB code: 060951
- NCES School ID: 080540001786
- Principal: Markee Ramirez
- Teaching staff: 57.94 (on an FTE basis)
- Grades: 9–12
- Enrollment: 1,074 (2024–2025)
- Student to teacher ratio: 18.54
- Colors: Purple, black, silver
- Athletics conference: CHSAA
- Mascot: Mountain lion
- Website: mvhs.tsd.org

Mountain View High School is a secondary school in Loveland, Colorado, United States. Mountain View opened in 2000 and is the fourth public high school in the city, and the fifth high school in the Thompson R2-J School District. The principal of Mountain View is Jane Harmon as of the 2018-2019 school year.

Mountain View was chosen in 2007 as the district's Music and Arts magnet high school, which is called LISA (Loveland Integrated School of the Arts). This is the only high school in Loveland that holds this program. The school also houses the national pre-engineering program, called Project Lead the Way.

Students at Mountain View are permitted to rent iPads from the school due to a technology grant awarded by the Thompson School District.

== LISA (Loveland Area Integrated School of the Arts) ==
LISA opened in 2007 and is an arts magnet school at MVHS. It was developed to help students pursue the fields of visual and performing arts. All classes in the program have an emphasis on visual and performing arts. The program emphasizes critical thinking and problem solving through an arts-infused curriculum.

== Sports ==
MVHS boys sports include cross country, football, golf, soccer, tennis, basketball, wrestling, baseball, swimming, and track & field.

MVHS girls sports include cross country, softball, volleyball, basketball, swimming, golf, soccer, tennis, and track & field.

MVHS has won three state championships in baseball (in 2002, 2010, and 2013), multiple state cross country titles, and several conference championships for football.
