= Thompson School District =

School district in Colorado, United States

Address
- 800 South Taft Avenue Loveland, Colorado, 80537; United States
- Coordinates: 40°23′1″N 105°5′46″W

District information
- Type: Unified school district
- Motto: Empower to learn. Challenge to achieve. Inspire to excel.
- Grades: P–12
- Superintendent: Dr. Bret Heller
- School board: 7 member
- Chair of the board: Stu Boyd
- Schools: 32
- Budget: $237,963,000
- NCES District ID: 0805400

Students and staff
- Students: 14,907
- Teachers: 915.62 (on an FTE basis)
- Staff: 2,153.53 (on an FTE basis)
- Student–teacher ratio: 16.28

Other information
- Website: tsd.org

The Thompson School District is located in Loveland, Colorado and covers territory in Loveland, Berthoud, a southern section of Fort Collins and portions of Windsor, Johnstown and unincorporated parts of Larimer, Weld and Boulder counties. It is the 17th largest school district in Colorado, serving more than 15,000 students within 30 schools (16 elementary, 4 middle, 5 high, 3 PK-8 and 2 charter).

== Schools ==
=== High schools ===
- Berthoud High School
- Harold Ferguson High School
- Loveland High School
- Mountain View High School
- Thompson Valley High School

=== PK-8 Schools ===
- Riverview PK-8
- High Plains School
- Peakview Academy at Conrad Ball

=== Middle schools ===
- Bill Reed Middle School
- Lucile Erwin Middle School
- Turner Middle School
- Walt Clark Middle School

=== Elementary schools ===
- Berthoud Elementary School
- B. F. Kitchen Elementary School
- Big Thompson Elementary School
- Carrie Martin Elementary School
- Centennial Elementary School
- Cottonwood Plains Elementary School
- Coyote Ridge Elementary School
- Garfield Elementary School
- Ivy Stockwell Elementary School
- Laurene Edmondson Elementary School
- Lincoln Elementary School
- Namaqua Elementary School
- Ponderosa Elementary School
- Sarah Milner Elementary School
- Truscott Elementary School
- Winona Elementary School

=== Charter schools ===
- New Vision Charter School (K-8)
- Loveland Classical

== See also ==
- List of school districts in Colorado
