= Berthoud High School =

Location
- 850 Spartan Avenue; Berthoud, Colorado 80513; United States
- Coordinates: 40°17′56″N 105°5′11″W

Information
- School type: Public high school
- Established: 1921; 105 years ago
- School district: Thompson R2-J
- CEEB code: 060095
- NCES School ID: 080540000927
- Principal: Roy Tripi
- Teaching staff: 35.83 (on an FTE basis)
- Grades: 9–12
- Gender: Coeducational
- Enrollment: 698 (2023–24)
- Student to teacher ratio: 19.48
- Campus type: Subrban, Large
- Colors: Maroon and white
- Slogan: Our Business is Kids!
- Athletics conference: CHSAA
- Mascot: Spartan
- Feeder schools: Turner Middle School
- Website: bhs.tsd.org

Berthoud High School is a public high school in Berthoud, Colorado. In 2014 the school was ranked 30th in the state, 1,271st in the nation, and had an AP participation rate of 42%, according to U.S. News & World Report. For the 2014–2015 school year the student body makeup was 52% male and 49% female, and the total minority enrollment was 33 percent. Berthoud High School is 1 of 5 high schools in the Thompson School District R-2J and has the highest 4-year graduation rate in the district, with 91%.

The sports and extracurricular teams have a high success rate. In 2007 the football team won the state championship, and several of the members of the forensics team have gone to compete in the National Forensics League almost every year. Their Vex robotics teams, whilst not being directly part of the school, consistently rank high in the state, and have gone to the world competition several times.

== History ==
The town of Berthoud originally had a single school building, the Berthoud School, which served students in all grade levels. This building was built in 1897 in the present-day location of Fickel Park. In 1920, as the school became overcrowded, the citizens of Berthoud held a bond election to fund the construction of a new junior-senior high school. Students began attending the new Berthoud High School, which served students in the seventh through twelfth grades, in the 1921–22 school year. A new high school building was built later as it too became crowded, and the former high school campus now hosts Turner Middle School.
