= Murder of Francesca Bimpson =

2008 murder case in the United Kingdom

- Date: 2 December 2008
- Location: Everton, Liverpool
- Deaths: Francesca Bimpson

The murder of Francesca Bimpson occurred on 2 December 2008 in the Everton district of Liverpool. Shortly after midnight, the Bimpson family's home was set on fire in what investigators determined to be arson. Francesca's mother, father, brother, and two sisters were able to escape from the burning home, but three-year-old Francesca was trapped in a bedroom and later rescued by firefighters. She died in a hospital on 23 December.

Authorities later arrested Graham Heaps in conjunction with the arson, alleging that the arson was an act of retaliation against the family after Francesca's aunt ended a romantic relationship with him four to five months earlier. On 7 December 2009, Heaps was convicted of Francesca Bimpson's murder and sentenced to life imprisonment. He will be eligible for parole in 2037, after serving 28 years.
