= Jeff Lucas =

American writer and clergy

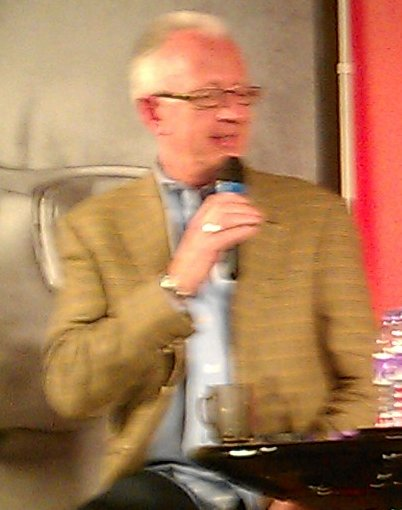
- Occupations: Author; Speaker
- Website: www.jefflucas.org

Jeff Lucas is a British Christian author, speaker and broadcaster.

== Career ==
Formerly a member of the Council of Management of the British Christian event Spring Harvest, Lucas has historically been linked to the Elim Pentecostal Churches, and also with the Pioneer Network, a Christian network established to "develop new churches across the UK and engage in mission globally". He was also the director of Equipped to Lead and is a former Vice President of the Evangelical Alliance. He has been a guest on Australia's Sunday Nights on ABC Radio, which noted Lucas "has had a strong impact in Evangelical, Pentecostal and Charismatic Christian circles internationally".

Lucas was a teaching pastor at Timberline Church in Fort Collins, Colorado, until his retirement in July 2024. He also broadcasts regularly on Premier Christian Radio. He contributes a monthly column for Premier Christianity magazine, the online men's magazine Sorted and writes daily Bible notes,'Life with Lucas'. He has served as a visiting contributor to Northwest University's MA leadership program, focusing on preaching/communication.

Lucas is an ambassador for the global charity Convoy of Hope, and coaches individuals and business and non-profits using the LifePlan and StratOps processes. He is also an advisor/consultant to a number of churches, including Kingsgate Community Church, and C3 Church, Cambridge.

As of late 2025, Lucas has written thirty two books.

== Personal life ==
Lucas is married to Kay. They have homes in Southern England and in Loveland, CO. He has two adult children.

== Publications ==
- Rediscovering The Father Heart Of God (Crossway Books 1997) ISBN 1-85684-127-8 (Previously published as Sweet and Sour Pork)
- Friends of God (with Cleland Thom) (Crossway Books 1999)
- Walking Backwards (Scripture Union Publishing 1997) ISBN 0-86201-973-7
- Elijah, anointed and stressed (Chariot Victor Publishing 1998) ISBN 1-56476-714-0 – later published as Going Public (Authentic)
- Lucas On Life (Authentic Media 2001) ISBN 1-86024-240-5
- Lucas On Life 2 (Authentic Media 2003) ISBN 1-86024-240-5
- How not to Pray (Authentic Media 2003) ISBN 1-85078-452-3
- Grace Choices (Authentic Media 2004) ISBN 1-932805-21-4
- Gideon: Power From Weakness (Authentic Media 2004) ISBN 1-85078-557-0
- Lucas Out Loud (Authentic Media 2005) ISBN 1-85078-630-5
- Will Your Prodigal Come Home (Zondervan 2007) ISBN 0-310-26725-0
- Creating the Prodigal Friendly Church (Zondervan 2009)
- Helen Sloane's Diary (Authentic Media 2008) ISBN 1-85078-797-2
- Lucas Unleashed (Authentic Media 2009) ISBN 1-85078-823-5
- I was just wandering (CWR)
- Life with Lucas 1 (CWR)
- Life with Lucas 2 (CWR)
- Life with Lucas 3 (CWR)
- Seriously Funny (Authentic Media 2010) (with Adrian Plass) ISBN 1-85078-869-3
- Up close and personal: what Helen did next (Authentic Media 2011)
- Seriously Funny 2 (with Adrian Plass (Authentic Media 2012)
- There Are No Strong People (CWR 2012)
- Faith in the Fog Zondervan
- 'Things My Grandchildren Taught Me' (CWR)
- The Cactus Stabbers (CWR 2014)
- There Are No Ordinary People
- All Questions Great and Small with Adrian Plass - Hodder
- It's a Dog's Life (CWR)
- If you want to walk on water, consider staying in the boat (CWR)
- Notorious (David C Cook)
- Specks and Planks (CWR 2020)
- Singing in Babylon - Finding Purpose in Life's Second Choices (David C Cook 2021)
- Life with Lucas,quarterly bible reading notes (Novio Publishing), published in the UK, USA, Australia and New Zealand and available digitally also.

Special products for New Christians and those interested in exploring the Christian faith, published by CWR:

- Travelling Light
- Life Every Day for New Christians
- Life - the Journey

Life Journey DVDs and booklets

- Walk on the wild side - Jonah
- Elijah
- Friends
- Stop Looking for the will of God
- Lent 1 The Impossible Dream
- Prodigals

Other booklets (published by Verite)

- Infinite Hope
- Light and soul of Christmas
- Y Christmas
- Bun, bunnies and bunk?

=== Contributions ===
- The Read of my Life (CWR)
- Preach the Word (Sovereign World)

=== Awards and nominations ===
- Christian Life Book of the Year 2014: The Cactus Stabbers (nominated)
- Eden Author of the Year 2018: (won)
- Christian Life Book of the Year UK 2018: It's a Dog's Life (won)
- Christian Life Book of the Year UK 2019: Staying in the Boat (nominated)
- Christian Life Book of the Year 2021: Singing in Babylon (won)
- Media Product of the Year (film): There are no strong people (won)
