= Hugh McKean =

American politician (1967–2022)

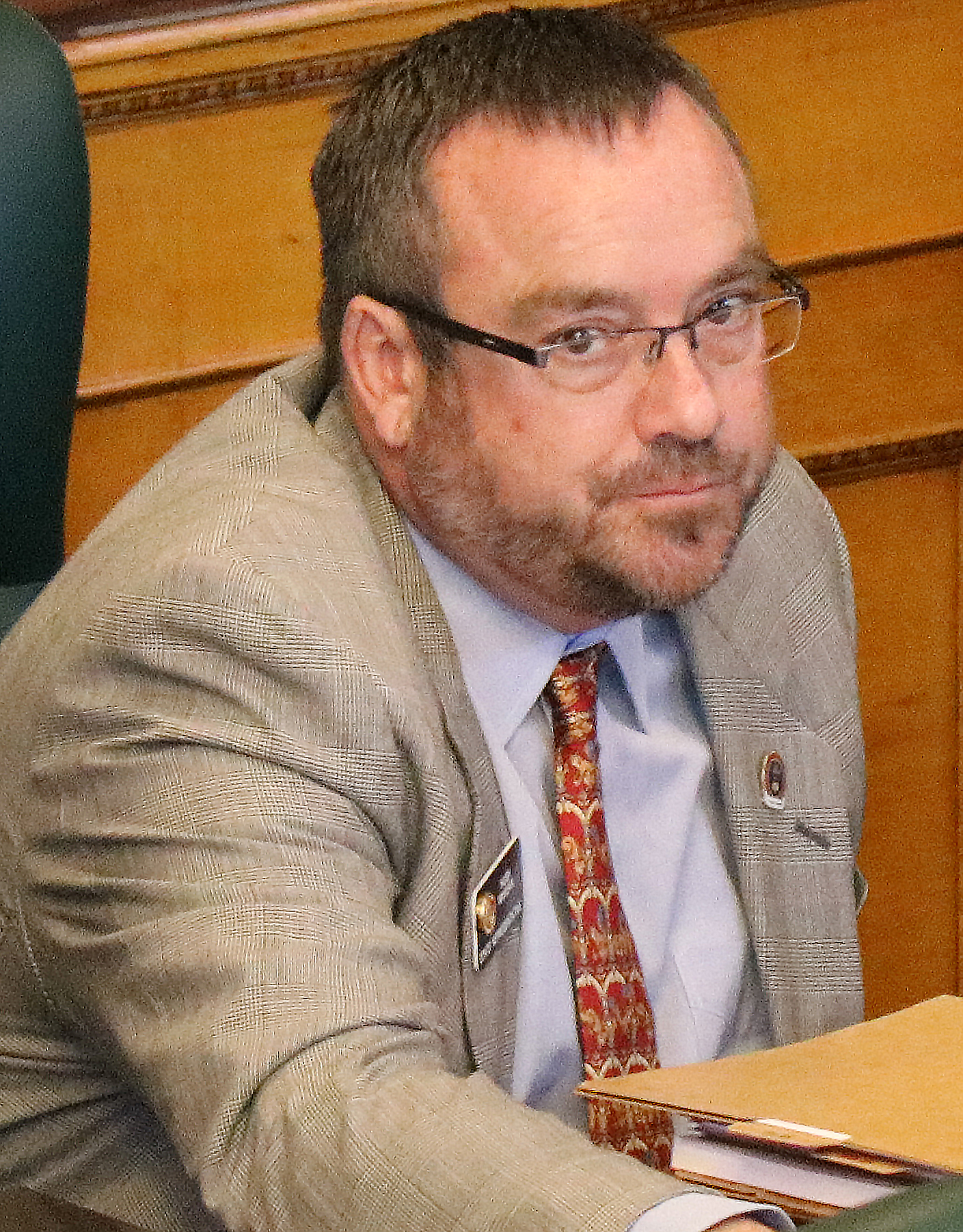

Minority Leader of the Colorado House of Representatives
- In office January 13, 2021 – October 30, 2022
- Preceded by: Patrick Neville
- Succeeded by: Rod Pelton

Member of the Colorado House of Representatives from the 51st district
- In office January 11, 2017 – October 30, 2022
- Preceded by: Brian DelGrosso
- Succeeded by: Amy Parks

Personal details
- Born: Hugh Monroe McKean; October 27, 1967 Philadelphia, Pennsylvania, U.S.
- Died: October 30, 2022 (aged 55) Loveland, Colorado, U.S.
- Party: Republican
- Children: 2

Hugh McKean (October 27, 1967 – October 30, 2022) was an American politician from Loveland, Colorado. A Republican, McKean represented Colorado House of Representatives District 51, which encompasses Loveland and the surrounding area. He was first elected in 2016.

Before his election as a state representative, McKean served as a city council member in Loveland.

McKean was elected house minority leader for the 73rd General Assembly and served from January 13, 2021, until his death in October 2022.

McKean died of a heart attack at his home on October 30, 2022, three days after his 55th birthday. At the time of his death, he was seeking a fourth term in the November 8, 2022, elections, and was unopposed on the ballot.

Colorado House of Representatives
Preceded by Patrick Neville	Minority Leader of the Colorado House of Representatives; 2021–2022	Succeeded by Rod Pelton
