= Bimson Blacksmith Shop =

- U.S. National Register of Historic Places
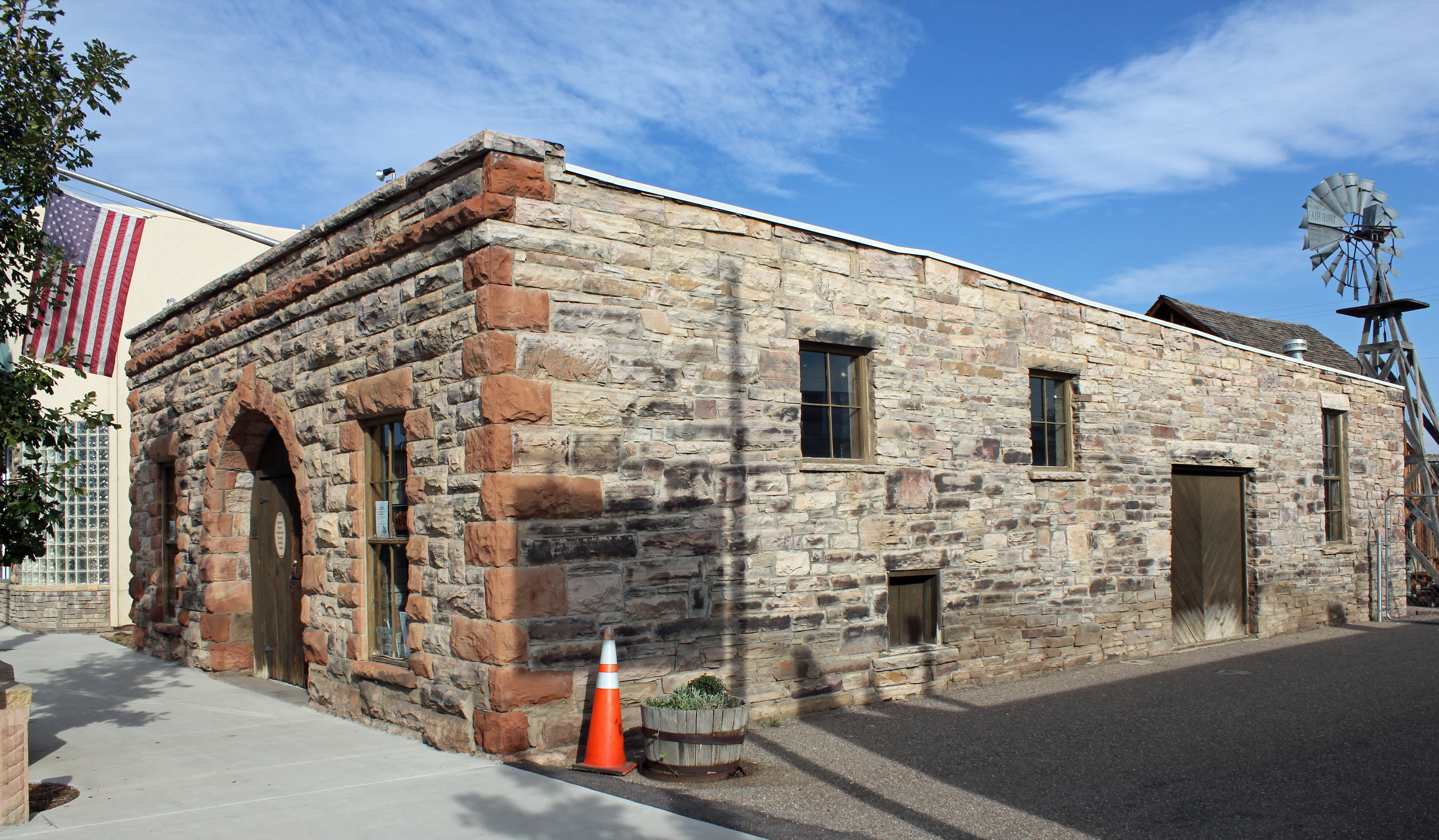
- Southern and eastern sides of the building

- Location within Colorado Location within the United States
- Nearest city: Berthoud, Colorado
- Coordinates: 40°18′21″N 105°4′32″W
- Area: less than one acre
- Built: 1893
- Architect: Alfred G. Bimson
- NRHP reference No.: 81000185
- Added to NRHP: July 23, 1981

The Bimson Blacksmith Shop was constructed in 1893 by Alfred G. Bimson as the first blacksmith shop in Berthoud, Colorado, USA. He designed and built the building out of native Lyons sandstone. The shop remained open until 1943.

The building is currently being used by the Berthoud Historical Society to house the Little Thompson Valley Pioneer Museum.

== See also ==
- National Register of Historic Places listings in Larimer County, Colorado
