= Jim Welker =

American politician

Jim Welker (born 1947) is an American politician. He is a Republican who was, until January 2007, a Colorado state representative of District 51. He is a communications businessman. Welker was first appointed into public office in 2003 and served on two committees, Business Affairs and Labor, and Transportation and Energy.

He completed Bachelor of Science degrees in math and science from Montana State University in 1969. He is married to Claudia and has two children: Claudette, 31, and Craig, 29.

== Controversies and criticism ==
Welker has come under fire from various groups in the course of his three-year political career.

=== Selling of confidential data concerning US Citizens ===
Universal Communications Co. in Loveland, Colorado, is one of 15 companies under federal investigation for illegal selling of private information such as driver license numbers, personal cell phone records, and social security numbers. On June 21, 2006, he was subpoenaed to testify at a congressional hearing. He invoked his fifth amendment rights. Welker acknowledged his Universal Communications Co. "sold cell-phone records but has denied the firm did anything illegal and has maintained the records weren't sold to the general public." The FBI said databrokers "probably act illegally."
