= Harold Ferguson High School =

Alternative school in Colorado, United States

Location
- 1811 W 15th St; Loveland, Colorado 80537; United States
- Coordinates: 40°24′31″N 105°06′11″W

Information
- Type: Alternative High School
- School district: Thompson R2-J School District
- CEEB code: 060946
- Principal: Jason Germain
- Staff: 15.92 (FTE)
- Student to teacher ratio: 7.41
- Website: fhs.tsd.org

Ferguson High School (FHS), also known as Ferguson Alternative High School, is an alternative high school in Loveland, Colorado. A part of the Thompson School District, FHS normally serves 120 - 140 students.

FHS is one of the oldest alternative, at-risk programs in the State of Colorado.

== History ==
The idea for FHS came from Mr. Ferguson, then the Principal of Loveland High School, He realized that there was a need for many Loveland students to have an alternative choice. In particular, Ferguson was concerned about students with trouble at home, legal problems, or difficulty coping with a large school.

The school opened in 1972 as "The New School" located at 125 S. Lincoln Ave, a small structure owned by the school district and located across the street from the former school district administrative offices. Mr. Ferguson hired Donald R. Cook as founding principal, a high school history teacher from Claremont, California who had launched a similar alternative high school in that area.

A few years later the school moved into a larger space at the historic Washington School building that is now part of the Civic Center. In 1982, FHS was moved to its third location at 804 East Eisenhower. In January 2009, it moved to 1101 Hilltop Drive. In 2020, the school district converted the Van Buren Elementary School into the newest location for FHS.

== Description ==
Over 1,200 students have earned their high school diplomas from FHS.

FHS has graduates are CNAs, teachers, mechanics, musicians, electricians, managers, and active members of the US military.

FHS has earned a $250,000 scholarship trust from the McKee Foundation.
