= Loveland High School (Colorado) =

Location
- 920 West 29th Street; Loveland, Colorado 80538; United States; 40°25′13″N 105°05′28″W

Information
- Type: Public
- Established: 1894 (132 years ago)
- School district: Thompson R2-J School District
- CEEB code: 060950
- Principal: Shawn Collins
- Teaching staff: 71.66 (FTE)
- Grades: 9–12
- Enrollment: 1,354 (2024-2025)
- Student to teacher ratio: 18.89
- Colors: Red and black
- Mascot: Red Wolves
- Rivals: Mountain View Mountain Lions; Thompson Valley Golden Eagles
- Website: lhs.tsd.org

Loveland High School is a public high school located in Loveland, Colorado, United States. It is one of the five high schools in the Thompson R2-J School District.

Founded more than one hundred years ago, it is the oldest high school in the district. The first class of graduates left the institution in 1894, and the most recent location was opened in 1964. Before then the school was located in downtown Loveland where Bill Reed Middle School is located. Loveland High School is an International Baccalaureate World School, the inaugural class of which graduated in May 2009.

== Demographics ==
Enrollment size is approximately 1,600 students distributed between grades 9-12, resulting in graduating classes of approximately 400 students. According to 2022-2023 data provided by the school district, the predominant ethnicities at the school are white (70.2%), hispanic (24.0%), and multi-ethnic (3.0%). The demographics of the school largely mirror the population of the city.

== Academics ==
Academic performance as measured by mean SAT composite scores in 2021 and 2022 puts Loveland High School squarely in the middle of the pack nationally, performing within 1 deviation of the mean (2022 national mean composite score = 1050, standard deviation = 216).

Standardized test scores
Year	Mean SAT composite score
2021-2022	1025
2022-2023	1019

== Mascot ==
For much of its history the school mascot was the Indians. In 2020, the child of the then school board president led the effort to remove the mascot and encouraged the school board to pass a resolution retiring the Indian mascot at Loveland High School and the closely related Warrior mascot at nearby Bill Reed Middle School. The driver for changing the mascot was sentiment that Native American mascots were deemed by the school board to be harmful and perpetuating of derogatory stereotypes. The replacement mascot was decided on by community input and the school board unveiled the Red Wolves as the new mascot for the school on October 7, 2020. The school colors remained the same red and black as they had been before the mascot change.

== Notable alumni ==
- Jeremy Bloom, Olympian and professional football player
- Jeff Byers, former center for the Carolina Panthers
- Eddie Dove, former cornerback for the San Francisco 49ers (1959–63) and New York Giants (1963)
- Ayden Eberhardt, professional football player in the CFL
- Alec Hansen, second round pick in the 2016 MLB Draft by the Chicago White Sox
- Collin Klein, head football coach at Kansas State University and 2012 Heisman Finalist
- Scot McCloughan, former general manager of the Washington Football Team
- Ryan Wood, co-founder of the Under Armour company
