= Loveland, Colorado =

City in Colorado, United States

- Home rule municipality
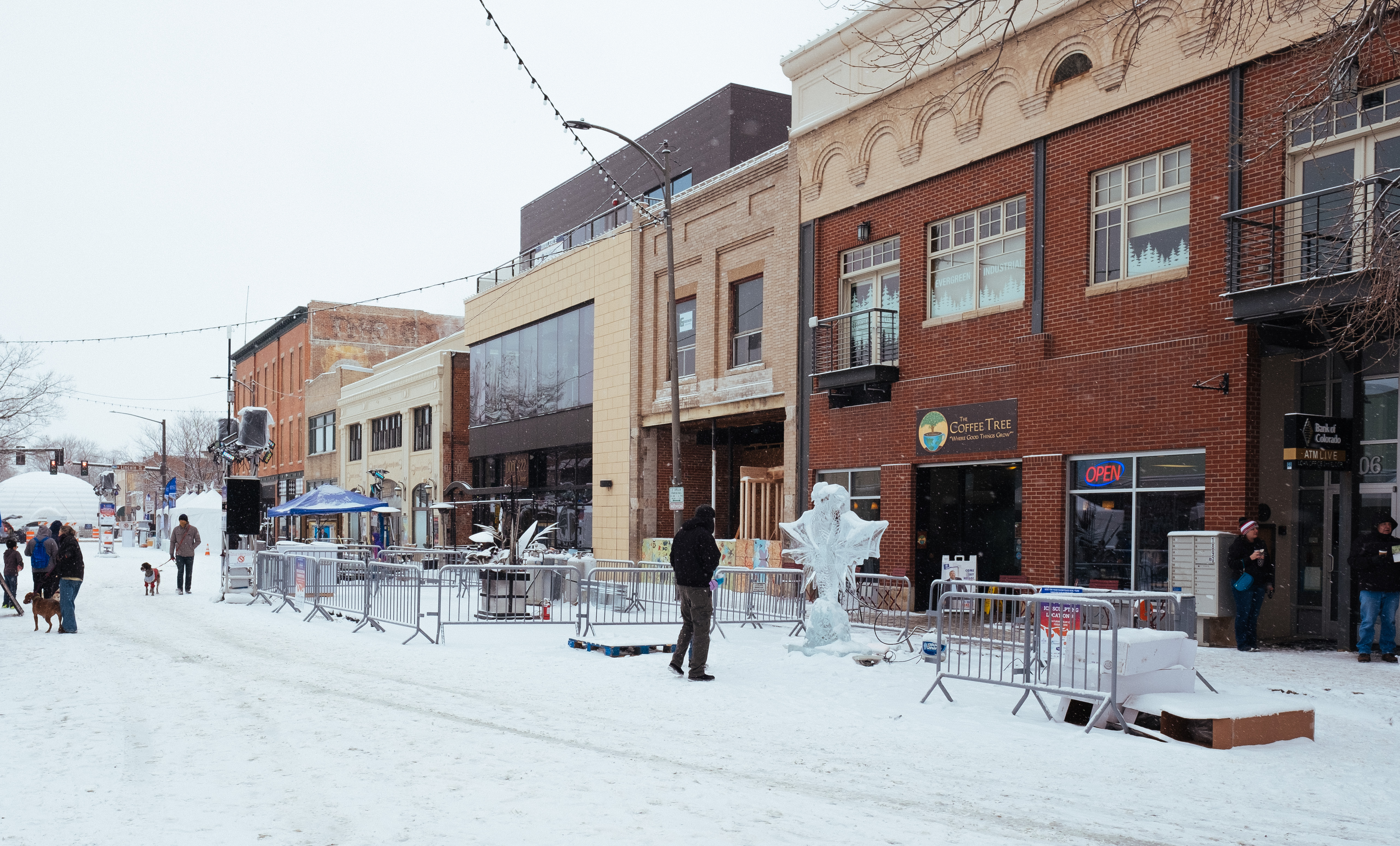

- Flag
- Nickname: The Sweetheart City
- Location within Larimer County, Colorado
- Coordinates: 40°23′27″N 105°04′19″W
- Country: United States
- State: Colorado
- County: Larimer
- City: Loveland
- Founded: 1877
- Incorporated: April 30, 1881
- Named for: William A. H. Loveland

Government
  - Type: Home rule municipality
  - Mayor: Patrick McFall
  - Mayor pro tem: Andrea Samson
  - City Manager: Jim Thompson

Area
  - Total: 35.88 sq mi (92.94 km^{2})
  - Land: 34.41 sq mi (89.11 km^{2})
  - Water: 1.48 sq mi (3.83 km^{2}) 4.13%
- Elevation: 4,997 ft (1,523 m)

Population (2020)
  - Total: 76,378
  - Estimate (2025): 81,387
  - Density: 2,220/sq mi (857.1/km^{2})
- Time zone: UTC−7 (MST)
  - Summer (DST): UTC−6 (MDT)
- ZIP Codes: 80534, 80537–80539
- Area code: 970
- FIPS code: 08-46465
- GNIS feature ID: 2410886
- Highways: I-25, US 34, US 287, SH 60, SH 402
- Website: www.cityofloveland.org

Loveland is a home rule municipality and the second most populous municipality in Larimer County, Colorado, United States. Loveland is situated 46 miles (74 km) north of the Colorado State Capitol in Denver and is the 14th most populous city in Colorado. As of the 2020 census, the population of Loveland was 76,378. The city forms part of the Fort Collins-Loveland Metropolitan Statistical Area and the Front Range Urban Corridor. The city's public schools are part of the Thompson R2-J School District.

== History ==
The Loveland area was a hub for French fur trappers in the late 18th and early 19th centuries. Mariano Medina built the first settlement in the area, Fort Namaqua, in 1858. It was a trading post and stage station, and the site is now Namaqua Park.

The nearby Big Thompson, Colorado Territory, post office opened on November 12, 1862. The Namaqua, Colorado Territory, post office operated from January 28, 1868, until January 3, 1879. The Loveland, Colorado Territory, post office operated from April 4, 1872, until January 24, 1873. Colorado became a state on August 1, 1876.

Loveland was officially founded in 1877 along the newly constructed line of the Colorado Central Railroad, near its crossing of the Big Thompson River. It was named in honor of William A. H. Loveland, the president of the Colorado Central Railroad. The city was founded one mile (1.6 km) upstream from the existing small settlement of St. Louis, the buildings of which were moved to the site of Loveland. The Big Thompson post office moved to Loveland on January 10, 1878, and the Town of Loveland was incorporated on April 30, 1881.

For the first half of the 20th century, the town was dependent on agriculture. The primary crops in the area were sugar beets and sour cherries. In 1901 the Great Western Sugar Company built a factory in Loveland, which remained as a source of employment until its closure in 1977. During the late 1920s, the Spring Glade Orchard was the largest cherry orchard west of the Mississippi River. At that time the cherry orchards produced more than $1 million worth of cherries per year. A series of droughts, attacks of blight, competition from growers in other states (particularly Michigan), and finally a killer freeze destroyed the industry. By the late 1960s, cherries were no longer farmed at scale, although orchards remained in southeast Loveland and nearby Masonville into the 1990s. In the late 20th century, the economy diversified with the arrival of manufacturing facilities by Hewlett-Packard, Teledyne, and Hach, a water quality analysis equipment manufacturer. A new medical center has added a substantial amount of employment in that sector.

=== Sundown Town ===
Loveland was known as a "sundown town", a racially segregated community which prohibited non-white travelers from remaining in their borders after the sun set. While such towns were most common in the Deep South, Loveland showed the practice existed elsewhere. Longtime Loveland residents reported anecdotes from this era such as a baseball team with African-American players not staying overnight in the city after their game, and those of Mexican and Native American ancestry being treated poorly and paid low wages. In the early 1900s, neighborhoods and Homeowner Associations prevented people of color from purchasing homes.

Before 1960, road signs welcoming travelers to Loveland read, "Welcome to Loveland – Elev. 5000 – Nationally Famous Sweetheart Town – Won’t You Stay Awhile – Industrial Opportunities – Diversified Agriculture.” A smaller handmade sign read, “We observe the Jim Crow Laws here.”"

Loveland has the largest percentage of residents in Colorado who solely identify as white. According to the 2020 census, the Black population of Loveland makes up less than 1%, and the Hispanic population is 12%. The city council began discussing plans to give non-white and other minority residents what local media called "more of a voice", but prevailing community sentiment opposed the plan due to its perceived divisiveness. As of 2021, "[a]fter nearly two years and at least six meetings that prominently featured the issue, almost no action has been taken by city councilors."

=== 1976 and 2013 floods ===
The Big Thompson Flood of 1976, is often considered to be about a 1 in 500 chance of occurring in a given year, also called a "500-year flood", by the USGS and Colorado Department of Natural Resources standards and data respectively. 37 years later, on September 12, 2013, a historic flood affected numerous areas in Colorado. It rained heavily for four consecutive days, causing most rivers and creeks to overfill their banks. Estes Park received 8 to 12 inches (200 to 300 mm) of rain, causing Lake Estes to overfill its banks. This prompted a lot of water to be released out of the dam, causing the Big Thompson River to swell. The flooding river caused sections of U.S. Highway 34, the main highway from Loveland to Estes Park, to collapse. The Big Thompson caused major flooding in Loveland, and caused numerous road closures because of flood waters. The Loveland/Fort Collins area received about 4 inches (100 mm), which is relatively less significant compared to the amount of rain other places received. Two people died as a result of the 2013 flooding in Larimer County, while 144 people were killed in the 1976 flood, with 5 bodies in the 1976 incident never found.

== Geography ==
The city is located in the Colorado Front Range region at the base of the foothills just east of the mouth of Big Thompson River Canyon at the intersection of U.S. Highway 34 and U.S. Highway 287. Longs Peak and other mountains of the Front Range are visible from much of the city.

Loveland is in southeastern Larimer County. Located south of Fort Collins, its larger neighbor and the county seat of Larimer County, both cities have expanded steadily towards each other. They are considered a single metropolitan area by the U.S. government. The establishment of county-owned open space between the two communities in the 1990s was intended to create a permanent buffer. The northern city limits are now contiguous with those of Windsor, which has expanded westward from Weld County across Interstate 25.

According to the United States Census Bureau, the city has a total area of 25.5 square miles (66 km^{2}), of which 24.6 square miles (64 km^{2}) is land, and 0.9 square miles (2.3 km^{2}) (3.68%) is water.

Loveland Pass, also named after William A.H. Loveland, is not located near the town of Loveland.

=== Climate ===
Loveland has a humid continental climate (Köppen climate classification Dfa). Its climate is characterized by warm to hot summer and long and moderately cold winter (sometimes severely). Due to its low annual precipitation, Loveland's climate can sometimes be categorized as cold semi-arid.

Loveland, Colorado has an annual snowfall of 47.0 inches (1,190 mm).

The hottest temperature recorded in Loveland was 106 °F (41 °C) on July 19, 2022, while the coldest temperature recorded was −31 °F (−35 °C) on December 22, 1990.

Climate data for Loveland, Colorado, 1991–2020 normals, extremes 1989–present
| Month | Jan | Feb | Mar | Apr | May | Jun | Jul | Aug | Sep | Oct | Nov | Dec | Year |
|---|---|---|---|---|---|---|---|---|---|---|---|---|---|
| Record high °F (°C) | 74 (23) | 75 (24) | 83 (28) | 89 (32) | 98 (37) | 103 (39) | 106 (41) | 103 (39) | 103 (39) | 90 (32) | 81 (27) | 75 (24) | 106 (41) |
| Mean maximum °F (°C) | 63.3 (17.4) | 66.1 (18.9) | 75.9 (24.4) | 81.5 (27.5) | 88.8 (31.6) | 96.1 (35.6) | 98.6 (37.0) | 96.6 (35.9) | 93.1 (33.9) | 84.2 (29.0) | 73.8 (23.2) | 63.4 (17.4) | 99.5 (37.5) |
| Mean daily maximum °F (°C) | 43.9 (6.6) | 46.2 (7.9) | 56.1 (13.4) | 62.4 (16.9) | 71.0 (21.7) | 82.7 (28.2) | 88.6 (31.4) | 86.7 (30.4) | 78.9 (26.1) | 65.2 (18.4) | 52.8 (11.6) | 43.6 (6.4) | 64.8 (18.3) |
| Daily mean °F (°C) | 28.4 (−2.0) | 30.8 (−0.7) | 39.5 (4.2) | 46.5 (8.1) | 55.4 (13.0) | 66.0 (18.9) | 71.9 (22.2) | 69.8 (21.0) | 61.5 (16.4) | 48.7 (9.3) | 37.0 (2.8) | 28.5 (−1.9) | 48.7 (9.3) |
| Mean daily minimum °F (°C) | 12.9 (−10.6) | 15.4 (−9.2) | 23.0 (−5.0) | 30.6 (−0.8) | 39.8 (4.3) | 49.2 (9.6) | 55.1 (12.8) | 52.9 (11.6) | 44.2 (6.8) | 32.2 (0.1) | 21.1 (−6.1) | 13.4 (−10.3) | 32.5 (0.3) |
| Mean minimum °F (°C) | −7.3 (−21.8) | −2.2 (−19.0) | 7.7 (−13.5) | 18.8 (−7.3) | 28.3 (−2.1) | 41.0 (5.0) | 49.7 (9.8) | 46.5 (8.1) | 33.1 (0.6) | 17.1 (−8.3) | 4.3 (−15.4) | −5.4 (−20.8) | −12.5 (−24.7) |
| Record low °F (°C) | −24 (−31) | −22 (−30) | −13 (−25) | 4 (−16) | 10 (−12) | 34 (1) | 42 (6) | 38 (3) | 25 (−4) | −8 (−22) | −15 (−26) | −31 (−35) | −31 (−35) |
| Average precipitation inches (mm) | 0.52 (13) | 0.62 (16) | 1.28 (33) | 2.18 (55) | 2.68 (68) | 1.63 (41) | 1.47 (37) | 1.29 (33) | 1.36 (35) | 1.18 (30) | 0.81 (21) | 0.58 (15) | 15.60 (396) |
| Average snowfall inches (cm) | 6.0 (15) | 8.2 (21) | 7.9 (20) | 5.7 (14) | 1.1 (2.8) | 0.0 (0.0) | 0.0 (0.0) | 0.0 (0.0) | 0.0 (0.0) | 3.5 (8.9) | 7.0 (18) | 7.6 (19) | 47.0 (119) |
| Average precipitation days (≥ 0.01 in) | 4.9 | 6.8 | 7.2 | 9.9 | 12.5 | 10.0 | 9.4 | 9.1 | 7.5 | 6.4 | 6.0 | 4.6 | 94.3 |
| Average snowy days (≥ 0.1 in) | 3.9 | 4.8 | 2.8 | 2.4 | 0.4 | 0.0 | 0.0 | 0.0 | 0.0 | 1.3 | 3.5 | 3.9 | 23.0 |
Source 1: NOAA
Source 2: National Weather Service

== Demographics ==
Historical population
| Census | Pop. | Note | %± |
|---|---|---|---|
| 1880 | 236 | | — |
| 1890 | 698 | | 195.8% |
| 1900 | 1,091 | | 56.3% |
| 1910 | 3,651 | | 234.6% |
| 1920 | 5,065 | | 38.7% |
| 1930 | 5,506 | | 8.7% |
| 1940 | 6,145 | | 11.6% |
| 1950 | 6,773 | | 10.2% |
| 1960 | 9,734 | | 43.7% |
| 1970 | 16,220 | | 66.6% |
| 1980 | 30,215 | | 86.3% |
| 1990 | 37,352 | | 23.6% |
| 2000 | 50,608 | | 35.5% |
| 2010 | 66,859 | | 32.1% |
| 2020 | 76,378 | | 14.2% |
| 2025 (est.) | 81,387 | ▲ | 6.6% |
U.S. Decennial Census 2020

As of the census of 2000, there were 50,608 people, 19,741 households, and 14,035 families residing in the city. The population density was 2,059.7 inhabitants per square mile (795.3/km^{2}). There were 20,299 housing units at an average density of 826.2 per square mile (319.0/km^{2}). The racial makeup of the city was 92.85% White, 0.37% Black, 0.69% Native American, 0.83% Asian, 0.03% Pacific Islander, 3.21% from other races, and 2.02% from two or more races. Hispanic or Latino of any race were 8.57% of the population.

In 2020, the population of Loveland was 76,378, which is a 51% increase from the population in 2000 census. The racial makeup of the city has changed to 84% White, 9% two or more races, 4% from other races, 1.2% from Asian, and 0.9% Black. Of those, Hispanic or Latino of any race makes up 13% of the population, and Non-Hispanic Whites makes up 79.7% of Loveland's population.

There were 19,741 households, out of which 35.3% had children under the age of 18 living with them, 57.5% were married couples living together, 9.8% had a female householder with no husband present, and 28.9% were non-families. Of all households, 23.4% were made up of individuals, and 8.8% had someone living alone who was 65 years of age or older. The average household size was 2.55 and the average family size was 3.01.

In the city, the population was spread out, with 26.9% under the age of 18, 7.8% from 18 to 24, 30.6% from 25 to 44, 22.1% from 45 to 64, and 12.5% who were 65 years of age or older. The median age was 36 years. For every 100 females, there were 96.1 males. For every 100 females age 18 and over, there were 92.4 males.

The median income for a household in the city was $47,119, and the median income for a family was $54,337. Males had a median income of $38,971 versus $26,714 for females. The per capita income for the city was $21,889. About 4.0% of families and 5.7% of the population were below the poverty line, including 6.7% of those under age 18 and 5.0% of those age 65 or over.

== Economy ==
Because of its location along U.S. 34, at one of the principal access routes to Estes Park and Rocky Mountain National Park, Loveland receives a significant amount of pass-through tourist traffic, especially in the summer months. In addition, the city serves as a bedroom community to commuters in many directions: to employment locations in Boulder, Westminster and other parts of the Denver Metropolitan area; and also to the college towns of Fort Collins (CSU), Greeley (UNC), and Boulder (CU).

Loveland has aggressively expanded its incorporated limits eastward to embrace the interchange of Interstate 25 and U.S. Highway 34, and is currently developing the area. The intersection has become a primary commercial hub of northern Colorado, with the construction of shopping centers and the Blue Arena. A new medical center and mall have also been built at the I-25/US-34 interchange. This area is known as Centerra. The interchange is shared with its smaller neighbor Johnstown, of Weld County.

=== Valentine Re-Mailing Program ===
Loveland is the home of the Valentine Re-Mailing Program. For decades people from across the world have sent their valentines to Loveland, Colorado, to be hand-stamped with a cachet and verse, and a specially designed postal cancellation. A new verse and stamp are selected each year through a contest held by the Loveland Chamber of Commerce and residents can submit their poems and artwork to be judged. On average, this program re-mails more than 160,000 cards from the United States and more than 110 countries. Loveland's Valentine Re-mailing Program has inspired many other Valentine's Day programs including the Official Loveland Valentine, Miss Loveland Valentine and the Thompson Valley Rotary Heart's Program.

Loveland's Valentine Re-mailing Program began in January 1947 by Ted Thompson and Elmer Ivers, the Loveland postmaster after Ivers received about 30 valentines from individuals requesting to have the cards postmarked from Loveland for "a romantic extra touch." The two thought re-mailing valentines would be an opportunity to advertise Loveland, and the Loveland Chamber of Commerce agreed to promote the service. Thompson designed a cachet with the message, "A Valentine Greeting from Sweetheart Town, Loveland, Colorado," and the image was a heart pierced by an arrow over the Rocky Mountains. The cachet was used twice, then Thompson started the tradition of changing it each year at the request of collectors. Since then, a different verse and design have been used every year.

In addition to the mailing program, community members can pay to purchase a large valentine message on wooden hearts that are displayed on the streets across Loveland. Many of these public valentines are engagement proposals, anniversary messages, and annual traditions.

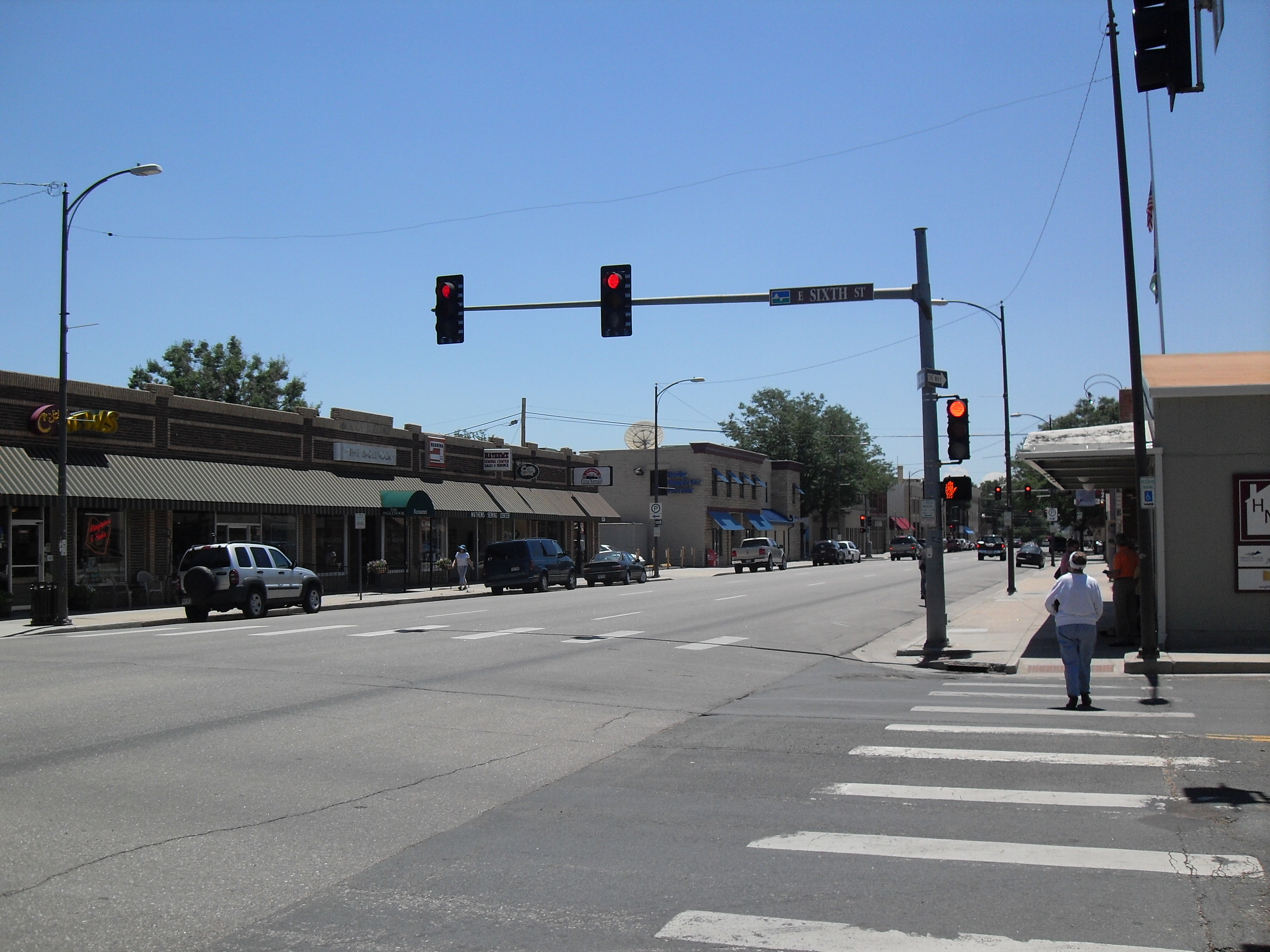
Cleveland Avenue in downtown Loveland

== Arts and culture ==
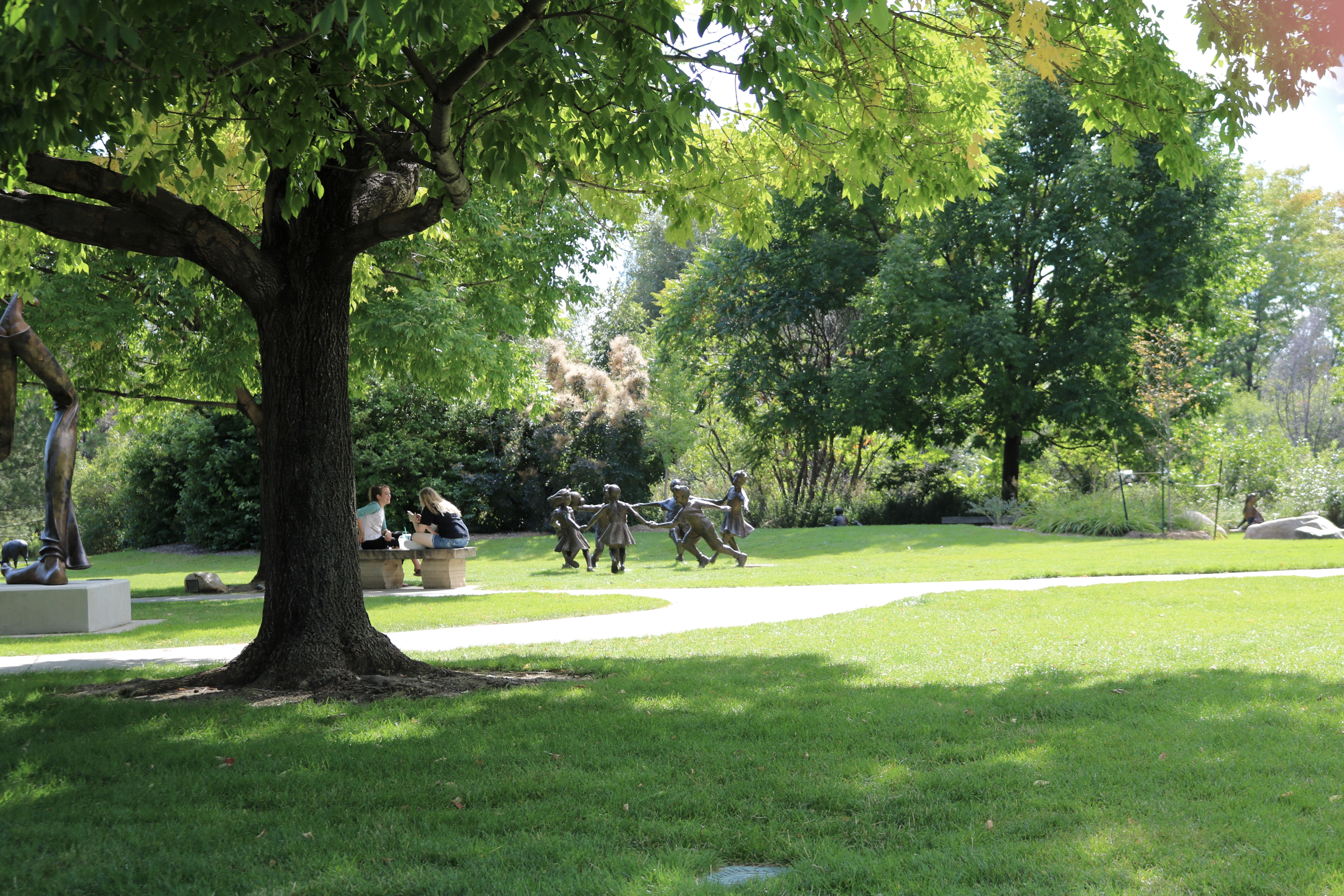
Benson Park sculpture garden

There is a large population of artists in Loveland, which has drawn three foundries, an art museum, and the annual sculpture shows in August. The city is a major business center for northern Colorado.

Loveland has 475 pieces of art in its public arts collection. While the arts collection consists primarily of sculpture, the collection also includes murals and other flat work. Over 150 pieces of the city's sculpture can be found in Benson Sculpture Garden.

The Sculpture in the Park show, hosted by the Loveland High Plains Arts Council, takes place annually in August and exhibits artwork from artists from the United States and the world.

== Parks and recreation ==
Lake Loveland, an early agricultural reservoir in the irrigation system of the region, is located in the city limits. Today, the lake functions as a primary water supply for the city of Greeley. Although the City has historically operated a swim beach on Lake Loveland, recreation rights belong to the homeowners whose properties surround the lake. Public fishing is available from the public shorelines located along Southshore Parkway and North Lake Park.

== Government ==
City Council:
| Mayor | Patrick McFall |
| Ward 1 | Jen Swanty and Geoff Frahm |
| Ward 2 | Andrea Samson and Sarah Rothberg |
| Ward 3 | Caitlin Wyrick and Kalina Middleton |
| Ward 4 | Laura Light-Kovacs and Zeke Cortez |

Loveland is a home-rule, council-manager form of government. The city council is a nine-member policy-making board, led by the mayor, who is elected for a two-year term by the community at large.

The mayor has the same voting rights as all other council members and is responsible for presiding over council meetings. This position is recognized as the city government leader for all ceremonial purposes. The council elects, by majority vote, a mayor pro tem to serve the same term as the mayor. The mayor pro tem is expected to perform responsibilities of the mayor when the mayor is absent or unable to perform their duties.

Two council members are elected from each ward to serve four-year terms. There are four wards in the city. The council member representing the ward must have lived in the ward for 12 consecutive months immediately preceding the election.

Loveland is represented in Congress by Representative Lauren Boebert (Republican). On the state level, the city lies in the 15th district of the Colorado Senate, represented by Democrat Janice Marchman, and in the 51st district of the Colorado House of Representatives, represented by Republican Ron Weinberg.

=== Law enforcement ===
The Loveland Police Department has been involved in multiple controversies, including the arrest of Karen Garner, a 73-year-old woman with dementia, the shooting of and order of euthanasia on a one-year-old puppy, and the arrest of and usage of excessive force on a good samaritan. Between 2011 and 2019, the department had the second highest rate of police shootings among cities in Colorado. The chief of police in Loveland is Tim Doran, who was sworn in on January 3, 2023.

== Education ==
=== Continuing education ===
- Aims Community College
- Colorado Christian University (Northern Colorado Center satellite site)

=== High schools ===
- Harold Ferguson High School
- Loveland High School
- Mountain View High School
- Thompson Valley High School
- Loveland Classical High School

== Transportation ==
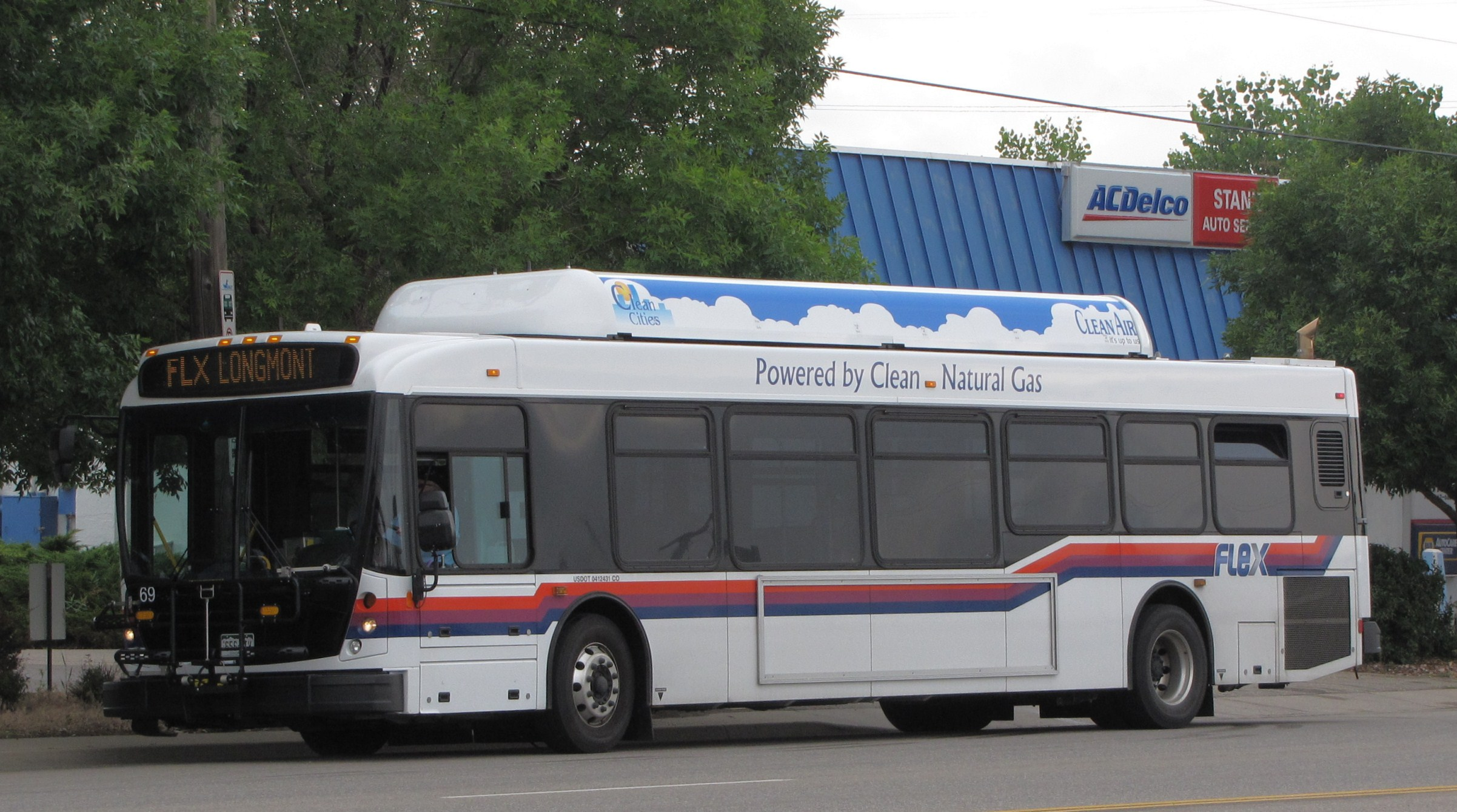
FLEX bus powered by CNG

The Fort Collins / Loveland Airport serves corporate and general aviation needs, but does not currently have commercial airline service. The closest commercial/commuter airport is Denver International Airport, 70 miles (110 km) to the south, which is served by nearly twenty airlines. Loveland can be approached from Denver by car via Interstate 25. Hourly shared shuttle services to and from DIA are also offered by Groome Transportation and Landline to reach the Loveland and Fort Collins area.

U.S. Highway 34 runs east to west into the mountains through Loveland. It becomes Eisenhower Boulevard in the city, dividing it in half. Loveland's two main ZIP Codes (80538 and 80537) are separated by this highway. A Tesla Supercharger was built and operational in the city by the end of December 2016.

The city bus system in Loveland is called COLT (City of Loveland Transit).

Loveland is connected to Fort Collins, Berthoud, and Longmont via the FLEX regional bus route and to Denver via the Bustang interregional express bus. It is additionally connected to the city of Greeley and the town of Windsor via the Poudre Express regional bus route.

== Notable people ==
- Wayne Allard, politician
- Jeremy Bloom, skier and football player
- Molly Bloom, author noted for Molly's Game
- Jeff Byers, football player
- Lindsey Daugherty, attorney and politician
- Robert Evett, composer and journalist
- Alexi Grewal, cyclist
- Meredith Hodges, equine trainer and author
- Kyle Howard, actor
- Collin Klein, football player
- Jeff Lucas, writer/broadcaster
- George Lundeen, sculptor
- Don Marostica, politician
- Marilyn Martinez, comic
- Scot McCloughan, football
- James Niehues, illustrator
- Emily Rosa, scientist
- Sarah Milner Smith, first teacher in Loveland

== See also ==
- Fort Namaqua
- Loveland Chamber of Commerce
- Medical Center of the Rockies
