= Pawnee Buttes =

Buttes in Colorado, United States

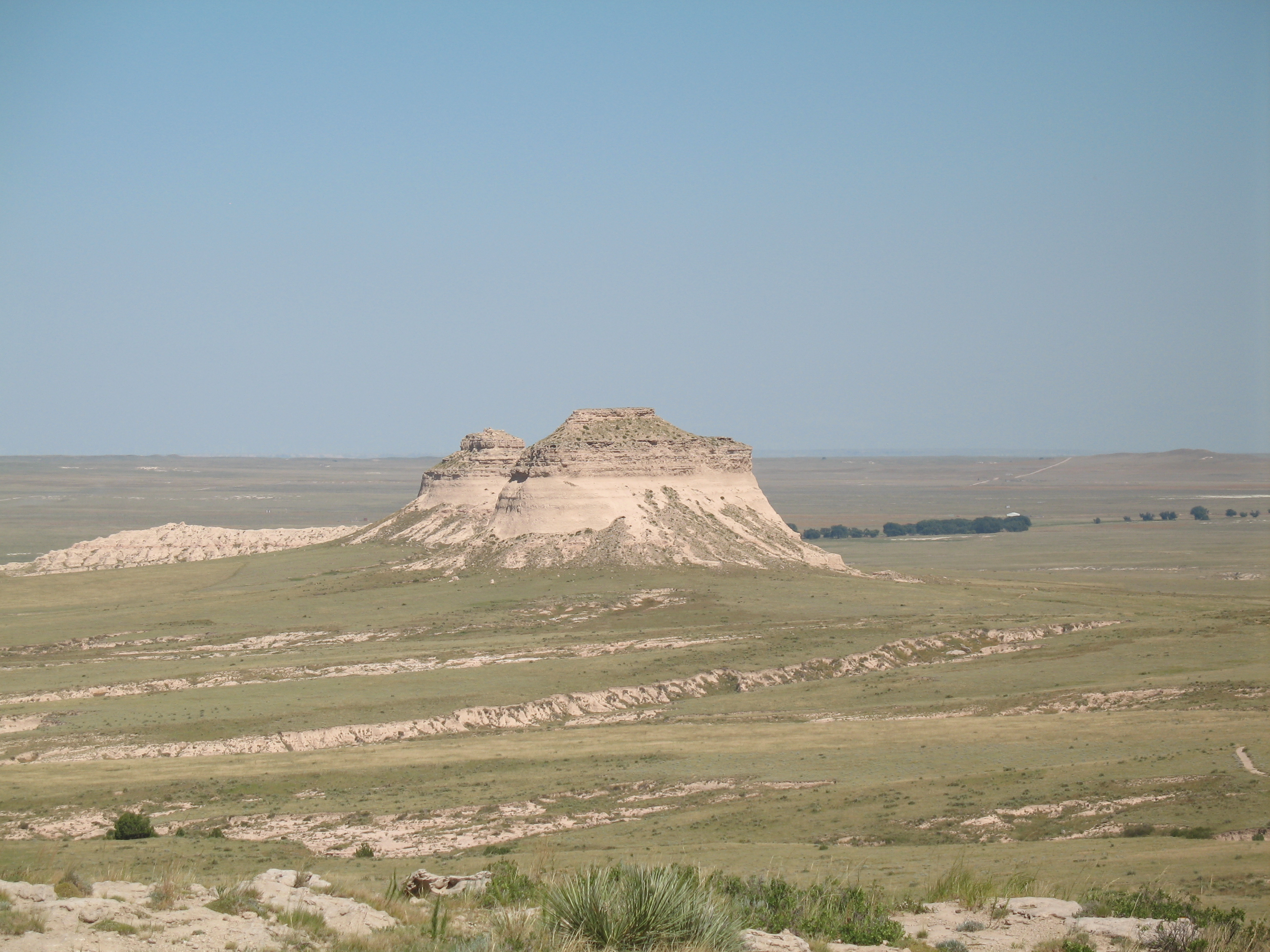
- Pawnee Buttes and National Grassland

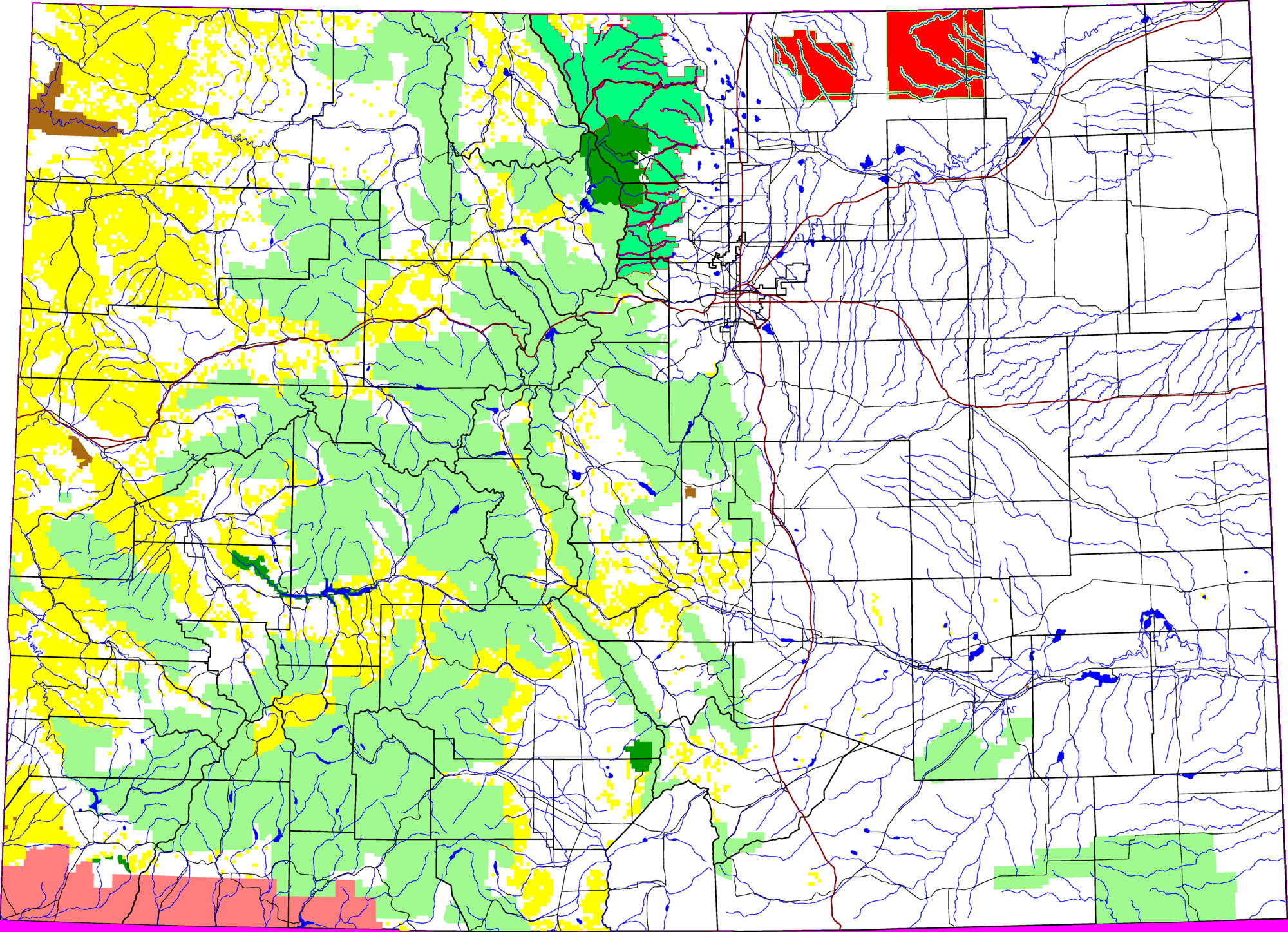
- Map of Colorado with Pawnee National Grasslands highlighted in red
- Location: Keota, Colorado, Weld County, Colorado, United States
- Coordinates: 40°49′24″N 103°58′10″W
- Elevation: 1,594 m (5,230 ft)
- Established: United States National Grassland
- Operator: United States Forest Service

The Pawnee Buttes are two prominent buttes in northeastern Colorado. The west butte is located within the Pawnee National Grassland, while the east butte is on private land in Weld County. Rising approximately 300 feet (91 m) above the surrounding plains, the buttes are erosional remnants left standing in isolation as the surrounding High Plains surface has gradually worn away. The lower portions of the buttes are composed of relatively soft, clay-rich sedimentary rock called the Brule formation. The Brule formation is protected by an overlying layer of sandstone and conglomerate sediments called the Arikaree formation, which are more resistant to weathering.

== Geology ==
The buttes are in the northeastern edge of the Colorado Piedmont. To the north, the piedmont is bordered by the Chalk Bluffs, an escarpment on the edge of the High Plains. As the rains and snows slowly erode the bluffs, the piedmont grows towards the north. Stream capture expands the piedmont rapidly towards the upslope or westward. The Buttes themselves are remnants of the High Plains surrounded by the piedmont. Another remnant of the high plains is to the west where the Chalk Bluffs form the eastern edge.

The Buttes are a consolidation of several geological ages. The main mass of the butte is the lower half to two-thirds. It is a buff-colored layer from the Brule member of the White River Formation. It is from the Oligocene Epoch (25-40 mya). Below this level and visible only further east than the buttes is the Chadron member of the White River Formation. Above the Brule layer is the Pawnee Creek Formation from the Upper Miocene (20 mya). The cap of the buttes is the Arikaree Formation, also of the Miocene age. Research in the 1970s suggest that the upper level of the cap rock is of the Ogallala Formation from the Pliocene. The Pliocene layers exist further to the north in the High Plains region. The cap rock is a harder mixture of sandstone and conglomerate, while the Brule layers are a softer clay. The surrounding area is considered a badlands as North Pawnee Creek cuts numerous channels into the Brule Formation soils.

=== Vegetative zones ===
- ‘’’Short Grass’’’ prairies surround the buttes. They are dominated by Blue grama and buffalo grass. Associated plants include the Thread-leaf sedge, ring muhly, western wheatgrass, and the prickly pear cactus.
- ‘’’Mixed Prairie’’’ are the lighter and more sandy soils, on the heights. The dominant plants are the Needle and thread grass, western wheatgrass, Junegrass, along with short grass plants. There is a wider mix of vegetation which becomes more noticeable in spring and early summer when Broom snakeweed, fringed sage, plus various forbs, including milkvetches, and locoweeds are highly visible. The mixed prairie has the greatest variety of plants.
- The ‘’’Little Bluestem’’’ is found across the entire grasslands, but it dominates in localized plots. These are in the swales and along north-facing slopes where the shade will retain water longer. Around the west butte, pockets are along the north and northeast facing slopes where the shade will retain water longer. These will also be Little Bluestem and a mix of Canada rye, Phlox, borges, and a mix of grasses and forbs.
- ‘’’Clay Barrens’’’ surround the buttes, where the Brule Formation is exposed. Here taproots dominate with hooker sandwort, tufted milk vetch, and common commandra. Several of these species use rhizomes to root spread following small fractures in the clays. Other plants associated with the Clay barrens are; Phlox, Indian rice grass, Penstemon, and evening primrose. Where there is active erosion, there are no plants.

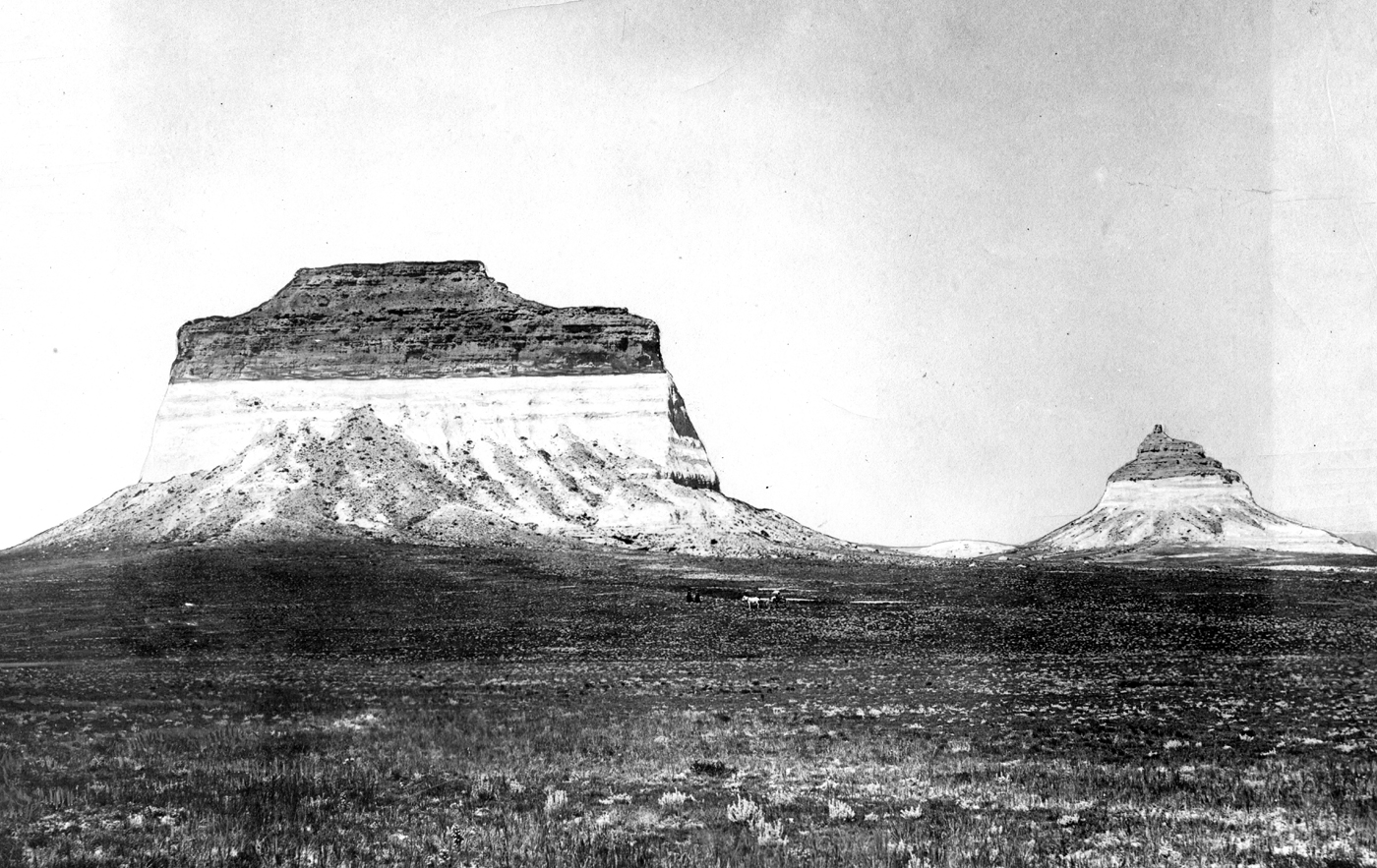
Pawnee Buttes (1900)

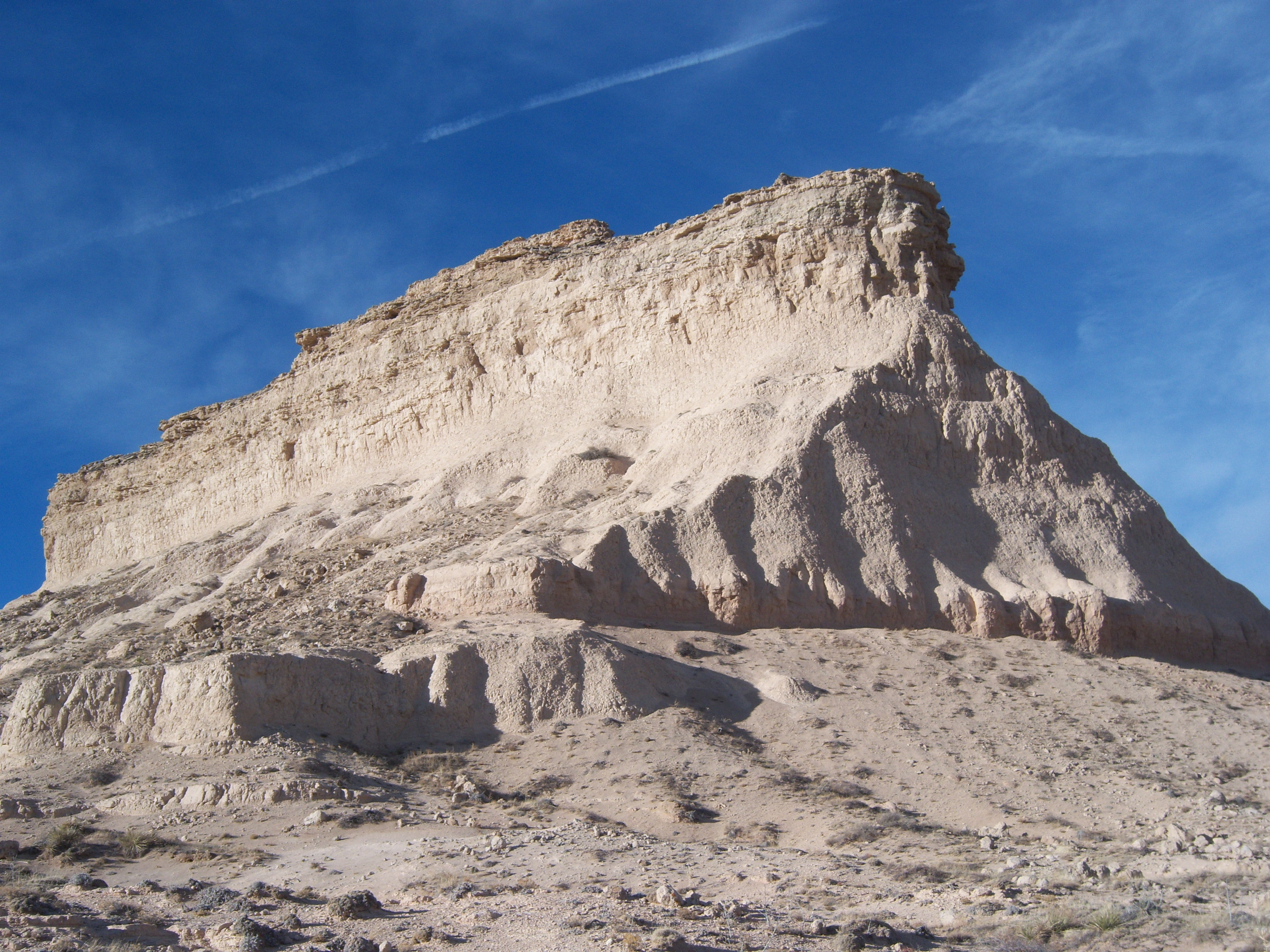
West Pawnee Butte (2008)

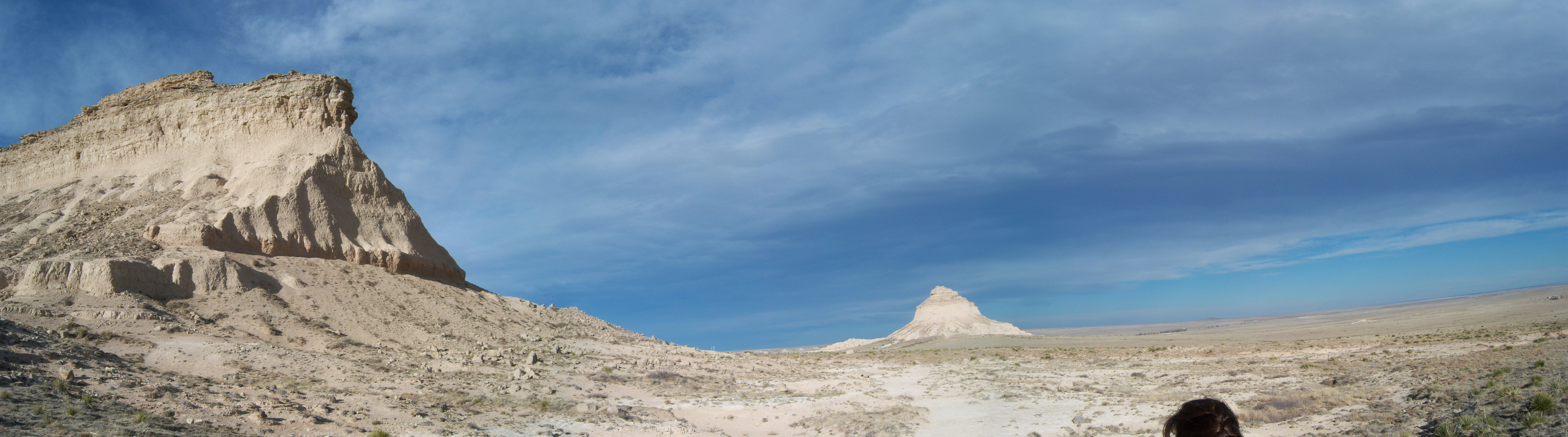
East and West Buttes Panoramic (2008)

== Pawnee Buttes Trail ==
The Pawnee Buttes Trail is noted for its scenery and birdwatching potential. The Overlook, the Lipps Bluff trail, and the area within 200 yards of the cliffs are closed to hikers from March 1 to June 30, to protect nesting falcons, eagles, and hawks. Hikers are encouraged to keep away from these areas during that time to minimize disturbance to the nesting birds.

== Appearance in James A. Michener's, Centennial ==
The Pawnee Buttes feature proximately in James A. Michener's 1974 novel, Centennial. Dubbed the 'Rattlesnake Buttes' they form the backdrop for the nearby fictional town of which the novel is centred around.

Subsequently the Pawnee Buttes area was also utilised as a filming location for various scenes in the 1978 Centennial miniseries which is an adaption of James A. Michener's novel.

== See also ==
- Butte
- Mesa
- Chalk Bluffs
- Arikaree Breaks
- Scotts Bluff
- Courthouse and Jail Rocks
- Chimney Rock
- Monument Rocks
- Castle Rock
