= Pawnee National Grassland =

Area of protected federal lands in northeastern Colorado

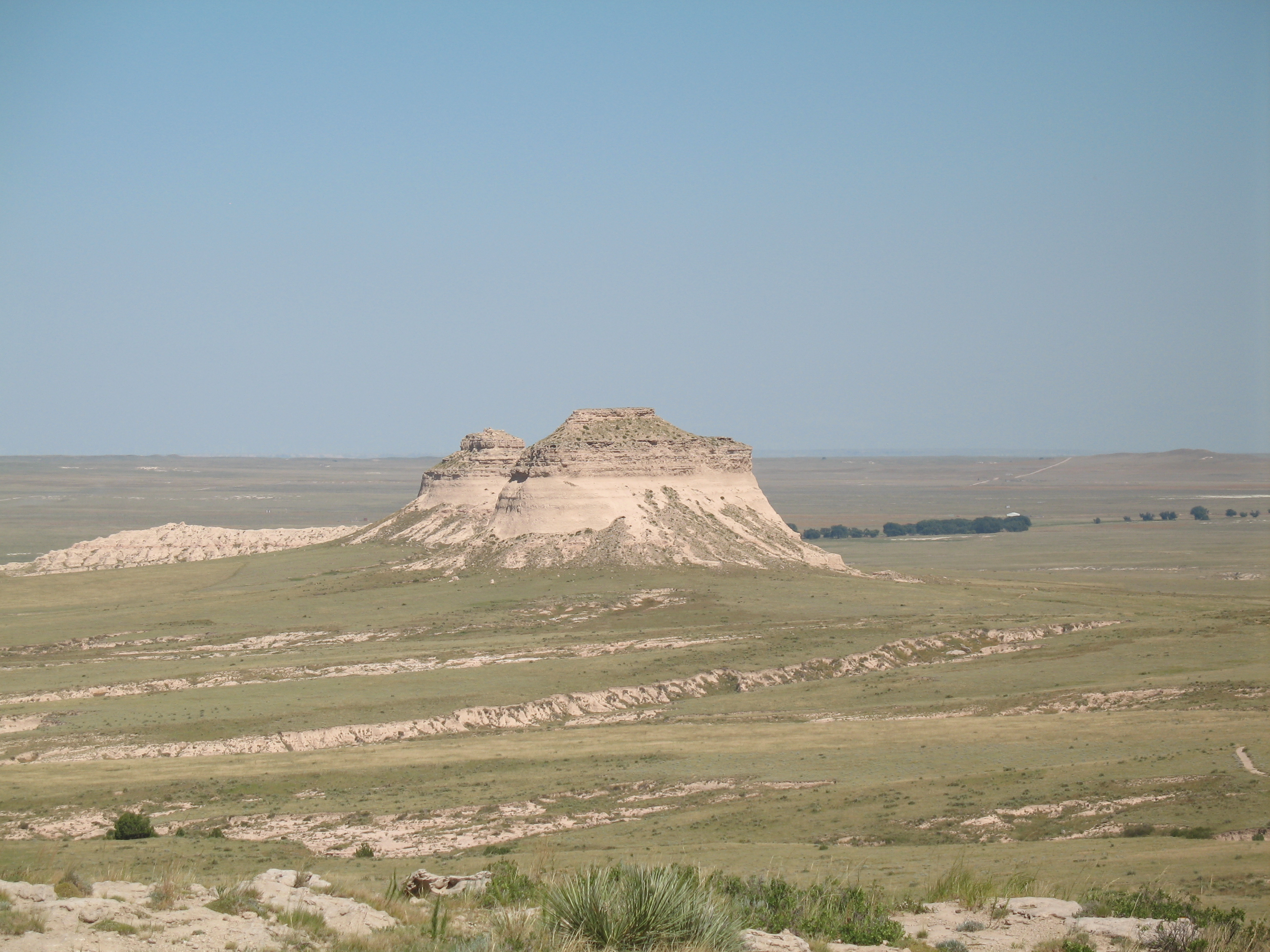
- The Pawnee Buttes in Pawnee National Grassland

- Location within the United States
- Interactive map of Pawnee National Grassland
- Location: Weld County, Colorado, United States
- Nearest city: Greeley, Colorado
- Coordinates: 40°48′29″N 103°59′21″W
- Area: 193,060 acres (781.3 km^{2})
- Established: 1960
- Governing body: U.S. Forest Service
- Website: Arapaho & Roosevelt National Forests and Pawnee National Grassland

Pawnee National Grassland is a United States National Grassland located in northeastern Colorado on the Colorado Eastern Plains. The grassland is located in the South Platte River basin in remote northern and extreme northeastern Weld County between Greeley and Sterling. It comprises two parcels totaling 193,060 acres (78,130 ha) largely between State Highway 14 and the Wyoming border. The larger eastern parcel lies adjacent to the borders of both Nebraska and Wyoming. It is administered in conjunction with the Arapaho-Roosevelt National Forest from the U.S. Forest Service office in Fort Collins, with a local ranger district office in Greeley.

The grassland is in an especially depopulated area of the Great Plains. It saw limited cultivation in the early 20th century but was withdrawn from farming after the Dust Bowl. The communities of Keota and Purcell are located within the grassland. The town of Grover is located directly between the two large parcels of the grasslands near Crow Creek. Briggsdale sits at the southern end where State Highway 14 and State Highway 392 meet. State Highway 71 traverses the eastern unit north of Stoneham. The eastern unit is drained by Pawnee Creek, a tributary of the South Platte. The western unit is largely drained by Crow Creek.

== Recreation and access ==
Camping is available at the Crow Valley Recreation Area northwest of Briggsdale. The grassland contains several hiking trails, including one that allows foot access to the Pawnee Buttes, the most notable geologic feature of the grasslands. Bird watching is a popular recreational activity for day hikers, especially at the Chalk Bluffs, a raptor nesting site.

Recreational activities on the Pawnee Grasslands have been somewhat curtailed over the last 10 years due to the discovery of extractable oil and natural gas. According to the US Forest Service, there are 63 active vertical oil and natural gas wells, and less than 3,000 acres of the 193,060 acres is protected from drilling.

== Geology ==
The grasslands is a joining of two soil types. In the east are prairie soils that are deep, and dark or reddish. From the west are chernozems of a chestnut, becoming brown. The chestnut soils are the dominant type across the areas. These soils develop in semiarid climates with 15 to 20 inches (38 to 51 cm) of rain annually. They are associated with buffalo grass and blue grama. Around the buttes, the soils are most likely brown soils which are characteristic of cool, semiarid condition and are evidenced by short grasses and shrubs.

Water is available from a Cretaceous period aquifer. Three springs are in the vicinity of the buttes: Nelson Ranch 1 mile (1.6 km) north, old Linglebach Homestead 1 mile (1.6 km) south, and an arroyo 0.51 miles (0.8 km) west. The main access to the aquifer is by windmill pumps. The aquifer is recharged from the west and flows eastward. There are Tertiary and Quaternary aquifers which are recharged by precipitation and seepage from streams. The Brule Formation, where available provides a large quantity of water.

== Shortgrass prairie ==
The grassland is a part of the short grass plains of North America. The best example of this ecosystem are preserved around the Pawnee Buttes where grazing and intensive agriculture have had less impact. There are eleven vegetation zones represented with the most unique being the scarp woodlands on the north face of the buttes. Typical of higher elevations, there are limber pines and relicts of an ice-age forest.

The wildlife of the grasslands is best represented near the buttes, with pronghorn, deer, bison, prairie dog, coyotes, black-tailed jackrabbit, and numerous rodents. Nesting birds include the golden eagle and prairie falcons.

=== Vegetative zones ===
- Short grass prairies cover the open flatlands at the below the buttes and the escarpments. They are dominated by blue grama and buffalo grass. Associated plants include the thread-leaf sedge, ring muhly, western wheatgrass, and the prickly pear cactus. The western wheatgrass dominates in "buffalo wallows" or other low patches.
- Mixed prairie are the lighter and more sandy soils, found on the heights. The dominant plants are the needle and thread grass, western wheatgrass, Junegrass, along with short grass plants. There is a wider mix of vegetation which becomes more noticeable in spring and early summer when broom snakeweed, fringed sage, plus various forbs, including milkvetches, and locoweeds are highly visible. The mixed prairie has the greatest variety of plants.
- The little bluestem is found across the entire grasslands, but it dominates in localized plots. These are in the swales and along north facing slopes where the shade will retain water longer. The same applies to soils that are sandy and gravelly. These areas are populated by little bluestem and a mix of Canada rye, phlox, borges, and a mix of grasses and forbs.
- Shrub steppe areas are similar to the short grass and mixed prairie, but with a greater alkalinity. Thus, the fourwing saltbush dominates these areas. They are found along the bottom of the escarpments. There is a variety of shrubs and forbs, but the key plants will be the saltbush and other alkaline loving plants, i.e., small soapweed and common winterfat.
- Arroyos form near the escarpments along major drainage. Arroyos can be up to 30 feet (9.1 m) deep. There is no standing water, but the volume of water from each rain event allows the soils to hold moisture for a longer period. Here the dominant plants are larger shrubs or small trees, Rocky Mountain juniper and choke cherry. The moister soils allow for current, gooseberry, and other shrubs similar to the breaks environment. There will also be little bluestem and Canada rye found.
- Clay barrens are dominated by the eroding Brule Formation. Here taproots are necessary for survival, such as mountain cryptantha, hooker sandwort, tufted milk vetch, and common commandra. Several of these species use rhizomes to spread, often following small fractures in the clays. Other plants associated with the clay barrens are; phlox, Indian rice grass, Penstemon, and evening primrose. Where there is active erosion, there are no plants.
- Break shrub are areas of broken rock. They can be along the upper edge of an escarpment, shelves on vertical slopes or rocky areas at the bottom of a cliff. These areas provide tenuous holds and deep rooting plants dominate. The skunk brush sumac and gooseberry are characteristic. There may also be mountain mahogany, little bluestem, and roses.
- Scarp woodlands are found on the north-facing cliff edges and rocky areas. They are in the narrow canyons draining northwards, providing water, and protection against evaporation. Here larger trees can take root, such as limber pine, small ponderosa pines, and Rocky Mountain juniper. These are in addition to the break shrubs found on less protected northern slopes.
- Willow Spring is the only natural water source near the buttes. Here water loving peach-leaf willow abound along with a variety of sedges.
- Bare rocks offer a limited chance for growth to crustose lichens, Caloplaca, and Lanconroa calcarea.
- Road edges receive runoff from the hard pack road surface. Invasive plants move into the initial disturbance and find adequate water to remain. The dominant plants are: Russian thistle, veiny dock, sweet clover, prickly poppy, kochia, and sunflower. Native plants include: bee flower, Indian ricegrass, sedges, grasses, and forbs.

== Flora ==
Wildflowers bloom from April through September. The best locations for viewing wildflowers are near rocky outcrops or wet potholes, such as are found near the Pawnee Buttes.

- Blue flax (Linum lewisii)
- Buffalo bur (Solanum rostratum)
- Cryptantha (Cryptantha species)
- Groundsel (Senecio species)
- Hartweg evening primrose (Calylophus hartwegii)
- Hood's phlox (Phlox hoodii)
- Narrow-leaved penstemon (Penstemon angustifolius)
- Nuttall's violet (Viola nuttallii)
- Pink cleome (Cleome serrulata)
- Plains prickly pear cactus (Opuntia polyacantha)
- Prairie coneflower (Ratibida columnifera)
- Prairie evening primrose (Oenothera albicaulis)
- Prairie onion (Allium textile)
- Prairie snowball (Abronia fragrans)
- Puccoon (Lithospermum incisum)
- Purple ground cherry (Quincula lobata)
- Salsify (Tragopogon major)
- Scarlet globe mallow (Sphaeralcea coccinea)
- Snow on the mountain (Agaloma marginata)
- Star lily (Leucocrinum montanum)
- Sunflowers (Helianthus species)
- Tansy aster (Machaeranthera tanacetifolia)
- Threadleaf yellowrays (Thelesperma filifolium)
- Tufted sandwort (Arenaria hookeri)
- Western wallflower (Erysimum spermum)
- Wooly locoweed (Astragalus mollissimus)
- Yucca (Yucca angustifolia)

== Gallery ==
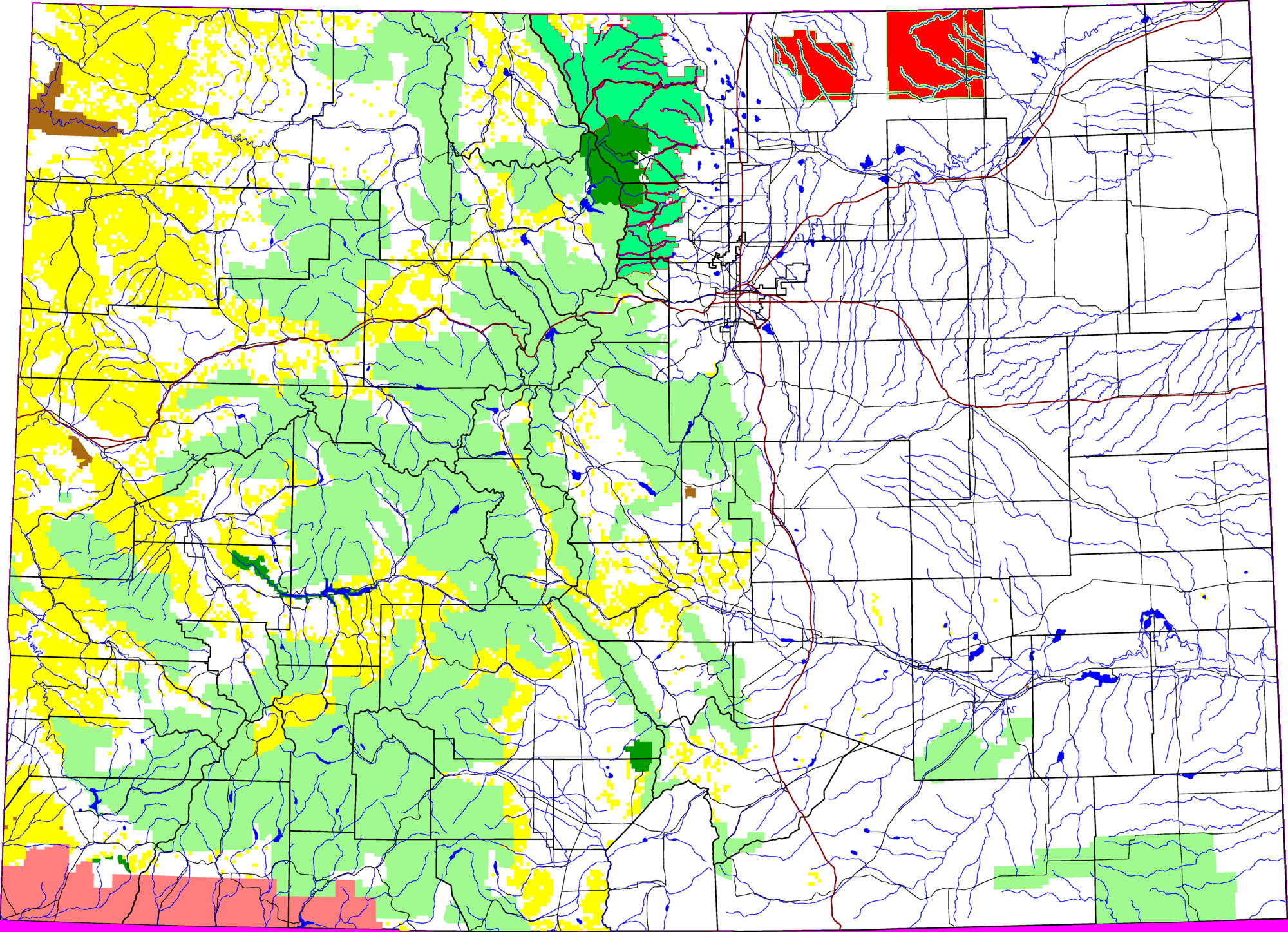
Colorado, with Pawnee National Grassland highlighted in red.

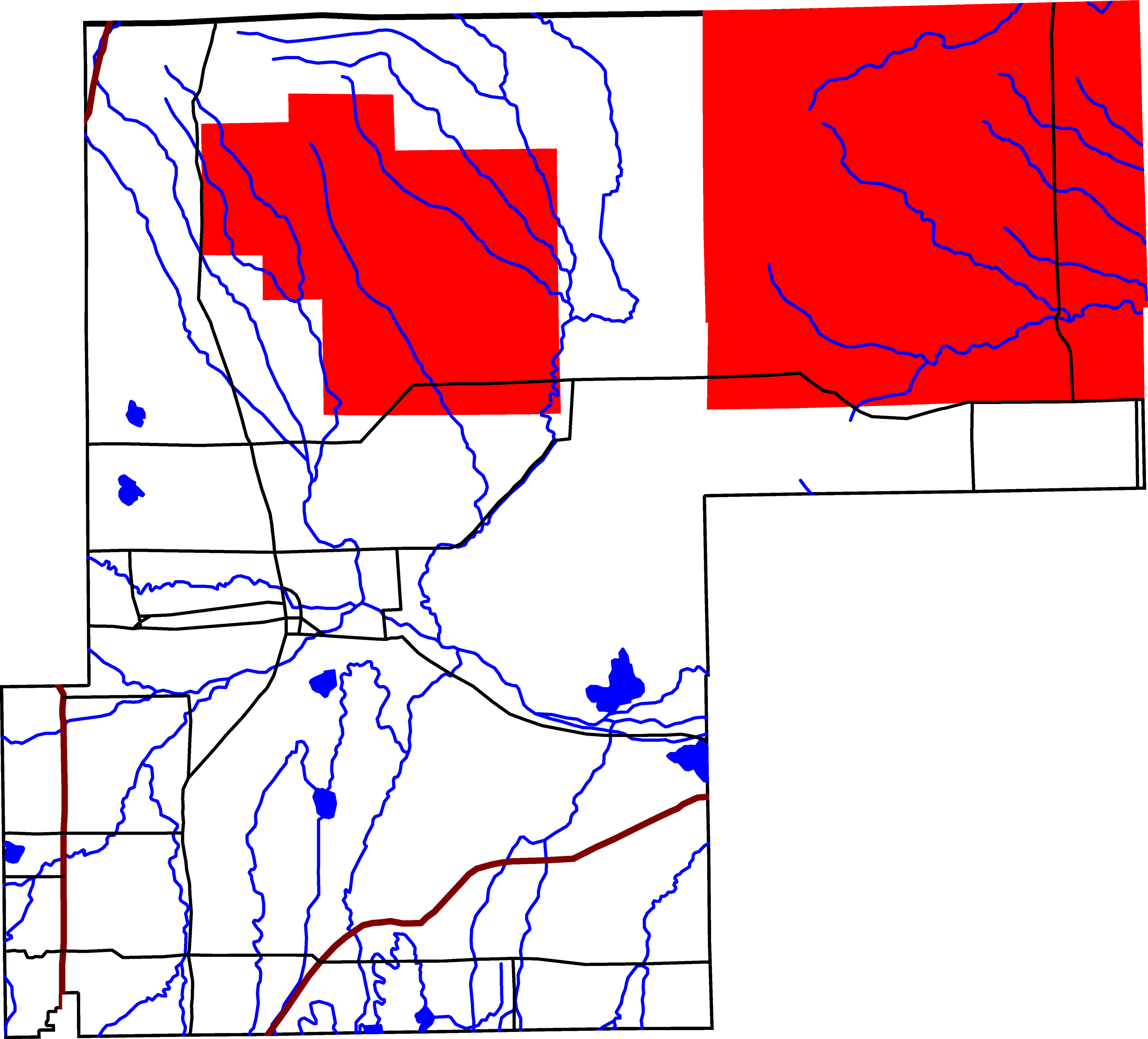
Weld County, Colorado with Pawnee National Grassland highlighted in red.

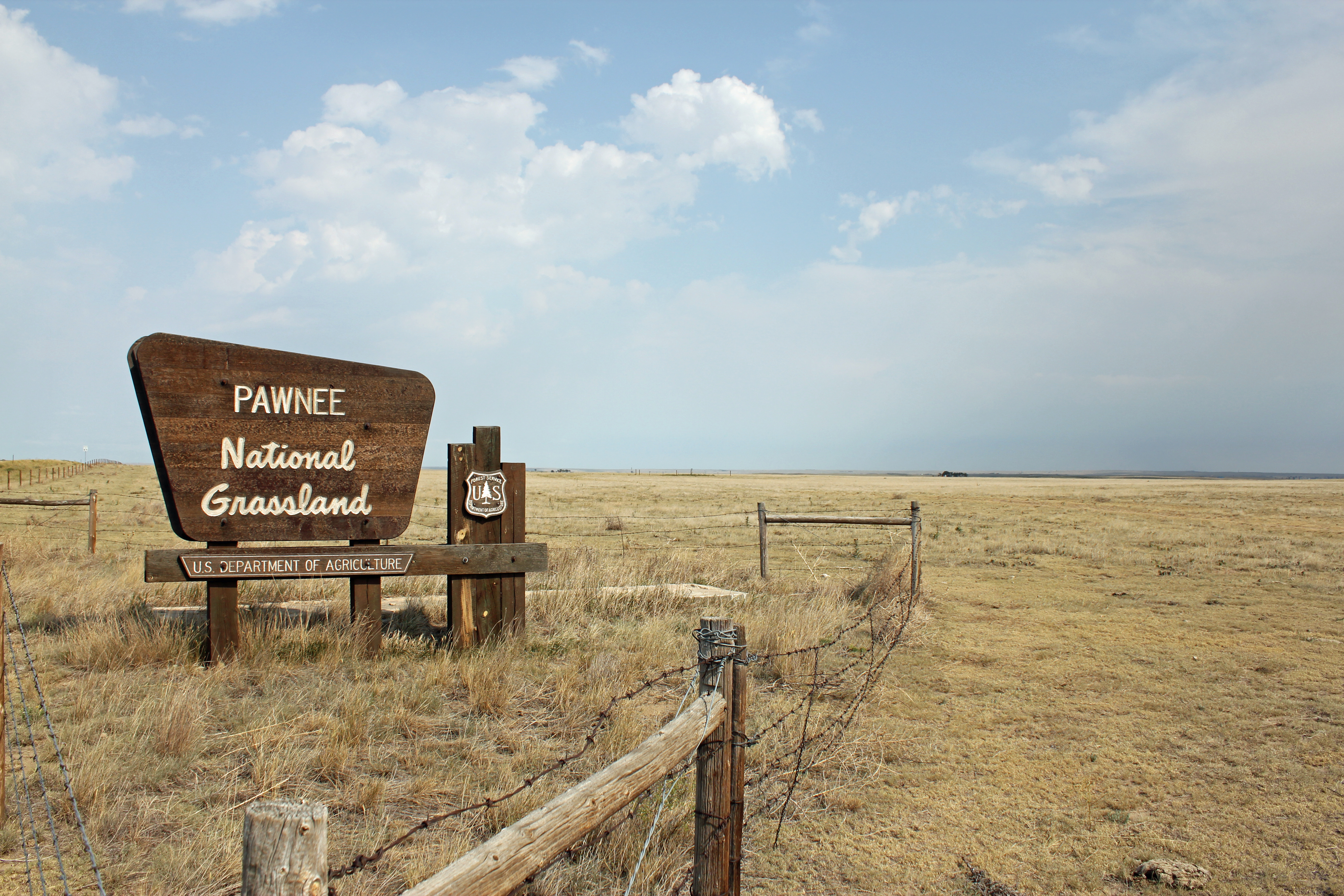
One of the signs marking the entrance to the grassland. This one is at the west side along State Highway 14.

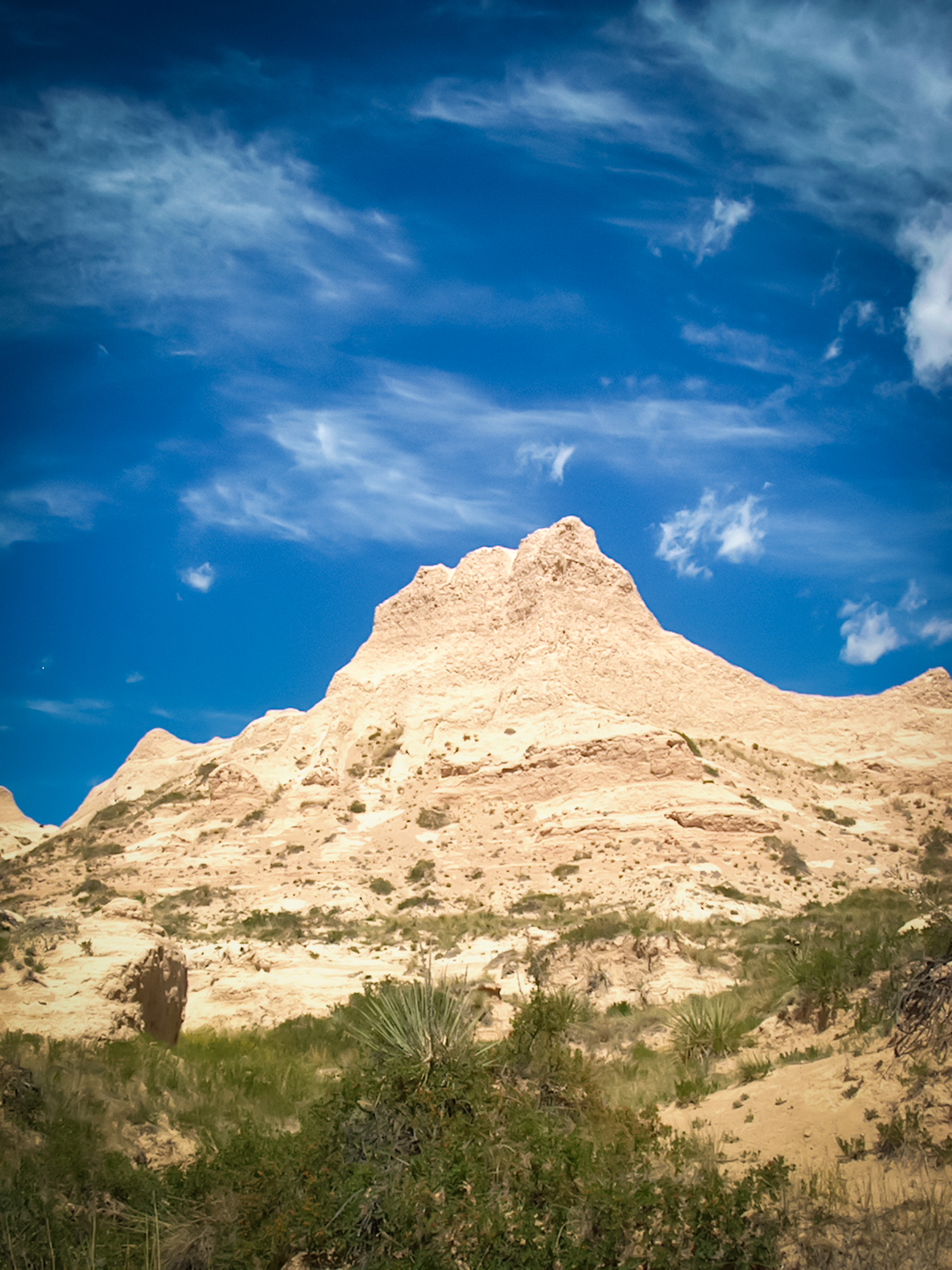
Rock formation near the Pawnee Buttes.

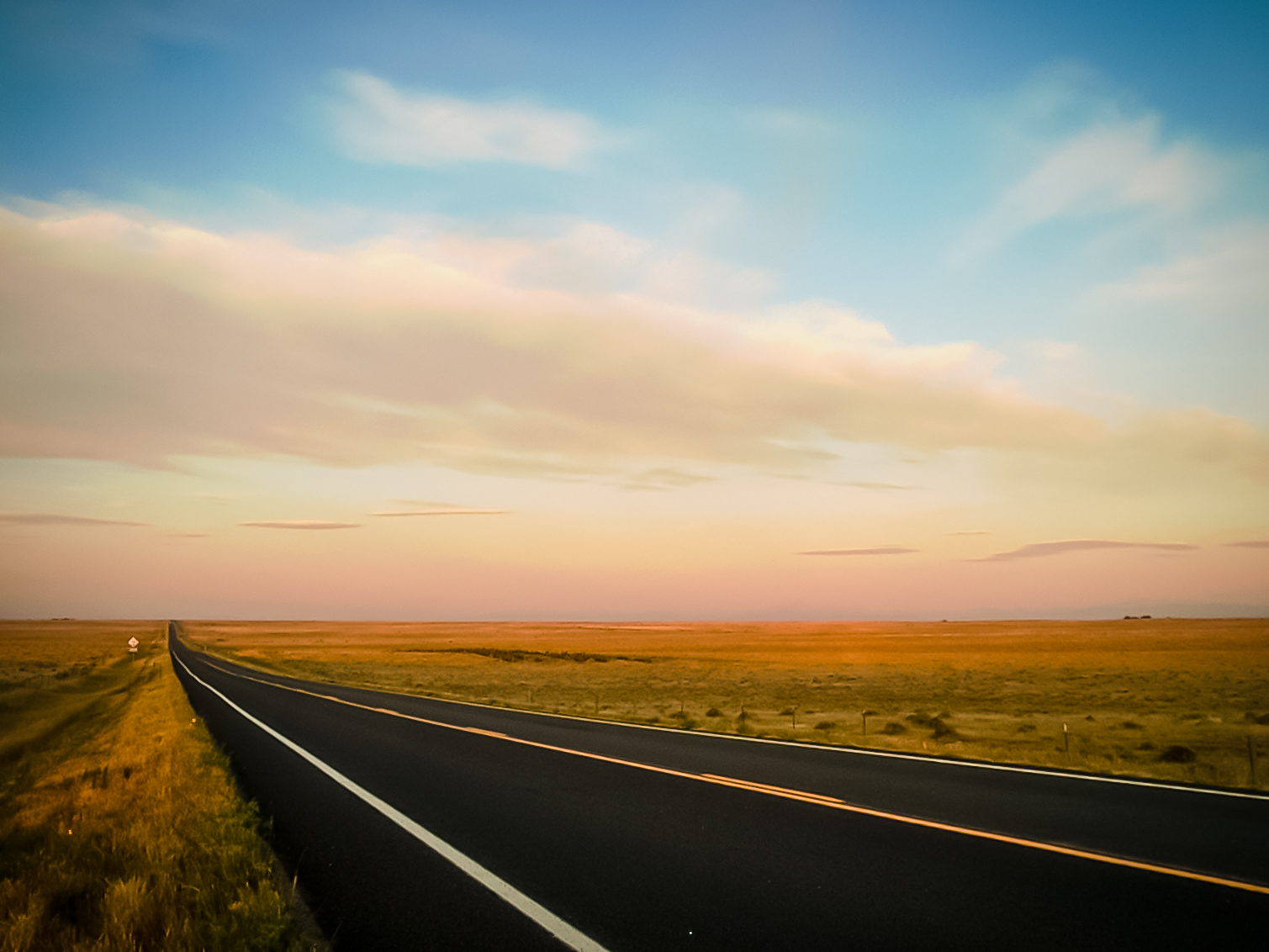
Sunrise over the grassland.

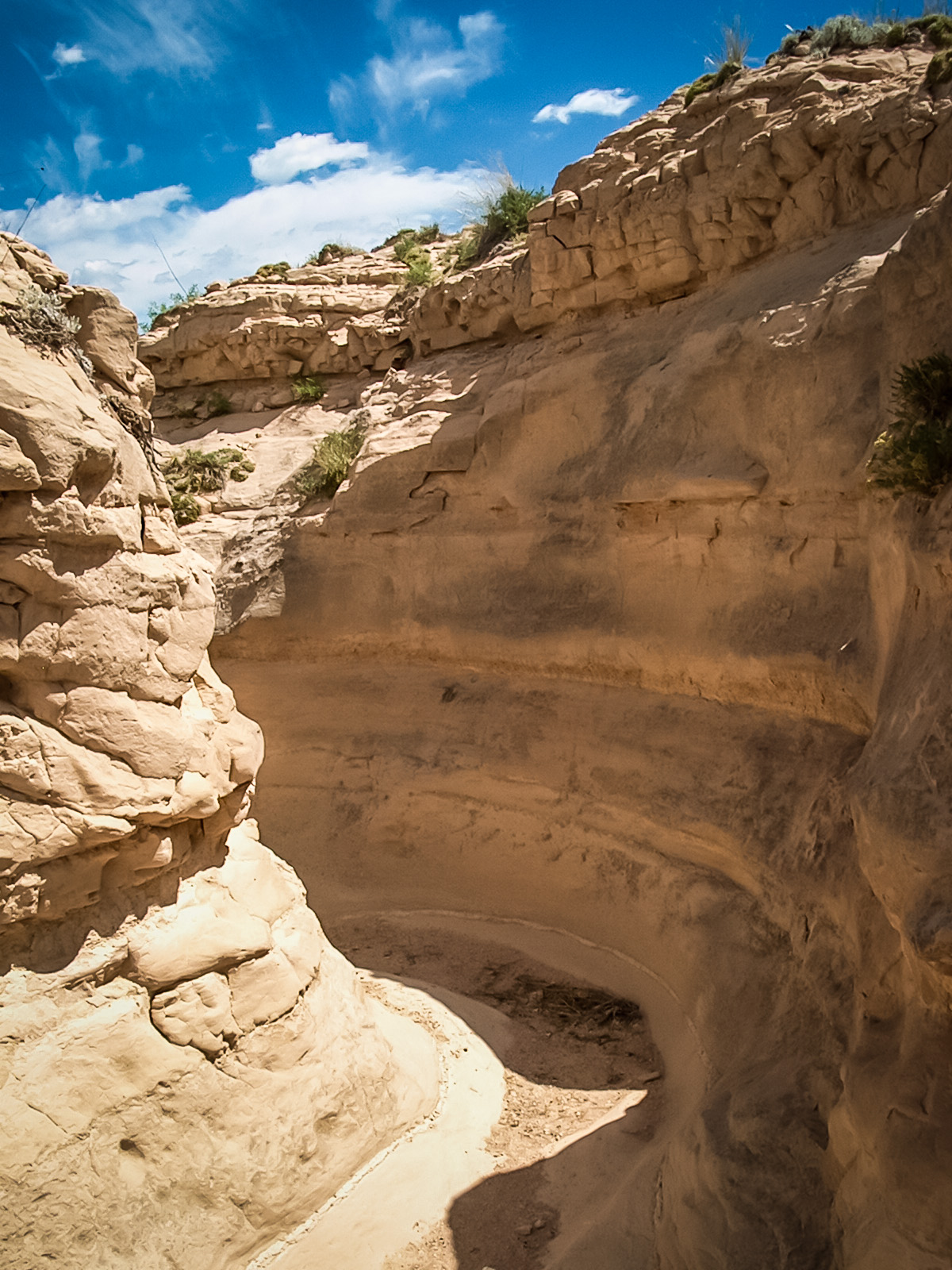
A gully near the Pawnee Buttes.

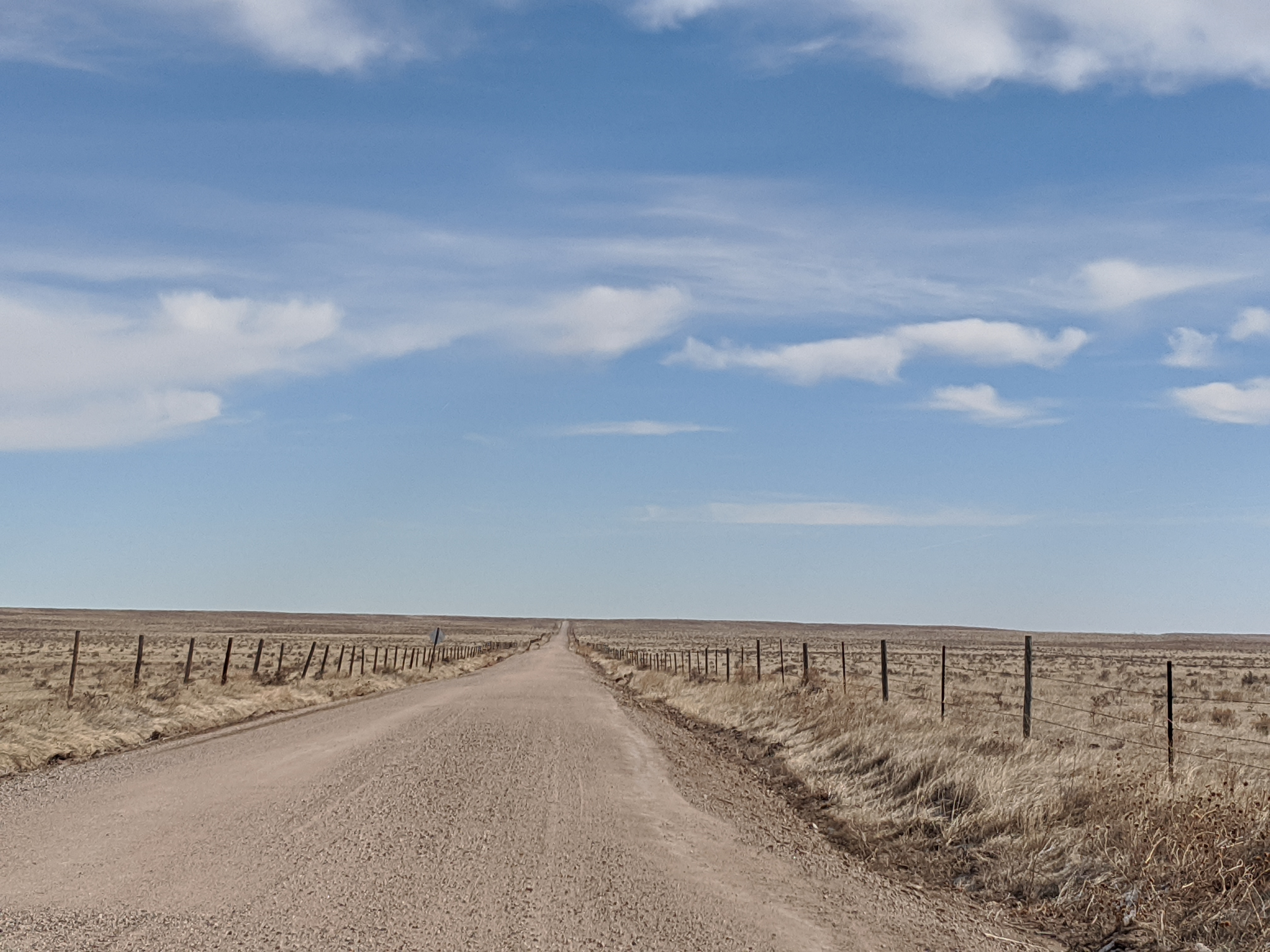
View of Pawnee National Grassland from County Rd 116 in February.

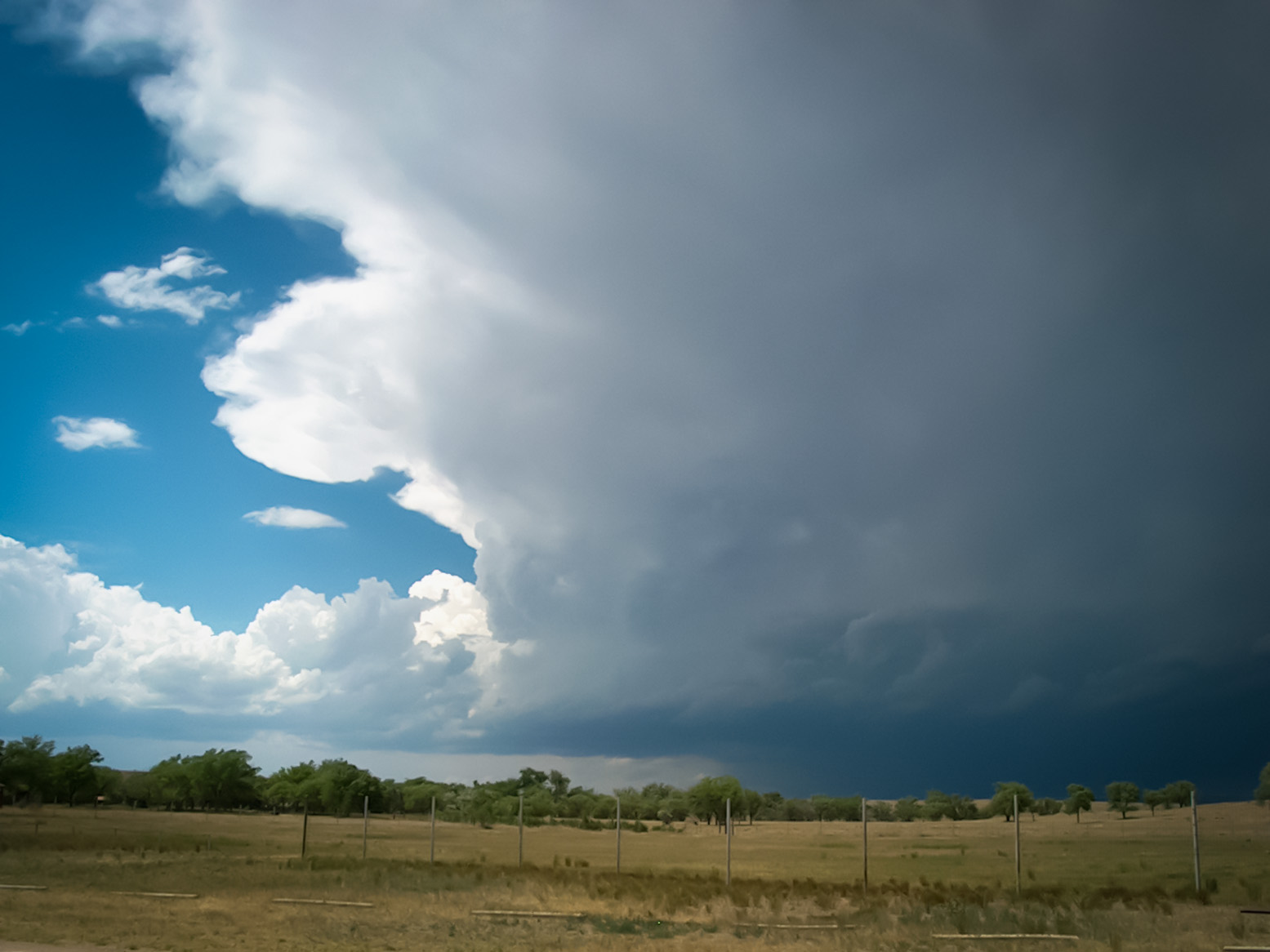
A thundercloud rolling in over the prairie.

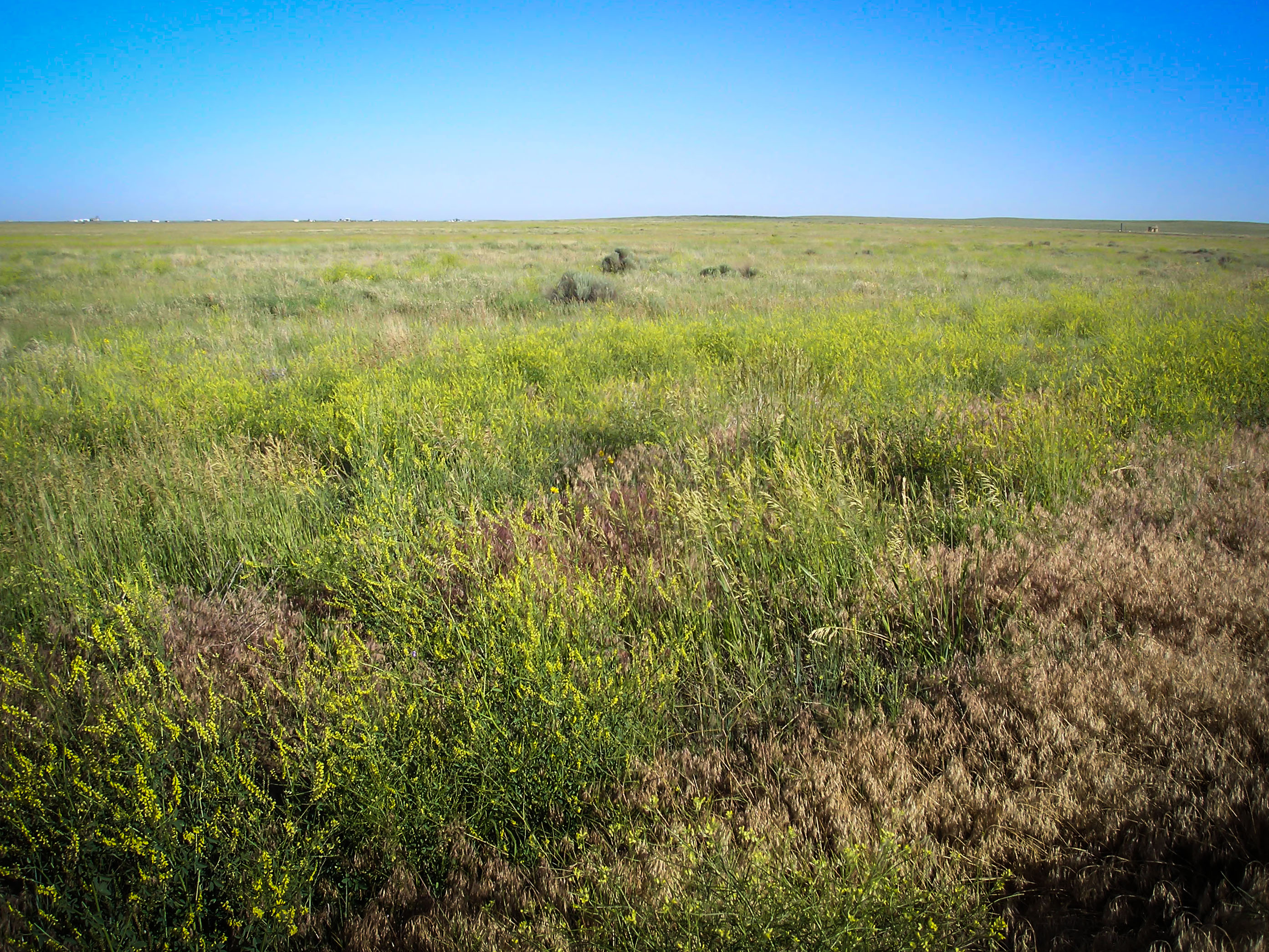
Uninterrupted prairie

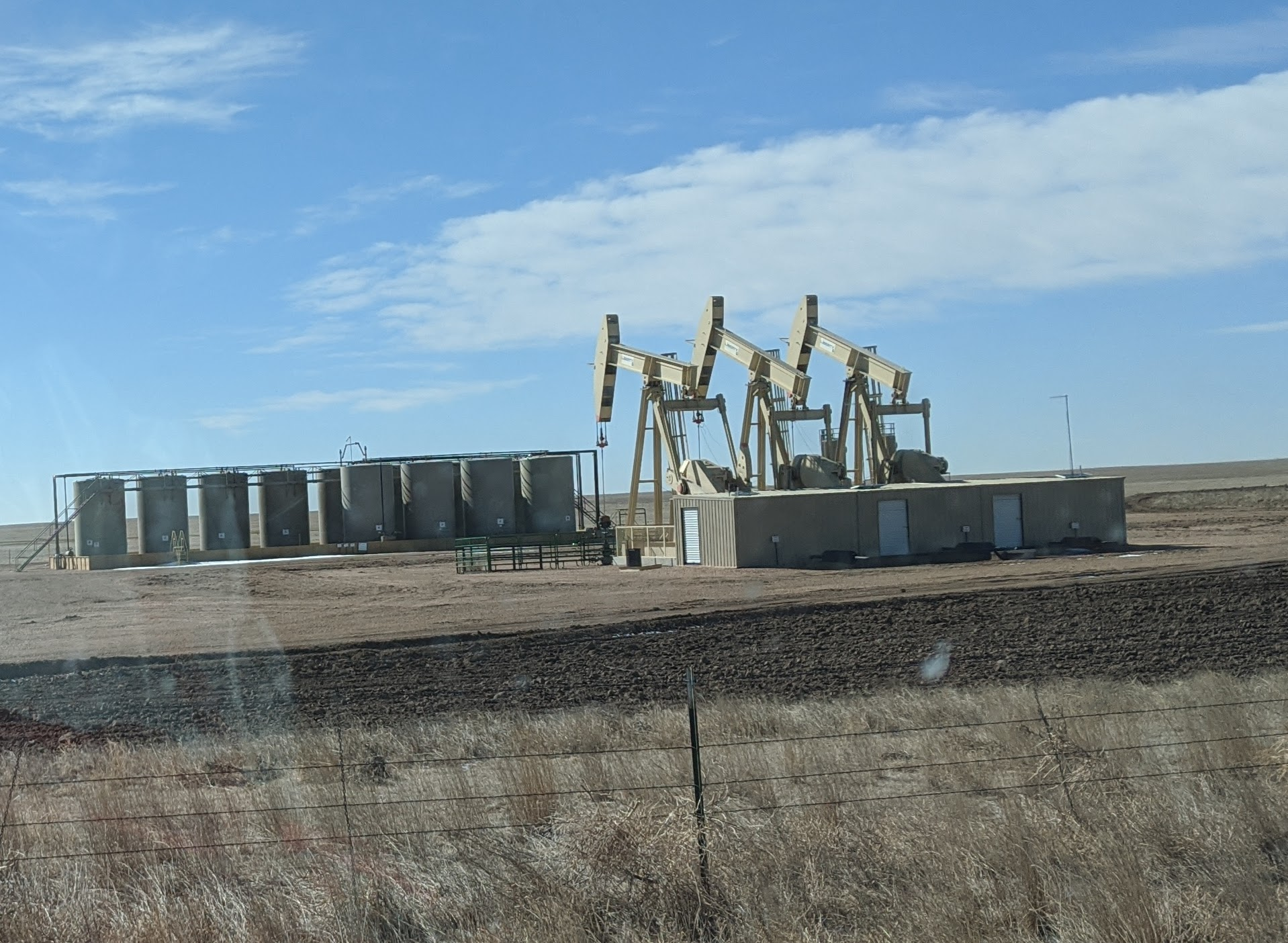
Oil wells on Colorado State Highway 14

== See also ==
- Chalk Bluffs Natural Area
- List of protected grasslands of North America
