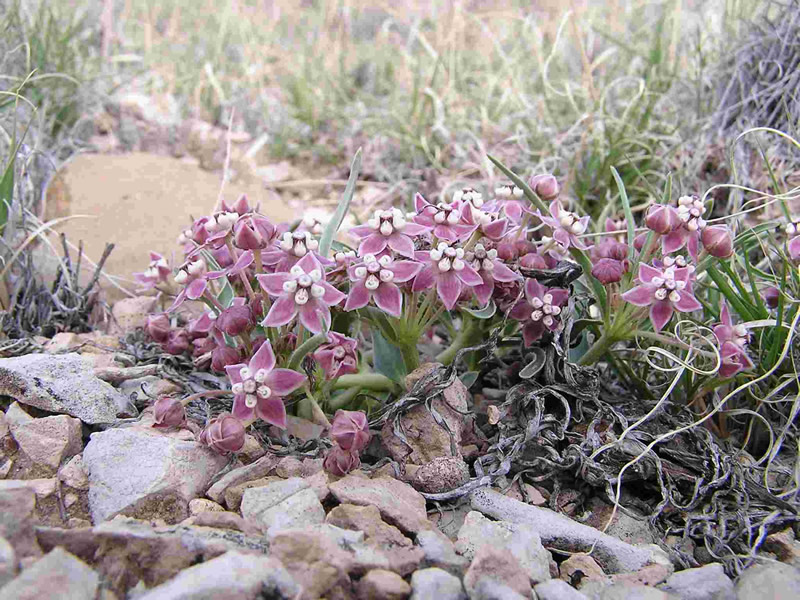

Conservation status
- Vulnerable (NatureServe)

Scientific classification
- Kingdom: Plantae
- Clade: Embryophytes
- Clade: Tracheophytes
- Clade: Angiosperms
- Clade: Eudicots
- Clade: Asterids
- Order: Gentianales
- Family: Apocynaceae
- Genus: Asclepias
- Species: A. uncialis

Binomial name
- Asclepias uncialis Greene

= Asclepias uncialis =

Species of plant

Asclepias uncialis is a species of flowering plant in the dogbane family known by the common name wheel milkweed. It is native to the western United States. Two subspecies are sometimes described, with ssp. ruthiae containing three plants which are sometimes described as separate species, Asclepias ruthiae, A. eastwoodiana, and A. sanjuanensis.

This species is a small perennial herb with stems just a few inches long. Like most other milkweeds, the stems contain a milky sap. There are two different leaf types. The lower leaves are lance-shaped to oval, and the upper leaves are narrower. Flowers occur at the ends of the stems in clusters of up to 12. They are pinkish purple in color. The fruit is a follicle containing seeds which each have a tuft of silky hairs up to an inch long. The plant may be considered "semi-rhizomatous", as what appear to be separate individuals may actually be connected underground by the root crown, which may be up to a foot deep in the soil.

This plant is less common than it was 100 to 150 years ago. It was collected in greater numbers then and appears to have had a larger distribution. There are many historical occurrences that are gone today. There are about 20 occurrences known today.

This plant occurs along the edge of the southern Rocky Mountains in what may be considered the western Great Plains. This distribution generally excludes what is sometimes called ssp. ruthiae, which has a distribution extending west to Nevada. The habitat is mostly shortgrass prairie. The amount of available habitat has declined over the years due to its conversion to agricultural purposes, including rangeland. The land is dominated by grasses, particularly Bouteloua species. Other species include Buchloë dactyloides, Hesperostipa comata, Koeleria macrantha, Pascopyrum smithii, Aristida purpurea, and Sporobolus cryptandrus. There are also shrubs such as the sagebrush Artemisia tridentata. The plant may also be found in grass-dominated parts of pinyon-juniper woodland habitat and other open woodlands. The plants may grow at the bases of large features such as mesas, but they do not occur on rock outcrops or disturbed habitat such as dunes. It is not restricted to any particular soil type.

There are several threats to the species. One is an unknown threat probably related to the plant's biology that is evidenced by its absence in large stretches of appropriate habitat and its absence from an assemblage of surviving native plants. It may have low rates of sexual reproduction.
