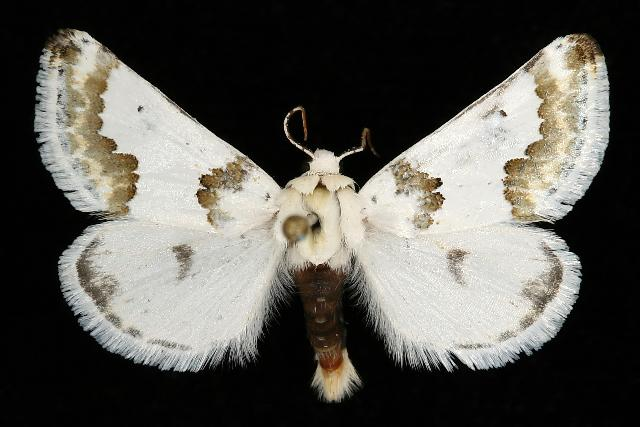

Scientific classification
- Domain: Eukaryota
- Kingdom: Animalia
- Phylum: Arthropoda
- Class: Insecta
- Order: Lepidoptera
- Superfamily: Noctuoidea
- Family: Noctuidae
- Genus: Schinia
- Species: S. cumatilis

Binomial name
- Schinia cumatilis Grote, 1865

= Schinia cumatilis =

Species of moth

Schinia cumatilis, the silver-banded gem, is a species of moth in the family Noctuidae. The species was first described by Augustus Radcliffe Grote in 1865. It is found from the Southwestern United States into Southern Canada.

The wingspan is about 24–27 mm.

The larvae feed on Artemisia frigida.
