= Keota, Colorado =

Keota
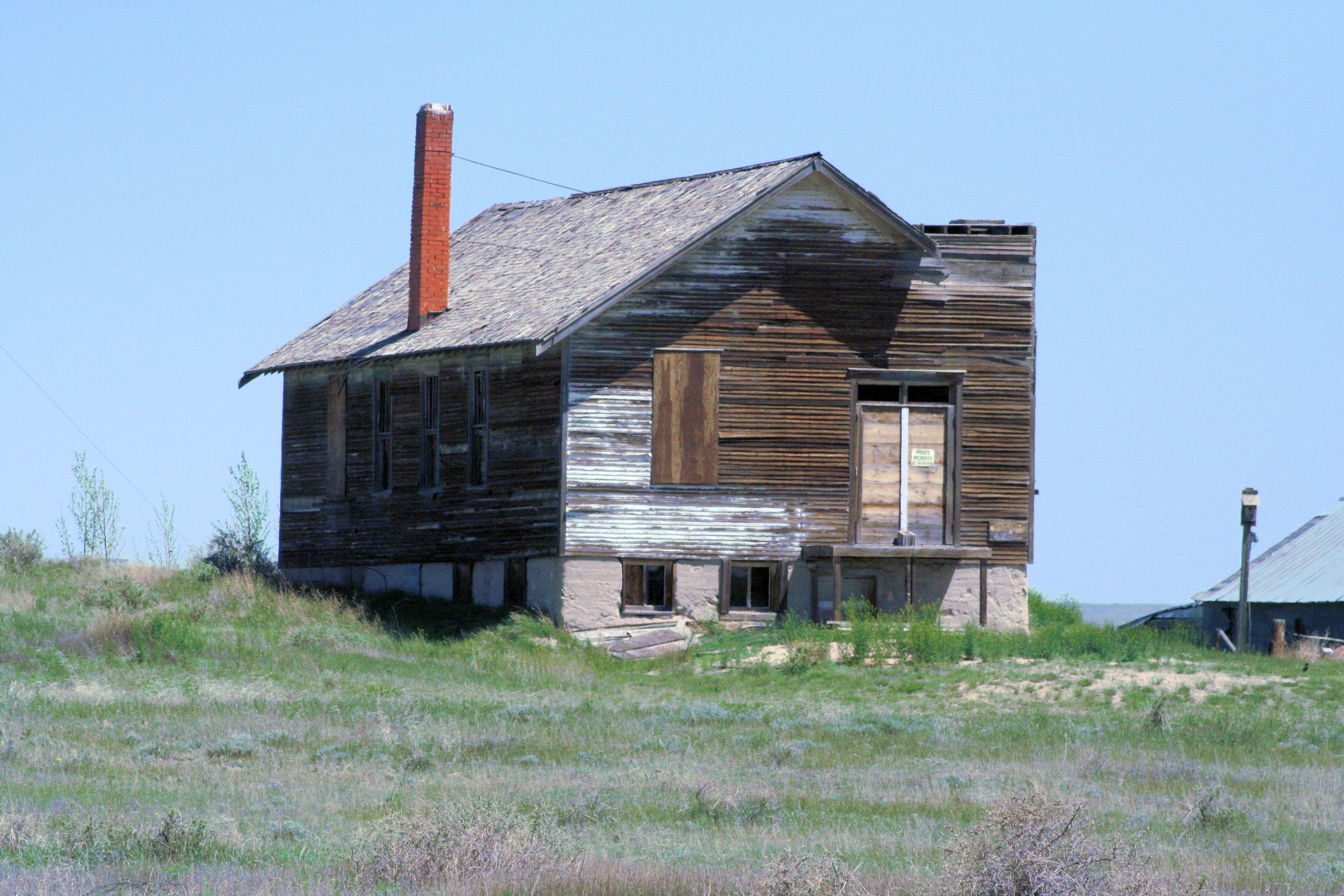
- Remains of the Keota church, 2010

- Location within Colorado
- Coordinates: 40°42′10″N 104°04′31″W
- Country: United States
- State: Colorado
- County: Weld
- Established: 1880
- Elevation: 4,964 ft (1,513 m)
- GNIS place ID: 204690

Keota is a mostly abandoned town located on the prairie in the Pawnee National Grasslands in Weld County in the U.S. state of Colorado.

Keota's elevation is 4,964 ft (1,513 m). Keota is located approximately 50 miles east of Fort Collins on County Road 103. Pawnee Buttes, a pair of prominent sandstone escarpments, which are significant nesting areas for hawks, falcons, and eagles, is located nearby.

== History ==
Keota was established as a homestead in 1880 by two sisters, Mary and Eva Beardsley, and sold to the Lincoln Land and Cattle Co. in 1888. Keota was a station stop on the "Old Prairie Dog Express" of the Burlington & Missouri River Railroad. The railroad was abandoned in 1970, and the track was removed by 1982. The railroad was mainly used for cattle shipping from Cheyenne to Sterling. Keota lost its incorporated status in 1990. There were four different newspapers at four different times from 1908–1975. A post office operated briefly in 1890, was reopened in 1909, and closed in 1974. The school was established in 1888 and closed sometime in 1951. The schoolhouse was torn down sometime in the 1950s, but the foundation still exists. The Dean Bivens family, who maintained the roads, moved out in September 1999.

The town of Line Camp in James A. Michener's novel Centennial ″was drawn from Keota.″

=== Present habitation ===
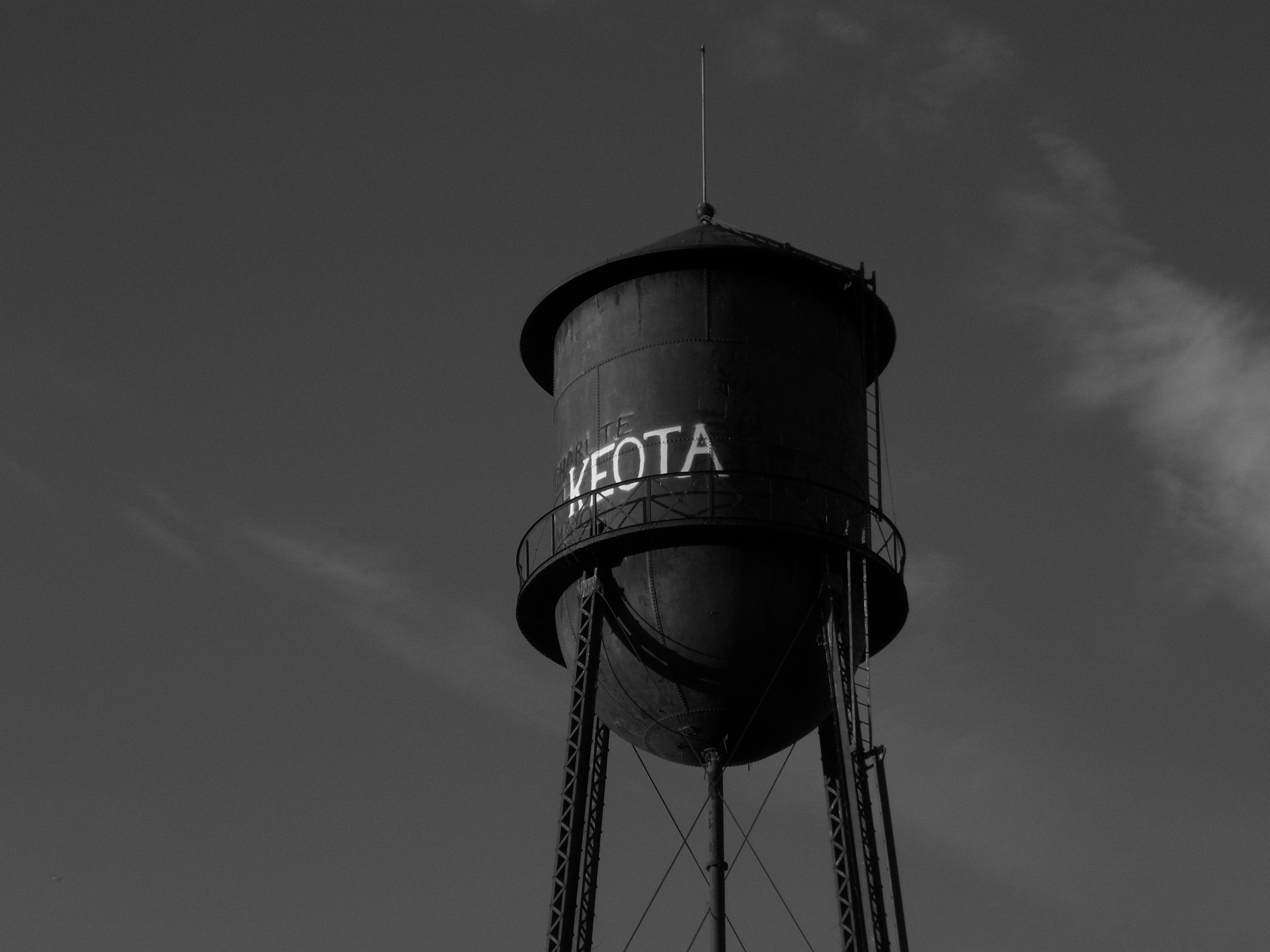
Keota water tower

As of 2008, the town is home to several residents in modern houses surrounding the historic townsite. There are remains of the general store, several houses, and foundations on what was the north side of the town along with several foundations, including that of the previously mentioned schoolhouse.

=== Water supply ===
The Keota water tower still stands to this day; however, it is not in operation and would likely no longer be safe for storage of public drinking water. Water was once brought to Keota via rail cars due to its isolated location on Colorado's eastern plains.
