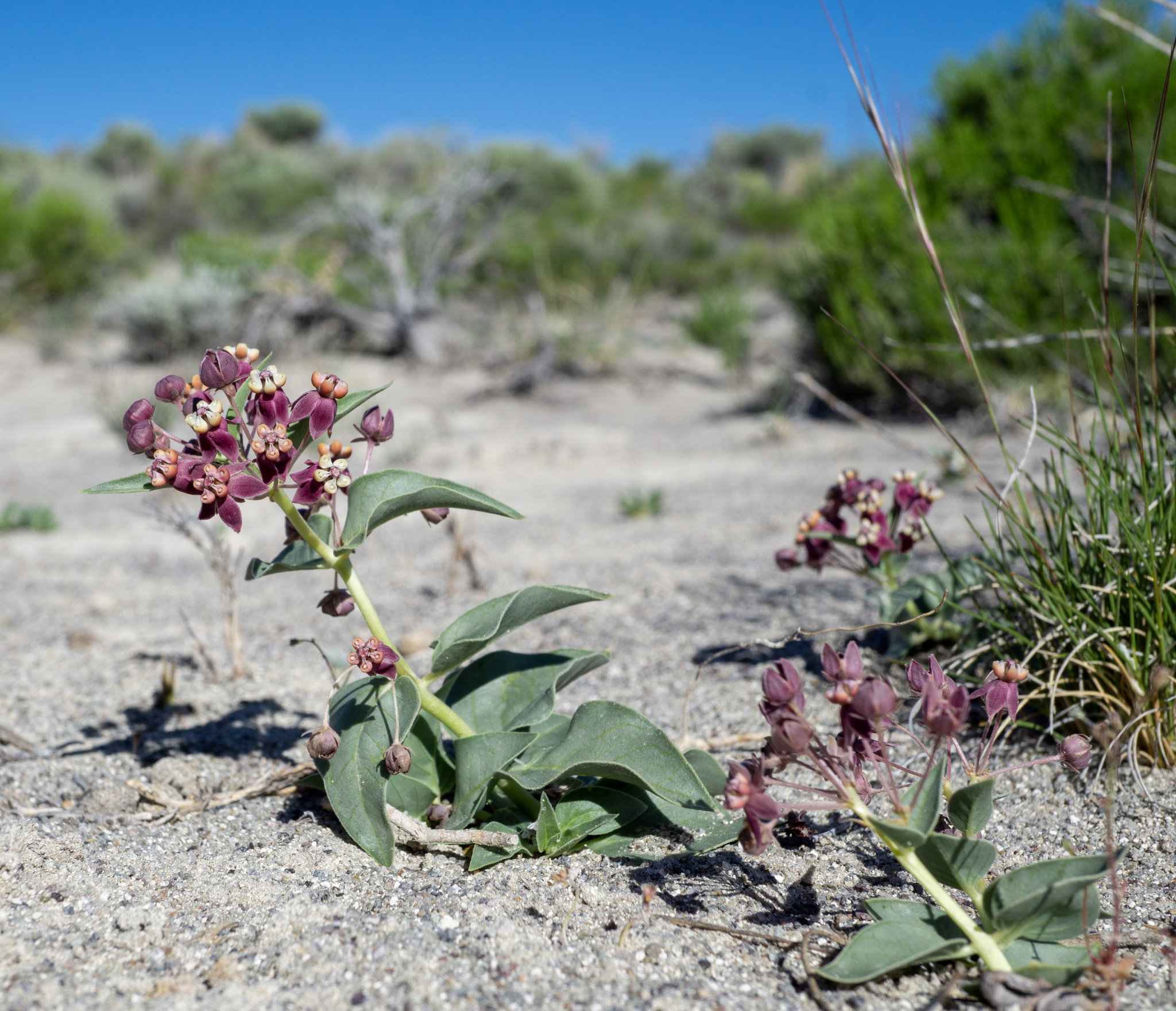

Conservation status
- Imperiled (NatureServe)

Scientific classification
- Kingdom: Plantae
- Clade: Embryophytes
- Clade: Tracheophytes
- Clade: Angiosperms
- Clade: Eudicots
- Clade: Asterids
- Order: Gentianales
- Family: Apocynaceae
- Genus: Asclepias
- Species: A. eastwoodiana

Binomial name
- Asclepias eastwoodiana Barneby

= Asclepias eastwoodiana =

Eastwood's Milkweed

Species of flowering plant from Nevada

Asclepias eastwoodiana, commonly called Eastwood's milkweed, is a species of dwarf milkweed endemic to Nevada. Its conservation status is G2 (Imperiled). Asclepias eastwoodiana is endemic to Nevada, and most observations are within central Nevada. This plant grows in conifer woodlands, shrubland/chaparral, grasslands, and desert habitats, and at elevations of 1,400–2,200 m (4,600–7,200 ft). Asclepias eastwoodiana is a perennial, and flowers in May through June, and fruits in June.
