= Chalk Bluffs Natural Area =

Chalk encarpment in Colorado, United States

Coordinates: 36.47952°N 90.16252°W

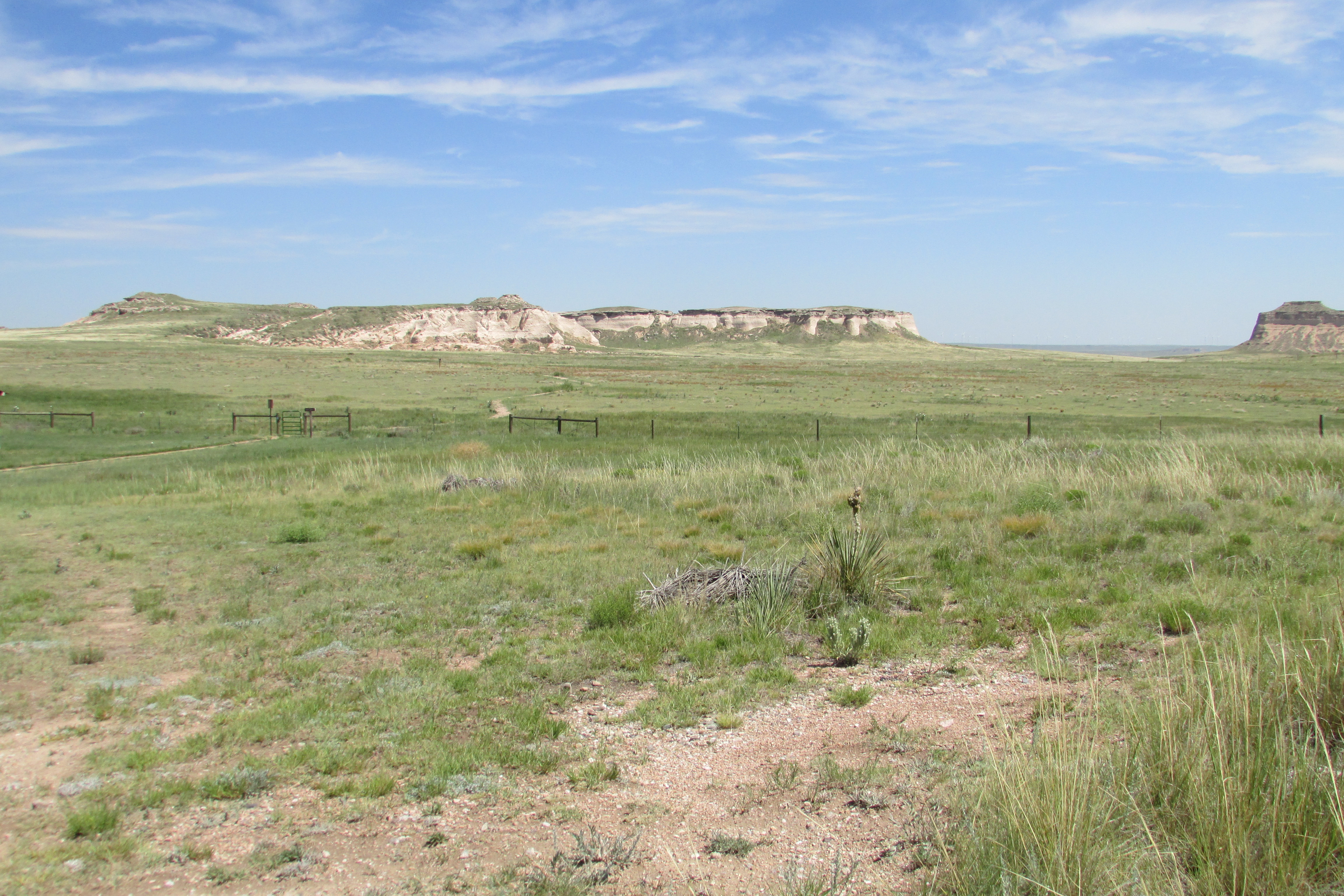
Chalk Bluffs in the Pawnee National Grasslands, Weld County, Colorado

The Chalk Bluffs is a barren chalk escarpment in the northeastern part of the U.S. state of Colorado, stretching from the Wyoming border east of I-25 to near the South Platte River in Logan County and Weld County.

== Geology ==
The Chalk Bluffs exposes the Ogallala, Fox Hills and Arikaree Formations. Miocene, Eocene and Paleocene vertebrate fossils are found.

== Ecology ==
Most of the escarpment lies within the Pawnee National Grasslands.

The bluffs are primarily barren and protected from fire. However, trees normally found in the foothills of the Rocky Mountains are found there, including Ponderosa pine, Rocky Mountain juniper, limber pine, and mountain mahogany.

Numerous raptors nest on the cliffs including Swainson's hawks, ferruginous hawks, golden eagles, and prairie falcons. The bluffs are a favorite site for birdwatching. It has been recognized by the National Audubon Society as a site of "global importance".

== Chalk Bluffs Natural Area ==
A 640-acre (2.6 km^{2}) portion of the Chalk Bluffs in Weld County was set aside in September 2001 by the Colorado State Parks Natural Areas Program as the Chalk Bluffs Natural Area.

== Wind farm ==
The bluffs are adjacent to the Cedar Creek Wind Farm.
