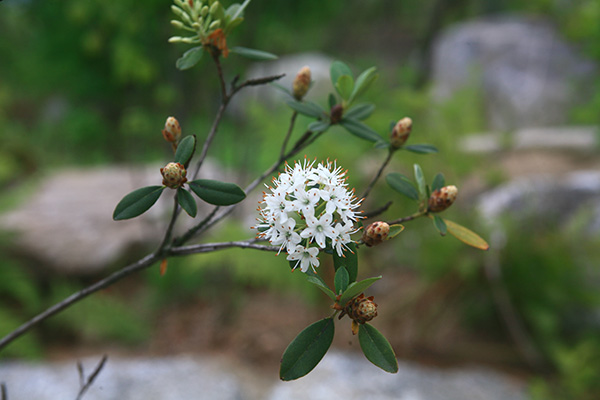

Scientific classification
- Kingdom: Plantae
- Clade: Tracheophytes
- Clade: Angiosperms
- Clade: Eudicots
- Clade: Asterids
- Order: Ericales
- Family: Ericaceae
- Genus: Rhododendron
- Species: R. micranthum

Binomial name
- Rhododendron micranthum Turcz.

Synonyms
- Rhododendron pritzelianum Diels; Rhododendron rosthornii Diels

= Rhododendron micranthum =

Species of plant

Rhododendron micranthum (照山白) is a rhododendron species native to China and Korea, where it grows at altitudes of 1,000–3,000 m (3,300–9,800 ft). It is an evergreen shrub that grows to 2.5 m (8.2 ft) in height, with leaves that are oblanceolate, oblong-elliptic, to lanceolate, 3–4 by 9–12 cm in size. Flowers are white.
