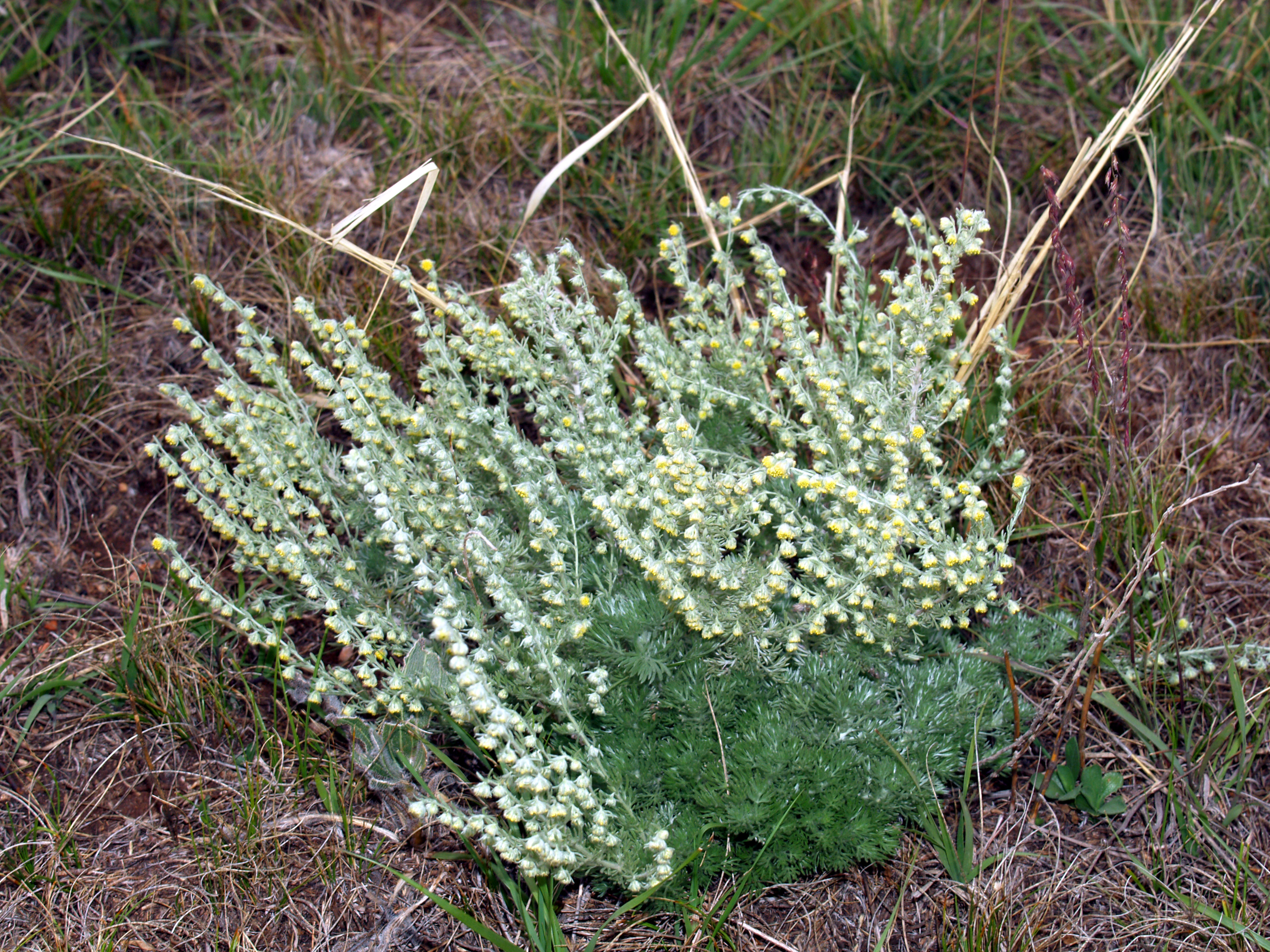

Conservation status
- Secure (NatureServe)

Scientific classification
- Kingdom: Plantae
- Clade: Tracheophytes
- Clade: Angiosperms
- Clade: Eudicots
- Clade: Asterids
- Order: Asterales
- Family: Asteraceae
- Genus: Artemisia
- Species: A. frigida

Binomial name
- Artemisia frigida Willd.

= Artemisia frigida =

Species of flowering plant

Artemisia frigida is a widespread species of flowering plant in the family Asteraceae. It is native to Europe, Asia, and much of North America. In parts of the north-central and northeastern United States it is an introduced species.

== Names ==
Common names include fringed sagebrush, prairie sagewort, arctic sage and pasture sage. The plant is not, however, closely related to the true sages Salvia.

In the Zuni language this plant is called to'shoeha'chikĭa, meaning "seeds leaf sweet".

== Description ==
Artemisia frigida is a perennial plant with a woody base. The stems spread out, generally forming a mat or clump up to 40 centimetres (1.3 ft) tall. The stems are covered in lobed gray-green leaves which are coated in silvery hairs. The inflorescence contains many spherical flower heads each about half a centimeter wide and lined with woolly-haired, gray-green or brownish phyllaries. The flower heads contain several pistillate ray florets and many bisexual disc florets. The plant is aromatic, with a strong scent. This plant can make a great many seeds. It can also spread by layering; in some years it produces very few seeds.

Artemisia frigida is common and dominant or codominant in many areas, especially in dry and disturbed habitat types. It is common in the Rocky Mountains and Great Plains in North America, where it occurs in grasslands, shrublands, and woodlands, among others. It has a tendency to increase in areas that have been heavily grazed by livestock. Overgrowth of the plant is sometimes an indicator of overgrazing on rangeland. It sometimes becomes an aggressive weed. Ranchers have considered the plant to be both an adequate forage species and a worthless nuisance species. Artemisia frigida's common name is wild sage. Sometimes known as prairie sage and sagewort.

== Cultivation ==
Artemisia frigida is cultivated for its foliage effects, and has gained the Royal Horticultural Society's Award of Garden Merit. The wildflower cultivation author Claude A. Barr expressed the opinion that it and Artemisia longifolia were the only two species of Artemisia that could be safely taken into a garden. The other species such as Artemisia tridentata, being too aggressive in spreading.

Artemisia frigida is also used in landscaping and for erosion control and revegetation of rangeland. It is drought-resistant.

== Ecology and uses ==
A number of wild animals consume the plant, including white-tailed jackrabbits and sage grouse.

Artemisia frigida has a variety of uses for Indigenous peoples of North America. It is used medicinally for coughs, colds, wounds, and heartburn by the Blackfoot. The Cree people use it for headache and fever and the Tewa people took it for gastritis and indigestion. It also has ceremonial and veterinary applications, including for the Blackfoot, who reportedly used the crushed leaves to "revive gophers after children clubbed them while playing a game". Among the Zuni, the whole plant is made into an infusion for colds. Sprigs of this plant and corn ears are attached to decorated tablets and carried by female dancers in a drama. The sprigs are also dipped in water and planted with corn so the corn will grow abundantly.

Mongol herders from the Bairin Right Banner and Bairin Left Banner of Inner Mongolia prepare a water-based decoction using fresh or dried Artemisia frigida with Sabina vulgaris, Sanguisorba officinalis, Rhododendron micranthum, and Ephedra sinica to treat joint pain.
