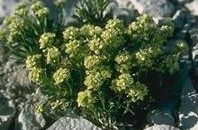

Conservation status
- Critically Imperiled (NatureServe)

Scientific classification
- Kingdom: Plantae
- Clade: Tracheophytes
- Clade: Angiosperms
- Clade: Eudicots
- Clade: Rosids
- Order: Brassicales
- Family: Brassicaceae
- Genus: Lepidium
- Species: L. barnebyanum

Binomial name
- Lepidium barnebyanum Reveal

= Lepidium barnebyanum =

Species of flowering plant

Lepidium barnebyanum is a rare species of flowering plant in the family Brassicaceae known by the common names Barneby's pepperweed, Barneby's pepper-grass, and Barneby's ridge-cress. It is endemic to Utah, where there is a single population in Duchesne County. It is a federally listed endangered species of the United States.

This is a clumpy perennial herb with a woody caudex at the base layered with new leaves and the remains of previous seasons' leaves. The stems grow less than 20 centimeters tall. The leaves are linear in shape and one half centimeter to eight centimeters in length. Most are at the caudex and there are a few smaller ones higher on the stems. The inflorescence is a raceme of many white, cream, or yellowish flowers. Blooming occurs in April and May through June.

This plant grows in pinyon-juniper woodland and desert scrub on rock outcrops in white shale formations. There are petroleum deposits under the rock. Common plants in the area include Colorado Pinyon (Pinus edulis), Utah juniper (Juniperus osteosperma), Hooker's sandwort (Arenaria hookeri), spiny phlox (Phlox hoodii), Colorado feverfew (Parthenium ligulatum), large-flowered goldenweed (Haplopappus armerioides), stemless hymenoxys (Hymenoxys acaulis), Bateman's buckwheat (Eriogonum batemanii), and table Townsend daisy (Townsendia mensana).

There is one known population of this plant containing about 5000 individuals. The population occurs on a shale substrate that is popular with off-road vehicle enthusiasts whose vehicles damage the habitat. Petroleum exploration is also a threat.
