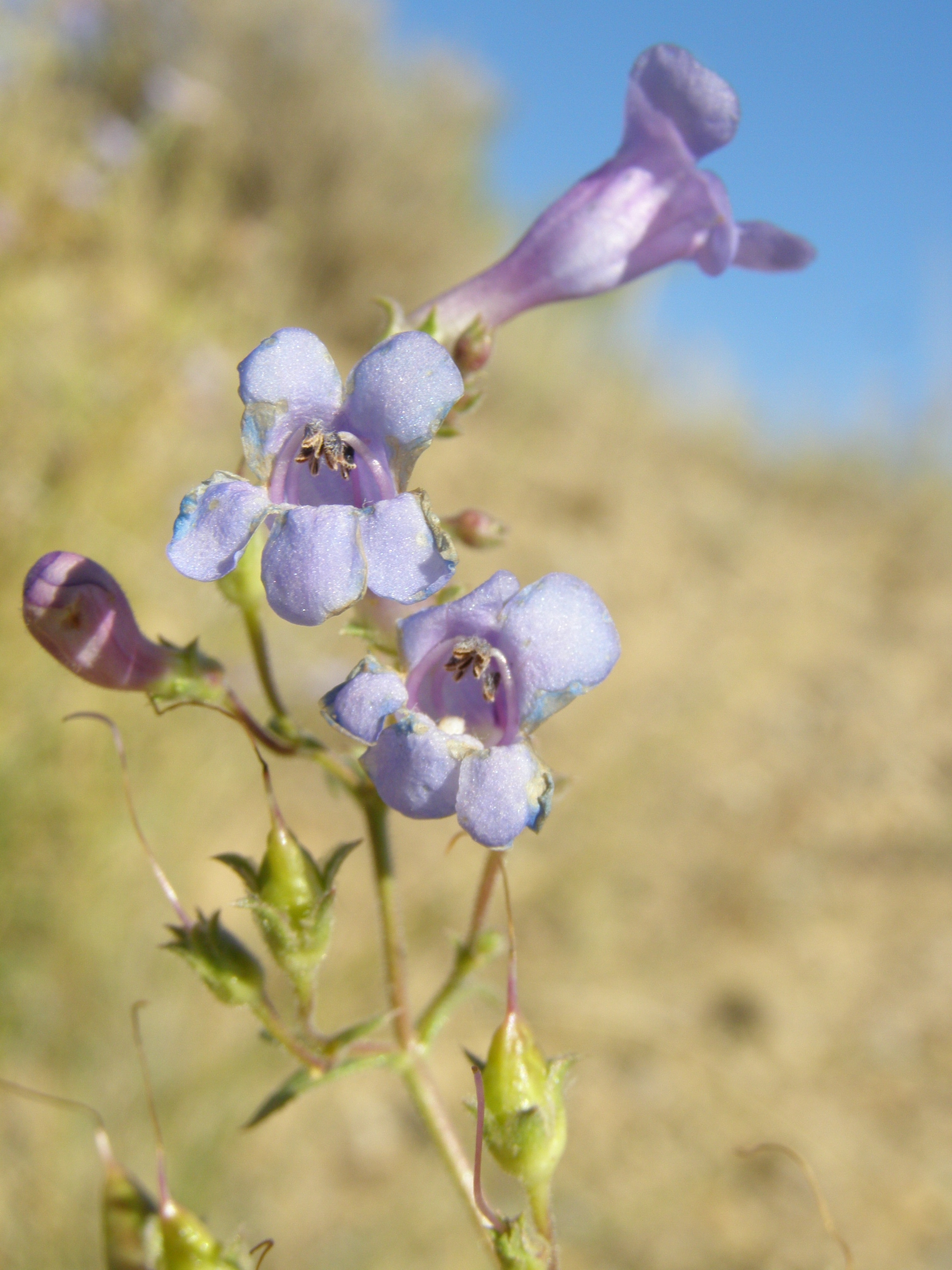

Conservation status
- Critically Imperiled (NatureServe)

Scientific classification
- Kingdom: Plantae
- Clade: Tracheophytes
- Clade: Angiosperms
- Clade: Eudicots
- Clade: Asterids
- Order: Lamiales
- Family: Plantaginaceae
- Genus: Penstemon
- Species: P. gibbensii

Binomial name
- Penstemon gibbensii Dorn

= Penstemon gibbensii =

Species of flowering plant

Penstemon gibbensii is a species of flowering plant in the plantain family known by the common name Gibbens' beardtongue. It is native to the western United States, where it occurs in Wyoming, Colorado, and Utah.

This species grows up to 20 centimeters tall. It has linear or lance-shaped leaves oppositely arranged on the stems, the longest reaching 9 centimeters in length. The tubular blue flowers are up to 2 centimeters long. Blooming occurs in June through September, typically in response to adequate moisture.

There are a total of nine known occurrences in three US states. The species is limited to a specific type of soil, shale and sandy clay originating from the Browns Park Formation, a geological formation. The soil is yellowish and rich in selenium. The habitat is pinyon-juniper woodland, sagebrush, and greasewood-saltbush. Associated species include Chrysothamnus sp., Oxytropis nana var. obnapaformis, Eriogonum sp., Wyethia scabra, Commandra umbellata, and Leptodactylon sp.

The main threat to the species is grazing by livestock and other animals. Other threats include oil and gas exploration, off-road vehicle activity, and introduced species of plants. The plants may die in drought conditions, as well.
