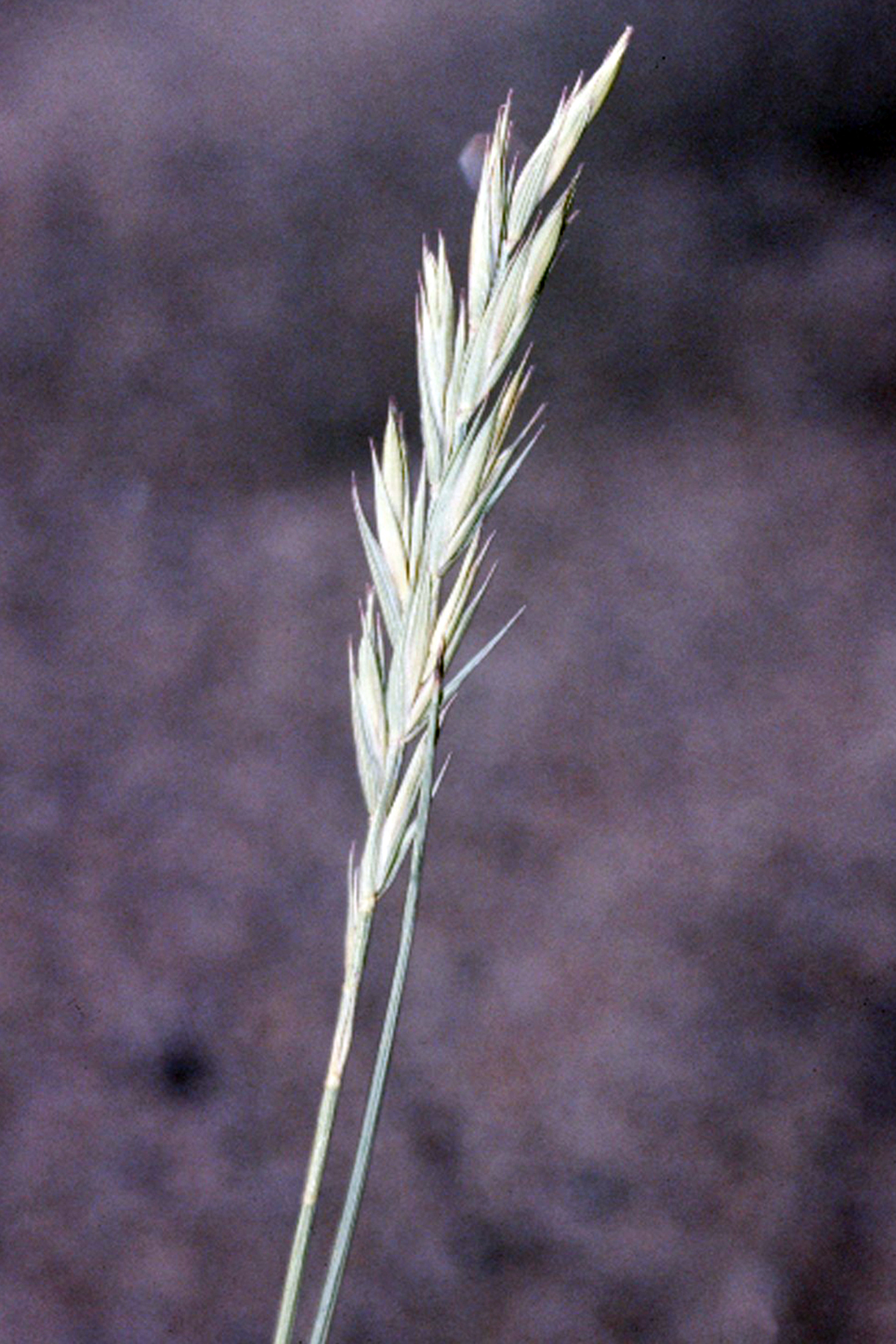

Scientific classification
- Kingdom: Plantae
- Clade: Tracheophytes
- Clade: Angiosperms
- Clade: Monocots
- Clade: Commelinids
- Order: Poales
- Family: Poaceae
- Subfamily: Pooideae
- Supertribe: Triticodae
- Tribe: Triticeae
- Genus: Pascopyrum; Á.Löve
- Species: P. smithii

Binomial name
- Pascopyrum smithii (Rydb.) Á.Löve

= Pascopyrum =

Genus of grass

Pascopyrum is a monotypic genus of grass containing the sole species Pascopyrum smithii, which is known by the common names western wheatgrass and red-joint wheatgrass, after the red coloration of the nodes. It is native to North America.

== Distribution ==
This is a sod-forming rhizomatous perennial grass which is native and common throughout most of North America. It grows in grassland and prairie in the Great Plains, where it is sometimes the dominant grass species. It is the state grass of North Dakota, South Dakota, and Wyoming.

== Ecology ==
It is a valuable forage for animals such as bison and black-tailed prairie dogs, and it is good for grazing livestock. It is used for revegetation of disturbed and overgrazed habitat, and many cultivars have been developed to suit various conditions, including low-maintenance lawns. Wheatgrass generally tolerates mowing to four inches, but does not tolerate shade. Healthy stands may crowd out other species, making it more suitable for monoculture plantings.

== Potential phytoremediation ==
Pascopyrum smithii has been genetically modified with bacterial genes to degrade RDX and detoxify TNT, explosives commonly found on military ranges. These engineered plants outperform wild-types in removing contaminants and resisting toxicity. This marks the first successful transformation of this species for sustainable cleanup of explosive residues.
