= Watrous (surname) =

Watrous is a surname. Notable people with the surname include:

- Al Watrous (1899–1983), American golfer
- Ansel Watrous (1835–1927), American newspaper editor and historian
- Bill Watrous (1939–2018), American jazz trombonist
- Daniel Watrous, American settler, lawyer, and politician
- Harry W. Watrous (1857–1940), American painter
- Hazel Watrous (1888–1954), American writer
- James Watrous (1908–1999), American painter
- Jerome Anthony Watrous (1840–1922), American author, soldier, newspaper editor, and politician
- John Watrous (disambiguation), multiple people
- Malena Watrous, American writer and educator
- Mark Watrous, American musician and graphic/video artist
- Rick Watrous (born 1952), American politician
- William Frisbie Watrous (1825–1910), American fruit farmer, pioneer, and politician
