= Watrous =

Watrous may refer to:

- Watrous (surname)
- Watrous, Saskatchewan, a town in Canada
  - Arm River-Watrous, an electoral district in Saskatchewan
  - Humboldt-Watrous, an electoral district in Saskatchewan
  - Watrous (former electoral district) in Saskatchewan
  - Watrous Formation, a stratigraphical unit
  - Watrous railway station
  - Watrous Airport
- Watrous, New Mexico, a community in the United States
  - Watrous (La Junta), historic site and U.S. National Historic Landmark
