= Benjamin Eaton =

Benjamin Eaton may refer to:

- Benjamin Harrison Eaton (1833–1904), Governor of Colorado
- Benjamin S. Eaton, land developer in Los Angeles County
