= Governor Eaton =

Governor Eaton may refer to:

- Benjamin Harrison Eaton (1833–1904), 4th Governor of Colorado
- Horace Eaton (1804–1855), 18th Governor of Vermont
- John Eaton (politician) (1790–1856), Governor of Florida Territory
- Theophilus Eaton (died 1658), Governor of the New Haven Colony from 1639 to 1658

== See also ==
- Governor Easton (disambiguation)
