= Eaton School District =

School district in Colorado, United States

Address
- 211 1st Street Eaton, Colorado, 80615; United States
- Coordinates: 40°31′34″N 104°42′48″W

District information
- Type: Unified school district
- Motto: Our Business is Children!
- Grades: K–12
- Superintendent: Jay Tapia
- School board: 5 members
- Chair of the board: Brad Sharp
- Schools: 3 elementary, 1 middle, 1 high
- Budget: $34,956,000
- NCES District ID: 0803600

Students and staff
- Students: 2,007
- Teachers: 129.88 (on an FTE basis)
- Staff: 245.97 (on an FTE basis)
- Student–teacher ratio: 15.45
- District mascot: Reds
- Colors: Red and white

Other information
- Website: www.eaton.k12.co.us

The Eaton School District, officially known as Eaton School District RE-2, is a rural unified school district headquartered in Eaton, Colorado. It serves west central Weld County, including Eaton and Galeton.

== Schools ==
- Eaton High School
- Eaton Middle School
- Benjamin Eaton Elementary School
- Eaton Elementary School
- Galeton Elementary School
