= Governor Easton =

Governor Easton may refer to:

- John Easton (1624–1705), 15th Governor of the Colony of Rhode Island and Providence Plantations from 1690 to 1695
- Nicholas Easton (1593–1675), 4th Governor of the Colony of Rhode Island and Providence Plantations from 1672 to 1674

== See also ==
- Governor Eaton (disambiguation)
