= Austin Ekeler =

American football player (born 1995)

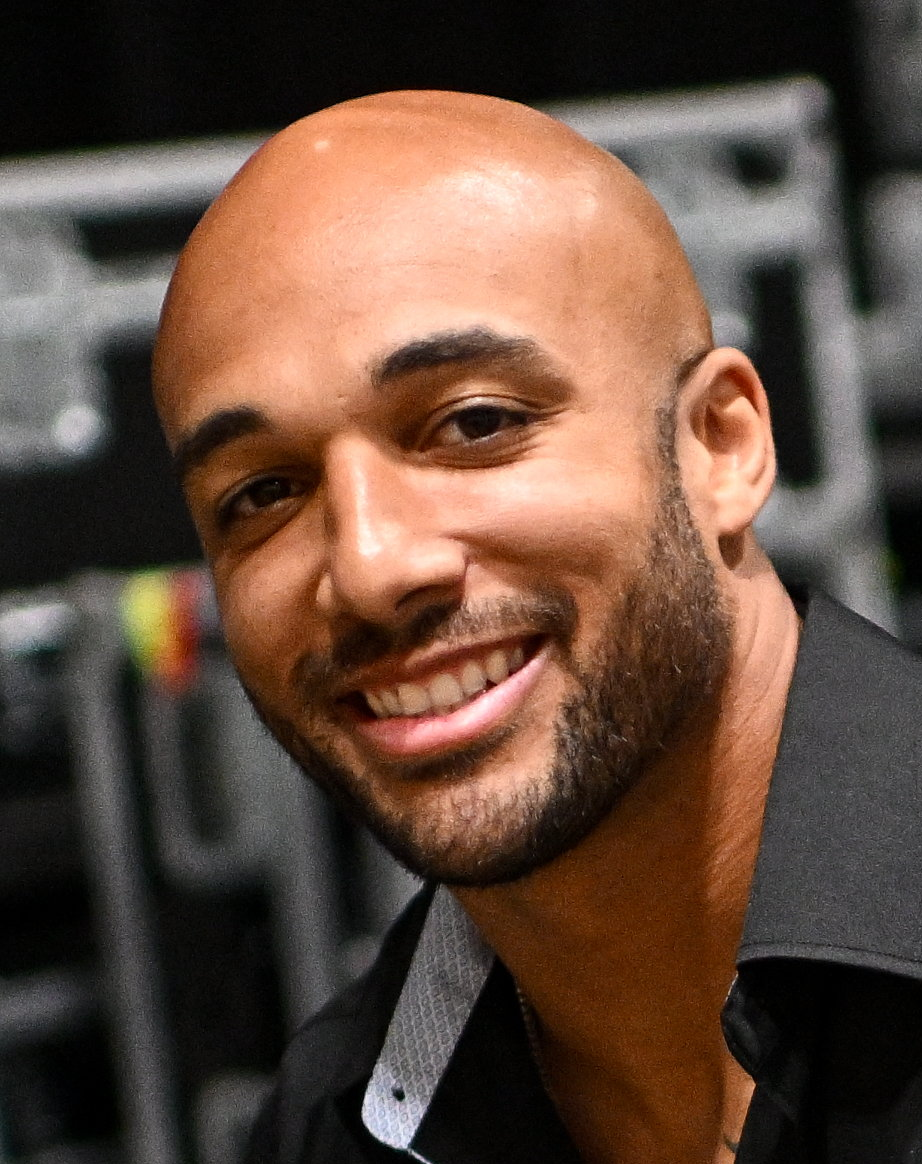
- Ekeler in 2024

No. 30 – Washington Commanders
- Position: Running back
- Roster status: Active

Personal information
- Born: May 17, 1995 (age 31); Lincoln, Nebraska, U.S.
- Listed height: 5 ft 10 in (1.78 m)
- Listed weight: 200 lb (91 kg)

Career information
- High school: Eaton (Eaton, Colorado)
- College: Western Colorado (2013–2016)
- NFL draft: 2017: undrafted

Career history
- Los Angeles Chargers (2017–2023); Washington Commanders (2024–present)

Awards and highlights
- Second-team All-Pro (2024) (Note: Selected as a kick returner); RMAC Offensive Freshman of the Year (2013); 4× First-team All-RMAC (2013–2016)

Career NFL statistics as of Week 10, 2026
- Rushing yards: 4,874
- Rushing average: 4.4
- Rushing touchdowns: 43
- Receptions: 490
- Receiving yards: 4,362
- Receiving touchdowns: 30
- Return yards: 679
- Stats at Pro Football Reference

Austin Ryan Ekeler (/ˈɛklər/ EHK-ler; born May 17, 1995) is an American professional football running back for the Washington Commanders of the National Football League (NFL). He played college football for the Western Colorado Mountaineers, finishing as their all-time leader in rushing yards before signing with the Los Angeles Chargers as an undrafted free agent in 2017. With the Chargers, Ekeler led the NFL in touchdowns for the 2021 and 2022 seasons.

== Early life ==
Ekeler was born on May 17, 1995, in Lincoln, Nebraska, and attended Eaton High School in Eaton, Colorado, where he played high school football. He was a four-year letterer and starter for the Fightin' Reds; despite being only 5 ft 5 in (1.65 m) as a freshman, Ekeler rushed for 454 yards and 8 touchdowns on 70 carries. By the end of his career, Ekeler amassed 5,232 rushing yards and 71 touchdowns (39 of which came from his senior year alone) on 561 carries, averaging 9.15 yards-per-carry, with another 581 receiving yards and 10 touchdowns.

Despite this performance, Ekeler was a zero-star recruit who saw little interest from any Division I school. Wyoming recruited him but never offered him a scholarship, and his only scholarship offers came from Adams State, Chadron State, Oklahoma Panhandle State, and Western Colorado. However, the first three universities wanted to switch him to the defensive side of the ball; Western Colorado was the only school to offer him at the tailback position.

== College career ==
Ekeler attended and played college football at Western Colorado from 2013 to 2016 and is their all-time leader in rushing yards.

As a freshman, Ekeler started nine games. He led the team with 1,049 rushing yards to go along with seven rushing touchdowns. As a sophomore, he had 14 rushing touchdowns and set school records with 1,676 rushing yards, 2,093 total all-purpose yards, and 190.3 all-purpose yards per game. As a junior, he had 19 rushing touchdowns and led Division II in all-purpose yards per game with 203.9 and scoring, averaging 12.6 points per game. As a senior, he had 1,495 rushing yards and 15 rushing touchdowns.

== Professional career ==
Pre-draft measurables
Height	Weight	Arm length	Hand span	40-yard dash	10-yard split	20-yard split	20-yard shuttle	Three-cone drill	Vertical jump	Broad jump
5 ft 8 5/8 in (1.74 m)	198 lb (90 kg)	30 3/8 in (0.77 m)	8 1/2 in (0.22 m)	4.48 s	1.50 s	2.59 s	4.28 s	6.92 s	40.5 in (1.03 m)	10 ft 8 in (3.25 m)
All values from Pro Day

=== Los Angeles Chargers ===
==== 2017 ====
Ekeler signed a three-year, $1.66 million contract that includes a $5,000 signing bonus with the Los Angeles Chargers as an undrafted free agent following the 2017 NFL draft.

In the season opening 24–21 loss to the Denver Broncos on Monday Night Football, Ekeler had two receptions for 18 yards in his NFL debut. In Week 4, against the Philadelphia Eagles, he had his first career touchdown, a 35-yard rush, on his first NFL carry. On November 12, against the Jacksonville Jaguars, he had 10 carries for 42 yards to go along with five receptions for 77 receiving yards and two touchdowns. Overall, he finished his rookie season with 260 rushing yards, two rushing touchdowns, 27 receptions, 279 receiving yards, and three receiving touchdowns.

==== 2018 ====
In the 2018 season opener against the Kansas City Chiefs, Ekeler had 39 rushing yards to go along with five receptions for 87 receiving yards and a receiving touchdown in the 38–28 loss. He scored a receiving touchdown in Weeks 4 and 5 against the San Francisco 49ers and Oakland Raiders. In Week 14, against the Cincinnati Bengals, he aggravated a neck injury, which sidelined him for two games. He returned for the regular season finale against the Broncos and scored a rushing touchdown.

Overall, in the 2018 season, he finished with 554 rushing yards, three rushing touchdowns, 39 receptions, 404 receiving yards, and three receiving touchdowns, helping the Chargers earned the #5-seed for the AFC Playoffs. In the Wild Card Round against the Baltimore Ravens, he had 43 scrimmage yards in the 23–17 victory. In the Divisional Round against the New England Patriots, he had three receptions for 19 yards in the 41–28 loss.

==== 2019 ====
Ekeler began the season as the Chargers' starting running back while Melvin Gordon held out due to a contract dispute. In Week 1, Ekeler rushed 12 times for 58 yards and the game-winning touchdown, in addition to catching six passes for 96 yards and two touchdowns in the 30–24 overtime win over the Indianapolis Colts. In Week 2 against the Detroit Lions, he rushed 17 times for 66 yards and a touchdown with additional work in the receiving game, recording six receptions for 67 in the team's 10–13 loss to the Lions. In Week 3 against the Houston Texans, Ekeler rushed nine times for 36 yards and caught seven receptions for 45 yards. In Week 4 against the Miami Dolphins, Ekeler rushed 18 times for 60 yards and one touchdown and caught five passes for 62 yards and one touchdown in the 30–10 win. During Week 7 against the Tennessee Titans, Ekeler had only seven rushing yards but had 118 receiving yards as the Chargers lost 20–23. In Week 11 against the Chiefs on Monday Night Football, Ekeler rushed five times for 24 yards and caught eight passes for 108 yards in the 24–17 loss. During Week 14 against the Jaguars, Ekeler finished with 101 rushing yards on just eight carries, with four receptions for 112 receiving yards, and a touchdown as the Chargers won 45–10. He was the sixth player ever, and the first since Herschel Walker in 1986, to average over 10 yards per carry and reception in a 100/100 game.

Overall, he finished the 2019 season with 557 rushing yards and three rushing touchdowns to go along with 92 receptions for 993 receiving yards and eight receiving touchdowns.

==== 2020 ====
On March 16, 2020, Ekeler signed a four-year $24.5 million contract extension with the Chargers. In Week 2 against the Chiefs, Ekeler rushed 16 times for 93 yards and caught 4 passes for 55 yards during the 23–20 overtime loss. In Week 3 against the Carolina Panthers, Ekeler recorded 143 yards from scrimmage and a rushing touchdown during the 21–16 loss. In Week 4, Ekeler suffered a hamstring injury and a hyperextended knee and was expected to miss four to six weeks. He was placed on injured reserve on October 9, 2020. He was activated on November 28, 2020.

Ekeler made his return from injury in Week 12 against the Buffalo Bills. During the game, he recorded 44 rushing yards and 85 receiving yards during the 27–17 loss. In Week 14 against the Atlanta Falcons, he recorded 146 yards from scrimmage during the 20–17 win. Ekeler finished the 2020 season with 116 carries for 530 rushing yards and one rushing touchdown to go along with 54 receptions for 403 receiving yards and two receiving touchdowns.

==== 2021 ====
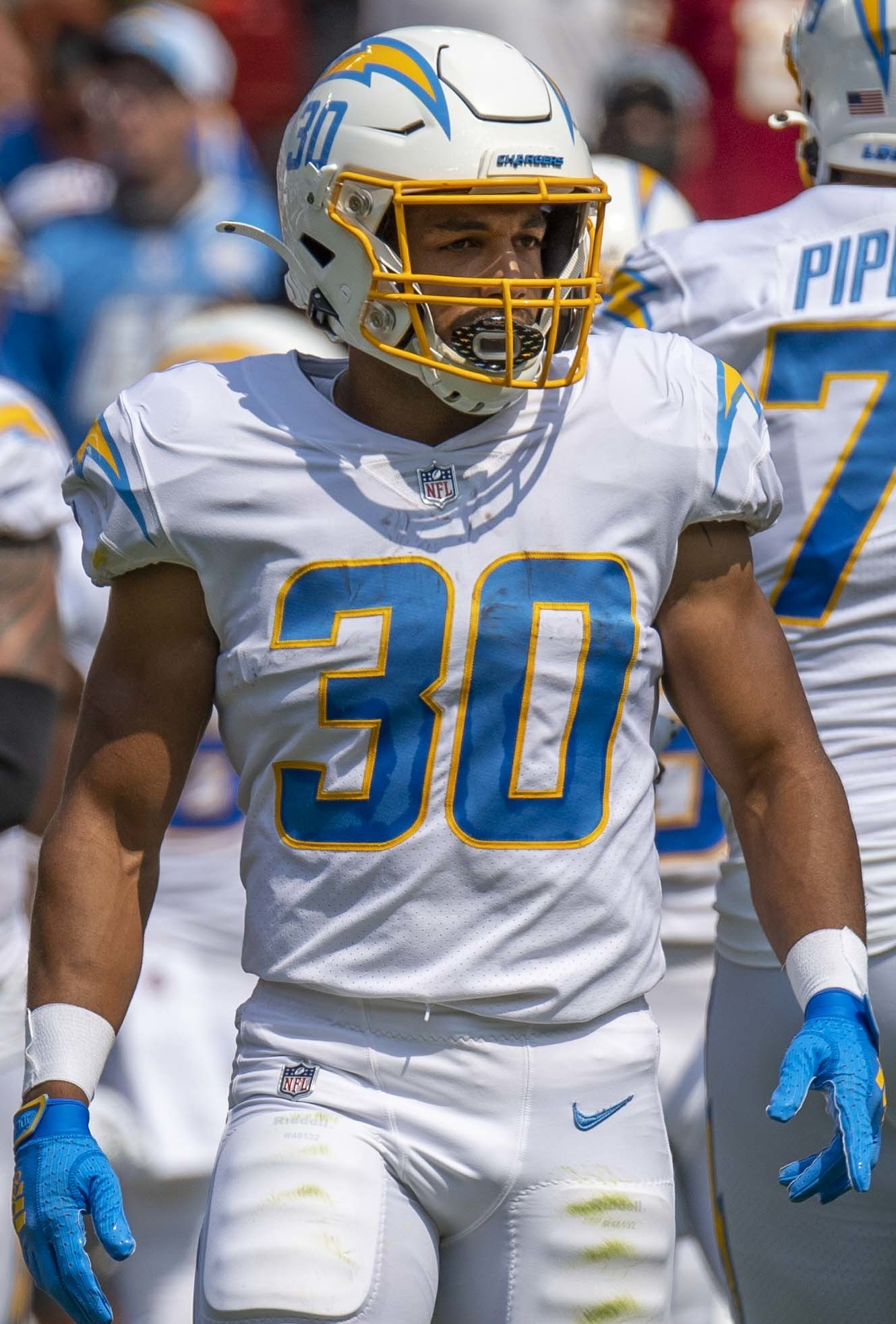
Ekeler with the Los Angeles Chargers in 2021

In Week 4, against the Las Vegas Raiders, Ekeler had 15 carries for 117 rushing yards, one rushing touchdown, and one receiving touchdown in the 28–14 victory. The following week, against the Cleveland Browns, Ekeler had 119 scrimmage yards, two rushing touchdowns, and one receiving touchdown in the 47–42 victory. In Week 11, against the Pittsburgh Steelers, he had 115 scrimmage yards, two rushing touchdowns, and two receiving touchdowns in the 41–37 victory.

Overall in 2021, Ekeler tallied 206 attempts for 911 rushing yards and 12 rushing touchdowns, all career-highs, to go along with 70 receptions for 647 receiving yards and eight receiving touchdowns. Ekeler had eight games going over 100 yards from scrimmage. With 20 total touchdowns, he tied with Colts running back Jonathan Taylor in total touchdowns scored.

Ekeler also joined Hall of Fame running back LaDainian Tomlinson as the only two players in Chargers franchise history to score at least 20 touchdowns in a single season. He was ranked 46th by his fellow players on the NFL Top 100 Players of 2022.

==== 2022 ====
In Week 4, against the Texans, Ekeler had 109 scrimmage yards, two rushing touchdowns, and one receiving touchdown in the 34–24 victory. In Week 5, against the Browns, he had 16 carries for 173 rushing yards and one rushing touchdown to go along with a receiving touchdown in the 30–28 victory. In Week 7 against the Seattle Seahawks and Week 9 against the Falcons, he had a rushing touchdown and a receiving touchdown in both games. In Week 16, against the Colts, he scored two rushing touchdowns. With those two scores, Ekeler and Marshall Faulk are the only two players in NFL history to have 10 or more rushing touchdowns and five or more receiving touchdowns in consecutive seasons. In Week 17, against the Los Angeles Rams, Ekeler rushed for 122 yards and had 39 receiving yards and two touchdowns, including a career-long 72-yard run, earning AFC Offensive Player of the Week.

Ekeler finished the 2022 season with new career-highs of 204 carries for 915 rushing yards and 13 rushing touchdowns, to go along with a career-high 107 receptions for 722 receiving yards and five receiving touchdowns. He led the league in total touchdowns scored for the second-consecutive season, with 18. In the Wild Card Round, Ekeler scored two rushing touchdowns in the Chargers' 31–30 loss to the Jaguars. He was ranked 21st by his fellow players on the NFL Top 100 Players of 2023.

==== 2023 ====
In the 2023 regular season opener, Ekeler had 164 scrimmage yards and a rushing touchdown in a 36–34 loss to the Dolphins. He suffered a high-ankle sprain during the game, and would be held out of the next three games. In Week 8, he had 123 scrimmage yards and scored a receiving touchdown in the Chargers' 30-13 victory against the Bears. In Week 9, he scored two rushing touchdowns in a win over the Jets. That would mark his only multi-touchdown game of the season, after having 10 over the previous two seasons.

He finished the 2023 season with 179 carries for 628 rushing yards and five rushing touchdowns, averaging a career low 3.5 yards per carry. He also caught 51 passes for 436 receiving yards and one receiving touchdown in 14 games and starts.

=== Washington Commanders ===
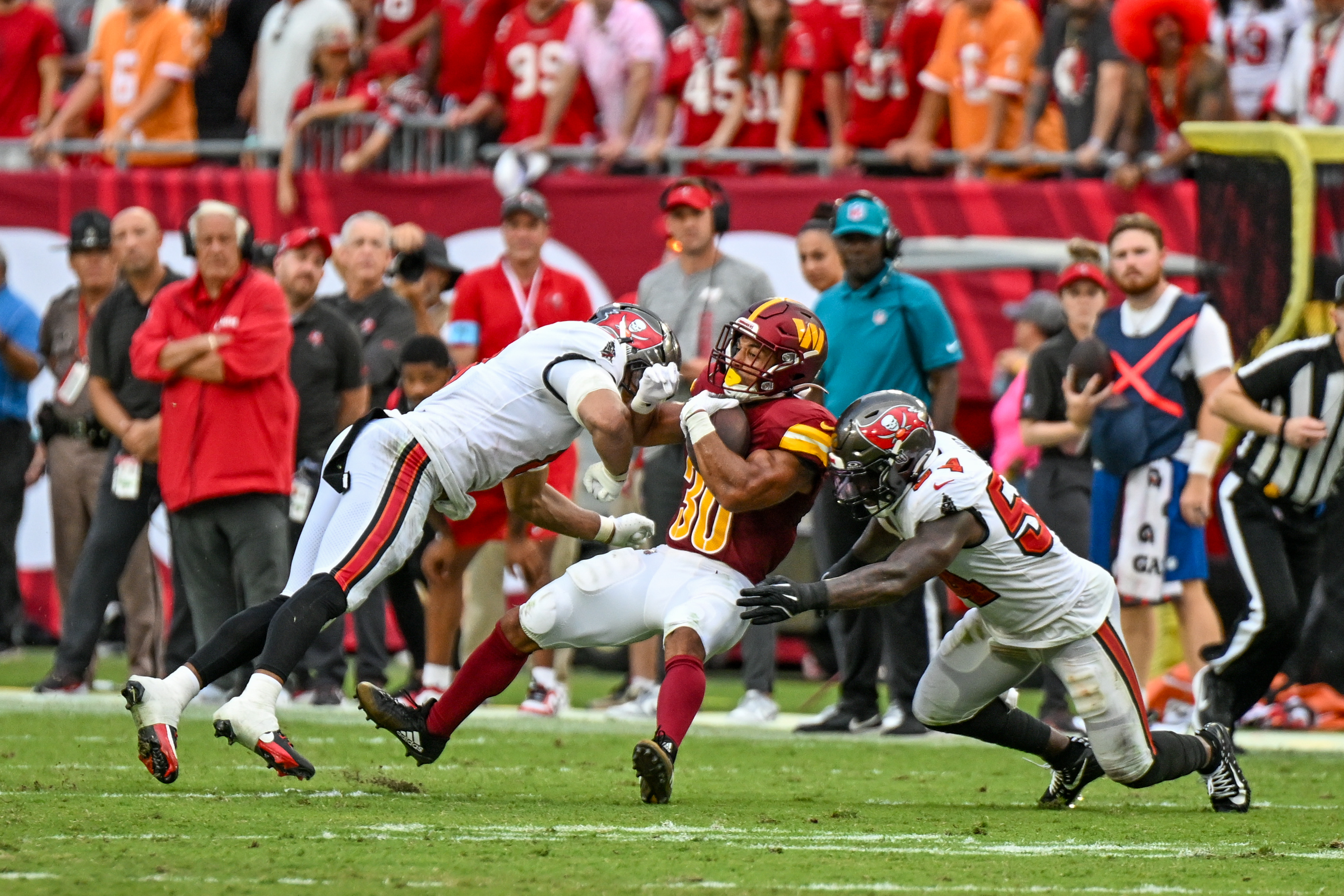
Ekeler playing against the Tampa Bay Buccaneers in 2024

==== 2024 ====
Ekeler signed a two-year contract with the Washington Commanders on March 18, 2024. He suffered a concussion in a Week 3 Monday Night Football game against the Cincinnati Bengals and sat out the following week against the Arizona Cardinals. In a Week 12 game against the Dallas Cowboys, Ekeler suffered another concussion and was placed on injured reserve. He was activated for the regular season finale against the Cowboys.

Ekeler finished the 2024 season with 77 carries for 367 rushing yards and four rushing touchdowns to go with 35 receptions for 366 receiving yards.He finished third in the NFL with 594 kickoff return yards on 19 total returns in 12 games. His 31.3 yards per return average also ranked third among players with at least 15 kickoff returns. He earned Second-Team All-Pro honors as a kick returner in 2024, marking the first All-Pro selection of his career.

==== 2025 ====
During the second game of the 2025 season, Ekeler suffered a non-contact injury during the Thursday night game against the Green Bay Packers and was carted off the field. The next day, he was ruled out for remainder of the season with an Achilles tear; he was placed on injured reserve on September 15. Ekeler finished the season with 43 rushing yards and 38 receiving yards.

==== 2026 ====
On September 29, 2026, Ekeler re-signed with the Commanders on a one-year deal.

== Career statistics ==
=== NFL ===
==== Regular season ====
Year	Team	Games		Rushing					Receiving					Kick returns					Fumbles	
Year	Team	GP	GS	Att	Yds	Avg	Lng	TD	Rec	Yds	Avg	Lng	TD	Ret	Yds	Avg	Lng	TD	Fum	Lost
2017	LAC	16	0	47	260	5.5	35	2	27	279	10.3	38	3	5	85	17.0	22	0	2	2
2018	LAC	14	3	106	554	5.2	41	3	39	404	10.4	44	3	0	0	0.0	0	0	1	1
2019	LAC	16	8	132	557	4.2	35	3	92	993	10.8	84	8	0	0	0.0	0	0	3	2
2020	LAC	10	10	116	530	4.6	27	1	54	403	7.5	28	2	0	0	0.0	0	0	1	0
2021	LAC	16	16	206	911	4.4	28	12	70	647	9.2	40	8	0	0	0.0	0	0	4	3
2022	LAC	17	17	204	915	4.5	72	13	107	722	6.7	23	5	0	0	0.0	0	0	5	3
2023	LAC	14	14	179	628	3.5	55	5	51	436	8.5	39	1	0	0	0.0	0	0	5	4
2024	WAS	12	6	77	367	4.8	50	4	35	366	10.5	34	0	19	594	31.3	62	0	3	0
2025	WAS	2	2	14	43	3.1	6	0	5	38	7.6	15	0	0	0	0.0	0	0	0	0
2026	WAS	6	0	33	109	3.3	18	0	10	74	7.4	15	0	0	0	0.0	0	0	0	0
Career		123	76	1,114	4,874	4.4	72	43	490	4,362	8.9	84	30	24	679	28.3	62	0	24	15

==== Postseason ====
Year	Team	Games		Rushing					Receiving					Kick returns					Fumbles	
Year	Team	GP	GS	Att	Yds	Avg	Lng	TD	Rec	Yds	Avg	Lng	TD	Ret	Yds	Avg	Lng	TD	Fum	Lost
2018	LAC	2	0	11	29	2.6	7	0	7	33	4.7	9	0	—	—	—	—	—	0	0
2022	LAC	1	1	13	35	2.7	13	2	2	8	4.0	4	0	—	—	—	—	—	0	0
2024	WAS	3	0	22	89	4.0	35	0	12	84	7.0	24	0	1	32	32.0	32	0	1	1
Career		6	1	46	153	3.3	35	2	21	125	6.0	24	0	1	32	32.0	32	0	1	1

=== College ===
College statistics
Year	GP	Rushing					Receiving				
Year	GP	Att	Yds	Avg	Lng	TD	Rec	Yds	Avg	Lng	TD
2013	9	182	1,049	5.8	71	7	27	260	5.9	28	1
2014	11	298	1,676	5.6	82	14	38	417	10.9	47	2
2015	10	227	1,637	7.2	83	19	32	402	12.5	85	2
2016	10	232	1,495	6.4	88	15	18	236	13.1	48	3
Career	40	939	5,857	6.2	88	55	115	1,315	11.4	85	8

== Career highlights ==
=== Awards and honors ===
NFL

- Second-team All-Pro (2024) (Note: Selected as a kick returner)
- Yards after catch leader: (2022)
- 2× NFL Top 100 — 46th (2022), 21st (2022)

College

- RMAC Offensive Freshman of the Year (2013)
- 4× First-team All-RMAC (2013–2016)

=== NFL records ===
- One of four players in 15 years to score at least 15 touchdowns in back-to-back seasons.
- Along with Marshall Faulk, Ekeler is one of two players in NFL history to have 10 or more rushing touchdowns and five or more receiving touchdowns in consecutive seasons.
- Along with Priest Holmes, Ekeler is one of two players in NFL history to be an undrafted player with 1,500 scrimmage yards and 15 touchdowns in consecutive seasons.
- Most catches by a running back in a single season in Chargers history.

== Personal life ==
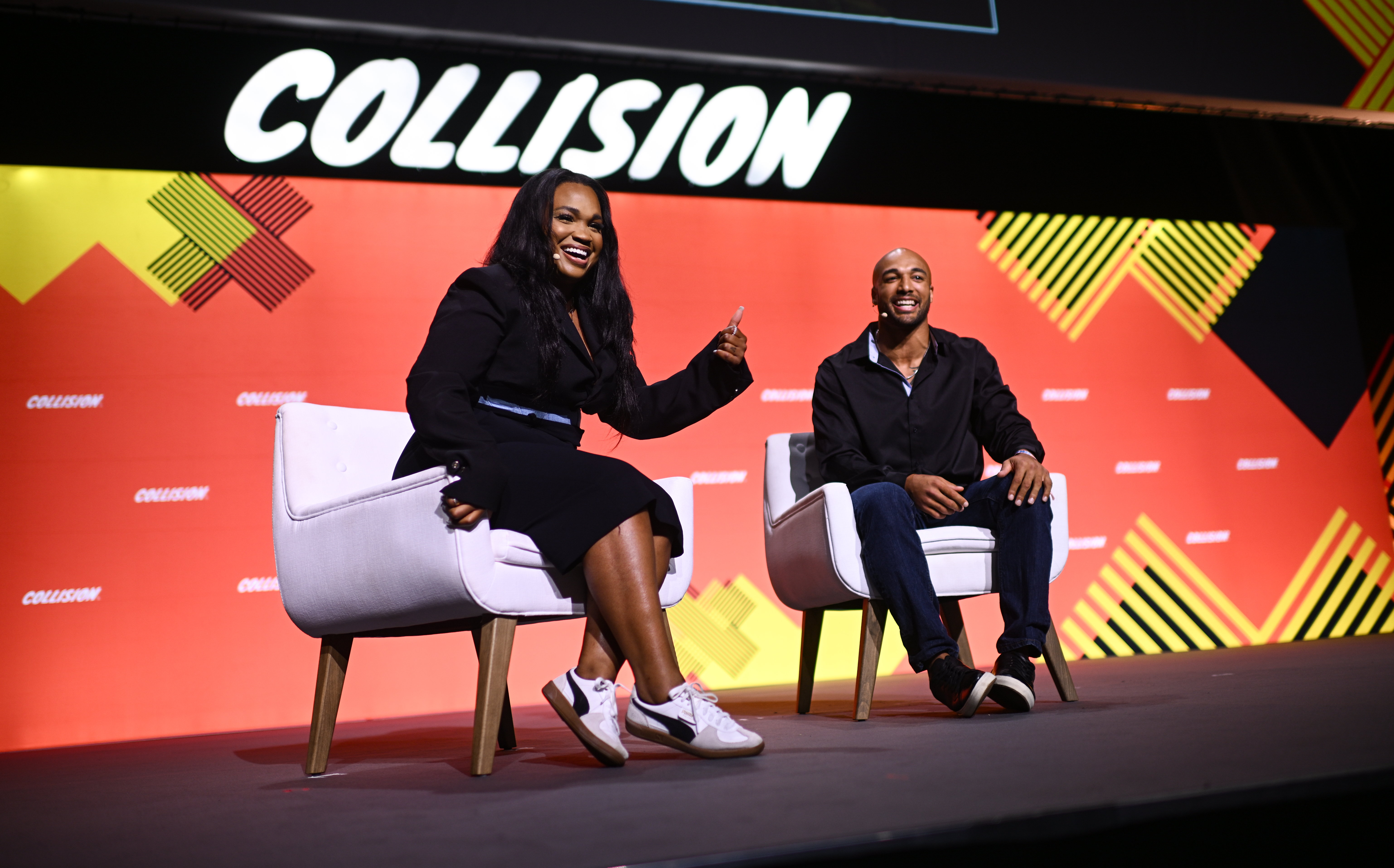
Ekeler speaking with Kayla Grey, 2024

Ekeler's younger brother, Wyett Ekeler, played football at the University of Wyoming and was a defensive back for the Indianapolis Colts. His mother, Suzanne Ekeler, played college basketball at the University of Colorado, Colorado Springs. Austin's biological father left the family at a young age and is currently serving a life sentence in a Nevada maximum security prison.

Ekeler established the Austin Ekeler Foundation in 2021 with a mission "to help create opportunities for people to fulfill their passions and ultimately their lives." The same year he founded the Gridiron Gaming Group as a way for sports personalities to grow their online communities by livestreaming with other athletes.

Ekeler married Melanie Wilking on May 25, 2024. They welcomed their first child, a son, on May 18, 2026.
