= Trent Sieg =

American football player (born 1995)

No. 44 – Dallas Cowboys
- Position: Long snapper
- Roster status: Active

Personal information
- Born: May 19, 1995 (age 31); Greeley, Colorado, U.S.
- Listed height: 6 ft 3 in (1.91 m)
- Listed weight: 255 lb (116 kg)

Career information
- High school: Eaton (Eaton, Colorado)
- College: Colorado State (2013–2017)
- NFL draft: 2018: undrafted

Career history
- Baltimore Ravens (2018)*; Oakland / Las Vegas Raiders (2018–2022); Dallas Cowboys (2023–present)
- * Offseason or practice squad member only

Career NFL statistics as of Week 8, 2026
- Games played: 139
- Total tackles: 11
- Fumble recoveries: 1
- Stats at Pro Football Reference

Trent Sieg (born May 19, 1995) is an American professional football long snapper for the Dallas Cowboys of the National Football League (NFL). He played college football for the Colorado State Rams.

== Early life ==
Sieg attended Eaton High School. As a senior, he contributed to the team achieving a Patriot League championship with a 10–1 overall record. He registered 29 receptions, 510 receiving yards, four touchdowns as a tight end and 67 tackles, 10 sacks as a linebacker. He posted a career-high six catches for 168 yards and two touchdowns against Valley High School. He received Denver Post’s All-Colorado football honors as a linebacker.

He received academic All-Colorado honors in his last two years. He also lettered in baseball and basketball.

== College career ==
Sieg accepted a football scholarship from Colorado State University. As a redshirt freshman, he replaced four-year long snapper Tanner Hedstrom. He appeared in all 13 games, while making two tackles.

As a sophomore, he snapped to Ray Guy Award finalist and All-American punter Hayden Hunt, who finished fifth nationally with a 46.0 yards per punt average. He appeared in all 13 games, making two tackles. He received Academic All-Mountain West Conference honors.

As a junior, he played in all 13 games and received Academic All-Mountain West honors.

As a senior, he appeared in all 13 games and received Academic All-Mountain West honors. He never missed a game during his college career (51).

== Professional career ==
Pre-draft measurables
Height	Weight	Arm length	Hand span	Wingspan	40-yard dash	10-yard split	20-yard split	20-yard shuttle	Three-cone drill	Vertical jump	Broad jump	Bench press
6 ft 3 1/4 in (1.91 m)	240 lb (109 kg)	30 7/8 in (0.78 m)	9 1/4 in (0.23 m)	6 ft 3 1/4 in (1.91 m)	5.31 s	1.82 s	3.14 s	4.80 s	7.15 s	27.0 in (0.69 m)	8 ft 11 in (2.72 m)	17 reps
All values from Pro Day

=== Baltimore Ravens ===
Sieg was signed as an undrafted free agent by the Baltimore Ravens after the 2018 NFL draft on April 29. He competed with incumbent long snapper Morgan Cox during training camp. On August 31, he was waived before the start of the season.

=== Oakland / Las Vegas Raiders ===
On September 12, 2018, Sieg was signed by the Oakland Raiders to replace long snapper Andrew DePaola, who was lost for the year with a right knee ACL injury. As a rookie, he appeared in the final 15 games, while helping rookie placekicker Daniel Carlson set a new franchise season record with a 94.1 field goal percentage.

In 2019, Sieg was named the long snapper over DePaola, who was released on August 25, 2019. He contributed to rookie A. J. Cole III setting rookie club records for punting average, net average and punts downed inside the 20-yard line.

On January 22, 2020, the Raiders moved to Las Vegas. On March 27, 2020, he signed his exclusive rights tender. He helped Carlson set franchise-records with 144 scored points and a 94.3 field goal percentage during the season.

On March 3, 2021, he signed a three-year contract extension with the team. On November 29, 2021, he was placed on the reserve/COVID-19 list, ending a streak of 58 consecutive games played. He was replaced with Carson Tinker. On December 9, 2021, he was activated off the reserve/COVID-19 list. He appeared in 16 games and facilitated Carlson to break his franchise record for points scored in a single-season with 150.

In 2022, he appeared in all 17 games and made two special teams tackles.

On March 19, 2023, Sieg was released after the Raiders acquired long snapper Jacob Bobenmoyer, who reunited with special teams coordinator Tom McMahon. He played for the team during five seasons, making five special teams tackles, while appearing in all but two games during that time.

=== Dallas Cowboys ===
On March 22, 2023, Sieg was signed by the Dallas Cowboys, to replace Jake McQuaide who left in free agency. He had two special teams tackles and was a key part of the field goal unit, contributing to first-year kicker Brandon Aubrey setting multiple NFL and franchise records.

On March 12, 2024, Sieg re-signed with the Cowboys.

On November 23, 2025, Sieg made a key fumble recovery inside the 10-yard line during a punt in the 4th quarter of a 24-21 victory over the Philadelphia Eagles.
