= Eaton High School (Colorado) =

Location
- 1661 Collins Street; Eaton, Colorado 80615; United States; 40°31′31″N 104°44′3″W

Information
- School type: Public high school
- School district: Eaton RE-2
- CEEB code: 060490
- NCES School ID: 080360000476
- Principal: Jessica Grable
- Teaching staff: 36.89 (on an FTE basis)
- Grades: 9–12
- Gender: Coeducational
- Enrollment: 574 (2023–24)
- Student to teacher ratio: 15.56
- Campus size: 64 acres (26 ha)
- Campus type: Town, Fringe
- Colors: Red and white
- Athletics conference: Patriot
- Mascot: Reds
- Feeder schools: Eaton Middle School
- Website: eaton-high-school.eaton.k12.co.us

Eaton High School is a high school in Eaton, Colorado, United States. It is a part of the Eaton School District. They have a football team known as the Eaton Reds.

== History ==
In 2022, the high school relocated to a new 64-acre campus in the western part of Eaton, funded by a $128.5 million voter-approved bond passed in 2019. The former high school building is now occupied by Eaton Middle School.

== Notable alumni ==
- Austin Ekeler, NFL player
- Trent Sieg, NFL player
- Mitch Unrein, former NFL player
