= Benjamin Harrison Eaton =

American politician

Benjamin Eaton
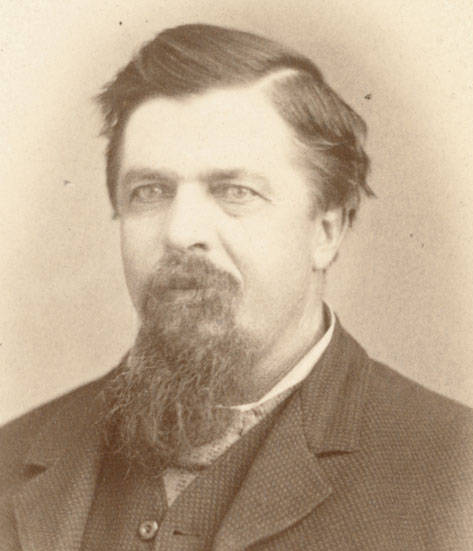
- Eaton circa 1885

4th Governor of Colorado
- In office January 13, 1885 – January 11, 1887
- Lieutenant: Peter W. Breene
- Preceded by: James Grant
- Succeeded by: Alva Adams

Personal details
- Born: December 15, 1833 Coshocton, Ohio, U.S.
- Died: October 29, 1904 (aged 70) Greeley, Colorado, U.S.
- Resting place: Linn Grove Cemetery in Greeley, Co
- Party: Republican
- Spouse: Rebecca J. Hill Eaton (m.1864)
- Children: 4

Benjamin Harrison Eaton (December 15, 1833 – October 29, 1904) was an American politician, entrepreneur and agriculturalist in the late 19th and early 20th century. Eaton was a founding officer of the Greeley Colony and was instrumental in the establishment of modern irrigation farming to Northern Colorado. A member of the Republican Party, he served as the fourth governor of Colorado, from January 1885 to January 1887, with the nickname of the "farmer governor". He was one of the largest land owners in Weld and Larimer counties, at one time owning over ninety 160 acre (0.6 km²) parcels, all watered from canals and reservoirs of his own construction. His projects were influential in helping turn the South Platte River valley into an important agricultural region in the state's economy. The town of Eaton, Colorado in western Weld County is named for him.

Eaton is among Colorado's sixteen notable pioneers who are depicted in stained glass on the rotunda of the Colorado State Capitol Building.

== Early life ==
Eaton was born in Coshocton, Ohio, the second of eight children born to Hannah (née Smith) and Levi Eaton. His maternal grandmother was Mary (née Yarnall) Smith, whose great grandfather, Francis Yarnall, emigrated to the Penn Colony in 1683.

Eaton went to school in West Bedford, Ohio and taught school there as well. In 1854, at the age of 21, he moved to Louisa County, Iowa, where he taught school for two years. He returned to Ohio in 1856 where he married Delilah Wolf. His wife died in 1857 after giving birth to a son, Aaron James Eaton.

After emigrating to Colorado in 1858 during the Colorado Gold Rush he settled in Weld County. Later that year, Eaton went to Iowa for the second time. The following year in 1859, at the height of the Colorado Gold Rush, he moved from Iowa back to Colorado. He prospected for gold in Colorado and New Mexico, as well as working on farms. During the American Civil War, he served under Colonel Kit Carson in the New Mexico Volunteers. In 1863, he built a farm on the present location of Windsor, Colorado. (Mike Peters, Greeley Tribune, "How Weld Towns Got Their Name").

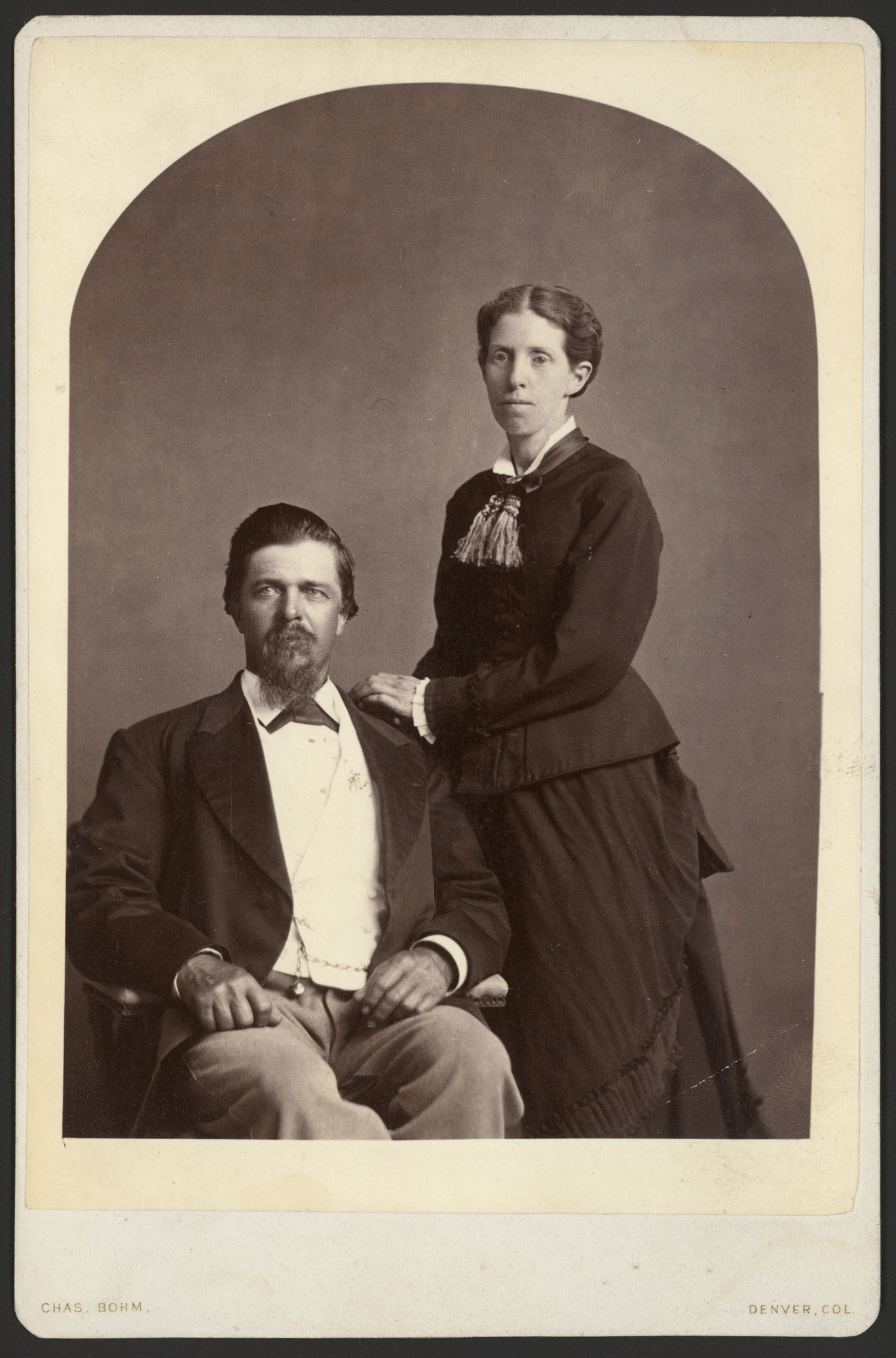
Benjamin and Rebecca Eaton.

He returned to Louisa County, Iowa in 1864 and married Rebecca J. Hill, his second wife. Together they crossed the Great Plains with his second wife that year and settled in Weld County along its western border with Larimer County, establishing a livestock raising operation. He was an early prominent citizen of Fort Collins, the nearest post office and trading point, and was a charter member of the Masonic Lodge there. In 1866, he was elected as Justice of the peace, serving in that capacity for nine years. For six years, he served concurrently as a county commissioner. Eaton and Rebecca Hill had three children: Lincoln Eaton, Bruce Grant Eaton, and Jennie Bell Eaton.

== Later career ==
In 1870 Eaton met Nathan Meeker, whom newspaperman Horace Greeley had dispatched to Colorado to pick the Union Colony site. Eaton suggested the land southeast of his place, at the confluence of the South Platte and Poudre Rivers. Eaton promised to assist the ditch construction that would be critical to the colony's farms. Bankrolled by Horace Greeley, the Union Colonists secured 60,000 contiguous acres. On March 15, 1870, the executive committee named the town "Greeley." Gophers continually thwarted the 35-mile Canal No. 1 but, according to Union Colony minutes, Eaton would not give up.

Eaton expanded his operations from farming into contracting, specializing in the building of irrigation canals and reservoirs, a business he heavily promoted as a means of bringing growth and wealth to Larimer and Weld Counties. In 1873, in association with John C. Abbott, he built what later became known as Larimer County Canal No. 2, which watered large areas of land west, south, and southwest of Fort Collins. Competition for water between Fort Collins Agricultural Colony and the Greeley became desperate and in 1874 almost led to gunfire. Ben Eaton and a few others calmed Greeley colonists with a commitment to divide the water according to need and a promise to deliver it. The promise was not necessary because it rained.

In 1878 he began construction of the Larimer and Weld Canal, once known as the Eaton Ditch. The Larimer and Weld Irrigation Company was incorporated on March 10, 1879. The company's board of directors were James Duff, Hyde Sparkes, Benjamin H. Eaton, Thomas B. Dunbar, and Aaron J. Eaton. The capital stock, $200,000, was divided into two thousand shares at $100 each. This was the largest and longest irrigation canal in the state, irrigating 50,000 acres. In 1879 he built the High Line Canal in Denver for a group of British investors. He later built the Windsor Reservoir near present-day Windsor, as well as many other smaller water projects throughout Larimer and Weld counties. He died in 1904 at Greeley.

== See also ==
History of Larimer County, Colorado, Ansel Watrous (1911).

Party political offices
Preceded by E. L. Campbell	Republican nominee for Governor of Colorado; 1884	Succeeded by William H. Meyer
Political offices
Preceded by James Benton Grant	Governor of Colorado; 1885–1887	Succeeded by Alva Adams
