= Eaton, Colorado =

Statutory town in Weld County, Colorado, United States

- statutory town
- Town of Eaton
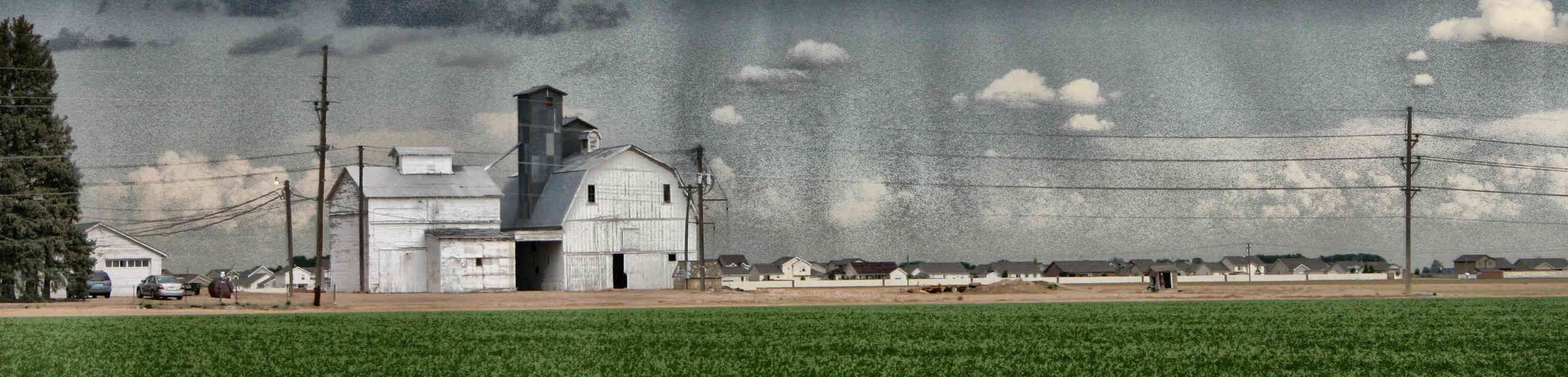
- Barn in Eaton, Colorado

- Location of the Town of Eaton in Weld County, Colorado
- Coordinates: 40°31′32″N 104°42′47″W
- Country: United States
- State: Colorado
- County: Weld
- Incorporated (town): December 5, 1892

Government
  - Type: statutory town

Area
  - Total: 3.160 sq mi (8.185 km^{2})
  - Land: 3.160 sq mi (8.185 km^{2})
  - Water: 0 sq mi (0.000 km^{2})
- Elevation: 4,839 ft (1,475 m)

Population (2020)
  - Total: 5,802
  - Density: 1,836/sq mi (709/km^{2})
- Time zone: UTC−07:00 (MST)
  - Summer (DST): UTC−06:00 (MDT)
- ZIP code: 80615
- Area codes: 970/748
- GNIS town ID: 2412462
- FIPS code: 08-22860
- Website: www.eatonco.org

The Town of Eaton is a statutory town located in Weld County, Colorado, United States. The town population was 5,802 at the 2020 United States census, a +32.92% increase since the 2010 United States census. Eaton is a part of the Greeley, CO Metropolitan Statistical Area and the Front Range Urban Corridor.

== History ==
The town is named for Benjamin H. Eaton and Aaron J. Eaton, of the Eaton Milling and Elevator Company, pioneers of irrigation who played a leading role in transforming the arid prairie of the Great Plains east of Colorado's Front Range into a thriving agricultural region with water brought from the nearby Rocky Mountains in the late 19th century. The Eatonton, Colorado, post office opened on September 25, 1882, but the name was shortened to Eaton a year later on September 28, 1883. Eaton was first named Eatonton to avoid conflict with the Easton post office in El Paso county. When Easton had changed its name to Eastonville, the last syllable of Eatonton was dropped, and the town has since been known as Eaton.

Much of the farming country around Eaton, Colorado continues to depend on the irrigation systems engineered by the Eatons and others to this day. Benjamin Eaton later served as Governor of Colorado from 1885 to 1887.

The first citizens of Eaton began to settle in 1880. One of the only occupations available was working on irrigation ditches from Eaton to Greeley.

On September 28, 1892, a petition was submitted to the county judge requesting that Eaton be incorporated. The petition had been signed by 36 residents, including Benjamin Eaton himself. The county judge ordered that an election be held to decide whether or not the remaining residents desired Eaton to be incorporated. 50 votes were cast, every one of them in favor of incorporation. The Town of Eaton was incorporated on December 5, 1892.

== Geography ==
Eaton lies on the Denver, Colorado-Cheyenne, Wyoming mainline of the Union Pacific Railroad, and along U.S. Route 85, approximately 7 miles north of Greeley, Colorado.

At the 2020 United States census, the town had a total area of 2,023 acres (8.185 km^{2}), all of it land.

== Demographics ==
Historical population
Census	Pop.	Note	%±
1900	384		—
1910	1,157		201.3%
1920	1,289		11.4%
1930	1,221		−5.3%
1940	1,322		8.3%
1950	1,276		−3.5%
1960	1,267		−0.7%
1970	1,389		9.6%
1980	1,932		39.1%
1990	1,959		1.4%
2000	2,690		37.3%
2010	4,365		62.3%
2020	5,802		32.9%
2023 (est.)	5,832	▲	0.5%
U.S. Decennial Census

=== 2020 census ===
As of the 2020 census, Eaton had a population of 5,802. The median age was 36.5 years. 27.4% of residents were under the age of 18 and 16.0% of residents were 65 years of age or older. For every 100 females there were 98.0 males, and for every 100 females age 18 and over there were 93.6 males age 18 and over.

97.7% of residents lived in urban areas, while 2.3% lived in rural areas.

There were 2,096 households in Eaton, of which 37.9% had children under the age of 18 living in them. Of all households, 64.4% were married-couple households, 11.8% were households with a male householder and no spouse or partner present, and 19.5% were households with a female householder and no spouse or partner present. About 18.8% of all households were made up of individuals and 10.7% had someone living alone who was 65 years of age or older.

There were 2,146 housing units, of which 2.3% were vacant. The homeowner vacancy rate was 0.6% and the rental vacancy rate was 3.9%.

Racial composition as of the 2020 census
Race	Number	Percent
White	4,803	82.8%
Black or African American	22	0.4%
American Indian and Alaska Native	20	0.3%
Asian	63	1.1%
Native Hawaiian and Other Pacific Islander	14	0.2%
Some other race	257	4.4%
Two or more races	623	10.7%
Hispanic or Latino (of any race)	964	16.6%

=== 2000 census ===
As of the 2000 census, there were 2,690 people, 1,033 households, and 765 families residing in the town. The population density was 1,403.9 inhabitants per square mile (542.0/km^{2}). There were 1,067 housing units at an average density of 556.9 per square mile (215.0/km^{2}). The racial makeup of the town was 91.12% White, 0.04% African American, 0.52% Native American, 0.78% Asian, 5.76% from other races, and 1.78% from two or more races. Hispanic or Latino of any race were 12.64% of the population.

There were 1,033 households, out of which 36.7% had children under the age of 18 living with them, 62.0% were married couples living together, 9.1% had a female householder with no husband present, and 25.9% were non-families. 23.0% of all households were made up of individuals, and 13.6% had someone living alone who was 65 years of age or older. The average household size was 2.60 and the average family size was 3.07.

In the town, the population was spread out, with 28.6% under the age of 18, 7.0% from 18 to 24, 26.6% from 25 to 44, 25.0% from 45 to 64, and 12.8% who were 65 years of age or older. The median age was 38 years. For every 100 females, there were 90.6 males. For every 100 females age 18 and over, there were 86.2 males.

The median income for a household in the town was $47,314, and the median income for a family was $55,144. Males had a median income of $38,839 versus $27,292 for females. The per capita income for the town was $20,816. About 3.4% of families and 5.3% of the population were below the poverty line, including 5.6% of those under age 18 and 10.1% of those age 65 or over.

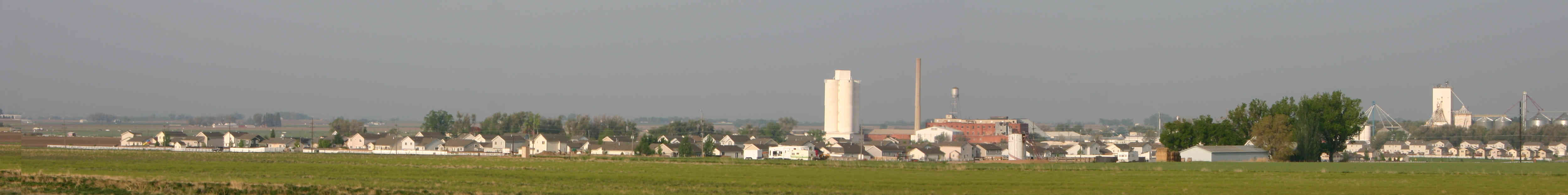
The Town of Eaton, Colorado, USA.

== Notable people ==
Eaton can claim two active National Football League (NFL) players:

- Austin Ekeler, current running back for the Washington Commanders, attended and played high school football for The Fightin' Reds at Eaton High School.
- Trent Sieg, current long snapper for the Las Vegas Raiders, also attended Eaton High and played high school football for the Fightin' Reds.

== See also ==
- Greeley, CO Metropolitan Statistical Area
- Denver-Aurora-Greeley, CO Combined Statistical Area
- Front Range Urban Corridor
