= John Watrous =

John Watrous may refer to:

- John Charles Watrous (1801–1874), United States federal judge
- John S. Watrous (died 1897), politician from the Minnesota territory
- John Watrous (computer scientist), computer scientist at the University of Waterloo
