= Jerome Anthony Watrous =

19th-century journalist, historian, soldier

Jerome A. Watrous
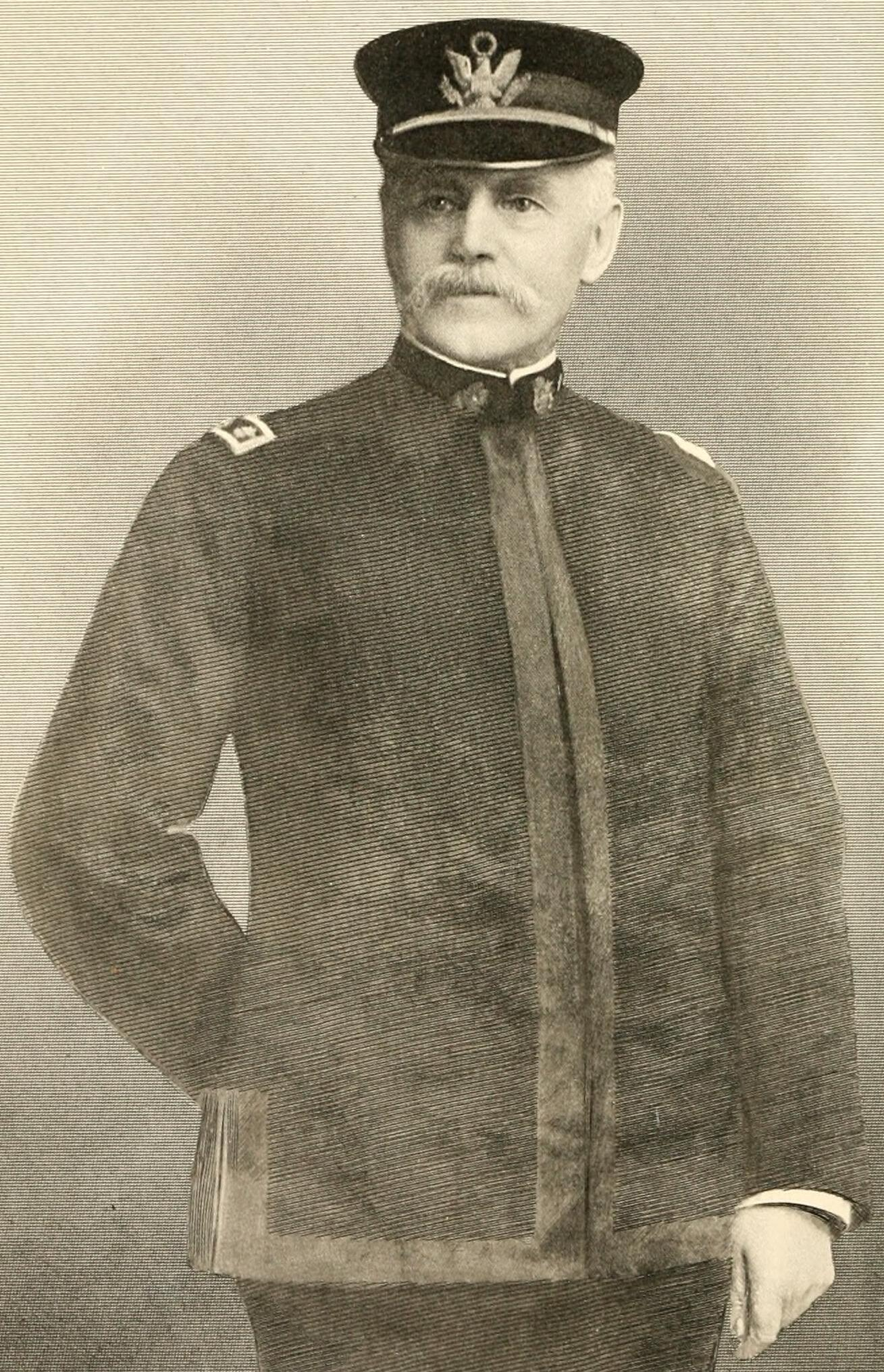
- Portrait of Watrous

Member of the Wisconsin State Assembly from the Clark–Jackson district
- In office January 1, 1867 – January 1, 1868
- Preceded by: Lorenzo Merrill
- Succeeded by: James O'Neill

Personal details
- Born: September 6, 1840 Conklin, New York
- Died: June 5, 1922 (aged 81) Whitewater, Wisconsin
- Resting place: Forest Home Cemetery; Milwaukee, Wisconsin
- Party: Republican
- Spouses: Lucy Ann Lashway (m. 1861; died 1865); Mary Ellen Benedict (m. 1866; died 1917)
- Children: Myra (MacRae)^{(b. 1864; died 1935)}; Richard Benedict Watrous^{(b. 1869; died 1945)}; Margaret D. (Betts)^{(b. 1872; died 1910)}; Amy (Derry)^{(b. 1874; died 1906)}; Grace Lillian (Washburn)^{(b. 1878; died 1958)}; Paul Jerome Watrous^{(b. 1880; died 1949)}; Maude Evangeline (Betts)^{(b. 1882; died 1955)}
- Relatives: Ansel Watrous (brother); William F. Watrous (uncle)
- Profession: journalist, historian

Military service
- Allegiance: United States
- Branch/service: United States Volunteers; Union Army; United States Army
- Years of service: 1861–1865 (USV); 1898–1904 (USA)
- Rank: Lt. Colonel, USA
- Unit: 6th Reg. Wis. Vol. Infantry; Iron Brigade
- Battles/wars: American Civil War; Spanish–American War

Jerome Anthony Watrous (September 6, 1840 – June 5, 1922) was an American journalist, historian, and soldier. He served with the Iron Brigade of the Army of the Potomac throughout the American Civil War, and later served one term in the Wisconsin State Assembly. As a historian, he was the author of the first two volumes of Memoirs of Milwaukee County.

== Early life ==
Born in Conklin, New York, Watrous moved with his parents to Wisconsin in 1844. He returned to New York from 1850 until 1857. At that time he moved back to Wisconsin and settled in Calumet County, where he taught school for two years.

== Journalism career ==
Watrous attended Lawrence College (now Lawrence University) for one semester, and briefly worked on the editorial staff of the Menasha Conservator and the Appleton Crescent, a forerunner of the Appleton Post-Crescent. The outbreak of the civil war interrupted his journalism career between 1861 and 1865.

Returning to Wisconsin in 1865, Watrous worked as the editor of the Black River Falls Jackson County Banner for several years, before moving to edit the Fond du Lac Commonwealth in 1869. In 1877, Watrous edited the Milwaukee Sunday Telegraph. Surviving envelopes mailed from the Milwaukee Telegraph, now in philatelic hands, indicate "J.A." and "R.B" Watrous as its editors in 1897 and 1898.

== Military career ==
When the American Civil War began, Watrous enlisted in Company E of the 6th Wisconsin Volunteer Infantry Regiment. During the war, he rose to become a sergeant, and briefly attained the rank of adjutant general of the Iron Brigade. He was taken prisoner on March 31, 1865. He mustered out in 1865 with the brevet rank of captain.

Thirty-three years later, Watrous was commissioned as a major in the U.S. Army with the outbreak of the Spanish–American War in 1898. He served for a while as paymaster of the Department of Columbia headquartered in Portland, Oregon, before being sent to Manila in the Philippines in 1900. He was made chief paymaster of the Department of the Southern Philippines in 1901, and was promoted to lieutenant colonel in 1904. Shortly thereafter, Watrous retired from the military and returned to Wisconsin.

== Political career ==
Politically, Watrous was a Republican. He served in the Wisconsin State Assembly in 1867, as a state pension agent from 1887 to 1889, and the Milwaukee customs collector from 1890 to 1892.

== Historian and author ==
Returning to Wisconsin after the Spanish–American War, Watrous devoted time to writing works on history and the military. He lived in Whitewater, Wisconsin.

- Watrous' Stories: A Collection of Brief Talks on Interesting Topics. Milwaukee: Milwaukee Telegraph Pub. Co., 1898. OCLC 11874070
- They Have Made Good: E. B. Wolcott Post No. 1, Grand Army of the Republic, Milwaukee Wisconsin, in Civil Life. Milwaukee: The Post, 1905. OCLC 18517630
- Richard Epps, and Other Stories. Milwaukee: Evening Wisconsin Co., 1906. OCLC 52388102.
- Memoirs of Milwaukee County: From the Earliest Historical Times Down to the Present, Including a Genealogical and Biographical Record of Representative Families in Milwaukee County. Madison, Wis.: Western Historical Association, 1909. OCLC 3347831.
- "General R. E. Lee and his uniform: a northern soldier's tribute and his protest against protesters". Milwaukee, pamphlet. Originally published in the Chicago Record Herald January 7, 1910. OCLC 16135467
- "Charles Frederick A. Zimmerman" in Transactions of the Wisconsin Academy of Sciences, Arts, and Letters] vol. 15, pt. 2, pp. 931–33. OCLC 27287362
- Civil War Regiments from Wisconsin. Federal Publishing Company, 1908. OCLC 53959965. Reprinted by Gulf Breeze, Florida: EBooksOnDisk.com, 2003. ISBN 1-932157-11-5, ISBN 978-1-932157-11-6
