= William Frisbie Watrous =

19th century American politician

W. F. Watrous
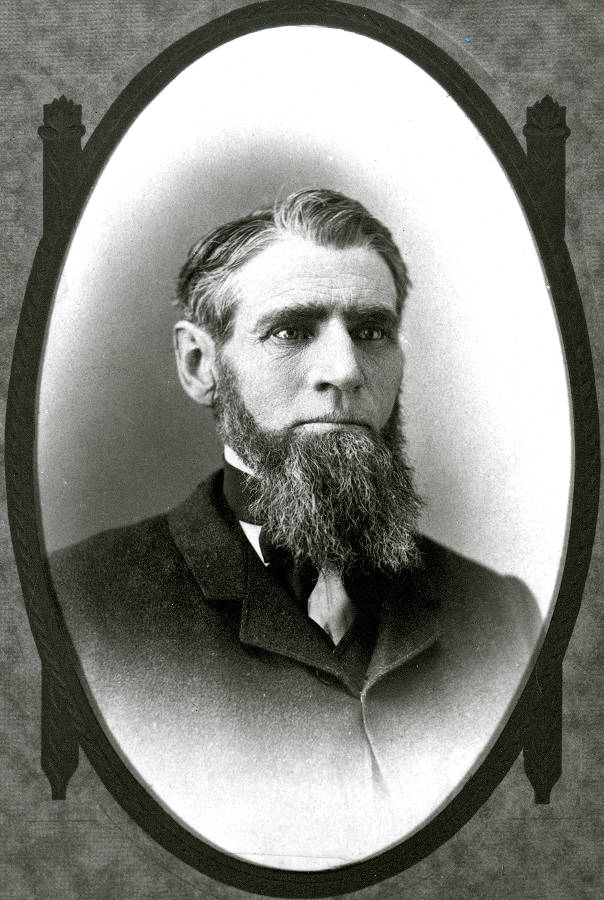

Member of the Wisconsin State Assembly from the Calumet district
- In office January 6, 1862 – January 5, 1863
- Preceded by: Le Roy Graves
- Succeeded by: James Robinson

Personal details
- Born: August 10, 1825 Bridgewater Township, Susquehanna County, Pennsylvania, U.S.
- Died: July 18, 1910 (aged 84) Fort Collins, Colorado, U.S.
- Resting place: Grandview Cemetery, Fort Collins
- Party: Democratic
- Spouse: Jane Bevier Carrier (m. 1847)
- Children: Alice M. (Patterson)^{(b. 1848; died 1921)}; William Ansel Watrous^{(b. 1854; died 1956)}; Frank Lee Watrous^{(b. 1860; died 1938)}; Anna L. Watrous^{(b. 1866; died 1953)}
- Relatives: Ansel Watrous (nephew); Jerome A. Watrous (nephew)
- Occupation: fruit farmer

William Frisbie Watrous (August 10, 1825 – July 18, 1910) was an American fruit farmer and pioneer of Wisconsin and Colorado. He was a member of the Wisconsin State Assembly, representing Calumet County during the 1862 session. He later served fourteen years on the Colorado Board of Agriculture and was instrumental in funding construction of Colorado Agricultural College.

== Biography ==
William F. Watrous was born on August 10, 1825, in Bridgewater Township, Susquehanna County, Pennsylvania. At age 6, he moved with his parents to Broome County, New York, where he was raised and educated.

In 1849, he moved west with his wife and infant daughter and settled in the heavily forested Calumet County, Wisconsin, following after his older brother Orrin J. Watrous. There, he constructed a cabin on his land and worked for years to clear trees to make space for a productive farm, where he took particular interest in growing fruit in the northern climate.

He was elected to the Wisconsin State Assembly in 1861, running on the Democratic Party ticket. He represented all of Calumet County during the 1862 session.

In 1864, he sold his land in Calumet County and moved to the town of Manitowoc, Wisconsin, where he expanded his fruit growing plans. He subsequently moved to the vicinity of Fort Collins, Colorado, where he started another large fruit orchard. He prospered in Colorado, and, in 1877 was appointed to the state board of agriculture, serving for fourteen years. While serving on the board, he participated in the project to fund and built the Colorado Agricultural College, and donated from his own funds to ensure the building was completed.

He died in his bed on the afternoon of July 18, 1910, after a long, gradual decline in health.

== Personal life and family ==
William Watrous was a son of Ansel Watrous and his wife Demis (née Luce). His older brother, Orrin, preceded him in settling in Wisconsin, but died shortly after their arrival. Their younger brother, George, brought Orrin's family back to Pennsylvania, but William and his family remained in Wisconsin at that time. Orrin's son, Jerome Anthony Watrous, would later return to Wisconsin, where he also served in the state legislature. Another son of Orrin, Ansel Watrous, served as sheriff of Calumet County during the 1860s and was a noted historian of Larimer County, Colorado.

The Watrous family were descendants of Jacob Waterhouse, who emigrated from England to the Massachusetts Bay Colony sometime before 1637.

William Watrous married Jane Bevier Carrier on November 4, 1847. They had at least four children together, who survived him.

Wisconsin State Assembly
Preceded by Le Roy Graves	Member of the Wisconsin State Assembly from the Calumet district January 6, 1862 – January 5, 1863	Succeeded by James Robinson
