= History of Larimer County, Colorado =

1922 book by Ansel Watrous

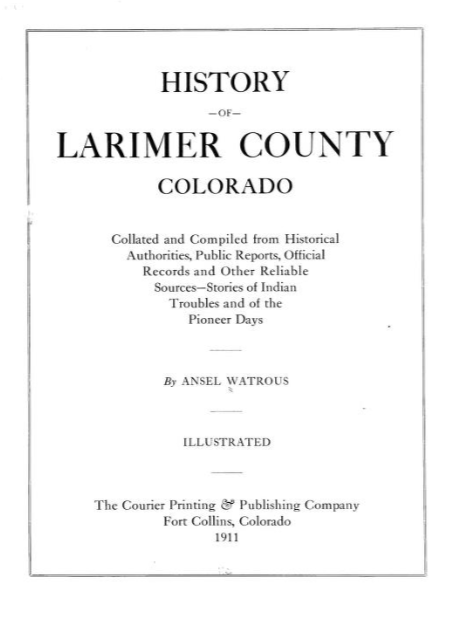
- Title page for History of Larimer County, Colorado (1911)
- Author: Ansel Watrous
- Language: English
- Genre: Non-fiction
- Publication date: 1911
- Publication place: United States

History of Larimer County, Colorado is a work of history published in 1911 by Ansel Watrous. The book was the first published comprehensive history of Larimer County, Colorado in the United States. It was republished in 1972 by the Cache la Poudre chapter of the Daughters of the American Revolution.
