= Daniel Watrous =

State politician in Alabama in the 19c

Daniel E. Watrous was a settler, lawyer, and state politician in Alabama. He served in the Alabama State Senate representing Shelby County, Alabama and Bibb County, Alabama.

He was born in Connecticut. He moved to Alabama from Vermont and became a Whig.
