= Ansel Watrous =

American newspaper editor and historian

County Clerk of Calumet County, Wisconsin
- In office January 1, 1865 – January 1, 1867
- Preceded by: J. Urmhoefer
- Succeeded by: J. H. Cook

Sheriff of Calumet County, Wisconsin
- In office January 1, 1861 – January 1, 1863
- Preceded by: Norman Breed
- Succeeded by: Daniel Lee

Personal details
- Born: November 1, 1835 Conklin, New York, U.S.
- Died: August 5, 1927 (aged 91) Fort Collins, Colorado, U.S.
- Resting place: Grandview Cemetery, Fort Collins
- Spouses: Florelle Thompson (died 1916); Helen L. Thompson (m. 1917–1927)
- Relatives: Jerome A. Watrous (brother); William F. Watrous (uncle)
- Profession: newspaper editor, historian

Ansel Watrous (November 1, 1835 – August 5, 1927) was an American newspaper publisher of the Fort Collins Courier and a historian. Born in New York, nine-year old Watrous moved with his family to Wisconsin and lived there six years until his father died of cholera. The family moved back east and Watrous was an apprentice carpenter, before returning to Wisconsin where he married and worked in construction, retail, and politics until he settled in Colorado in 1878.

A longtime resident of Fort Collins, Colorado, Watrous was a newspaper publisher, editor, and journalist. He is noted for History of Larimer County, Colorado (1911), the first comprehensive published history of the county. In retirement, he worked as a justice of the peace and continued to write articles for the newspaper.

A Forest Service campground in the Poudre Canyon in the Roosevelt National Forest northwest of Fort Collins is named for him.

== Early life ==
Ansel, named for his paternal grandfather, was born November 1, 1835, in Conklin, Broome County, New York, was the son of Jane E. (née Smith) and Orrin J. Watrous. His siblings were Henry O., Jerome Anthony, Dennis L., Eliza J., and Catharine M. Watrous. Ansel's uncle William Watrous settled in Fort Collins in 1871.

The Watrous family moved to Sheboygan Falls, Wisconsin in 1844 and four years later moved to Brothertown, Wisconsin, where Orrin ran a stage stop and hotel. After a year, he established a mill on the Manitowoc River in Charlestown, Wisconsin. Orrin died of cholera on September 10, 1850 and the family moved back to Broome County, New York. He was apprenticed to a carpenter in Brooklyn, Pennsylvania.

== Wisconsin ==
In 1855, Watrous returned to Wisconsin and worked as a carpenter. From 1861 to 1863, he was the elected Sheriff of Calumet County, Wisconsin. On July 1, 1863, Watrous registered for the draft in the Union Army in Charlestown, Calumet County, Wisconsin. From 1863 to 1866, he was the county clerk. He returned to contracting and building.

Watrous was a dry goods merchant in Charlestown in 1870. Living with them were two children: Florilla (8) and Sarah (16) Oldenbufrg. Watrous continued to work in contracting and building in Wisconsin until December 26, 1877 when he left for Colorado. His wife stayed in Wisconsion temporarily because her father was seriously ill.

== Fort Collins pioneer ==
On December 30, 1877, Watrous arrived in Fort Collins on the Colorado Central Railroad. At that time, Fort Collins was a frontier town with dirt roads and sidewalks. He worked as a clerk, at W.C. Stover's store until June 1878.

=== Newspaper editor and publisher ===
Watrous and his partner, E.M. Pelton, co-founded the Fort Collins Courier. Watrous was the editor of the paper, that issued its first edition on June 29, 1878. His partner had newspaper experience. Some people made death threats and threatened to dynamite the newspaper.

The Fort Collins Courier was printed on an old, unreliable Washington Hand Press without enough type, which was resolved by printing two pages in Chicago and two pages printed with local news in Fort Collins. The pages printed in Chicago were shipped on the railroad. Watrous was a founder of the Courier Publishing Company that had enough type to print the whole paper locally. Watrous continued as the editor of what became a daily eight-column newspaper in 1880.

In 1889, new owners became major shareholders of the Courier Printing and Publishing Company. Formerly a Democraticadd paper, it became Republican with the new owners. He stayed on as president and editor. The paper, a weekly for a period of time, grew from eight to twelve pages as the town of Fort Collins grew substantially with the turn of the century.

On March 24, 1902, the first issue of the renamed newspaper Evening Courier was published. In 1920 the newspaper was purchased by and merged with the Fort Collins Express, becoming the Express Courier. Watrous took a leave in 1910 to write his book about the history of Larimer County. He retired in 1918 or 1920. He continued to write articles in his retirement, including contribution to "Pioneer Corner" of the Sunday Express-Courier.

=== Politician and activist ===
In 1881, Watrous was appointed to the town board of trustees. He tried politics in 1882 and 1884 as a candidate for state auditor but was defeated both times.

In the early 1880s, Fort Collins was a vice-ridden town of gambling halls. Watrous is credited with making the town safer when he "waged a vigorous campaign against the underworld, and the better element backed him". He was appointed Postmaster from 1885 to 1889, during the Grover Cleveland administration. After retiring from the newspaper in 1920, Watrous served as a justice of peace for several years.

=== Historian and author ===
In 1910, Watrous completed the book History of Larimer County, Colorado, which was published in 1911. He expressed his appreciation of the area with the article "My first close up view of the Rocky Mountains".

== Personal life ==
Watrous married Florilla Thompson on December 25, 1856, in Calumet, Wisconsin. Florilla (as known as Florelle) followed Watrous to Fort Collins by 1880. They did not bear any children. Watrous and his wife had an adopted daughter, Bertha M. Pegg, who spent her childhood with them. Bertha taught school in Boulder and Fort Morgan by 1900. Pegg married Fred C. Robbins at Watrous's house in Fort Collins on February 14, 1900. Florelle was active in the pioneer society, women's clubs, and the Baptist church. Watrous and his wife were involved in local charities. Florelle died in Fort Collins on May 26, 1916. Watrous married Florelle's half-sister, Helen L. Brose on August 13, 1917. (Note: Another source stated that Florelle died in 1918 and Watrous then married Mrs. Clara Brose when he was 85 (about 1920).)

Watrous was a mason. He lived his last years and died on August 5, 1927 at the Larimer county home or at the Larimer county hospital. He had a Knights Templar funeral service and a masonic burial in the Grandview Cemetery in Fort Collins.
