= RE1 (disambiguation) =

Resident Evil is a 1996 video game and the first game in the Resident Evil series.

RE1 or RE 1 may also refer to:

- Resident Evil (2002 video game), a remake of the above game
- Resident Evil (film), the first film based on the video game series
- the NRW-Express (RE 1), a rail service in Germany
- RE1 experiment, a CERN experiment
- RE1, a chassis code for Honda CR-V (third generation)
- RE1-silencing transcription factor, a protein
- Julesburg No. Re1 School District, a school district in Colorado
- (6896) 1987 RE1, a minor planet

== See also ==
- Resident Evil (disambiguation)
