= Alvin M. Josephy Jr. =

American journalist and civil-rights activist

- Born: Alvin M. Josephy Jr. May 18, 1915
- Died: October 16, 2005 (aged 90)

Alvin M. Josephy Jr. (May 18, 1915 – October 16, 2005) was an American historian who specialized in Native American issues. New York Times reviewer Herbert Mitgang called him in 1982 the "leading non-Indian writer about Native Americans".

== Early life ==
Josephy was born in Woodmere, New York. His mother was a daughter of publisher Samuel Knopf and a sister of Alfred A. Knopf.

== Career ==
=== Early career ===
Early in his career, Josephy worked as a Hollywood screenwriter, New York City newspaper correspondent, radio station news director, the Washington Office of War Information, and in the Pacific theater as United States Marine Corps combat correspondent, where he was awarded the Bronze Star Medal for "heroic achievement in action... [making] a recording of historical significance" during the U.S. invasion of Guam. After the war, Josephy returned to Hollywood where he wrote for the movies, for a local newspaper, and for veterans groups. There he married his second wife, Elizabeth Peet. Josephy's reporting on organized crime in Santa Monica was the basis for the film The Captive City, which he co-wrote.

=== Time magazine ===
Around 1952, the Josephys moved to Greenwich, Connecticut, when Alvin joined Time magazine as photo editor. One assignment sparked his interest in the history of indigenous peoples of the Americas, especially the Nez Perce people, who lived primarily in Oregon and Idaho. He developed that interest largely in his free time.

=== American Heritage magazine ===
In 1960, he joined the American Heritage Publishing Company as a senior editor of American Heritage books, and in 1976, became editor-in-chief of American Heritage magazine, a position he served in until 1978.

=== Literary works ===
Josephy's works include The Patriot Chiefs (1961); Chief Joseph's People and Their War (1964); The Nez Perce Indians and the Opening of the Northwest (1965); The Indian Heritage of America (New York: Alfred A. Knopf, 1968); Red Power: The American Indians' Fight for Freedom (1971); and Now That the Buffalo's Gone (1982); also Black Hills, White Sky; The Civil War in the American West and History of the Congress of the United States.

=== Government advisor ===
Josephy served as a senior advisor on Federal Indian Policy to Secretary of the Interior Stewart Udall during the Kennedy Administration, and later as an advisor to President Richard Nixon on matters pertaining to Native Americans and government policies relating to Indian Tribes. He had strongly disagreed with Eisenhower Administration policies on such matters, as President Nixon came to later, in retrospect. Prior to this time, more than 100 tribes had lost federal recognition, and their land holdings under Federal policies of "termination" and forced assimilation. Based significantly on Josephy's advice and encouragement, the Nixon Administration adopted a policy of "self-determination" for Native Americans, and furthered policies and practices to encourage their cultural survival.)

== Personal life ==
Alvin and Elizabeth "Betty" Peet Josephy were married for 56 years, until her death in 2004. He died at his home in Greenwich, Connecticut, a year later. He was survived by one child from his first marriage, three from his second, and their descendants.

== Legacy ==
In Joseph, Oregon, where Alvin and Betty owned a ranch and hosted a camp for Nez Perce children, their legacy is well remembered. The Josephy Center for Arts and Culture was founded in his name. Included in the center is the Alvin M. and Betty Josephy Library of Western History and Culture, which holds much of Josephy's personal collection, as well as related materials. One of his books, The Nez Perce Indians and the Opening of the Northwest, was included on the list of 100 Oregon Books by the Oregon Cultural Heritage Commission. His papers are held at the Knight Library at the University of Oregon.

== Publications ==
=== Books ===
Book title	Date	Publisher	Subject
The Long and the Short and the Tall	1946	Knopf	U.S. Marines in the Pacific during WWII
The Patriot Chiefs	1962	Viking	Portraits of Native American leaders
Chief Joseph's People and Their War	1964	Yellowstone	A very brief version of Nez Perce history
The Nez Perce Indians and the Opening of the Northwest	1965	Yale	Comprehensive history of the Nez Perce tribe
The Indian Heritage of America	1968	Knopf (American Heritage Books)	Comprehensive overview of Indigenous Peoples of the Western Hemisphere
The Artist Was A Young Man	1970	Amon Carter Museum	Peter Rindisbacher, first artist of the Plains Indians, early 1820s
Black Hills, White Sky	1978	New York Times Books	Dakota tribes (narrative and historic photographs)
On the Hill	1979	Simon & Schuster	History of the United States Congress
Now That the Buffalo's Gone	1982	Knopf	Case studies in contemporary Native American issues (water, sovereignty, religion)
The Civil War in the American West	1991	Knopf	The American Civil War in the West
500 Nations: An Illustrated History of North American Indians	1994	Knopf	(accompanied a CBS television series)
Red Power: The American Indians' Fight for Freedom, 2nd Rev. Ed.	1999	University of Nebraska Press	Documentary history of the American Indian activist movement
A Walk Toward Oregon	2000	Knopf	Autobiography
Nez Perce Country	2007	Bison	Condensed version of Nez Perce history

=== Magazine articles ===
Magazine title	Date	Issue	Article title	Page	Subject
New York Times	March 19, 1973		"What the Indians Want"	18	Indian-US government relations & recent protests
Life	July 2, 1971	Vol 71; No. 1	"The Custer Myth"	49	The battle of Little Bighorn
Digest	October 23, 1937	Vol 1; No. 15	"Cardenas, Indian Idol"	18	Mexican President Cardena's relationship with native Indians
Ken	May 5, 1938	Vol 1; No. 3	"Bomb in a Pail of Water"	24	Interview with Leon Trotsky
American Heritage	April 1, 1958	Vol 6; No. 3	"Was America Discovered Before Columbus?"	16	Portuguese discovery of the New World by 1424
American Heritage	February 1, 1956	Vol 7; No. 2	"First 'Dude Ranch' Trip to the Untamed West"	8	Sir William Stewart's hunting party of 1843
American Heritage	February 1, 1958	Vol 9; No. 2	"The Last Stand of Chief Joseph"	36	Nez Perce's great 1,300 miles fighting retreat
American Heritage	October 1, 1960	Vol 11; No 6	"A Man to Match the Mountains"	60	David Thompson, explorer and land geographer of the New World
American Heritage	June 1, 1961	Vol 12; No 4	"Revolt in the Pueblos"	65	Pueblo uprising of 1680
American Heritage	August 1, 1961	Vol 12; No 5	"These lands are ours ..."	14	Tecumseh's leadership greatness
American Heritage	October 1, 1965	Vol 16; No 6	"A Most Satisfactory Council"	27	Walla Walla Council of 1855
American Heritage	December 1, 1966	Vol 18; No 1	"Ordeal in Hell's Canyon"	72	John Jacob Astor's fur traders' discover the chasm of Idaho's Snake River
American Heritage	December 1, 1968	Vol 20; No 1	"Cornplanter, Can You Swim?"	4	Kinzua Dam floods the Senecas' ancestral lands
American Heritage	February 1, 1970	Vol 21; No 2	"The Boy Artist of Red River"	30	Peter Rindisbacher, 19th-century artist, captured lives of Indians and white pioneers
American Heritage	June 1, 1970	Vol 21; No 4	"Here in Nevada a Terrible Crime ..."	93	Nevada's Pyramid Lake, victim of the plundering of natural resources
American Heritage	February 1, 1973	Vol 24; No 2	"The Hopi Way"	49	Traditionalists' prescription for a happier, more meaningful life & the threat of strip mining on their communities
American Heritage	February 1, 1974	Vol 25; No 2	"The Splendid Indians of Edward S. Curtis"	40	Curtis's corpus, The North American Indian
American Heritage	June 1, 1981	Vol 32; No 4	Iwo Jima	92	"Marine combat correspondent recalls the deadliest battle of the Pacific war"
American West	November 1, 1986	Vol 23; No 6	"Looking for Finegayan"	44	A marine returns to Guam
American West	January 1, 1986	Vol 23; No 1	"Andy Warhol Meets Sitting Bull"	42	Warhol's silk-screen prints, "Cowboys and Indians"
American West	July 1, 1985	Vol 22; No 4	"Those Pants that Levi Gave Us"	30	History of Levi Strauss and his world-famous pants
American West	March 1, 1984	Vol 21; No 2	"View from the West"	6	Impact of media attitude to natural resource policies
American West	May 1, 1983	Vol 20; No 3	"The Blood of Abel"	31	1863 murder of Lloyd Magruder and swift justice in frontier Idaho
American West	November 1, 1982	Vol 19; No 6	"Whose Old West Is Disappearing?"	32	Celebration of cowboys, cow ponies, and cow country
American West	September 1, 1982	Vol 19; No 5	"One Way to Spell Man"	64	Review of Wallace Stegner's One Way to Spell Man: Essays with a Western Bias
Audubon	March 1, 1976	Vol 78; No 2	"Kaiparowits: the ultimate obscenity"	64	Impact of powerplants in the four-state corner of the West
Audubon	March 1, 1975	Vol 77; No 2	"Dr. Strangelove builds a canal"	76	Impact of Bureau of Reclamation's irrigation plans on North Dakota farmers
Audubon	July 1, 1973	Vol 75; No 4	"Agony of the Northern Plains"	68	Impact on northern plains of the 1971 "North Central Power Study"
Audubon	July 1, 1971	Vol 73; No 4	"The Murder of the Southwest"	52	Impact on Indian lands of Dept. of the Interior approved strip-mining for coal
Westerners	January 1, 1971	Vol 18; No 4	"The Hudson's Bay Company and the American Indians - III"	78	History of the company's relationship with & treatment of American Indians
Westerners	January 1, 1971	Vol 18; No 3	"The Hudson's Bay Company and the American Indians - II"	59	History of the company's relationship with & treatment of American Indians
Westerners	January 1, 1971	Vol 18; No 2	"The Hudson's Bay Company and the American Indians"	28	History of the company's relationship with & treatment of American Indians
Westerners	January 1, 1968	Vol 15; No 2	"Two Gamy Letters from Fort Yuma"	28	Sylvester Mowry, Arizona pioneer
Westerners	January 1, 1968	Vol 15; No 1	"Reply to Dr. Haines"	15	Nez Perce and the Appaloosa
Westerners	January 1, 1967	Vol 14; No 4	"Nez Perces and The Appaloosa Horse ... False History:"	73	Nez Perce and the Appaloosa
Westerners	January 1, 1967	Vol 14; No 1	"Early Man in the Americas"	8	Origin of early mankind in the Americas
Westerners	January 1, 1965	Vol 12; No 3	"New Light on the Early Northwest"	49	La Gasse and Le Blanc, first white men known to have entered the Upper Basin of the Columbia River
Westerners	January 1, 1964	Vol 11; No 3	"Tom Fitzpatrick, 1848"	57	1848 letter by Tom Fitzpatrick, mountain man, emigrant guide, and Indian agent, edited by A. Josephy
Westerners	January 1, 1963	Vol 10; No 4	"Another Letter from Broken Hand"	75	1847 letter by Tom Fitzpatrick to Thomas H. Harvery, Supt. of Indian Affairs, edited by A. Josephy
Westerners	January 1, 1963	Vol 10; No 2	"A Letter from Broken Hand"	25	1847 letter by Tom Fitzpatrick, early Indian agent appointed to the western plains, edited by A. Josephy
Westerners	January 1, 1962	Vol 9; No 3	"The Funeral of Peter Dan Moses"	64	The funeral of Peter Dan Moses marked the passing of another colorful, prominent NW Indian leader
Westerners	January 1, 1958	Vol 4; No 4	"The Lolo Trail"	82	Trader-explorer David Thompson and the history of Lolo Trail
Atlantic	June 1, 1970	Vol 225; No 6	"Indians in History"	67	White historians' failure to know Indian history and nature
Blue Book	June 1, 1951	Vol 93; No 2	"Condors Don't Pay Taxes"	52	California condor
Great Plains Journal	September 1, 1969		"Everybody's Talking"	1	Historians, challenges and role
Montana	October 1, 1955	Vol 5; No 4	"The Naming of the Nez Perce"	1	History of the naming of the Nez Perce
Natural History	February 1, 1977	Vol 86; No 2	"A Sojourn Among the Indians"	94	Review of People of the First Man, edited by Davis Thomas and Karin Ronnefeldt
Journal of the West	June 1, 2000	Vol 39; No 3	"A Responsibility of Western Historians"	6	Avoiding stereotypes to provide a true knowledge of transition from Old West to New West
Journal	March 1, 1985	Vol 4; No 1	"The Blood of Abel"	4	1863 murder of Lloyd Magruder and swift justice in frontier Idaho
Idaho Yesterdays	March 1, 1962	Vol 6; No 1	"Origins of the Nez Perce People"	2	Aboriginal wanders from Asia settled among Clearwater, Salmon, and Wallowa Country
On the Sound	January 1, 1972	Vol 2; No 1	"120 Centuries of a Noble Heritage, Part 1"	80	History of American Indians along Long Island Sound
On the Sound	February 1, 1972	Vol 2; No 2	"Indians of the Sound, Part 2"	72	History of American Indians of Long Island Sound from the 17th century on
Oregon Humanities	December 1, 1992		"In Search of the Old West"	2	A. Josephy reflects on the transitioning Old West beginning with his 1934 cross-country bus ride
Proceedings	September 1, 1978		"Keynote Address"	2	A. Josephy's speech to conference of environmentalists and sheep producers
Smithsonian	July 1, 1976	Vol 7; No 4	"Book Recommendations"	127	A. Josephy recommends The Closing Circle by Barry Commoner
American West	September 1, 1972	Vol 9; No 5	"By Fayre and Gentle Means"	4	The Hudson's Bay Company and the American Indian
Critic	September 1, 1973	Vol 32; No 1	"Freedom for the American Indian"	18	Summary of Indian-White relations since earliest contact
Col. Heinl 1982 Mem. Award	January 1, 1982		"Iwo Jima"	37	Marine combat correspondent recalls deadliest battle of the Pacific war
History News	June 1, 1982	Vol 37; No 6	"Awesome Space"	26	Speculations on interpretations of the Old West
Western Historical Quarterly	March 1, 1995	Vol 26; No 1	"I Have Seen the Elephant"	4	Presidential address at Western History Association's 34th annual conference
