= Virginia Dale, Colorado =

- Unincorporated community
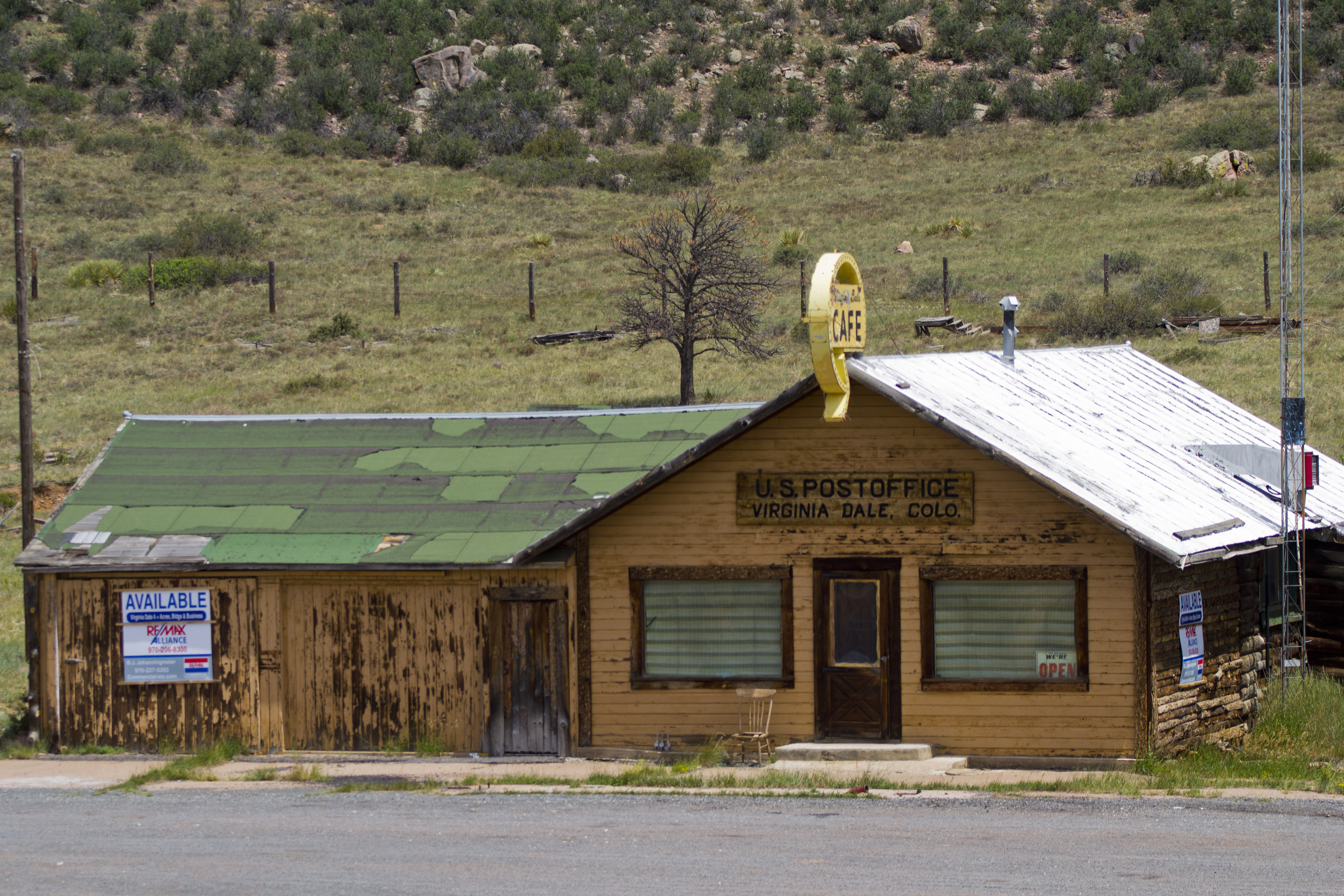
- Shuttered cafe and post office in Virginia Dale

- Location in Colorado Location in the United States
- Coordinates: 40°57′17″N 105°20′57″W
- Country: United States
- State: Colorado
- County: Larimer County
- Founded: 1862
- Founder: Jack Slade
- Elevation: 7,034 ft (2,144 m)
- Time zone: UTC-7 (MST)
  - Summer (DST): UTC-6 (MDT)
- ZIP code: 80536 (Livermore)
- Area code: 970
- GNIS feature ID: 0170131

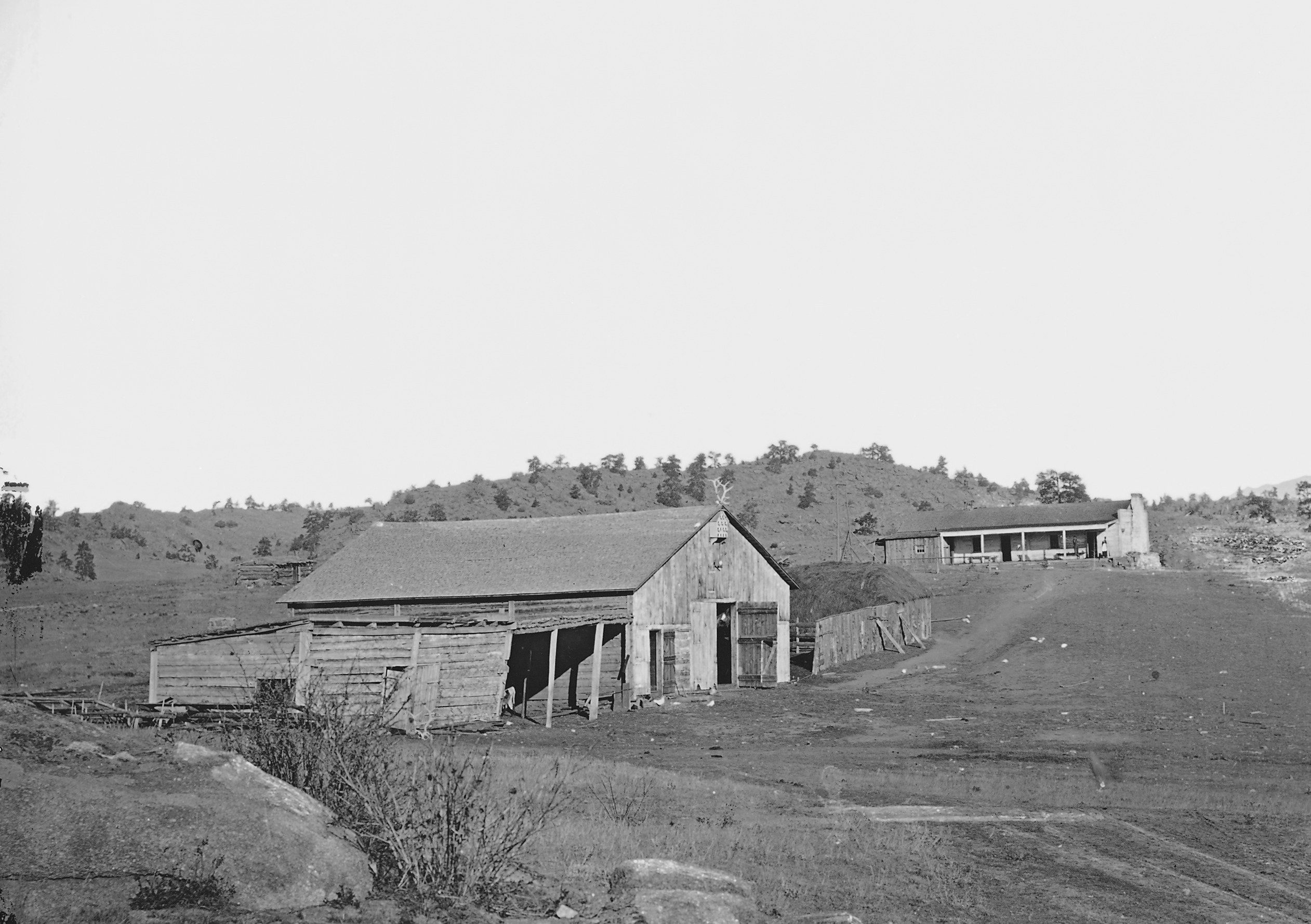
Robber's Roost at Virginia Dale. Photo by William Henry Jackson. At one time the home of Slade, a notorious character of the times

Virginia Dale is a tiny unincorporated community located in northwestern Larimer County, Colorado, United States. Virginia Dale is situated in the foothills of the Rocky Mountains on U.S. Highway 287, approximately 45 mi (72 km) northwest of Ft. Collins and approximately 4 mi (6 km) south of the Wyoming border. In the late 19th century, Virginia Dale was a famous stop on the Overland Trail. The stage station, the last of its kind still standing, and its associated home, the Hurzeler House, are owned and maintained by the Virginia Dale Community Club.

== Overland Trail stage station ==
The Virginia Dale stage station was established in 1862 by Jack Slade, former station manager at Julesburg, Colorado where he famously got into a dispute with Jules Beni. Beni had previously shot Slade five times but Slade survived and exacted his revenge by ambushing Beni, tying him to a fencepost and shooting off his fingers before delivering a coup de grace to the head. Slade kept Beni's ears as trophies. While station master in Julesburg, Slade met and breakfasted with Samuel Clemens, "Mark Twain" and made quite an impression upon Twain. Twain wrote about his encounter with Slade in his 1872 publication "Roughing It".

When Ben Holladay took over the Overland Stage in 1862, he changed the route, taking it south from Julesburg along the South Platte River to Greeley and then up the old Cherokee Trail through Latham, LaPorte, Virginia Dale, Colorado, and into Wyoming.

Virginia Dale was a "home station" on the Overland Trail, meaning that passengers could disembark, get a meal, and stay overnight in a hotel if the stage was delayed by weather or nightfall. Thirty to fifty horses were kept at the station which was located in a pleasant, grassy glade (or "dale") along a clear bubbling stream, later named Dale Creek. Slade probably named the post after his wife Virginia, whose maiden name might have been "Dale". Slade was an excellent stage manager as long as he stayed sober. Many stories credit him with outrageous actions from shooting up a saloon in LaPorte for serving his stage drivers whiskey, or for having "a fondness of shooting canned goods off grocery store shelves" to robbing the stage of $60,000 in gold, which later disappeared. Slade was fired as stage manager in November, 1862 after a drunken shooting spree at nearby Fort Halleck and left with his wife for Virginia City, Montana where he was hanged in early 1864 by angry miners.

The Virginia Dale stage station hosted many famous travelers such as author Albert D. Richardson ("Beyond the Mississippi") and an Illinois governor, probably Richard Yates. Samuel Bowles, editor of the Massachusetts Republican wrote in 1865,

"Virginia Dale deserves its pretty name. A pearly, lively-looking stream runs through a beautiful basin of perhaps one hundred acres, among the mountains - for we are within the entrances of one of the great hills-stretching away in smooth and rising pasture to nooks and crannies of the wooded range; fronted by rock embankment, and flanked by the snowy peaks themselves; warm with the June sun, and rare with an air into which no fetid breath has poured itself-it is difficult to imagine a loveable spot in Nature's kingdom."

The station itself was built with timber cut by Hiram 'Hi" Kelly, one of the first profitable cattle ranchers in the Laramie area.

In 1865 future Vice President Schuyler Colfax (then Speaker of the US House of Representatives) was detained at the post by Native American raids. It is possible that Virginia Dale served briefly as a telegraph station.

== Settlement ==
After the construction of the Union Pacific Railroad in 1867, the stage stop was abandoned. Settlers began moving into the area in 1872, establishing the first school in 1874. The first church was built in 1880. The community was formerly the site of a post office and cafe along Highway 287 until the 1990s, when the cafe and post office were shut down. The area continues to be a region of cattle ranching. The original 1874 school still stands along U.S. Highway 287 and the original stage station still stands a short distance east of the highway. The U.S. Post Office at Livermore (ZIP Code 80536) now serves Virginia Dale postal addresses.

== Historical marker ==
Click on the image (up to twice) to enlarge it.

The settlement is memorialized by a bronze plaque just off U.S. 287 on the easterly side (about a mile north of the school and a few hundred yards north of the abandoned post office). The plaque reads as follows:

THIS MEMORIAL IS THE PROPERTY OF THE STATE OF COLORADO.
---
THREE-QUARTERS OF A MILE NORTHWEST FROM THIS POINT IS THE ORIGINAL VIRGINIA DALE. FAMOUS STAGE STATION ON THE OVERLAND ROUTE TO CALIFORNIA, 1862-1867. ESTABLISHED BY JOSEPH A. (JACK) SLADE AND NAMED FOR HIS WIFE, VIRGINIA. LOCATED ON THE CHEROKEE TRAIL OF 1849. FAVORITE CAMP GROUND FOR EMIGRANTS. VICE PRESIDENT COLFAX AND PARTY WERE DETAINED HERE BY INDIAN RAIDS IN 1865. ROBERT J. SPOTSWOOD REPLACED SLADE.
---
ERECTED BY THE STATE HISTORICAL SOCIETY OF COLORADO FROM THE MRS. J. N. HALL FOUNDATION AND BY THE FORT COLLINS PIONEER SOCIETY, 1935.

== Climate ==
According to the Köppen Climate Classification system, Virginia Dale has a warm-summer humid continental climate, abbreviated "Dfb" on climate maps. The hottest temperature recorded in Virginia Dale was 98 °F (37 °C) on August 3, 2026, while the coldest temperature recorded was −30 °F (−34 °C) on February 5, 2014.

Climate data for Virginia Dale, Colorado, 1991–2020 normals, extremes 1995–present
Month	Jan	Feb	Mar	Apr	May	Jun	Jul	Aug	Sep	Oct	Nov	Dec	Year
Record high °F (°C)	65 (18)	65 (18)	83 (28)	81 (27)	89 (32)	97 (36)	97 (36)	98 (37)	94 (34)	83 (28)	71 (22)	67 (19)	98 (37)
Mean maximum °F (°C)	54.9 (12.7)	56.2 (13.4)	66.1 (18.9)	72.4 (22.4)	79.2 (26.2)	89.8 (32.1)	91.5 (33.1)	90.7 (32.6)	87.1 (30.6)	76.3 (24.6)	65.7 (18.7)	55.3 (12.9)	93.6 (34.2)
Mean daily maximum °F (°C)	38.3 (3.5)	38.6 (3.7)	46.9 (8.3)	52.7 (11.5)	61.8 (16.6)	74.1 (23.4)	81.3 (27.4)	79.8 (26.6)	71.5 (21.9)	57.2 (14.0)	45.1 (7.3)	37.5 (3.1)	57.1 (13.9)
Daily mean °F (°C)	26.9 (−2.8)	26.8 (−2.9)	34.3 (1.3)	39.8 (4.3)	48.6 (9.2)	58.7 (14.8)	65.5 (18.6)	64.0 (17.8)	55.9 (13.3)	43.5 (6.4)	33.3 (0.7)	26.3 (−3.2)	43.6 (6.5)
Mean daily minimum °F (°C)	15.5 (−9.2)	15.0 (−9.4)	21.6 (−5.8)	26.9 (−2.8)	35.3 (1.8)	43.3 (6.3)	49.7 (9.8)	48.2 (9.0)	40.2 (4.6)	29.7 (−1.3)	21.6 (−5.8)	15.0 (−9.4)	30.2 (−1.0)
Mean minimum °F (°C)	−7.3 (−21.8)	−9.6 (−23.1)	2.6 (−16.3)	12.9 (−10.6)	21.5 (−5.8)	33.7 (0.9)	41.7 (5.4)	37.9 (3.3)	28.0 (−2.2)	12.7 (−10.7)	2.7 (−16.3)	−9.8 (−23.2)	−17.9 (−27.7)
Record low °F (°C)	−21 (−29)	−30 (−34)	−19 (−28)	−6 (−21)	5 (−15)	26 (−3)	33 (1)	32 (0)	17 (−8)	−4 (−20)	−18 (−28)	−25 (−32)	−30 (−34)
Average precipitation inches (mm)	0.49 (12)	0.58 (15)	1.09 (28)	2.26 (57)	2.52 (64)	2.05 (52)	2.57 (65)	1.63 (41)	1.86 (47)	1.12 (28)	0.72 (18)	0.52 (13)	17.41 (440)
Average snowfall inches (cm)	9.1 (23)	10.9 (28)	14.9 (38)	19.1 (49)	7.9 (20)	0.2 (0.51)	0.0 (0.0)	0.0 (0.0)	1.5 (3.8)	8.3 (21)	9.9 (25)	10.2 (26)	92.0 (234)
Average precipitation days (≥ 0.01 in)	5.2	6.3	7.0	9.2	11.7	10.7	12.0	12.3	8.4	7.0	5.1	5.9	100.8
Average snowy days (≥ 0.1 in)	5.8	6.8	6.9	7.2	2.9	0.2	0.0	0.0	0.6	3.8	5.4	6.4	46.0
Source 1: NOAA
Source 2: National Weather Service (mean maxima and minima 2006–2020)

== See also ==
- Willow Springs, Wyoming next stop on the Overland Trail.
- Stonewall Creek Cherokee Station stop before on the Overland Trail.
- Bibliography of Colorado
- Geography of Colorado
- History of Colorado
- Index of Colorado-related articles
- List of Colorado-related lists
  - List of ghost towns in Colorado
  - List of post offices in Colorado
- Outline of Colorado
