= Paul Newlan =

American actor (1903–1973)

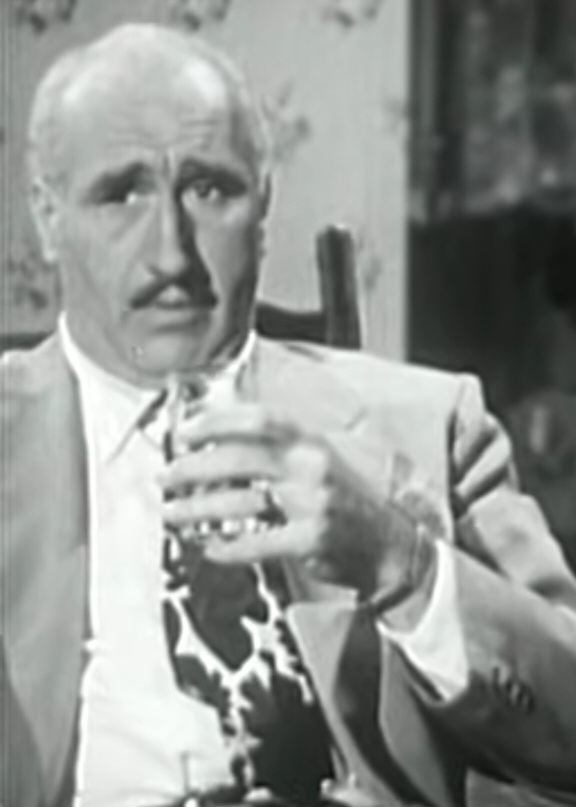
- Newlan in I'm from Arkansas (1944)
- Born: Paul Emory "Tiny" Newlan; June 29, 1903; Plattsmouth, Nebraska, U.S.
- Died: November 23, 1973 (aged 70); Studio City, California, U.S.
- Resting place: Coyle Cemetery Logan County, Oklahoma
- Occupation: Actor
- Years active: 1920–1971

Paul Emory "Tiny" Newlan (June 29, 1903 – November 23, 1973) was an American film and TV character actor from Plattsmouth, Nebraska. He was best known for his role as Captain Grey on the NBC police series M Squad and for his roles in films including The Americanization of Emily and The Slender Thread.

== Career ==
Early in his career, Newlan worked in Vaudeville, sometimes doing as many as 10 shows a day.

Newlan appeared in dozens of films and TV shows between 1935 and 1971. Among his other film roles were My Favorite Spy, The Captive City, The Great Adventures of Captain Kidd and The Buccaneer, in addition to smaller roles in numerous other films including Abbott and Costello Meet Captain Kidd, Abbott and Costello Go to Mars, You're Never Too Young, We're No Angels, and To Catch a Thief.

On March 4, 1955, Newlan appeared as the outlaw Jules Beni in an episode of Jim Davis's syndicated western series Stories of the Century. Gregg Palmer played Jack Slade, the superintendent of the Central Overland California and Pikes Peak Express Company, in Julesburg, Colorado, who sets out to capture Beni.

Newlan portrayed Big Harpe on the miniseries Davy Crockett and General Prichard on the ABC war series Twelve O'Clock High. He also made appearances on series such as Gunsmoke (as outlaw “Danch” in the 1956 S2E11 offering “Spring Term”), The Deputy, Thriller (4 episodes), Wagon Train and most notable the 1964 Twilight Zone episode "The Brain Center at Whipple's". In 1965 he played Andy Handshaw, a retired US Forest Service Ranger, in the TV series Lassie episode "Lassie and the Seagull" (Season 12, Ep.4). His final credit was in 1971 on Robert Young's Marcus Welby M.D.

== Death ==
Newlan died of congestive heart failure on November 23, 1973, in Studio City, California. He is interred in Coyle Cemetery, Logan County, Oklahoma.

== Selected filmography ==
- Millions in the Air (1935) – Charles Haines
- Too Many Parents (1936) – Fields (uncredited)
- Forgotten Faces (1936) – Guard
- The Plainsman (1936) – Man Getting Whipped on Wrist (uncredited)
- The Accusing Finger (1936) – Prisoner (uncredited)
- Arizona Mahoney (1936) – Boots
- Man of the People (1937) – Hobo (uncredited)
- Murder Goes to College (1937) – Mike, Night Club Doorman (uncredited)
- Swing High, Swing Low (1937) – Army Lieutenant (uncredited)
- The Last Train from Madrid (1937) – Turnkey (uncredited)
- Mountain Music (1937) – Bearded Hillbilly (uncredited)
- Wake Up and Live (1937) – Cop (uncredited)
- Big City (1937) – Comet Cab Driver (uncredited)
- My Dear Miss Aldrich (1937) – Husky Man (scenes deleted)
- The Lady Fights Back (1937) – Guide (uncredited)
- Carnival Queen (1937) – Husky Man (uncredited)
- Prescription for Romance (1937) – Bearded Hungarian (uncredited)
- Wells Fargo (1937) – Zachary 'Zeke' Martin (uncredited)
- The Big Broadcast of 1938 (1938) – Member of the Black Gang (uncredited)
- Cocoanut Grove (1938) – Tourist in Trailer Camp (uncredited)
- You and Me (1938) – Bouncer at Danceland (uncredited)
- If I Were King (1938) – Beggar (uncredited)
- Say It in French (1938) – Customs Inspector (uncredited)
- Disbarred (1939) – Prowler (uncredited)
- I'm from Missouri (1939) – Attendant (uncredited)
- Broadway Serenade (1939) – Big Man with Female Voice (uncredited)
- The Lady's from Kentucky (1939) – Gambler (uncredited)
- The Gracie Allen Murder Case (1939) – Fred (uncredited)
- Fast and Furious (1939) – AngryRoom Service Giant (uncredited)
- Rulers of the Sea (1939) – Second Stoker (uncredited)
- Another Thin Man (1939) – Tom—Bodyguard (uncredited)
- Balalaika (1939) – Policeman (uncredited)
- The Hunchback of Notre Dame (1939) – Whipper (uncredited)
- Hidden Enemy (1940) – German Agent (uncredited)
- Those Were the Days! (1940) – First Hobo (uncredited)
- The Ghost Breakers (1940) – Baggage Handler (uncredited)
- The Great McGinty (1940) – Prisoner Demanding Quiet (uncredited)
- Rangers of Fortune (1940) – Water Thug (uncredited)
- North West Mounted Police (1940) – Indian (uncredited)
- The Gay Vagabond (1941) – Lobang
- Hold That Ghost (1941) – Big Fink (uncredited)
- Down in San Diego (1941) – Tough Waiter (uncredited)
- Honky Tonk (1941) – Gentleman (uncredited)
- Sea Raiders (1941, Serial) – Chris – Second Island Guard [Chs. 11–12] (uncredited)
- Sullivan's Travels (1941) – Truck Driver (uncredited)
- A Date with the Falcon (1942) – Policeman at Federal Hotel (uncredited)
- Down Rio Grande Way (1942) – Sam Houston
- The Spoilers (1942) – Miner (uncredited)
- The Devil's Trail (1942) – Blacksmith Ed Dawson
- Jackass Mail (1942) – Rancher with Gun on Baggot (uncredited)
- You Can't Escape Forever (1942) – Louie – Greer's Henchman (uncredited)
- Star Spangled Rhythm (1942) – Stage Door Guard (uncredited)
- Hit Parade of 1943 (1943) – Jim, the Doorman (uncredited)
- Du Barry Was a Lady (1943) – Marching Rebel on King Louis' Left (uncredited)
- Crazy House (1943) – Strong Man (uncredited)
- The Phantom (1943, Serial) – Cates (uncredited)
- True to Life (1943) – Stage Doorkeeper (uncredited)
- The Adventures of Mark Twain (1944) – Boss Deck Hand (uncredited)
- The Great Moment (1944) – Policeman (uncredited)
- Girl Rush (1944) – Big Bearded Miner (uncredited)
- I'm from Arkansas (1944) – Farmer
- Lost in a Harem (1944) – Guard (uncredited)
- The Man Who Walked Alone (1945) – Officer #2
- The Clock (1945) – Garbage Man (uncredited)
- Bedside Manner (1945) – Patient in Office (uncredited)
- Within These Walls (1945) – Guard (uncredited)
- The Shanghai Cobra (1945) – Big Bank Guard (uncredited)
- Road to Utopia (1945) – Tough Ship's Purser (uncredited)
- The Harvey Girls (1946) – Station Agent (uncredited)
- A Letter for Evie (1946) – Policeman (uncredited)
- Fear (1946) – Primary Bartender at Sea Hawk (uncredited)
- Two Sisters from Boston (1946) – Eddie – Stagehand (uncredited)
- Don Ricardo Returns (1946) – Lugo the Huge
- Bells of San Fernando (1947) – Gueyon, Garcia's Assistant
- Monsieur Verdoux (1947) – Garden Party Guest (uncredited)
- A Likely Story (1947) – Truck Driver (uncredited)
- High Barbaree (1947) – Truckman (uncredited)
- Copacabana (1947) – Owner – Genevieve the Seal (uncredited)
- The Secret Life of Walter Mitty (1947) – Truck Driver (uncredited)
- Dragnet (1947) – Henchman
- The Unfinished Dance (1947) – Electrician (uncredited)
- Road to Rio (1947) – Butcher (uncredited)
- Fury at Furnace Creek (1948) – Joe (uncredited)
- Four Faces West (1948) – Deputy (uncredited)
- A Southern Yankee (1948) – Man with Saber (uncredited)
- The Three Musketeers (1948) – Musketeer Guard (uncredited)
- Force of Evil (1948) – Policeman #2 (uncredited)
- The Fountainhead (1949) – Policeman (uncredited)
- Miss Grant Takes Richmond (1949) – Hood (uncredited)
- The Inspector General (1949) – Viertel – the Woodchopper (uncredited)
- Wabash Avenue (1950) – Bouncer (uncredited)
- Colt .45 (1950) – Townsman (uncredited)
- Love That Brute (1950) – Police Sergeant (uncredited)
- Bright Leaf (1950) – Blacksmith (uncredited)
- Never a Dull Moment (1950) – Hunter (uncredited)
- Sierra Passage (1950) – Bartender (uncredited)
- Sugarfoot (1951) – Barfly With Jones (uncredited)
- The Lemon Drop Kid (1951) – Taxi Driver (uncredited)
- David and Bathsheba (1951) – Samuel (uncredited)
- The Barefoot Mailman (1951) – Boat Captain (uncredited)
- Callaway Went Thataway (1951) – Cowboy Actor on Frontier Town set (uncredited)
- Cave of Outlaws (1951) – McNulty (uncredited)
- My Favorite Spy (1951) – Tangier Policeman (uncredited)
- The Treasure of Lost Canyon (1952) – Coach Driver (uncredited)
- Rancho Notorious (1952) – Deputy in Gunsight (uncredited)
- Something to Live For (1952) – Bartender (uncredited)
- The Captive City (1952) – Krug
- The World in His Arms (1952) – Tough Sailor (uncredited)
- Lost in Alaska (1952) – Capt. Chisholm (uncredited)
- The Raiders (1952) – Bartender (uncredited)
- Against All Flags (1952) – Crop-ear Collins (uncredited)
- Abbott and Costello Meet Captain Kidd (1952) – Pub Owner (uncredited)
- The Lawless Breed (1953) – Racetrack Judge (uncredited)
- Abbott and Costello Go to Mars (1953) – Traffic Cop (uncredited)
- Sangaree (1953) – Medical Board (uncredited)
- The Vanquished (1953) – Blacksmith (uncredited)
- Powder River (1953) – Miner (uncredited)
- The Great Adventures of Captain Kidd (1953, Serial) – Long Ben Avery [Chs. 10–13]
- Prisoners of the Casbah (1953) – 1st Thief
- Casanova's Big Night (1954) – Regniacci (uncredited)
- Drums of Tahiti (1954) – Captain (uncredited)
- River of No Return (1954) – Prospector (uncredited)
- Demetrius and the Gladiators (1954) – Potter (uncredited)
- Naked Alibi (1954) – Charlie (uncredited)
- Prince of Players (1955) – Western Man Backstage (uncredited)
- Pirates of Tripoli (1955) – Hammid Khassan
- Jupiter's Darling (1955) – Roman Captain (uncredited)
- We're No Angels (1955) – Port Captain (uncredited)
- You're Never Too Young (1955) – Husky Man at Train Station (uncredited)
- To Catch a Thief (1955) – Vegetable Man in Kitchen (uncredited)
- The Court Jester (1955) – Soldier / Guard (uncredited)
- The Rack (1956) – Big Frank – Surprise Party Guest (uncredited)
- Badlands of Montana (1957) – Marshal at Helena
- The Lonely Man (1957) – Fence Green
- Trooper Hook (1957) – Mr. Wilson
- The Tijuana Story (1957) – Peron Diaz
- Ride a Crooked Trail (1958) – Riverboat Captain (uncredited)
- The Buccaneer (1958) – Capt. Flint
- Pocketful of Miracles (1961) – Hood (uncredited)
- The Americanization of Emily (1964) – Gen. William Hallerton
- The Slender Thread (1965) – Sgt. Harry Ward
- The Arrangement (1969) – Mr. Meyer (uncredited)
- There Was a Crooked Man... (1970) – (uncredited)
