= Clayton Thyne =

American political scientist (born 1978)

Dean of West Virginia University's Eberly College of Arts and Sciences
- Incumbent
- Assumed office July 1, 2026
- Preceded by: Gregory Dunaway

Personal details
- Born: Clayton Lynn Thyne; 1978 (age 47–48) Julesburg, Colorado, US
- Scientific career
- Education: University of Nebraska at Kearney (BA); University of St. Thomas (MEd); University of Iowa (MA, PhD)
- Fields: Political science
- Workplaces: University of Kentucky; West Virginia University
- Thesis: Cheap Signals, Costly Consequences: How International Relations Affect Civil Conflict (2007)
- Doctoral advisor: Sara McLaughlin Mitchell

Clayton Lynn Thyne (born 1978) is an American political scientist and academic administrator.

== Early life and education ==
Thyne was born in 1978, raised in Julesburg, Colorado, and competed in track and field for the Julesburg School District. He studied political science and graduated from the University of Nebraska at Kearney in 2001 with a Bachelor of Arts, then earned a Master of Education at the University of St. Thomas of Houston, Texas in 2003, followed by a Master of Arts and PhD, both in political science, at the University of Iowa in 2004 and 2007, respectively.

== Career ==
Thyne began his academic career at the University of Kentucky, eventually serving as chair of the political science department and associate dean of academic affairs. In April 2026, Thyne was appointed the first Linda and Don Brodie Dean of West Virginia University's Eberly College of Arts and Sciences, replacing Gregory Dunaway.
