= Amy S. Thompson =

American linguist (born 1979)

Amy Suzanne Thompson (born 1979) is an American linguist who is Mack and Effie Campbell Distinguished Professor at Florida State University.

== Education ==
Thompson earned a Bachelor of Arts degree in French from Texas Christian University in 2001, and a master's degree in Teaching English to speakers of other languages in 2005 and a PhD in Second language studies from Michigan State University in 2009. Her doctoral dissertation, "The Multilingual/Bilingual Dichotomy: An Exploration of Individual Differences", was advised by Paula Winke.

== Career ==
Thompson began her career as an assistant professor at the University of South Florida, was promoted to associate professor in 2014, and joined the West Virginia University faculty in 2018 as Woodburn Professor of Applied Linguistics and chair of the Department of World Languages, Literatures and Linguistics. She became director of international relations and strategic planning for the university's Eberly College of Arts and Sciences in 2021. In 2023, Thompson was one of four finalists for the deanship of the Iowa State University College of Liberal Arts and Sciences. In 2024, Thompson joined Florida State University as Mack and Effie Campbell Distinguished Professor and Director of the School of Teacher Education. She also received the Distinguished Service to the Profession Award from the Modern Language Association's Association of Language Departments.

== Selected publications ==
- Thompson, Amy S. (2021). The Role of Context in Language Teachers' Self Development and Motivation: Perspectives from Multilingual Settings. Bristol: Multilingual Matters. ISBN 9781800411173.
- Lanvers, Ursula; Thompson, Amy S.; East, Martin, eds. (2022). Language Learning in Anglophone Countries: Challenges, Practices, Ways Forward. Basingstoke: Palgrave Macmillan. doi:10.1007/978-3-030-56654-8. ISBN 9783030566531. S2CID 243000303. ResearchGate:348302850
