= Dale L. Smith =

American scholar

- Education: Massachusetts Institute of Technology (PhD)
- Scientific career
- Thesis: Linking the Foreign Policy Process to International Action: A Formal and Empirical Analysis of Policy Dynamics (1987)
- Doctoral students: Emilia Justyna Powell

Dale L. Smith is an American political scientist and Professor of International Studies and Chair of Global Studies at the University of North Carolina Charlotte. He was Paul Piccard Distinguished Professor of Political Science at Florida State University between September 2014 and June 2016.
