= The Role of Context in Language Teachers' Self Development and Motivation =

- Author: Amy S. Thompson
- Language: English
- Series: Psychology of Language Learning and Teaching
- Release number: 13
- Subject: English as a foreign language
- Published: 2021
- Publisher: Multilingual Matters
- Media type: Print (hardback), ebook
- Pages: 176
- ISBN: 9781800411173

The Role of Context in Language Teachers' Self Development and Motivation: Perspectives from Multilingual Settings is an academic book by Amy S. Thompson published in 2021 by Multilingual Matters. It discusses the teaching of English, especially as a foreign language. Reviewers recommended it to interested audiences, finding value in the research and methods.

== Description ==
The book includes a foreword by Tammy Gregersen.

The main book begins with some background including citing prior research.

The bulk of the text discusses examples of teaching English as a foreign language in various contexts. Example contexts studied in the book include national settings like Senegal, Egypt, Argentina Turkey, Ukraine, Estonia and Vietnam.

It ends with conclusions around "English as a global language", teaching, teachers, and other topics.

== Reception ==
Multiple reviews recommended the book to specific audiences who may be interested in the subject matter.

Reviewers noted a demonstrated degree of reliability and novelty in the empirical research, highlighting the author's ability to find insights in her participants' stories, and finding value in the qualitative approach.
