= Islamic Law and International Law =

2020 book by Emilia Justyna Powell

Islamic Law and International Law: Peaceful Settlement of Disputes
- Author: Emilia Justyna Powell
- Language: English
- Subject: international law
- Publisher: Oxford University Press
- Publication date: 2020
- Publication place: United Kingdom
- Media type: Print (Hardcover) and Ebook
- ISBN: 9780190064631

Islamic Law and International Law: Peaceful Settlement of Disputes is a 2020 book by the American political scientist Emilia Justyna Powell, in which the author examines the presence of Islamic law-related arguments in the jurisprudence of the International Court of Justice.

== Reception ==
The book has been reviewed in International Community Law Review, Journal of Peace Research, International Studies Review, Review of Economics and Political Science and Southeast European and Black Sea Studies.
