= Sara McLaughlin Mitchell =

American political scientist (born 1969)

- Born: June 28, 1969 (age 57)
- Citizenship: American
- Education: Michigan State University (PhD)
- Awards: Collegiate Scholar Award, Faculty Scholar Award
- Scientific career
- Fields: International relations
- Workplaces: University of Iowa; Florida State University
- Thesis: The Systemic Democratic Peace
- Doctoral students: Clayton Thyne
- Website: www.saramitchell.org

Sara McLaughlin Mitchell (born June 28, 1969) is an American political scientist and the F. Wendell Miller Professor of Political Science at University of Iowa. She is known for her expertise on international relations and political methodology.

== Education ==
Mitchell received her B.S. in economics and political science from Iowa State University in 1991 and her Ph.D in political science from Michigan State University in 1997. Her areas of expertise include international conflict, political methodology, and gender issues in academia. She is co-founder of the Journeys in World Politics workshop, a mentoring workshop for junior women studying international relations.

Prior to joining the University of Iowa in 2004, she taught at Florida State University.

== Books ==
- Domestic Law Goes Global: Legal Traditions and International Courts (with Emilia Justyna Powell), Cambridge University Press 2011
- Guide to the Scientific Study of International Processes (Wiley-Blackwell 2012)
- The Triumph of Democracy and the Eclipse of the West (Palgrave Macmillan 2013)
- Conflict, War, and Peace: An Introduction to Scientific Research (CQ Press/Sage 2013)
- What Do We Know About Civil Wars? (Rowman Littlfield 2016)
