= Herman J. C. Beckemeyer =

American lawyer and politician

Member of the Illinois House of Representatives
- In office 1907–1911

Personal details
- Born: January 21, 1878 Clinton County, Illinois, U.S.
- Died: April 8, 1930 (aged 52) Carlyle, Illinois, U.S.
- Party: Democratic
- Education: University of Illinois Urbana-Champaign; McKendree University; University of Missouri
- Occupation: Politician, lawyer

Herman J. C. Beckemeyer (January 21, 1878 – April 8, 1930) was an American lawyer and politician.

Beckemeyer was born in Clinton County, Illinois. He went to University of Illinois at Urbana–Champaign and McKendree University. Beckemeyer also went to the Missouri College of Law. He practiced law in Carlyle, Illinois. Beckemeyer served in the Illinois House of Representatives from 1907 to 1911 and was a Democrat. He also served as mayor of Carlyle. Beckemeyer died at his home in Carlyle, Illinois.
