= General Dean Suspension Bridge =

- U.S. National Register of Historic Places
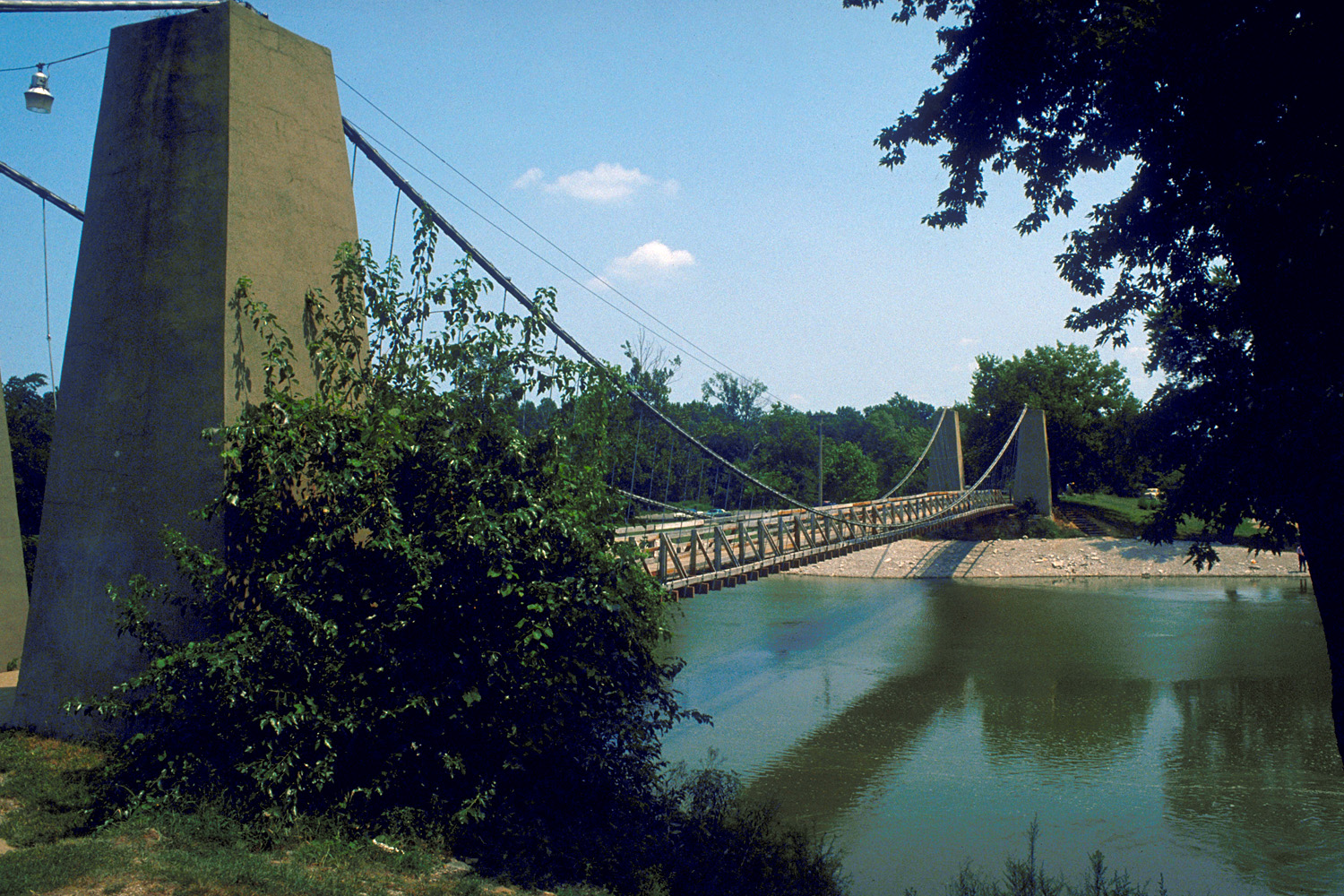
- The General Dean Suspension Bridge, ca. 2000

- Location within Illinois Location within the United States
- Nearest city: Carlyle, Illinois
- Coordinates: 38°36′40″N 89°21′28″W
- Area: 0.3 acres (0.12 ha)
- Built: 1859; 167 years ago
- Engineer: P. Griffith Smith
- NRHP reference No.: 73000693
- Added to NRHP: April 3, 1973

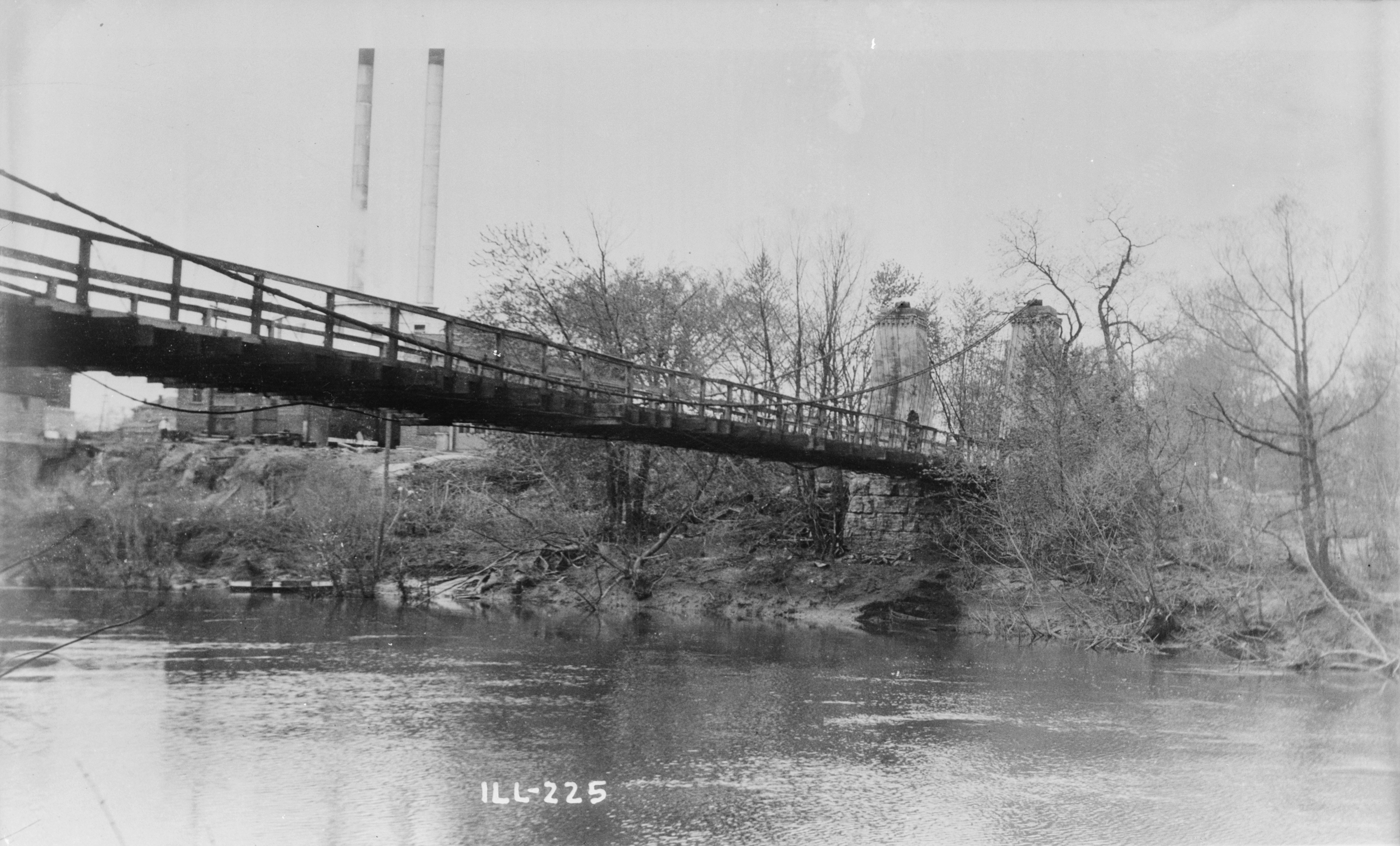
The General Dean Suspension Bridge in 1936 for the Historic American Buildings Survey

The General Dean Suspension Bridge spans the Kaskaskia River at Carlyle in Clinton County, Illinois, United States. It is named after Major General William F. Dean, a native of Carlyle who served during the Korean War. The bridge is listed on the National Register of Historic Places. It was added to the Register in 1973.

== History ==
The bridge was originally constructed in 1859 at a cost of $40,000. The original bridge remained in operation for nearly seventy years. Before the bridge was constructed, travelers were forced to cross the Kaskaskia at Carlyle by ferry or over a mud bridge. In 1950 the Historic American Buildings Survey (HABS) recognized the bridge for its architectural significance. HABS recommended preservation of the bridge. The Illinois General Assembly set aside $20,000 for bridge restoration in 1951, and in 1953 the bridge was named after Major General Dean.
