= Carlyle, Illinois =

- City
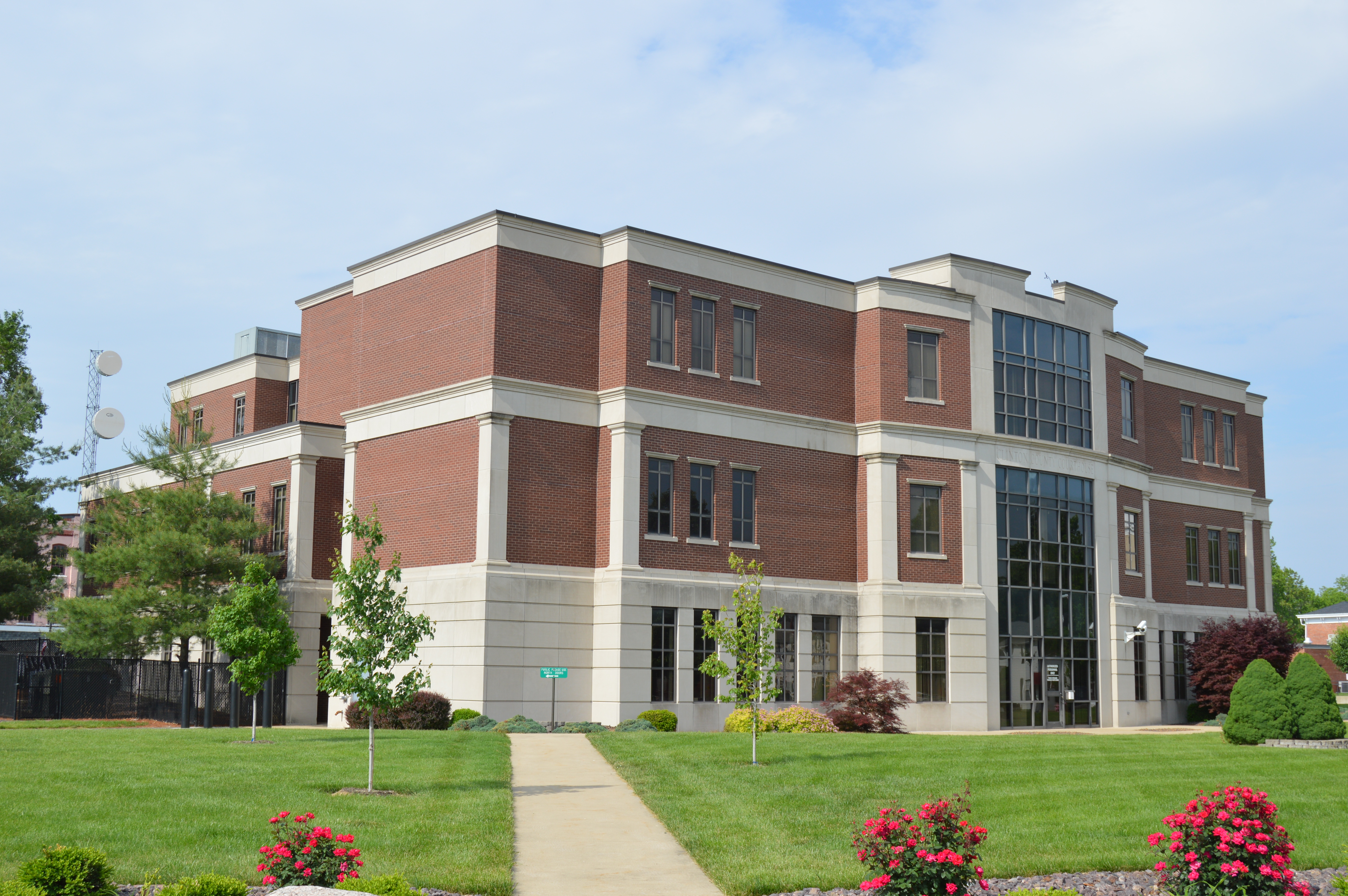
- Clinton County Courthouse, Carlyle
- Interactive map of Carlyle, Illinois
- Location within Illinois Location within the United States
- Coordinates: 38°37′18″N 89°22′25″W
- Country: United States
- State: Illinois
- County: Clinton
- Settled: 1811
- Incorporated (town): February 10, 1837
- Incorporated (city): April 17, 1884

Area
  - Total: 3.42 sq mi (8.87 km^{2})
  - Land: 3.42 sq mi (8.87 km^{2})
  - Water: 0 sq mi (0.00 km^{2})
- Elevation: 469 ft (143 m)

Population (2020)
  - Total: 3,253
  - Density: 949.9/sq mi (366.76/km^{2})
- Time zone: UTC-6 (CST)
  - Summer (DST): UTC-5 (CDT)
- ZIP code: 62231
- Area code: 618
- FIPS code: 17-11228
- GNIS feature ID: 2393749

Carlyle is a city in and the county seat of Clinton County, Illinois, United States. The population was 3,253 at the 2020 census.

Carlyle is located approximately 50 miles (80 km) east of St. Louis, Missouri, and is home to Illinois' largest man-made lake, Carlyle Lake, and to the General Dean Suspension Bridge, a suspension bridge that is the only one of its kind in Illinois and crosses the Kaskaskia River.

== History ==
In 1811 or 1812, a man named John Hill built one of several "block" houses along the Goshen Trail, located at what is currently 201 Fairfax Street. The houses were reportedly built to serve as a line of defense against Native Americans. John Hill built the first house to be located in what has become Carlyle. He also established what could be considered Carlyle's first business: a ferry to carry traffic across the Kaskaskia River, including a small shelter at the river which served as a toll house.

In 1816, Charles Slade and two of his brothers reached the John Hill settlement and bought him out. Charles farmed the land, took over the ferry, and within a year partnered with a man named Hubbard to start the first store, a mercantile business located at what is now 301 Fairfax Street. In 1818, a man named Calvin Barnes laid out town lots. On March 10, 1819, a post office was first established under the name Carlisle, Illinois. This spelling might have been a clerical error.

The area was settled after the 1809 creation of the Illinois Territory but before Illinois achieved statehood, six to seven years after John Hill had already built his establishment. Illinois' first state capitol was located in Kaskaskia, but in 1820 the state decided that it should be moved. Carlyle lost to Vandalia by one vote. In 1824, the State of Illinois created Clinton County by carving it out of Washington, Bond, and Fayette counties. Carlyle was to be the county seat should land be donated for this purpose. Charles Slade donated 20 acres (8.1 ha) of property so that the county seat would be located in Carlyle.

Carlyle was founded in 1818 by Charles W. Slade, father of Joseph "Jack" Slade, who named the town after his grandmother's family. It was incorporated as a town on 2/10/1837 and incorporated as a city on 4/17/1884. Carlyle celebrated 150 years and used the 1837 date.

Charles Slade pushed hard for Carlyle to become the state capital of Illinois, but lost by one vote to Vandalia in 1819. In 1824, Clinton County was formed, and Carlyle became the county seat in July 1825, both at the initiative of Charles Slade.

== Geography ==
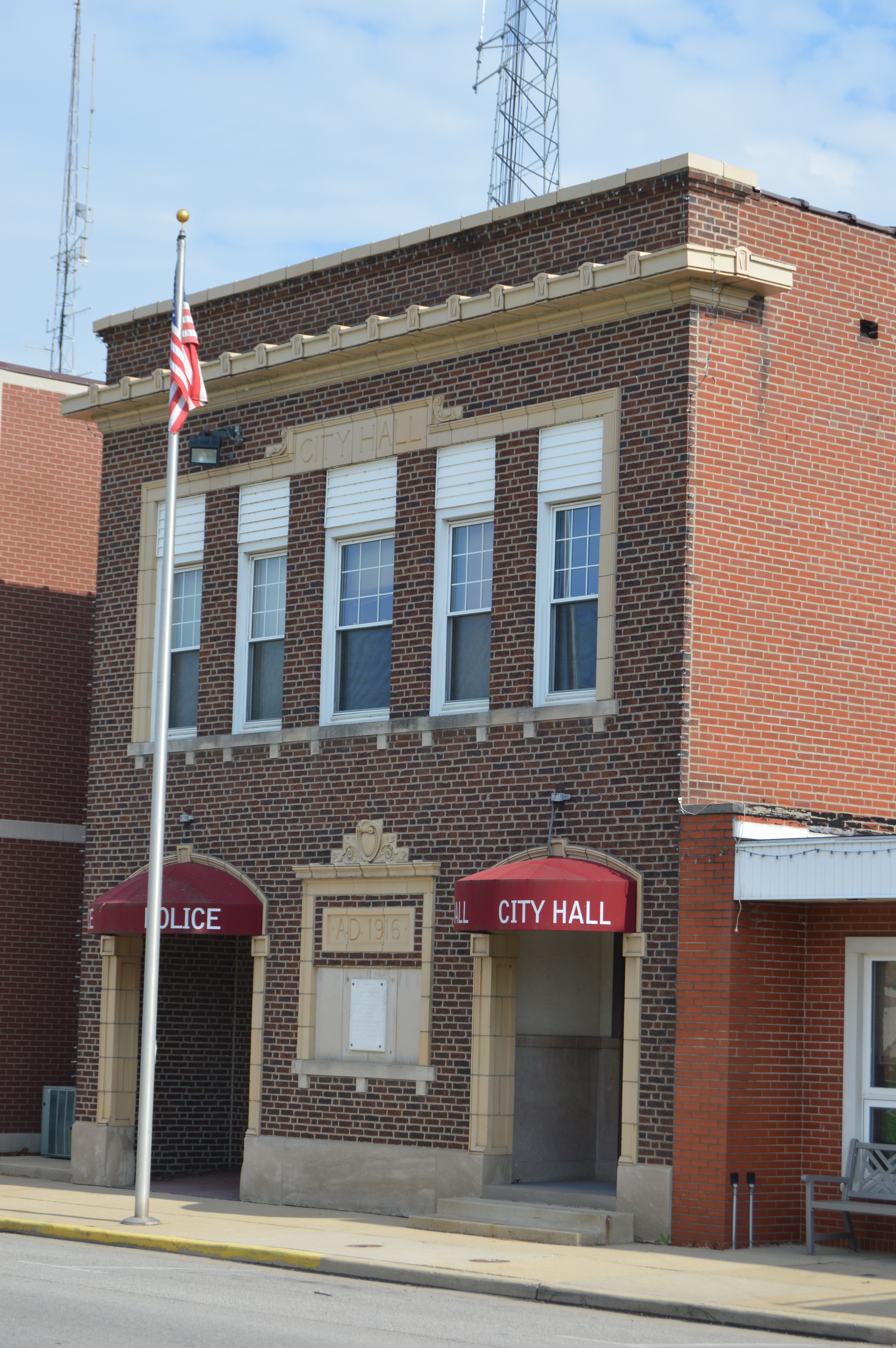
Carlyle City Hall

Carlyle is located slightly east of the center of Clinton County. The Kaskaskia River flows through the easternmost part of the city out of Carlyle Dam, located just northeast of the city limits and which impounds Carlyle Lake, the largest lake wholly in Illinois.

U.S. Route 50 passes through the city, leading east 23 miles (37 km) to Salem and west 50 miles (80 km) to St. Louis. Illinois Route 127 leads north 21 miles (34 km) to Greenville and south 19 miles (31 km) to Nashville, Illinois. The General Dean Suspension Bridge, built in 1859 and named after Major General William F. Dean in 1953, crosses the Kaskaskia River just north of the current US 50 bridge.

According to the 2021 census gazetteer files, Carlyle has a total area of 3.43 square miles (8.88 km^{2}), of which 3.43 square miles (8.88 km^{2}) (or 99.97%) is land and 0.00 square miles (0.00 km^{2}) (or 0.03%) is water.

=== Climate ===
Climate data for Carlyle, Illinois (1991–2020 normals, extremes 1939–present)
Month	Jan	Feb	Mar	Apr	May	Jun	Jul	Aug	Sep	Oct	Nov	Dec	Year
Record high °F (°C)	73 (23)	77 (25)	89 (32)	90 (32)	97 (36)	107 (42)	113 (45)	106 (41)	105 (41)	95 (35)	85 (29)	74 (23)	113 (45)
Mean maximum °F (°C)	62.0 (16.7)	66.6 (19.2)	75.3 (24.1)	81.6 (27.6)	87.7 (30.9)	93.5 (34.2)	95.4 (35.2)	95.3 (35.2)	91.5 (33.1)	84.9 (29.4)	72.7 (22.6)	62.3 (16.8)	97.3 (36.3)
Mean daily maximum °F (°C)	39.1 (3.9)	44.8 (7.1)	54.8 (12.7)	66.6 (19.2)	75.9 (24.4)	84.8 (29.3)	88.3 (31.3)	87.4 (30.8)	81.0 (27.2)	69.5 (20.8)	55.1 (12.8)	43.3 (6.3)	65.9 (18.8)
Daily mean °F (°C)	30.3 (−0.9)	34.8 (1.6)	44.6 (7.0)	55.7 (13.2)	65.9 (18.8)	74.9 (23.8)	78.2 (25.7)	76.8 (24.9)	69.5 (20.8)	57.9 (14.4)	45.3 (7.4)	34.8 (1.6)	55.7 (13.2)
Mean daily minimum °F (°C)	21.5 (−5.8)	24.9 (−3.9)	34.5 (1.4)	44.8 (7.1)	55.9 (13.3)	64.9 (18.3)	68.1 (20.1)	66.2 (19.0)	58.1 (14.5)	46.3 (7.9)	35.5 (1.9)	26.3 (−3.2)	45.6 (7.6)
Mean minimum °F (°C)	0.5 (−17.5)	7.2 (−13.8)	16.0 (−8.9)	30.3 (−0.9)	41.8 (5.4)	53.0 (11.7)	58.9 (14.9)	56.2 (13.4)	43.7 (6.5)	31.0 (−0.6)	20.1 (−6.6)	9.2 (−12.7)	−2.4 (−19.1)
Record low °F (°C)	−22 (−30)	−20 (−29)	−5 (−21)	22 (−6)	30 (−1)	41 (5)	47 (8)	43 (6)	30 (−1)	20 (−7)	0 (−18)	−19 (−28)	−22 (−30)
Average precipitation inches (mm)	3.05 (77)	2.45 (62)	3.67 (93)	4.90 (124)	5.23 (133)	4.87 (124)	4.24 (108)	3.59 (91)	3.65 (93)	3.39 (86)	3.72 (94)	3.10 (79)	45.86 (1,165)
Average precipitation days (≥ 0.01 in)	9.8	9.0	11.0	11.4	12.4	10.6	8.5	8.1	7.7	9.1	9.4	11.0	118.0
Source: NOAA

== Demographics ==
Historical population
Census	Pop.	Note	%±
1850	289		—
1870	1,364		—
1880	2,017		47.9%
1890	1,784		−11.6%
1900	1,874		5.0%
1910	1,982		5.8%
1920	2,027		2.3%
1930	2,078		2.5%
1940	2,591		24.7%
1950	2,669		3.0%
1960	2,903		8.8%
1970	3,139		8.1%
1980	3,388		7.9%
1990	3,474		2.5%
2000	3,406		−2.0%
2010	3,281		−3.7%
2020	3,253		−0.9%
U.S. Decennial Census

=== 2020 census ===
As of the 2020 census, Carlyle had a population of 3,253. There were 1,041 families residing in the city, and the population density was 949.50 inhabitants per square mile (366.60/km^{2}). There were 1,480 housing units at an average density of 431.99 per square mile (166.79/km^{2}).

The median age was 43.7 years. 20.1% of residents were under the age of 18 and 23.6% of residents were 65 years of age or older. For every 100 females there were 97.2 males, and for every 100 females age 18 and over there were 94.2 males age 18 and over.

0.0% of residents lived in urban areas, while 100.0% lived in rural areas.

There were 1,361 households in Carlyle, of which 24.3% had children under the age of 18 living in them. Of all households, 44.4% were married-couple households, 19.4% were households with a male householder and no spouse or partner present, and 28.4% were households with a female householder and no spouse or partner present. About 33.5% of all households were made up of individuals and 15.4% had someone living alone who was 65 years of age or older.

There were 1,480 housing units, of which 8.0% were vacant. The homeowner vacancy rate was 2.1% and the rental vacancy rate was 4.8%.

Racial composition as of the 2020 census
Race	Number	Percent
White	2,881	88.6%
Black or African American	127	3.9%
American Indian and Alaska Native	10	0.3%
Asian	29	0.9%
Native Hawaiian and Other Pacific Islander	0	0.0%
Some other race	28	0.9%
Two or more races	178	5.5%
Hispanic or Latino (of any race)	76	2.3%

=== Income and poverty ===
The median income for a household in the city was $54,750, and the median income for a family was $67,188. Males had a median income of $28,125 versus $29,296 for females. The per capita income for the city was $27,101. About 10.9% of families and 11.4% of the population were below the poverty line, including 10.1% of those under age 18 and 30.7% of those age 65 or over.

== Notable people ==
- Herman J. C. Beckemeyer, Illinois state legislator, lawyer, and mayor of Carlyle
- Sidney Breese, circuit court judge, US senator, Illinois Supreme Court justice
- William F. Dean, major general, Medal of Honor recipient
- Elias Smith Dennis, Union Army general in the Civil War
- James Donnewald, state treasurer
- Pat Jarvis, pitcher for the Atlanta Braves and Montreal Expos
- Patsy McGaffigan, infielder for the Philadelphia Phillies
- Edwin P. Ramsey, United States Army officer
- Mel Simons, outfielder for the Chicago White Sox
- Charles Slade, US marshal, congressman
- Jack Slade, American frontier figure, gunslinger
- William A. J. Sparks, US congressman
