= Joseph Alfred Slade =

American gunman (1831–1864)

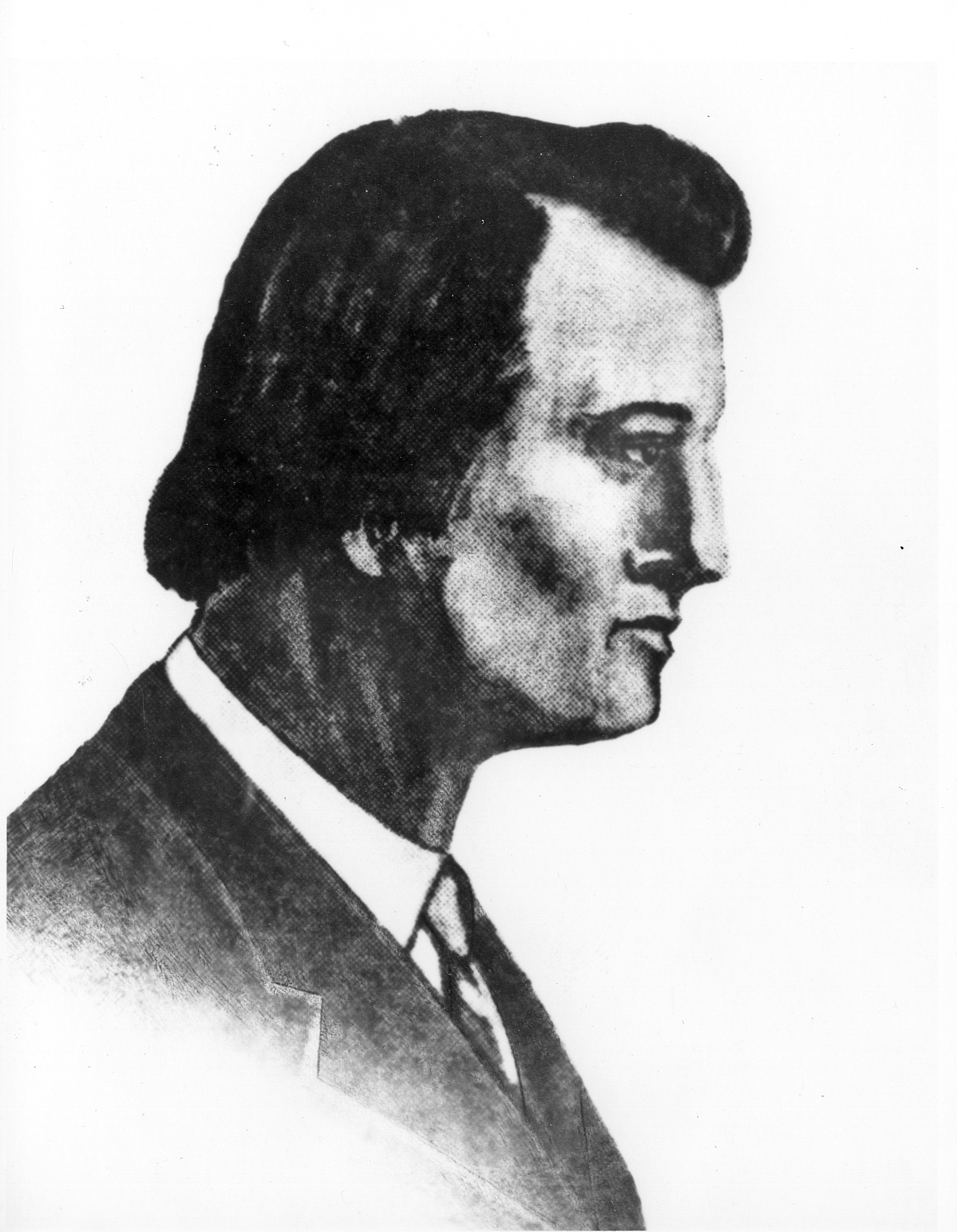
- Born: January 22, 1831; Carlyle, Illinois, U.S.
- Died: March 10, 1864 (aged 33); Virginia City, Montana, U.S.
- Spouse: Maria Virginia (m. 1857)
- Father: Charles Slade

Joseph Alfred "Jack" Slade, (January 22, 1831 – March 10, 1864) was a stagecoach and Pony Express superintendent, instrumental in the opening of the American West and the archetype of the Western gunslinger.

Born in Carlyle, Illinois, he was the son of Illinois politician Charles Slade and Mary Dark (Kain) Slade. During the Mexican–American War, he served in the U.S. Army that occupied Santa Fe, 1847–48. After his father's death, Slade's mother married Civil War General Elias Dennis.

He married Maria Virginia (maiden name unknown) around 1857. In the 1850s, he was a freighting teamster and wagonmaster along the Overland Trail, and then became a stagecoach driver in Texas, around 1857–58. He subsequently became a stagecoach division superintendent along the Central Overland route for Hockaday & Co. (1858–59) and its successors Jones, Russell & Co. (1859) and Central Overland, California & Pike's Peak Express Co. (1859–62). With the latter concern, he also helped launch and operate the Pony Express in 1860–61. All were critical to the communication between the East and California. As superintendent, he enforced order and assured reliable cross-continental mail service, maintaining contact between Washington, DC, and California on the eve of Civil War.

While division superintendent, he shot and killed Andrew Ferrin, one of his subordinates, who was hindering the progress of a freight train, in May 1859. At the time, shooting deaths of this kind in the West were rare and Jack Slade's reputation as a "gunfighter" spread rapidly across the country.

In March 1860, Slade was ambushed and left for dead by Jules Beni, the corrupt stationkeeper at Julesburg, Colorado, whom Slade had removed. Slade remarkably survived, and in August 1861, Beni was killed by Slade's men after ignoring Slade's warning to stay out of his territory.

Slade's ferocious reputation, though, combined with a drinking problem, caused his downfall. He was fired by the Central Overland for drunkenness in November 1862. During a drunken spree in Virginia City, Montana, he was lynched by local vigilantes on March 10, 1864, for disturbing the peace. He was buried in Salt Lake City, Utah, on July 20, 1864.

== Legacy ==
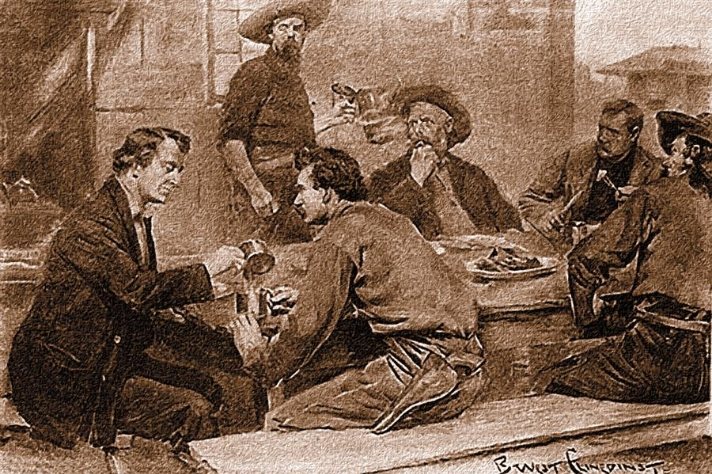
Illustration of Jack Slade meeting Mark Twain, on August 3, 1861, by Benjamin Clinedinst.

Slade's exploits spawned numerous legends, many of them untrue. His image, especially by Mark Twain in Roughing It, as the vicious killer of up to 26 victims was greatly exaggerated. Only one killing by Slade, that of Andrew Ferrin, is undisputed.

In his essay "Raffles and Miss Blandish," the English essayist George Orwell criticized Twain's admiration for Slade, saying that Twain's attitude represented an alleged American tolerance for violent crime.

Slade's life was depicted in the 1953 film movie Jack Slade, with Mark Stevens starring as Slade. Dorothy Malone co-starred as Virginia Maria Dale and Barton MacLane was Jules Beni. The tagline for the movie was "Everyone knew the terror of his blazing iron...only she knew the fire in his heart!"

Gregg Palmer played Slade in a 1955 episode of the syndicated television series Stories of the Century, starring and narrated by Jim Davis. Paul Newlan portrayed Jules Beni and Elaine Riley played Virginia Slade in this episode.

John Dehner played an evil version of Slade, who is shot and finally shows some decency before dying, in the Laramie episode "Company Man", aired in February, 1960. The same episode featured Dabbs Greer as Samuel Clemens (Mark Twain), who, when asked about his profession, says that he is a writer, working on a new book, which he is going to title Roughing It.

In 1963, Don Collier played Jack Slade in the season-12 episode of the television series Death Valley Days titled "The Man Who Died Twice."

John Dennis Johnston played Slade in the 1999 made-for-cable fantasy Western movie Purgatory.

Ned Beatty played Slade in the 2002 Hallmark Channel miniseries Roughing It.

== See also ==
- Virginia Dale, Colorado
- Julesburg, Colorado, named after Jules Beni, whom Slade's men killed in 1861 after Beni ambushed and shot Slade multiple times in 1860.
