= Jules Beni =

American outlaw (d. 1861)

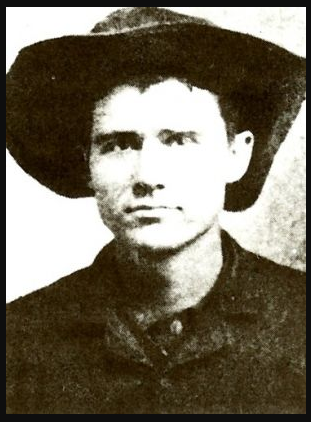
- Jules Beni around the 1840s/1850s
- Died: August of 1861; Julesburg, Colorado
- Cause of death: shot by Joseph Alfred Slade
- Other names: Jules Reni

Jules Beni (born between 1798 and 1807) (died 1861) was a western outlaw who robbed stagecoaches in the Colorado Territory.

Beni was involved in illegal activities linked to his trading post near Lodgepole Creek, Colorado, which was called by one Eastern journalist the "wickedest city on the plains." By the end of the decade the city had grown rapidly with the addition of a stagecoach station, which was eventually named Julesburg by the townspeople in honor of Beni.

However, upon Beni's appointment as manager of the station, the stagecoach lines were robbed constantly. As the gang usually targeted specific stages carrying money and other valuable cargo, Beni soon was suspected of involvement and eventually replaced by gunman Jack Slade.

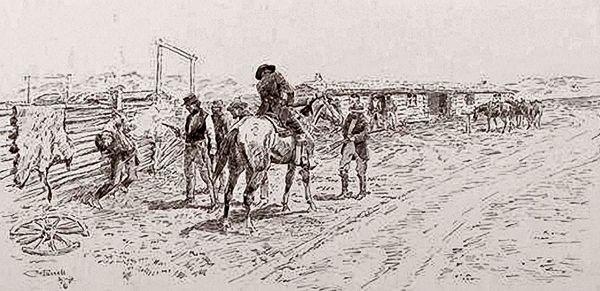
The murder of Jules Beni by Charles Russell.

Beni's involvement, which by then was obvious, led to arguments between Beni and Slade, eventually leading to a gunfight between the two, as Beni ambushed Slade, severely wounding him with a shotgun blast. Slade recovered from his wounds, however, and Beni, who was arrested and awaiting trial, was released after promising to leave the city. Beni returned a year later where he was killed by Slade, who by his account claimed Beni had made another attempt on his life, and left him tied to a fence post, shot several times and his ears cut off.

Slade was said to have kept the ears as souvenirs, using one of the ears as a watch fob and selling the other for drinking money.

Paul Newlan played Beni, and Gregg Palmer portrayed Slade in a 1955 episode of the syndicated television series Stories of the Century, starring and narrated by Jim Davis. Elaine Riley appeared as Slade's wife, Maria Virginia.

== Sources ==
- Sifakis, Carl. Encyclopedia of American Crime, New York, Facts on File Inc., 1982
