= Alvin M. and Betty Josephy Library of Western History and Culture =

Coordinates: 45.355518°N 117.230448°W

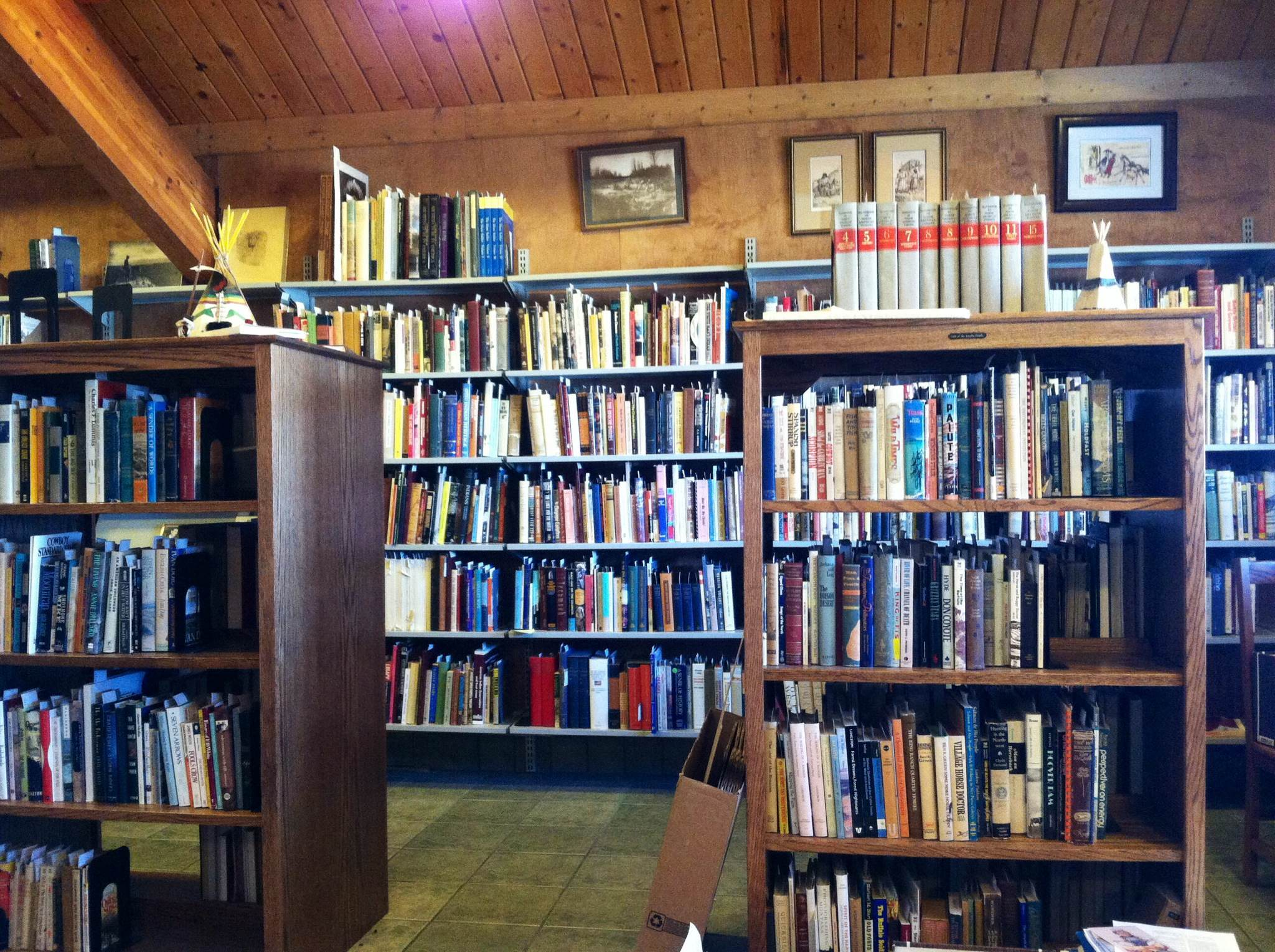
Main stacks - The Alvin M. and Betty Josephy Library of Western History and Culture

The Alvin M. and Betty Josephy Library of Western History and Culture is a private, non-circulating SAGE-affiliated library located in Joseph, Oregon, United States. It is located on the second floor of the Josephy Center for Arts and Culture. It is based on the collection and writings of historian and Native American advocate Alvin M. Josephy, Jr. and his wife Betty. In the library's own words, it "honors Alvin's work as a historian of and advocate for American Indians, and Alvin and Betty's commitment to literature, history, the arts, the West, and to the people of all colors and backgrounds who have lived in and loved the West."

== History ==
On Alvin Josephy's death in 2005 his personal collection at Greenwich, Connecticut, and Joseph, Oregon, was divided between the Knight Library at the University of Oregon, the Smithsonian National Museum of the American Indian, and Fishtrap: Rich Wandschneider, then director of Fishtrap, went to Connecticut to retrieve materials. When the Josephy Center was founded in the fall of 2012 the collection moved from the Fishtrap basement to its current home on the second floor of the center. The library continues to expand, with a focus on acquiring the comprehensive works of Alvin Josephy, along with an array of supplemental materials on the Nez Perce and other Native Americans of the Columbia Plateau, that will help work "towards a broad understanding of the West".

== Collection ==
The Josephy Library is based on over 2000 books, journals, and manuscripts from Josephy's home libraries. The main collection is not circulating, though it is open to the public. The library also recently started a lending shelf to loan materials that it has in duplicate.

The library is cataloged through the Sage Library System of Eastern Oregon libraries administered by Eastern Oregon University in La Grande.

== Events ==
The library hosts bi-weekly "Brown Bag" lunch talks on a variety of topics, from the Civil War in the West to flint knapping and Native American tools. These events are free and open to the public and held every first and fourth Tuesday of the month.

Furthermore, Library Director Rich Wandschneider runs a library blog, which includes book reviews, notes on library acquisitions, and Wandschneider's own observations and musings.
