= Julesburg station =

- Union Pacific Railroad Julesburg Depot
- U.S. National Register of Historic Places
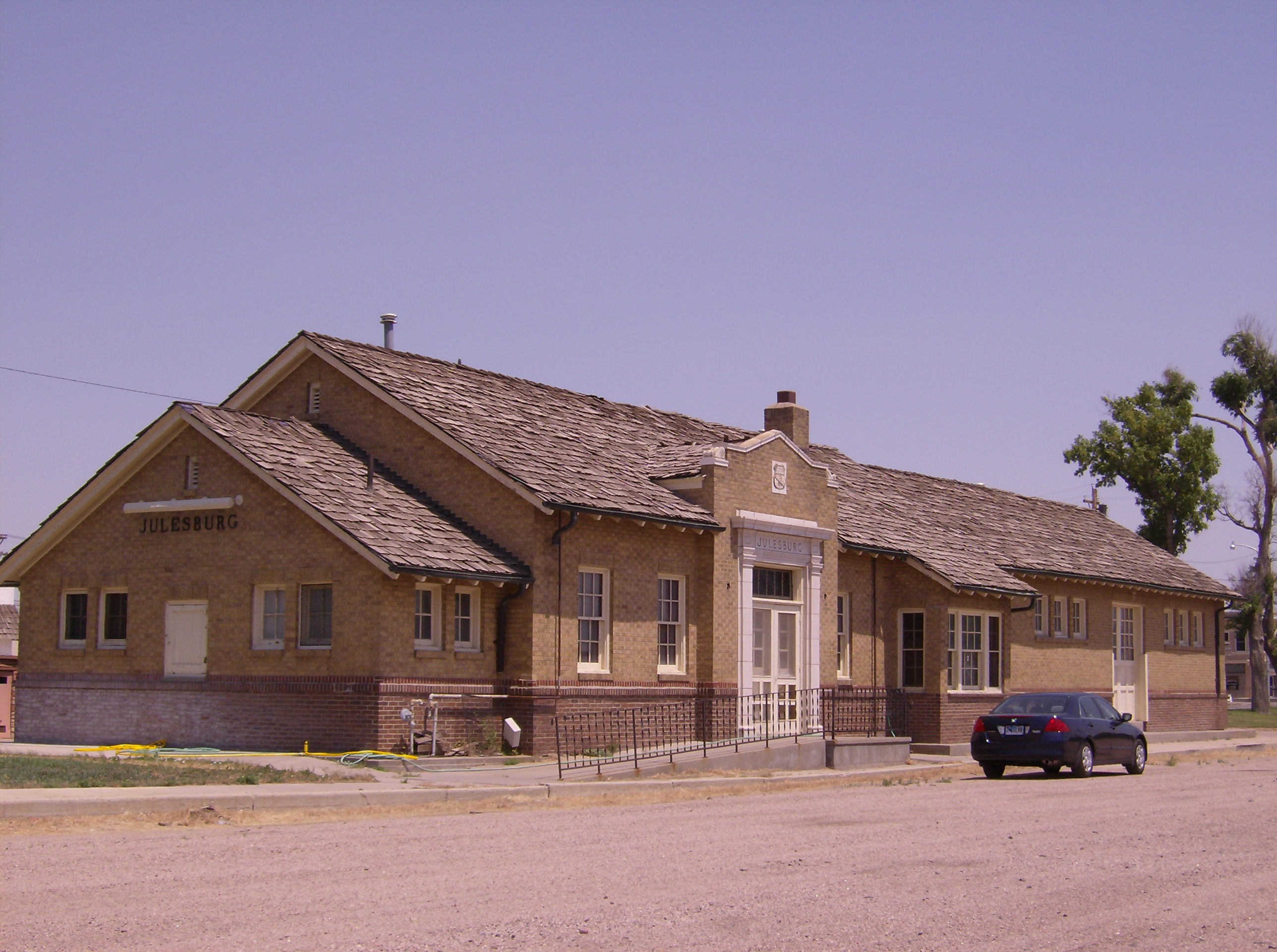

- Location within Colorado Location within the United States
- Location: 210 W. First St., Julesburg, Colorado
- Coordinates: 40°59′8″N 102°15′48″W
- Area: less than one acre
- Built: 1930
- Built by: Union Pacific Railroad
- Architectural style: Late 19th and Early 20th Century American Movements
- NRHP reference No.: 04000019
- Added to NRHP: February 11, 2004

The Union Pacific Railroad Julesburg Depot, at 210 W. First St. in Julesburg, Colorado, and also known as the Depot Museum, was built in 1930. It is listed on the National Register of Historic Places.

It is a brick, one-story building built as a standard Union Pacific Railroad "combination-type" depot, i.e. handling passengers as well as freight and express shipments.

The depot was hit by a tornado on June 6, 1947, that badly damaged the building; it was repaired. In 1974 it was moved a short distance and turned into a museum.

It was listed on the National Register in 2004. It was deemed significant for its role in transportation and the economic growth of Julesburg, and architecturally for its design, materials, and workmanship which are preserved despite the building having been moved a short distance.

Preceding station	Union Pacific Railroad	Following station
Chappell toward Ogden	Overland Route	Big Springs toward Council Bluffs Transfer
Ovid toward Denver	Julesburg Cutoff	through to Omaha via Overland Route
