= Sedgwick County Courthouse =

- U.S. National Register of Historic Places
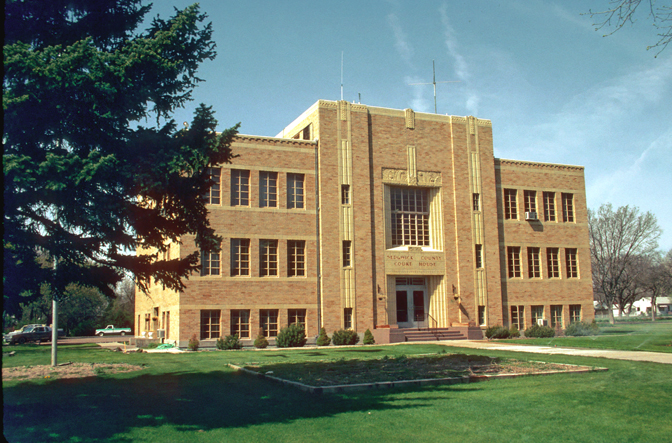
- Photo by Calvin Beale

- Location within Colorado Location within the United States
- Location: 315 Cedar St., Julesburg, Colorado
- Coordinates: 40°59′18″N 102°15′52″W
- Area: 2.5 acres (1.0 ha)
- Built: 1938-39
- Architect: Jamieson, W. Gordon; Stiffler, R. Ewing
- Architectural style: Late 19th and 20th Century Revivals, WPA Art Deco
- MPS: New Deal Resources on Colorado's Eastern Plains MPS
- NRHP reference No.: 07000345
- Added to NRHP: April 24, 2007

The Sedgwick County Courthouse, located at 315 Cedar St. in Julesburg, Colorado, was built during 1938-39 by the Works Progress Administration (WPA). It was listed on the National Register of Historic Places in 2007; the listing included two contributing buildings.

It was deemed significant in social history for representing federal relief programs; its construction provided "much needed assistance by giving jobs to the unemployed of the county during the Great Depression."

It also was deemed significant architecturally, as "an excellent example of the Art Deco style as applied to a government building whose construction was constrained by the economic conditions of the Depression." It was designed by Jamieson and Stiffler, architects of Denver.
