= Emilia Justyna Powell =

American political scientist

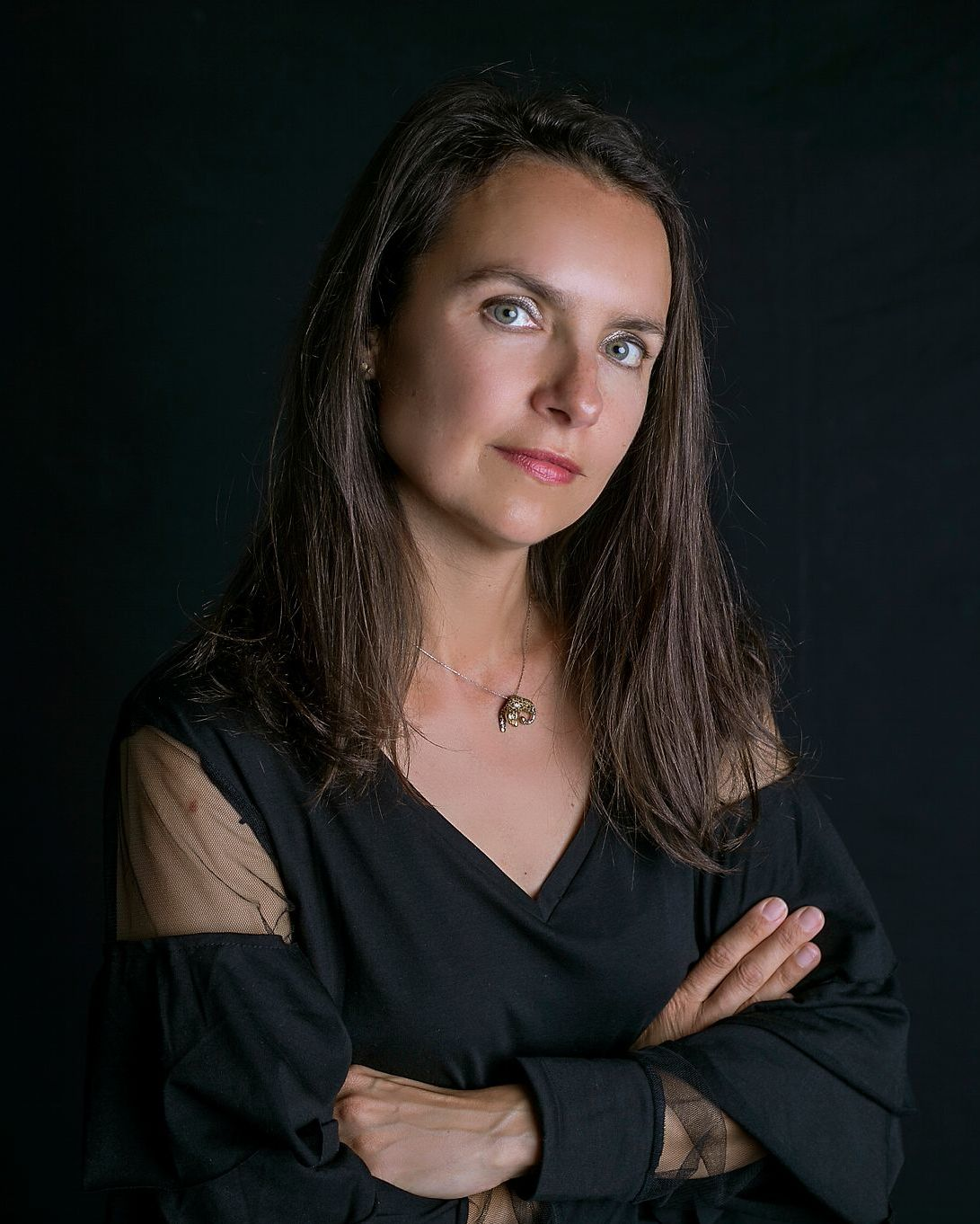
- Born: Toruń, Poland

Academic background
- Education: University of Cambridge; Nicolaus Copernicus University; PhD. Florida State University
- Thesis: Conflict, cooperation, and the world's legal systems (2007)
- Doctoral advisor: Dale L. Smith

Academic work
- Institutions: University of Alabama; University of Notre Dame

Emilia Justyna Powell is a Polish-American political scientist. She is a Professor and Chair of the Department of Political Science, and Concurrent Professor of Law at the University of Notre Dame and is known for her expertise on international dispute resolution, the Islamic legal tradition, Islamic international law, and Islamic constitutionalism.

== Early life and education ==
Justyna Powell received her PhD from Florida State University in 2007.

== Career ==
In 2011, Powell joined the University of Notre Dame as an assistant professor of political science. She has been a fellow at the Oxford Centre for Islamic Studies, and at the Centre of Excellence for International Courts. Powell has published several papers in top academic journals including International Organization, Journal of Politics, International Studies Quarterly, Journal of Peace Research, Journal of Conflict Resolution, Law and Contemporary Problems, and Yearbook of Arab Association of Constitutional Law.

== Books ==
- Domestic Law Goes Global: Legal Traditions and International Courts (with Sara McLaughlin Mitchell), Cambridge University Press 2011
- Islamic Law and International Law: Peaceful Settlement of Disputes, Oxford University Press 2020
