= Clinton County Courthouse (Illinois) =

Local government building in the United States

Coordinates: 38°36′39″N 89°22′6″W

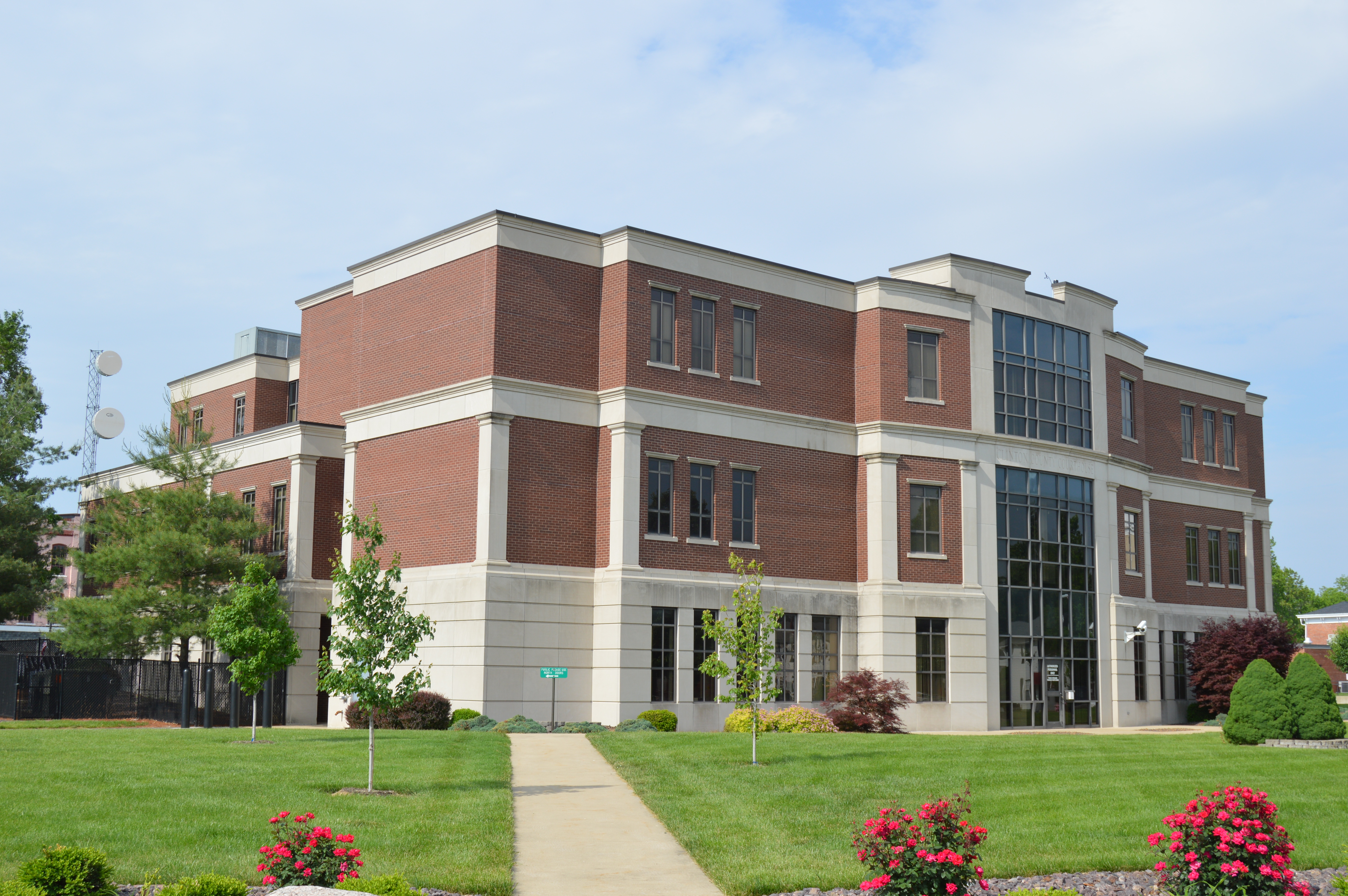
Front and western side, seen from Franklin Street (U.S. Route 50)

The Clinton County Courthouse is a government building in Carlyle, the county seat of Clinton County, Illinois, United States. Built in 1999, this new structure is the county's third courthouse; it replaced a building that had been in use since the 1840s.

== County seat history ==
The major territorial road from Shawneetown to Kaskaskia was constructed in 1808, and settlers soon began to take advantage of improved transportation by claiming lands near the road. Squatters began arriving in 1809, but the advance of civilization was retarded by the depredations of Indian bands, and only after the end of the War of 1812 could settlement occur on a more widespread basis. Carlyle's foundation predated the war, consisting of a blockhouse fort to protect local settlers. Clinton County has never experienced a county seat war, as Carlyle has been the seat ever since the county's establishment in 1824.

== Architecture ==
Clinton County's obscure first courthouse was used until the construction of a replacement in 1849. This was a two-story brick structure in the shape of the letter "I", with a three-bay central projection that included the main entrance and side rooms. Built of brick with corner pilasters, it was covered with a mansard roof supported by brackets under the eaves. Its arches were placed over each of the windows, most of which were single, although the doorways sat under larger double windows, and a triangular dormer window was placed in a small tower over the entrance. This building remained in use until 1997, after which Clinton County functioned without a courthouse for two years. Its replacement, the current structure, was completed in 1999 under the direction of Phillips Swager Associates and Kuhlmann Design Group; a modernist building, it features a concrete first story and two upper stories of brick with concrete belt courses and pilasters on the corners. A central glass section rises from ground to roof, broken only by the belt course between the second and third stories; aside from this, the windows are plain and rectangular.
