= The Captive City (1952 film) =

1952 film by Robert Wise

- Theatrical release poster
- Directed by: Robert Wise
- Screenplay by: Karl Kamb; Alvin M. Josephy
- Story by: Alvin M. Josephy
- Produced by: Theron Warth
- Starring: John Forsythe
- Cinematography: Lee Garmes
- Edited by: Robert Swink
- Music by: Jerome Moross
- Production companies: Aspen Productions; Avernus Productions
- Distributed by: United Artists
- Release date: March 26, 1952 (New York)
- Running time: 91 minutes
- Country: United States
- Language: English

The Captive City is a 1952 American crime film noir directed by Robert Wise and starring John Forsythe. The screenplay is based on thee experiences of Time magazine reporter Alvin M. Josephy Jr., who cowrote the script.

== Plot ==
Newspaper editor and co-owner Jim Austin and his wife are fleeing Kennington, where they live and work, so that he may testify before a U.S. Senate special committee investigating crime in interstate commerce. They are pursued by the criminal element from their town and take refuge at a police station in the town of Warren. Austin requests an escort and uses the station's tape recorder to chronicle the events that have brought him to this point.

Austin began investigating bookmaking in Kennington after the suspicious death of private detective Clyde Nelson, who discovered police complicity with illegal gambling while working a divorce case for Mrs. Sirak, whose ex-husband Murray was a bookmaker. Austin questioned the police response to Nelson's death and then began his own investigation after being goaded by the chief of police. After Austin discovered that Mafia-affiliated gangster Dominick Fabretti had moved into town, Sirak attempted to squelch Austin's activity with a bribe, and Austin and his wife were continually harassed.

The city fathers, the police and the respectable elements of the community all consented to the gambling activity, arguing that betting is inevitable and that exposing it would injure the city's reputation. Mrs. Sirak was murdered after she had agreed to disclose that Fabretti was responsible for Nelson's murder. Austin's partner at the newspaper dropped his support for Austin because the paper had been losing advertisers as a result of his crusade.

To stop Fabretti and his activities, Austin's final recourse was an appeal to involve the local ministers, but when even they declined to become involved, Austin appealed to the senatorial crime commission. A grave threat from Sirak spurred Austin and his wife to flee in the middle of the night, followed by Fabretti's henchmen.

Austin and his wife are escorted by the police and safely arrive at the commission hearing.

== Cast ==
- John Forsythe as Jim Austin
- Joan Camden as Marge Austin
- Harold J. Kennedy as Don Carey
- Marjorie Crossland as Mrs. Sirak
- Victor Sutherland as Murray Sirak
- Ray Teal as Chief Gillette
- Martin Milner as Phil Harding
- Geraldine Hall as Mrs. Nelson
- Hal K. Dawson as Clyde Nelson
- Ian Wolfe as Rev. Nash
- Gladys Hurlbut as Linda Purcy
- Jess Kirkpatrick as Anderson
- Paul Newlan as Krug
- Frances Morris as Mrs. Harding
- Paul Brinegar as Police Sergeant
- Paul Goldwater as Sally Carey
- Robert Gorell as Joe Berg
- Glenn Judd as Coverly
- William C. Miller as Coroner

== Background ==
The film's screenplay was inspired by the Kefauver Committee hearings of 1950-1951. The television broadcast of the hearings attracted great public interest and educated a broad audience about the issues of municipal corruption and organized crime. The success of the broadcast spurred the production of a cycle of exposé crime films dealing with the dismantling of complex criminal organizations by law-enforcement agencies.

Robert Wise screened the film for Senator Estes Kefauver, who endorsed the film. Kefauver provides a written statement in the prologue and appears in the epilogue, cautioning audiences about the evils of organized crime.

== Reception ==
In a contemporary review for The New York Times, critic Bosley Crowther called The Captive City "a crisp little film" and wrote: "[S]omewhere along about the middle of all these goings-on. an alert and knowing observer may spot some provoking holes. He may wonder, for instance, why the editor needs more pertinent and shocking evidence to lay before the public than a sequence of local crimes— the death of the private investigator, an attack upon a newspaper man who had photographed the 'big shot' in the city and the murder of a woman witness who was about to 'talk.' In their screen play, Karl Kamb and Alvin Josephy Jr. have almost completely overlooked the factor of public opinion and have let their editor behave as though he could not tell his story, though publishing a paper every day. For the sake of suspense in their picture, they have strangely isolated their man. The flaw in their screenplay writing is that they have fouled their hero in his newspaper work. Running to Senator Kefauver seems a weak and foolish thing for him to do."
