= Resident Evil (disambiguation) =

Resident Evil is a Japanese video game and other media franchise.

Resident Evil may also refer to:

- List of Resident Evil media including:
  - Resident Evil (1996 video game), the PlayStation video game, later re-released on several other platforms
  - Resident Evil (2002 video game), the GameCube remake, later re-released on several other platforms
  - Resident Evil (film series)
    - Resident Evil (2002 film), the first film of the series
    - Resident Evil (2026 film), a 2026 reboot of the series
  - Resident Evil (TV series)
- "Resident Evil" (The Vampire Diaries), an episode of the TV series The Vampire Diaries
