= Julesburg, Colorado =

Town in Colorado, United States

- Town
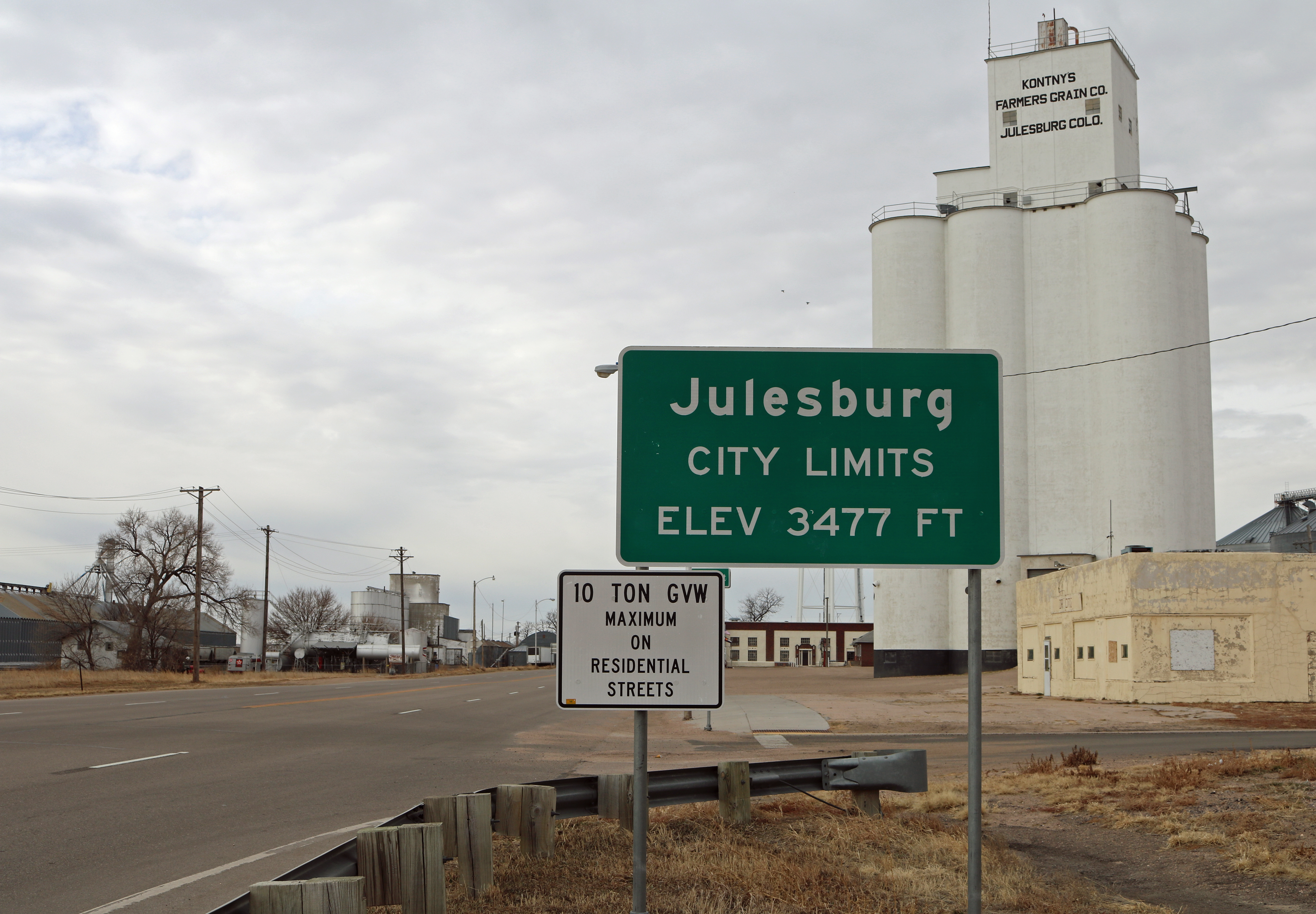
- Entering Julesburg from northeast (2017)
- Motto: "Gateway to Colorado"
- Location within Sedgwick County and Colorado
- Coordinates: 40°58′38″N 102°15′25″W
- Country: United States
- State: Colorado
- County: Sedgwick County Seat
- Incorporated: November 18, 1886
- Named for: Jules Beni

Area
  - Total: 1.51 sq mi (3.92 km^{2})
  - Land: 1.51 sq mi (3.92 km^{2})
  - Water: 0 sq mi (0.00 km^{2})
- Elevation: 3,468 ft (1,057 m)

Population (2020)
  - Total: 1,307
  - Density: 864/sq mi (333/km^{2})
- Time zone: UTC−7 (MST)
  - Summer (DST): UTC−6 (MDT)
- ZIP Code: 80737
- Area code: 970
- FIPS code: 08-39965
- GNIS ID: 2412812
- Website: townofjulesburg.com

Julesburg is the statutory town that is the county seat of and the most populous municipality in Sedgwick County, Colorado, United States. The population was 1,307 at the 2020 United States census.

== History ==
The original trading post was named for Jules Beni. Julesburg was on the Pony Express (1860–1861) route from Missouri to California.

=== Jack Slade ===
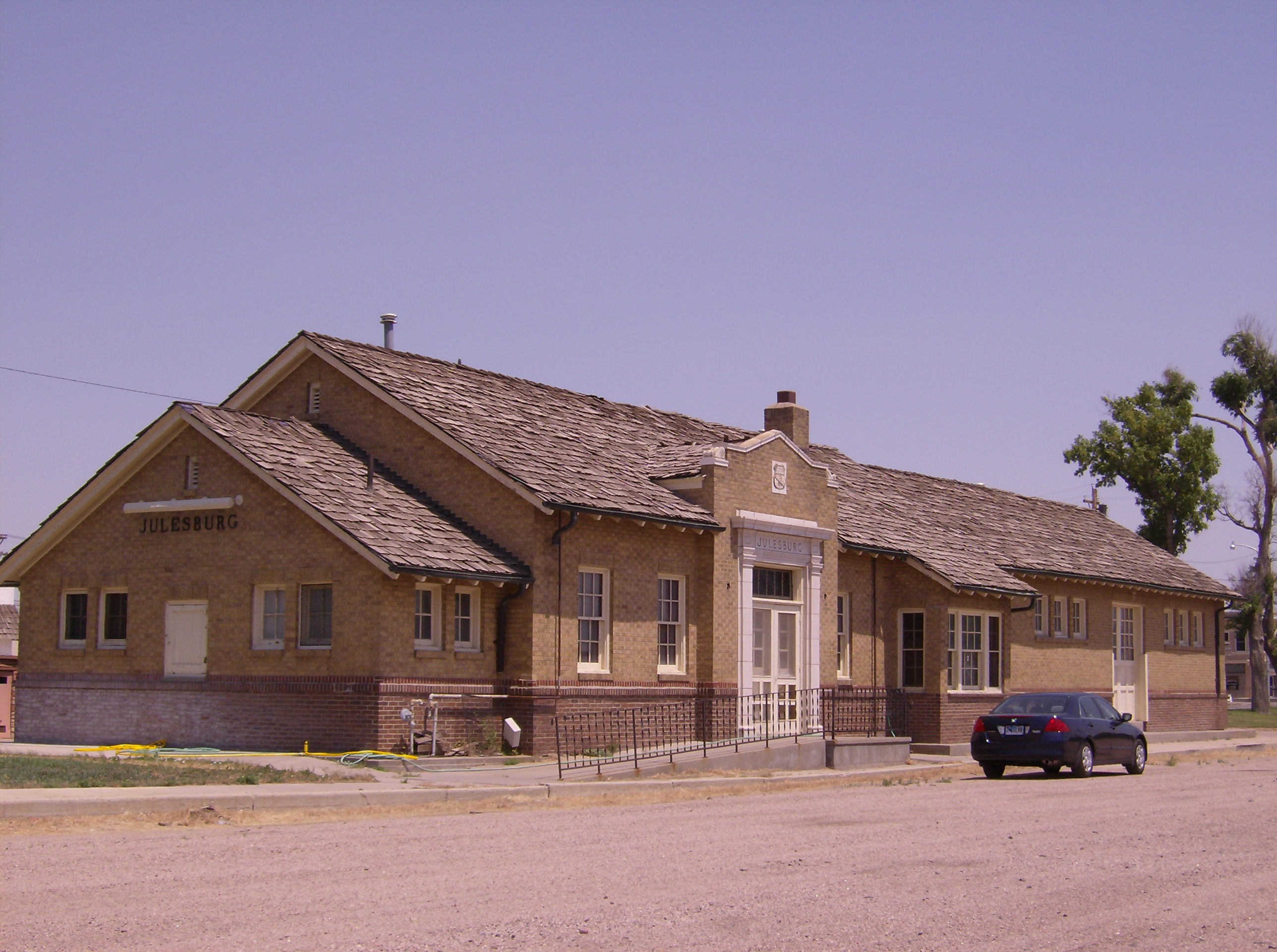
Julesburg's former Union Pacific station is now a museum

In 1858, Joseph A. "Jack" Slade, a superintendent for the Central Overland California and Pikes Peak Express Company, was tracking down horse thieves, including Jules Beni. Slade caught up with him at Julesburg, but Beni shot him five times. Thinking that Slade was dead, several angry townsfolk chased Beni out of Julesburg. When they returned, they found Slade struggling to his feet, having miraculously survived.

Beni continued to steal horses from the Pike's Peak Express Company, and Slade vowed to hunt him down. Beni attempted to ambush Slade at Slade's own ranch at Cold Springs. But Slade found out about the planned ambush and, along with some of his cowboys, captured Beni. Slade did not take Beni to authorities but instead shot him dead while he was tied to a fence post. He shot off each of Beni's fingers, then put the gun in Beni's mouth and pulled the trigger. Afterward, he severed Beni's ears as trophies.

=== Battle of Julesburg ===
Julesburg was a large and prominent stagecoach station and the site of Fort Rankin (later Fort Sedgwick). In revenge for the Sand Creek Massacre, one thousand Cheyenne, Arapaho, and Lakota warriors attacked Julesburg on January 7, 1865. In the battle the Indians defeated about 60 soldiers of the U.S. Army and 50 armed civilians. In the following weeks the Indians raided up and down the South Platte River valley. On February 2 they returned to Julesburg and burned down all the buildings in the settlement, although not attacking the soldiers and civilians holed up in the fort. At the time, the town was said to have had over 1000 buildings.

=== Union Pacific ===
In 1867, during the building of the Union Pacific transcontinental railroad, Julesburg served as an "end-of-track" town, where railroad workers would live while not laboring. At that time, about 4,000 workers inhabited the town, which had grown numerous saloons and gambling tents to serve them.

Such towns were generally very violent places. A colonel in the U.S Army stationed in Julesburg, Richard Irving Dodge, reported that of 127 graves he saw there, only six of those buried had died of natural causes. This worked out to one violent death for every day of the town's lifespan to that point. Many had been killed by vigilance committees, lynched and hung from the telegraph poles of the Union Pacific.

As the railroad advanced into Wyoming, new towns such as Cheyenne sprung up to house and service its workers. According to historian David T. Courtwright, end-of-track towns like Julesburg, Cheyenne and others were "agglomeration[s] (the word "community" is not appropriate) of young, transient, expendable, bachelor laborers whose self-image was one of toughness and whose unregulated vices attracted criminals, gamblers, prostitutes, and other armed opportunists eager to siphon off their wages." This mix created the environment that allowed the deadly violence of such places to thrive.

== Geography ==
According to the United States Census Bureau, the town has a total area of 1.3 square miles (3.4 km^{2}), all of it land.

The town is located on the north side of the South Platte River, along U.S. 138 and U.S. 385 and just off of I-76. It is the northernmost town in the state, less than 0.9 mi (1.4 km) south of the Colorado−Nebraska state line.

=== Climate ===
Julesburg has a semi-arid climate (Köppen BSk) with cold, dry winters and hot, wetter summers.

Climate data for Julesburg, Colorado, 1991–2020 normals, extremes 1893–present
Month	Jan	Feb	Mar	Apr	May	Jun	Jul	Aug	Sep	Oct	Nov	Dec	Year
Record high °F (°C)	74 (23)	79 (26)	88 (31)	94 (34)	100 (38)	107 (42)	109 (43)	109 (43)	106 (41)	95 (35)	85 (29)	77 (25)	109 (43)
Mean maximum °F (°C)	63.4 (17.4)	67.7 (19.8)	77.9 (25.5)	83.6 (28.7)	91.9 (33.3)	97.6 (36.4)	100.8 (38.2)	96.7 (35.9)	95.4 (35.2)	86.6 (30.3)	74.8 (23.8)	61.6 (16.4)	101.4 (38.6)
Mean daily maximum °F (°C)	40.5 (4.7)	44.0 (6.7)	54.5 (12.5)	61.9 (16.6)	70.7 (21.5)	81.5 (27.5)	87.6 (30.9)	85.3 (29.6)	78.3 (25.7)	64.5 (18.1)	51.2 (10.7)	40.5 (4.7)	63.4 (17.4)
Daily mean °F (°C)	28.2 (−2.1)	31.1 (−0.5)	40.2 (4.6)	48.3 (9.1)	57.7 (14.3)	68.4 (20.2)	74.4 (23.6)	72.1 (22.3)	63.6 (17.6)	49.9 (9.9)	37.6 (3.1)	28.3 (−2.1)	50.0 (10.0)
Mean daily minimum °F (°C)	15.9 (−8.9)	18.2 (−7.7)	25.9 (−3.4)	34.6 (1.4)	44.7 (7.1)	55.3 (12.9)	61.3 (16.3)	58.9 (14.9)	48.8 (9.3)	35.3 (1.8)	24.0 (−4.4)	16.0 (−8.9)	36.6 (2.5)
Mean minimum °F (°C)	−5.4 (−20.8)	−2.5 (−19.2)	8.0 (−13.3)	19.7 (−6.8)	29.2 (−1.6)	43.6 (6.4)	51.4 (10.8)	48.5 (9.2)	35.3 (1.8)	16.9 (−8.4)	5.4 (−14.8)	−4.2 (−20.1)	−12.0 (−24.4)
Record low °F (°C)	−34 (−37)	−30 (−34)	−23 (−31)	−8 (−22)	19 (−7)	32 (0)	35 (2)	38 (3)	16 (−9)	−3 (−19)	−14 (−26)	−38 (−39)	−38 (−39)
Average precipitation inches (mm)	0.41 (10)	0.41 (10)	1.00 (25)	1.77 (45)	3.00 (76)	3.20 (81)	2.33 (59)	2.79 (71)	1.52 (39)	1.43 (36)	0.41 (10)	0.29 (7.4)	18.56 (469.4)
Average snowfall inches (cm)	3.7 (9.4)	4.0 (10)	3.3 (8.4)	2.3 (5.8)	0.1 (0.25)	0.0 (0.0)	0.0 (0.0)	0.0 (0.0)	0.0 (0.0)	2.0 (5.1)	2.8 (7.1)	3.5 (8.9)	21.7 (54.95)
Average precipitation days (≥ 0.01 in)	1.5	2.5	3.9	5.7	8.1	7.9	7.0	6.8	4.7	4.6	2.3	1.3	56.3
Average snowy days (≥ 0.1 in)	1.8	2.2	1.5	1.1	0.1	0.0	0.0	0.0	0.0	0.8	1.3	1.7	10.5
Source 1: NOAA
Source 2: National Weather Service

== Demographics ==
Historical population
Census	Pop.	Note	%±
1890	202		—
1900	371		83.7%
1910	962		159.3%
1920	1,320		37.2%
1930	1,467		11.1%
1940	1,619		10.4%
1950	1,951		20.5%
1960	1,840		−5.7%
1970	1,578		−14.2%
1980	1,528		−3.2%
1990	1,295		−15.2%
2000	1,467		13.3%
2010	1,225		−16.5%
2020	1,307		6.7%

=== 2020 census ===
As of the 2020 census, Julesburg had a population of 1,307. The median age was 49.6 years. 20.6% of residents were under the age of 18 and 28.2% of residents were 65 years of age or older. For every 100 females there were 92.5 males, and for every 100 females age 18 and over there were 92.9 males age 18 and over.

0.0% of residents lived in urban areas, while 100.0% lived in rural areas.

There were 591 households in Julesburg, of which 24.4% had children under the age of 18 living in them. Of all households, 41.1% were married-couple households, 23.5% were households with a male householder and no spouse or partner present, and 29.9% were households with a female householder and no spouse or partner present. About 36.6% of all households were made up of individuals and 20.8% had someone living alone who was 65 years of age or older.

There were 702 housing units, of which 15.8% were vacant. The homeowner vacancy rate was 1.3% and the rental vacancy rate was 8.6%.

Racial composition as of the 2020 census
Race	Number	Percent
White	1,112	85.1%
Black or African American	4	0.3%
American Indian and Alaska Native	15	1.1%
Asian	8	0.6%
Native Hawaiian and Other Pacific Islander	1	0.1%
Some other race	64	4.9%
Two or more races	103	7.9%
Hispanic or Latino (of any race)	215	16.4%

== Buildings ==
The Sedgwick County Courthouse is an Art Deco style building constructed between 1938–1939. It is three-storeys tall and measures 58 feet by 80 feet.

== Education ==
The Julesburg School District operates public schools.

== Notable person ==
- Clayton Thyne, Dean of West Virginia University's Eberly College of Arts and Sciences

== In popular culture ==
- "Julesburg" is the title of the second episode (1955) of the ABC western Cheyenne.
- Julesburg was featured in the 1960 episode "The Story of Julesburg" of the syndicated television series Pony Express.
- A 2019 YouTube video by Voice of America News features Julesburg as the backdrop for a short documentary about Charmaine Teodoro, a math teacher from the Philippines who is currently working at Julesburg High School.

== See also ==
- Pony Express National Historic Trail
