= Josephy Center for Arts and Culture =

The Josephy Center for Arts and Culture
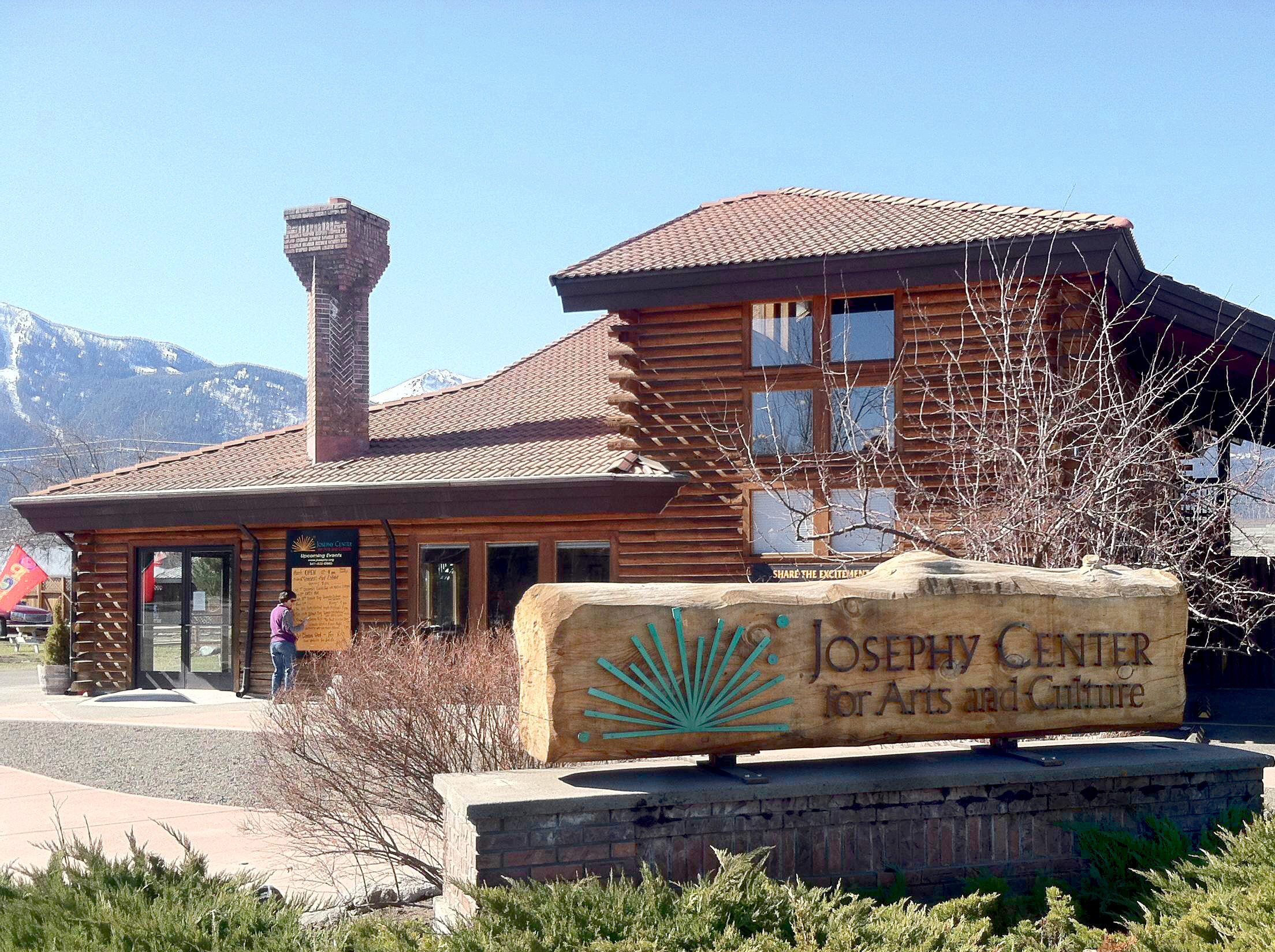
- Formation: 2012
- Founder: Anne Stephens
- Registration no.: 46-0685338
- Location: Joseph, Oregon
- Coordinates: 45.356049°N 117.230398°W
- Executive Director: Cheryl Coughlan
- Board of directors: Kendrick Moholt, Tim Norman, Susan Gilstrap, Marky Pitts, Rodd Ambroson, Nancy Knoble, Sharon Nall, Melissa Josephy
- Staff: Cheryl Coughlan, Rich Wandschneider
- Website: www.josephy.org

The Josephy Center for Arts and Culture is a community-based arts center located in Joseph, Oregon, United States. It hosts monthly exhibits, a variety of workshops, classes, film showings, and guest speakers. The Center is a registered 501(c)(3) non-profit and is run almost entirely through grants and donations.

== History ==
In 2010 several citizens of Joseph, Oregon came together to discuss the idea of a community arts center. In 2012 a generous patron purchased a spacious log building on the corner of Alder and Main. The Center has occupied this space ever since, using it to host monthly exhibits, talks, and film showings, and renting out the remainder as studio or class space. From 2012 to early 2015 the Maxville Heritage Interpretive Center rented exhibit space upstairs. Also upstairs, and linked with the Center, is the Alvin M. and Betty Josephy Library of Western History and Culture.

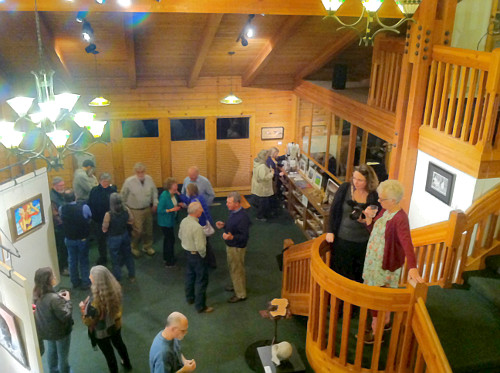
Executive Director Cheryl Coughlan (second from right) gives an announcement to a full house, during the opening of the second annual Women's Art Exhibit.

== Events ==
The Center holds a variety of weekly classes, including painting workshops, clay classes for kids, and other kids' art programs. It also provides space for a variety of community events, such as yoga, meditation, and chess club. At least twice a month the Center hosts film screenings about a variety of topics, including DamNation, Finding Vivian Maier, and Jean-Michel Basquiat: The Radiant Child.

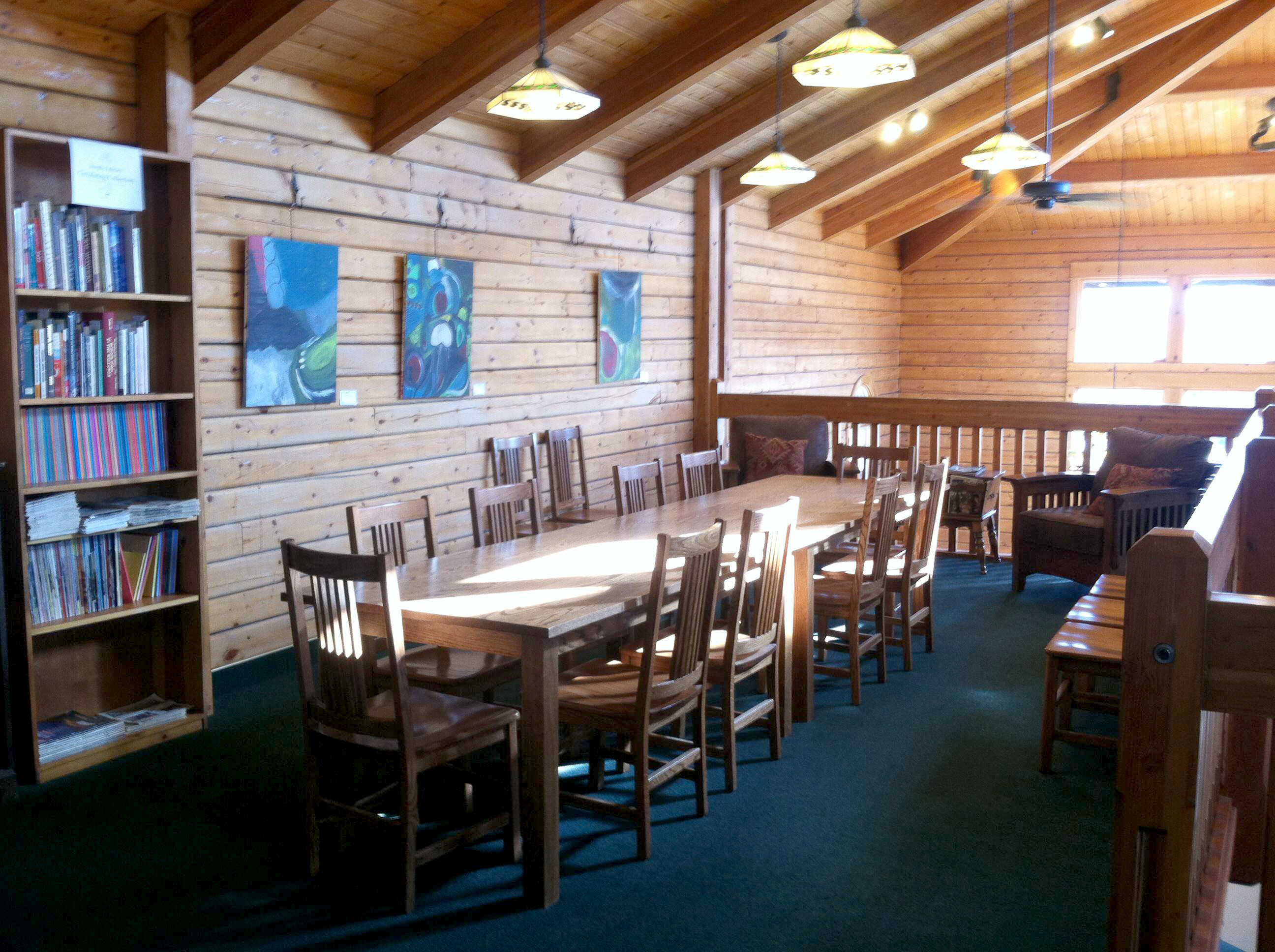
Upstairs in the Josephy Center - a meeting place for Brown Bag discussions and other events, next to the Library's lending shelf (left)

=== Monthly exhibits ===
Every month the Center holds a themed exhibit featuring up to twenty local artists. The majority of the art displayed is for sale. Some of the past exhibits are "Women's Art", "Black and White", "Art Outside the Box", "The Year of the Horse", and "The Art of War". In June 2015 the Center will host an exhibit of Native American art to coincide with the opening of the Nez Perce National Historical Park.
