= Eberly College of Arts and Sciences =

College of West Virginia University

- Former names: College of Arts and Sciences
- Type: Liberal Arts College
- Established: 1895
- Affiliations: West Virginia University
- President: Michael T. Benson
- Dean: Clayton Thyne
- Students: 5,258
- Location: Morgantown, West Virginia, United States of America; 39.63506967825566°N 79.95360363604382°W
- Campus: Rural
- Website: https://eberly.wvu.edu/

The Eberly College of Arts and Sciences is a liberal arts school of West Virginia University, a state university located in Morgantown, West Virginia. The college buildings are located on the downtown campus of the university. The college offers 29 undergraduate degrees, with both Bachelor of Science and Bachelor of Arts programs. Graduate programs are also offered in 15 fields of study, conferring either a Masters or Doctorate level degree.

== History ==
While liberal arts studies were offered since the founding of West Virginia University in 1867, the College of Arts and Sciences was not established until 1895. The Board of Visitors organized the college into different departments, focusing on mental and moral sciences, ancient languages, literature, mathematics, and natural sciences.

On July 1, 1993 the College of Arts and Sciences was formally dedicated to the Eberly family, of which Robert Eberly is a member.

In August 2023, budget cuts to Eberly College were announced. This included the elimination of the Department of World Languages, among other programs. Student walkouts and protests followed the cuts, with many calling for the resignation of the West Virginia University president at the time, E. Gordon Gee.

In 2026, Clayton Thyne was appointed as Dean of Eberly College, replacing Gregory Dunaway.

== Academic Programs ==
The college offers undergraduate, graduate, and doctoral programs. Major programs include Political science, Chemistry, Biology, Psychology, Literature, and Physics. As of 2023, students can no longer declare foreign languages as their major.

== Student Profile ==
Eberly College is West Virginia University's largest college by student population, with 4,507 undergraduate students as of Fall 2025. The college also hosts 751 graduate students.

As of Fall 2025, 307 professors and faculty members were working in the Eberly College of Arts and Sciences.

Student demographics as of Fall 2025
Race and ethnicity	Total
White	78.5%
Two or more races	4.9%
Hispanic	5.6%
Black	3.3%
Asian	1.7%
International student	3.8%
Unknown	2.0%
Gender Makeup
Male	35.2%
Female	64.8%

== Rankings ==
In 2017, Eberly's Political Science graduate program was ranked in the Top 100 in the United States.

== Gallery ==
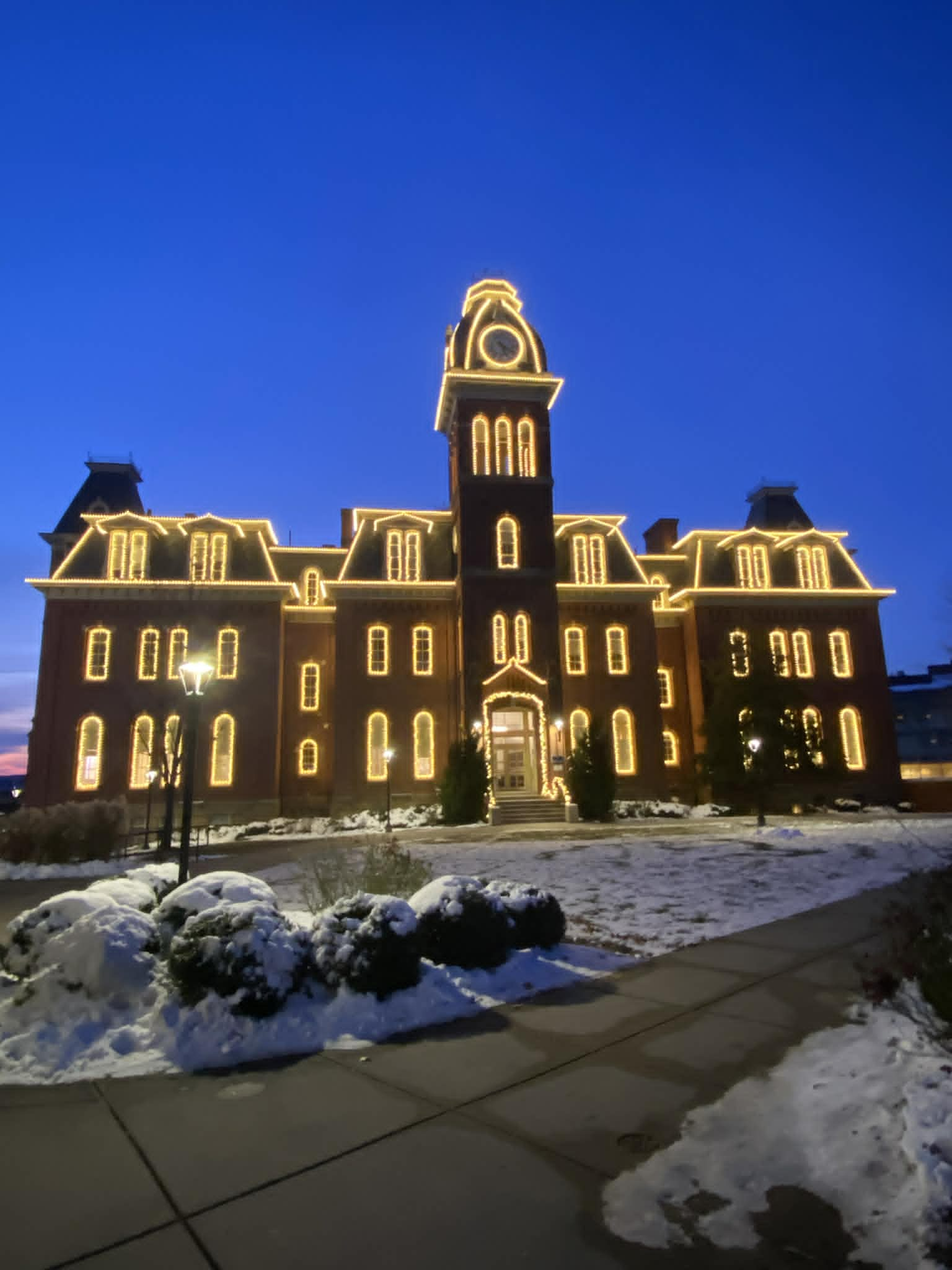
Woodburn Hall, the home of Eberly College.
