= Julesburg School District =

School district in Colorado, United States

Address
- 102 West 6th Street Julesburg, Colorado, 80737; United States

District information
- Type: Public
- Grades: PreK–12
- NCES District ID: 0804860

Students and staff
- Students: 1,021
- Teachers: 54.92
- Staff: 26.42
- Student–teacher ratio: 18.59

Other information
- Website: www.julesburg.org

Julesburg School District Re-1 is a school district headquartered in Julesburg, Colorado.

The district has two schools: the Elementary School and the Jr/Sr High School.
