= List of high schools in Colorado =

List of high schools in the U.S. State of Colorado

Coordinates: 38.9972°N 105.5478°W

The location of the State of Colorado in the United States

This is a list of high schools in the state of Colorado by its county. There are 648 total.

== Adams County ==
- Bennett High School, Bennett
- Prairie View High School, Henderson

=== Brighton ===
- Brighton Heritage Academy
- Brighton High School
- Eagle Ridge Academy
- Elmwood Baptist Academy

=== Commerce City ===
- Adams City High School
- Lester R. Arnold High School

=== Federal Heights ===
- The Pinnacle Charter School High School
- Rocky Mountain Lutheran High School

=== Northglenn ===
- Colorado Virtual Academy
- Community Christian
- Northglenn High School
- Vantage Point High School
- Westgate Charter

=== Strasburg ===
- Prairie Creeks Charter School
- Strasburg High School

=== Thornton ===
- Academy High School
- FutureForward at Bollman
- Horizon High School
- Mapleton Early College High School
- Mapleton Expeditionary School Of The Arts
- The New America School
- North Valley School For Young Adults
- Pathways Future Center
- Riverdale Ridge High School
- Stargate School
- Thornton High School
- York International

=== Westminster (Adams County) ===
- Academy of Charter Schools
- Belleview Christian School
- Cornerstone Christian Academy
- Goal Academy
- Hidden Lake High School
- Life Christian Academy
- Mountain Range High School
- Westminster High School
- Westminster K-12 Virtual Academy

== Alamosa County ==
- Alamosa High School, Alamosa
- Sangre De Cristo Undivided High School, Mosca

== Arapahoe County ==
- Calvary Apostolic Academy, Holly Hills
- Deer Trail High School, Deer Trail
- Eaglecrest High School, near Aurora and Centennial
- Sheridan High School, Sheridan

=== Aurora ===
- Aurora Central High School
- Aurora Science & Tech High School
- Aurora West College Preparatory Academy
- Cedar Wood Christian Academy - Adams County
- Cherokee Trail High School
- Colorado Early Colleges Aurora High School
- Gateway High School
- Grandview High School
- Lotus School For Excellence
- New Legacy Charter School - Adams County
- Options School - Adams County
- Overland High School
- Rangeview High School
- Regis Jesuit High School
- Smoky Hill High School
- Vanguard Classical School East
- Vista Peak 9-12 Preparatory
- William C. Hinkley High School
- William Smith High School

=== Byers ===
- Byers High School
- Great Plains Academy

=== Centennial ===
- Arapahoe High School

=== Cherry Hills Village ===
- Kent Denver School
- St. Mary's Academy

=== Englewood ===
- Colorado's Finest Alternative High School
- Englewood High School
- Englewood Leadership Academy
- Humanex Academy
- The Joshua School

=== Greenwood Village ===
- Cherry Creek High School
- Colorado Provost Academy

=== Littleton (Arapahoe County) ===
- Heritage High School
- Littleton High School
- Rock Solid High School

=== Watkins ===
- Our Lady Help Of Christians Academy
- Ridge View Academy Charter School

== Archuleta County ==
- Pagosa Springs High School, Pagosa Springs

== Baca County ==
- Campo Undivided High School, Campo
- Pritchett High School, Pritchett
- Springfield High School, Springfield
- Vilas Undivided High School, Vilas
- Walsh High School, Walsh

== Bent County ==
- Las Animas High School, Las Animas
- McClave High School, McClave

== Boulder County ==
- Nederland High School, Nederland
- Lyons High School, Lyons
- Niwot High School, Niwot
- Monarch High School, Louisville

=== Boulder ===
- Arapahoe Ridge High School
- Boulder Explore
- Boulder High School
- Boulder Prep Charter High School
- Boulder TEC
- Boulder Universal Online School
- Fairview High School
- Halcyon School
- Hillside School
- Mountain Shadows Montessori School
- New Vista High School
- September School
- Shining Mountain Waldorf School
- Tara Performing Arts High School
- Watershed School

=== Lafayette ===
- Alexander Dawson School
- Catalyst High School
- Centaurus High School
- Justice High Charter School
- Peak To Peak Charter School

=== Longmont ===
- Desiderata School
- Faith Baptist School
- Longmont Christian School
- Longmont High School
- Mead High School
- Messiahville Baptist Academy
- Olde Columbine High School
- Silver Creek High School
- Skyline High School
- St. Vrain Global Online Academy
- Twin Peaks Charter Academy

== Broomfield County ==
=== Broomfield ===
- Broomfield High School
- Holy Family High School
- Legacy High School
- Prospect Ridge Academy

== Chaffee County ==
=== Buena Vista ===
- Buena Vista High School
- Buena Vista Online Academy
- Chaffee County High School
- Darren Patterson Christian Academy
- The Link School

=== Salida ===
- Horizons Exploratory Academy
- Salida High School

== Cheyenne County ==
- Cheyenne Wells High School, Cheyenne Wells
- Kit Carson High School, Kit Carson

== Clear Creek County ==
- Clear Creek High School, Evergreen

== Conejos County ==
- Antonito High School, Antonito
- Sanford High School, Sanford

=== La Jara ===
- Centauri High School
- La Jara Second Chance School

== Costilla County ==
- Centennial High School, San Luis
- Sierra Grande High School, Blanca

== Crowley County ==
- Crowley County High School, Ordway

== Custer County ==
- Custer County High School, Westcliffe

== Delta County ==
- Hotchkiss High School, Hotchkiss
- Paonia High School, Paonia

=== Cedaredge ===
- Cedaredge High School
- Surface Creek Vision School

=== Delta ===
- Delta County Opportunity School
- Delta County Virtual Academy
- Delta High School
- Delta Vision School
- North Fork Vision School

== Denver County (City of Denver) ==
=== Early colleges ===
- CEC Early College
- Dr. Martin Luther King, Jr. Early College
- Northeast Early College

=== Private/religious ===
- Accelerated Schools
- Arrupe Jesuit High School
- Augustine Classical Academy
- Beth Jacob High School
- Bishop Machebeuf Catholic High School
- Change Christian Academy
- Colorado Academy - Jefferson County
- Denver Academy
- Denver Academy of Torah
- Denver Christian Schools
- Denver Jewish Day School
- Denver Waldorf School
- Mile High Adventist Academy
- Mullen High School
- Yeshiva Toras Chaim

=== Public/magnet/charter ===
- 5280 High School
- Abraham Lincoln High School
- Academy Of Urban Learning
- Bruce Randolph School
- Collegiate Preparatory Academy
- Colorado High School Charter
- Compassion Road Academy
- Contemporary Learning Academy High School
- DELTA High School
- Denver Center for 21st Learning At Wyman
- Denver Justice High School
- Denver Montessori Junior/Senior High School
- Denver Online High School
- East High School
- Excel Academy-Denver
- Florence Crittenton High School
- George Washington High School
- Global Leadership Academy - Mapleton Public Schools
- John F. Kennedy High School
- KIPP (Denver Collegiate High School, Northeast Denver Leadership Academy
- Legacy Options High School
- Manual High School
- Montbello High School
- North High School
- Northfield High School
- PREP Academy
- Respect Academy
- RiseUp Community School
- South High School
- STRIVE Prep (RISE, SMART Academy)
- Summit Academy
- Thomas Jefferson High School
- Vista Academy
- West High School

=== Special-focus ===
- Denver Center for International Studies (Ford, Montbello)
- Denver School of the Arts
- Denver School of Innovation and Sustainable Design
- DSST Public Schools (Cedar, Cole, College View, Conservatory Green, Green Valley Ranch, Montview, Elevate)
- Emily Griffith Technical College
- Girls Athletic Leadership High School
- Kunsmiller Creative Arts Academy
- Noel Community Arts School
- Robert F. Smith STEAM Academy
- Rocky Mountain School of Expeditionary Learning

== Dolores County ==
- Dove Creek High School, Dove Creek

== Douglas County ==
=== Castle Rock ===
- Castle View High School
- Daniel C Oakes High School
- Douglas County High School

=== Highlands Ranch ===
- Eagle Academy
- Highlands Ranch High School
- Japanese School Of Denver
- Mountain Vista High School
- Rock Canyon High School
- Skyview Academy
- STEM School Highlands Ranch
- Thunderridge High School
- Valor Christian High School

=== Parker ===
- Chaparral High School
- Legend High School
- Lutheran High School
- Ponderosa High School

== Eagle County ==
- Vail Mountain School, Vail
- Vail Ski And Snowboard Academy, Minturn
- World Academy, Eagle

=== Edwards ===
- Battle Mountain High School
- Red Canyon High School
- Vail Christian School

=== Gypsum ===
- Eagle Valley High School
- New America Charter School

== El Paso County ==
- Calhan High School, Calhan
- Ellicott High School, Ellicott
- Manitou Springs High School, Manitou Springs
- Miami-Yoder High School, Rush

=== Academy SD-20 Colorado Springs ===
- Air Academy High School, USAF Academy
- Aspen Valley High School
- The Classical Academy
- Discovery Canyon Campus School
- Liberty High School
- Pine Creek High School
- Rampart High School

=== Colorado Springs private/religious ===
- Colorado School for the Deaf and Blind
- Colorado Springs Christian Schools
- The Colorado Springs School
- Evangelical Christian Academy
- Fountain Valley School Of Colorado
- Pikes Peak Christian School
- Rocky Mountain Montessori Academy
- St Mary's High School
- The University School

=== Colorado Springs SD-11 ===
- Achieve Online School
- The Bijou School
- CIVA Charter High School
- Colorado Early Colleges Colorado Springs
- Community Prep Charter School
- Coronado High School
- Doherty High School
- Eastlake High School
- Mitchell High School
- Odyssey Early College/Career Options
- Palmer High School
- Pikes Peak Prep
- Tesla Educational Opportunity School
- Thomas MacLaren State Charter School (within district borders)

=== Falcon SD-49 (Colorado Springs) ===
- Banning Lewis Academy
- Pikes Peak Early College
- Power Technical Early College
- Rocky Mountain Classical Academy
- Sand Creek High School
- Springs Studio for Academic Excellence
- Vista Ridge High School

=== Falcon SD-49 (Falcon) ===
- Falcon Virtual Academy
- Liberty Tree Academy
- Pikes Peak School of Expeditionary Learning

=== Falcon SD-49 (Peyton) ===
- Falcon High School
- Patriot High School
- Peyton Senior High School

=== Fountain-Fort Carson SD-8 ===
- Fountain-Fort Carson High School
- Welte Education Center

=== Harrison SD-2 ===
- Atlas Preparatory School
- Harrison High School
- James Irwin Charter High School
- Sierra High School
- The Vanguard School

=== Monument ===
- Lewis-Palmer High School
- Palmer Ridge High School

=== Widefield SD-3 ===
- Discovery High School
- Mesa Ridge High School, Colorado Springs
- Widefield High School

=== Yoder ===
- Edison Academy
- Edison High School

=== Other districts ===
- Cheyenne Mountain High School, Colorado Springs Cheyenne Mountain SD-12
- Hanover Junior-Senior High School, Colorado Springs Hanover SD-28

== Elbert County ==
- Elbert High School, Elbert
- Kiowa High School, Kiowa
- Simla High School, Simla

=== Elizabeth ===
- Elizabeth High School
- Frontier High School

== Fremont County ==
- Cotopaxi High School, Cotopaxi

=== Cañon City ===
- Calvary Christian School
- Canon City High School
- Canon Online Academy

=== Florence ===
- Florence Christian School
- Florence Junior/Senior High School

== Garfield County ==
- Grand Valley High School, Parachute
- Rifle High School, Rifle

=== Carbondale ===
- Bridges High School
- Colorado Rocky Mountain School
- Roaring Fork High School

=== Glenwood Springs ===
- Glenwood Springs High School
- Yampah Mountain High School

=== New Castle ===
- Coal Ridge High School
- Liberty Classical Academy

== Gilpin County ==
- Gilpin County Undivided High School, Black Hawk

== Grand County ==
- Grand County Christian Academy, Tabernash
- Middle Park High School, Granby
- West Grand High School, Kremmling

== Gunnison County ==
- Crested Butte Community School, Crested Butte
- Gunnison High School, Gunnison
- Marble Charter School, Marble

== Hinsdale County ==
- Lake City Community School, Lake City

== Huerfano County ==
- John Mall High School, Walsenburg
- La Veta High School, La Veta

== Jackson County ==
- North Park High School, Walden

== Jefferson County ==
- Columbine High School, Columbine
- Conifer High School, Conifer
- Dakota Ridge High School, Dakota Ridge
- Evergreen High School, Evergreen
- Jefferson Academy Charter School, Broomfield
- Jefferson High School, Edgewater

=== Arvada ===
- Arvada High School
- Arvada West High School
- Early College of Arvada - Adams County
- Excel Academy
- Faith Christian Academy
- Pomona High School
- Ralston Valley High School
- Warren Tech North

=== Golden ===
- Compass Montessori School
- Connections Learning Center
- Golden High School
- Jeffco Virtual Academy
- Rocky Mountain Deaf School

=== Lakewood ===
- Alameda International Junior/Senior High School
- Bear Creek High School
- Brady Exploration School
- Denver Street School
- D'Evelyn Junior/Senior High School
- Green Mountain High School
- Jefferson County Open School
- Lakewood High School
- Long View High School
- The Manning School
- McLain High School
- New America School
- Sobesky Academy
- Warren Tech

=== Littleton (Jefferson County) ===
- Chatfield High School
- Collegiate Academy Of Colorado
- Front Range Christian School

=== Westminster (Jefferson County) ===
- Hyland Christian School
- Standley Lake High School

=== Wheat Ridge ===
- Beth Eden Baptist School
- Wheat Ridge High School

== Kiowa County ==
- Eads High School, Eads
- Plainview High School, Sheridan Lake

== Kit Carson County ==
- Bethune High School, Bethune
- Burlington High School, Burlington
- Flagler Senior High School, Flagler
- High Plains Undivided High School, Seibert
- Stratton Senior High School, Stratton

== La Plata County ==
- Bayfield High School, Bayfield
- Ignacio High School, Ignacio

=== Durango ===
- Animas High School
- Colorado Timberline Academy
- Durango Big Picture High School
- Durango High School
- Grace Preparatory Academy Of Durango
- Southwest Colorado eSchool

== Lake County ==
=== Leadville ===
- High Mountain Institute
- Lake County High School

== Larimer County ==
- Berthoud High School, Berthoud

=== Estes Park ===
- Eagle Rock School
- Estes Park High School
- Estes Park Options School

=== Fort Collins ===
- Centennial High School
- Colorado Early Colleges Fort Collins
- Fort Collins High School
- Fort Collins Montessori School
- Fossil Ridge High School
- Front Range Baptist Academy
- Heritage Christian Academy
- Liberty Common High School
- Polaris Expeditionary Learning School
- Poudre Community Academy
- Poudre High School
- PSD Global Academy
- Ridgeview Classical Charter Schools
- Rocky Mountain High School

=== Loveland ===
- Harold Ferguson High School
- Leap School
- Loveland Classical School
- Loveland High School
- Mountain View High School
- Resurrection Christian School
- Thompson Online School
- Thompson Valley High School

== Las Animas County ==
- Aguilar High School, Aguilar
- Branson Undivided High School, Branson
- Kim Undivided High School, Kim
- Primero Junior-Senior High School, Weston

=== Trinidad ===
- Hoehne High School
- Holy Trinity Academy
- Trinidad High School

== Lincoln County ==
- Genoa-Hugo High School, Hugo
- Karval Junior-Senior High School, Karval
- Limon High School, Limon

== Logan County ==
- Caliche High School, Iliff
- Fleming High School, Fleming
- Merino High School, Merino
- Peetz High School, Peetz

=== Sterling ===
- Smith High School
- Sterling High School

== Mesa County ==
- De Beque Undivided High School, De Beque
- Fruita Monument High School, Fruita
- Gateway School, Gateway
- Palisade High School, Palisade

=== Collbran ===
- Grand Mesa High School
- Plateau Valley High School

=== Grand Junction ===
- Caprock Academy
- Central High School
- Grand Junction High School
- Grand River Virtual Academy
- Landmark Baptist School
- Life Academy
- Pear Park Baptist School
- R-5 High School

== Mineral County ==
- Creede High School, Creede

== Moffat County ==
- Moffat County High School, Craig

== Montezuma County ==
- Dolores High School, Dolores
- Mancos High School, Mancos

=== Cortez ===
- Lighthouse Christian Academy
- Montezuma-Cortez High School
- Southwest Open Charter School

== Montrose County ==
- Nucla High School, Nucla
- Olathe High School, Olathe

=== Montrose ===
- Montrose High School
- Peak Virtual Academy
- Vista Charter School

== Morgan County ==
- Brush High School, Brush
- Weldon Valley High School, Weldona
- Wiggins High School, Wiggins

=== Fort Morgan ===
- Fort Morgan High School
- Lincoln High School

== Otero County ==
- Cheraw High School, Cheraw
- Fowler High School, Fowler
- La Junta High School, La Junta
- Manzanola High School, Manzanola
- Rocky Ford Junior Senior High School, Rocky Ford
- Swink High School, Swink

== Ouray County ==
- Ouray High School, Ouray
- Ridgway High School, Ridgway

== Park County ==
- Platte Canyon High School, Bailey
- South Park High School, Fairplay

== Phillips County ==
- Haxtun High School, Haxtun
- Holyoke Senior High School, Holyoke

== Pitkin County ==
- Aspen High School, Aspen
- Basalt High School, Basalt

== Prowers County ==
- Granada Undivided High School, Granada
- Holly High School, Holly
- Lamar High School, Lamar
- Wiley High School, Wiley

== Pueblo County ==
- Pueblo County High School, Vineland
- Rye High School, Rye

=== Pueblo ===
- Centennial High School
- Central High School
- Chavez/Huerta K-12 Preparatory Academy
- East High School
- Pueblo School for Arts and Sciences
- South High School
- St Therese Catholic School

=== Pueblo West ===
- Pueblo West High School
- Swallows Charter Academy

== Rio Blanco County ==
- Meeker High School, Meeker
- Rangely High School, Rangely

== Rio Grande County ==
- Del Norte High School, Del Norte

=== Monte Vista ===
- Byron Syring Delta Center
- Monte Vista High School
- Monte Vista Online Academy
- Sargent Senior High School

== Routt County ==
- Hayden High School, Hayden
- Soroco High School, Oak Creek

=== Steamboat Springs ===
- Steambout Mountain School
- Steamboat Springs High School
- Yampa Valley School

== Saguache County ==
- Crestone Charter School, Crestone
- Moffat Senior High School, Moffat
- Mountain Valley Senior High School, Saguache

=== Center ===
- The Academic Recovery Center of San Luis Valley
- Center High School
- Center Virtual Academy

== San Juan County ==
- Silverton High School, Silverton

== San Miguel County ==
- Norwood High School, Norwood

=== Telluride ===
- Telluride High School
- Telluride Mountain School

== Sedgwick County ==
- Julesburg High School, Julesburg
- Revere High School, Ovid

== Summit County ==
=== Frisco ===
- Snowy Peaks High School
- Summit High School

== Teller County ==
- Cripple Creek-Victor Junior/Senior High School, Cripple Creek
- Woodland Park High School, Woodland Park

== Washington County ==
- Akron High School, Akron
- Arickaree School, Anton
- Woodlin Undivided High School, Woodrow

=== Otis ===
- Lone Star School
- Otis High School

== Weld County ==
- Briggsdale Undivided High School, Briggsdale
- Eaton High School, Eaton
- Erie High School, Erie
- Fort Lupton High School, Fort Lupton
- Frederick High School, Frederick
- Highland High School, Ault
- Pawnee High School, Grover
- Platte Valley High School, Kersey
- Prairie High School, Raymer
- Roosevelt High School, Johnstown
- Severance High School, Severance
- Valley High School, Gilcrest
- Weld Central Senior High School, Keenesburg
- Windsor High School, Windsor

=== Greeley ===
- Centennial BOCES High School
- Dayspring Christian Academy
- Early College Academy
- Frontier Charter Academy
- Greeley Alternative Program
- Greeley Central High School
- Greeley West High School
- Jefferson High School
- Northridge High School
- Union Colony Preparatory
- University Schools

== Yuma County ==
- Idalia High School, Idalia
- Liberty High School, Joes
- Wray High School, Wray
- Yuma High School, Yuma

== See also ==
- Education in Colorado
- Table of Colorado charter schools
- Table of Colorado school districts
- Bibliography of Colorado
- Geography of Colorado
- History of Colorado
- Index of Colorado-related articles
- List of Colorado-related lists
- Outline of Colorado
- List of Colorado high schools without a Wikipedia article
