= Brush High School =

Brush High School may refer to:

- Brush High School (Colorado) — Brush, Colorado
- Charles F. Brush High School — Lyndhurst, Ohio
- Brush Ranch School, Inc. — Terrero, New Mexico
