= School District 60 =

School District 60 can refer to:

Canada

- School District 60 Peace River North

United States

- Higley Unified School District 60
- Maine School Administrative District 60
- Miami-Yoder School District JT-60
- Pueblo School District 60
- Waukegan Community Unit School District 60
