= Hanover High School =

Hanover High School is the name of several secondary schools in the United States:

- Hanover High School (Massachusetts) — Hanover, Massachusetts
- Hanover High School (New Hampshire) — Hanover, New Hampshire
- Hanover High School (Pennsylvania) — Hanover, Pennsylvania
- Hanover High School (Mechanicsville, Virginia) — Mechanicsville, Virginia
- Hanover Central Junior-Senior High School — Cedar Lake, Indiana
- Hanover-Horton High School — Horton, Michigan
- Hanover Junior-Senior High School — Colorado Springs, Colorado
- Hanover Park High School — East Hanover, New Jersey
- New Hanover High School — Wilmington, North Carolina
