= Bennett High School (Colorado) =

Location
- 610 7th St; Bennett, Colorado 80102; United States
- Coordinates: 39°45′39″N 104°25′32″W

Information
- Type: Public secondary school
- School district: Bennett 29J
- CEEB code: 060090
- Dean: Melissa Klomp
- Faculty: 23.73 (FTE)
- Grades: 9-12
- Student to teacher ratio: 18.92
- Colors: Orange and black
- Athletics: 3A Frontier League
- Mascot: Tiger
- Website: hs.bsd29j.com

Bennett High School is a secondary school located in Bennett, Colorado, United States.

Vocational programs at Bennett are offered in business, agriculture, and industrial arts. Also available, through the T. H. Pickens Technical Center in Aurora, is a full range of auto, electronics, drafting, cosmetology, and health related programs.

Bennett's teams compete in the 3A Frontier League.

== See also ==
- List of high schools in Colorado
