= Englewood School District =

Englewood School District may refer to:

- Englewood Schools (Colorado)
- Englewood Public School District (New Jersey)
