= Pat Ballage =

American football player (born 1964)

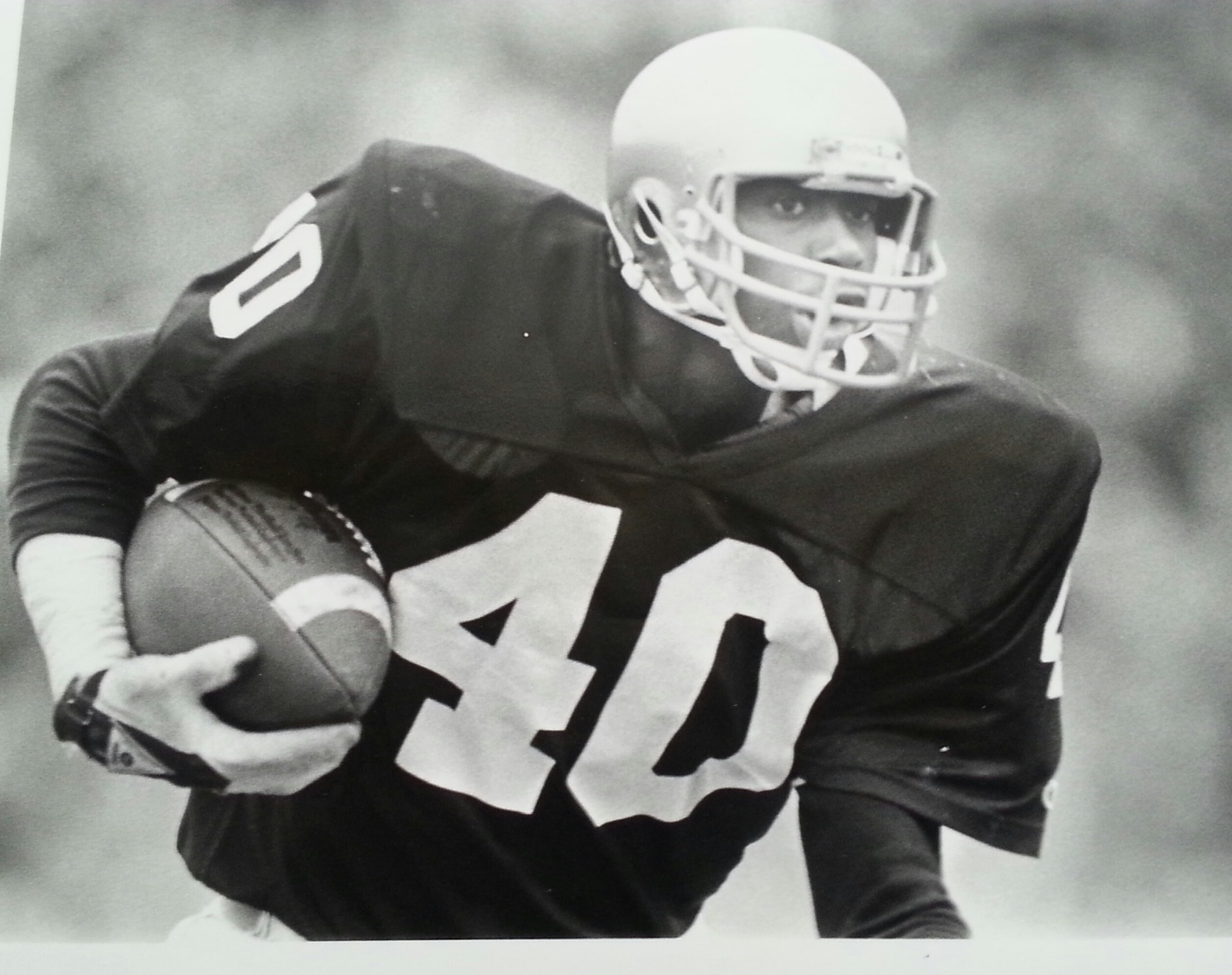
- Pat Ballage

No. 26, 40
- Position: Safety

Personal information
- Born: April 8, 1964 (age 62); Fort Hood, Texas, U.S.
- Listed height: 6 ft 1 in (1.85 m)
- Listed weight: 202 lb (92 kg)

Career information
- High school: Pueblo (CO) South
- College: Notre Dame
- NFL draft: 1986: undrafted

Career history
- Dallas Cowboys (1986)*; Indianapolis Colts (1986–1987)
- * Offseason or practice squad member only
- Stats at Pro Football Reference

Pat Ballage (born April 8, 1964) is an American former professional football player who was a defensive back in the National Football League (NFL). He played college football for the Notre Dame Fighting Irish before playing in the NFL for the Indianapolis Colts from 1986 to 1987.
