= Zack Golditch =

American football player (born 1995)

No. 65, 61, 75
- Position: Guard

Personal information
- Born: February 22, 1995 (age 31); Denver, Colorado
- Listed height: 6 ft 6 in (1.98 m)
- Listed weight: 300 lb (136 kg)

Career information
- High school: Gateway (Aurora, Colorado)
- College: Colorado State
- NFL draft: 2018: undrafted

Career history
- Los Angeles Chargers (2018)*; San Francisco 49ers (2018)*; Indianapolis Colts (2018)*; Arizona Cardinals (2018); Kansas City Chiefs (2019)*
- * Offseason or practice squad member only

Awards and highlights
- First-team All-Mountain West Conference (2017)

Career NFL statistics
- Games played: 2
- Games started: 0
- Stats at Pro Football Reference

Zack Golditch (born February 22, 1995) is a former American football guard. He played college football at Colorado State.

== College career ==
Golditch was a member of the Colorado State Rams football team for five seasons, redshirting his freshman season. Golditch started 38 games over the next four seasons for the Rams and was named first-team All-Mountain West as a senior.

== Professional career ==
=== Los Angeles Chargers ===
Golditch signed with the Los Angeles Chargers as an undrafted free agent on April 30, 2018. He was waived by the team at the end of the preseason.

=== San Francisco 49ers ===
Golditch was signed to the San Francisco 49ers practice squad on September 2, 2018. He was released by the 49ers on October 16, 2018.

=== Indianapolis Colts ===
Golditch was signed to the Indianapolis practice squad on October 18, 2018.

=== Arizona Cardinals ===
Golditch was signed to the Arizona Cardinals active roster off the Colts practice squad on November 5, 2018. He made his NFL debut on November 25, 2018, against the Los Angeles Chargers. He was waived on May 9, 2019.

=== Kansas City Chiefs ===
On May 10, 2019, Golditch was claimed off waivers by the Kansas City Chiefs. Golditch was waived by the Chiefs during final roster cuts on August 31, 2019.

Golditch was selected by the Tampa Bay Vipers in the 5th phase of the 2020 XFL draft. After the XFL folded, he ultimately decided to retire.

== Personal life ==
When he was a junior in high school, Golditch was wounded in the 2012 Aurora, Colorado shooting. He was not in the same theater room of the shooting. After retiring from football Golditch became a firefighter with South Metro Fire Rescue.
