= Aurora Central High School =

Public school in Colorado, United States

Coordinates: 39°43′56″N 104°51′08″W

Location
- 11700 East 11th Avenue; Aurora, Colorado 80010; United States

Information
- Type: Public high school
- Established: 1931
- School district: Adams-Arapahoe 28J
- CEEB code: 060070
- Principal: Kurtis Quig
- Staff: 127.00 (FTE)
- Grades: 9-12
- Student to teacher ratio: 17.76
- Colors: White, yellow, green, black
- Athletics: 5A
- Athletics conference: East Metro Athletic Conference (EMAC)
- Mascot: Trojans
- Website: central.aurorak12.org

Aurora Central High School is a high school in Aurora, Colorado. It was originally named Aurora High School and was the first high school in Aurora Public Schools. When Hinkley High School was built in 1963, this school was renamed to its present title. The first class to graduate from the existing location was the Class of 1956.

== School shooting ==
On November 15, 2021, around 12:45 P.M., a shooting happened at a small park close to the high school. Six students from the school were shot with non-life-threatening injuries. 30–50 shots were fired from people in a car and from people on foot. Four teenagers, three of whom are 15 while the fourth is 16, were later arrested and charged with attempted first degree murder. In January 2022, one of the teenagers, Daniel Ruelas, was indicted for attempted murder, assault and possessing a handgun as a juvenile. As of August 2026, Ruelas is being held in the Colorado Youthful Offender System with a release date in March 2029.

== Demographics ==
For the 2014–2015 school year, there were 2,188 students enrolled at Aurora Central High School. The student body demographics were as follows:

- 5% White
- 67% Latino
- 16% African American
- 8% Asian
- 1.4% Native American
- 2% Two or More Races

== Notable alumni ==
- Bob Barney, American academic and sports historian
- Dave Barney, American educator and swimming coach
- Danny Jackson, former MLB player (Kansas City Royals, Cincinnati Reds, Chicago Cubs, Pittsburgh Pirates, Philadelphia Phillies, St. Louis Cardinals, San Diego Padres)
- Robert Michael Pyle, author, lepidopterist
- Naquetta Ricks, businesswoman and member of the Colorado House of Representatives
- Michelle Waterson, professional mixed martial artist for the UFC's Strawweight division
- Don Young, former MLB player (Chicago Cubs)
