= Rush, Colorado =

Unincorporated community in El Paso County, CO, USA

- Unincorporated community
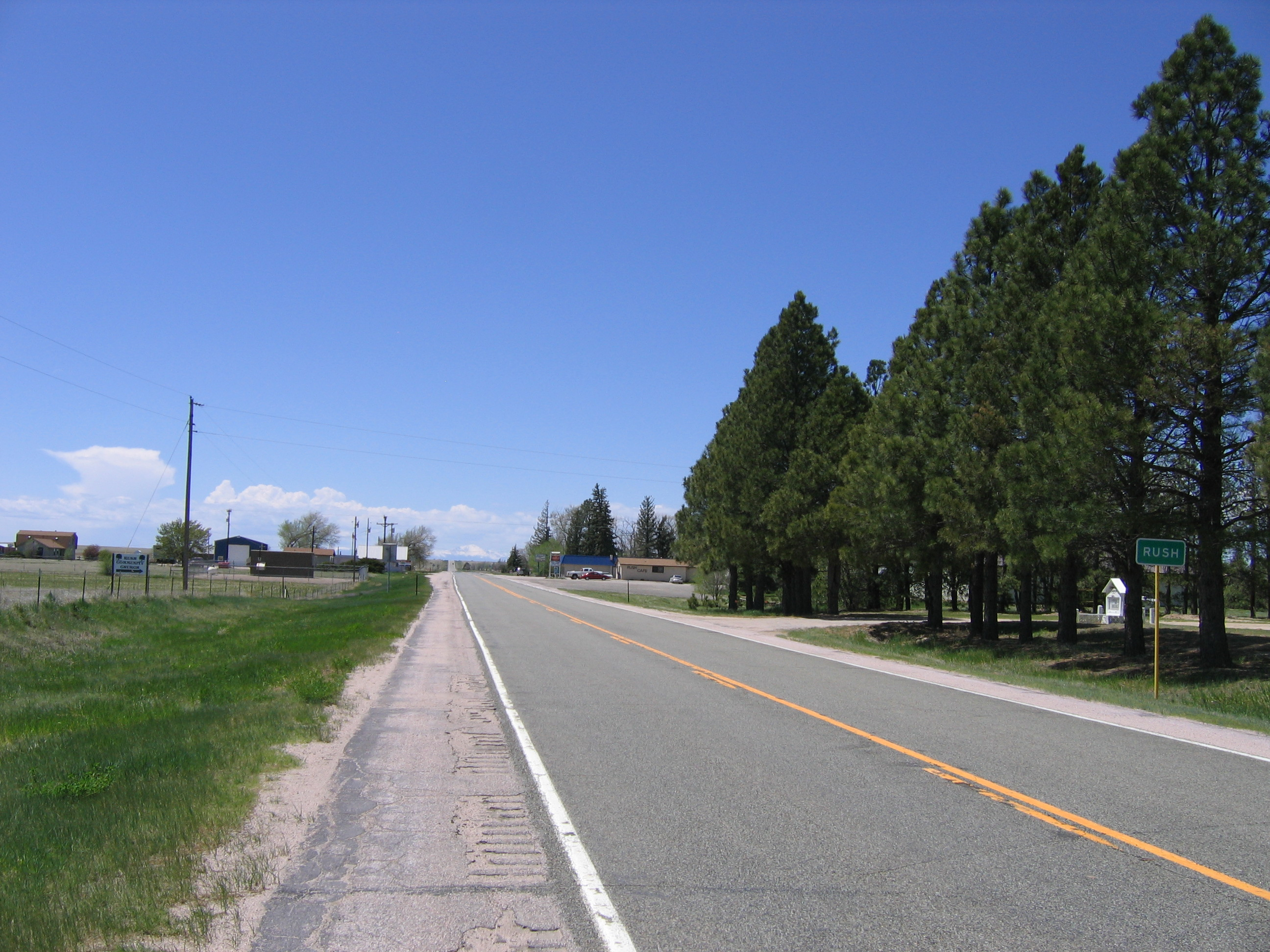
- Looking west down Highway 94, Pikes Peak is in the distance

- Location in El Paso County and the state of Colorado Rush (the United States)
- Coordinates: 38°50′24″N 104°05′32″W
- Country: United States
- State: State of Colorado
- County: El Paso County
- Elevation: 6,017 ft (1,834 m)
- Time zone: UTC-7 (MST)
  - Summer (DST): UTC-6 (MDT)
- ZIP code: 80833
- Area code: 719
- GNIS feature ID: 193570

Rush is an unincorporated community and a U.S. Post Office located in El Paso County, Colorado, United States.

Named for Christopher Rush, a homesteader from Missouri who settled there in 1907.

== Education ==
Miami-Yoder School District 60JT serves Rush.

== Geography ==
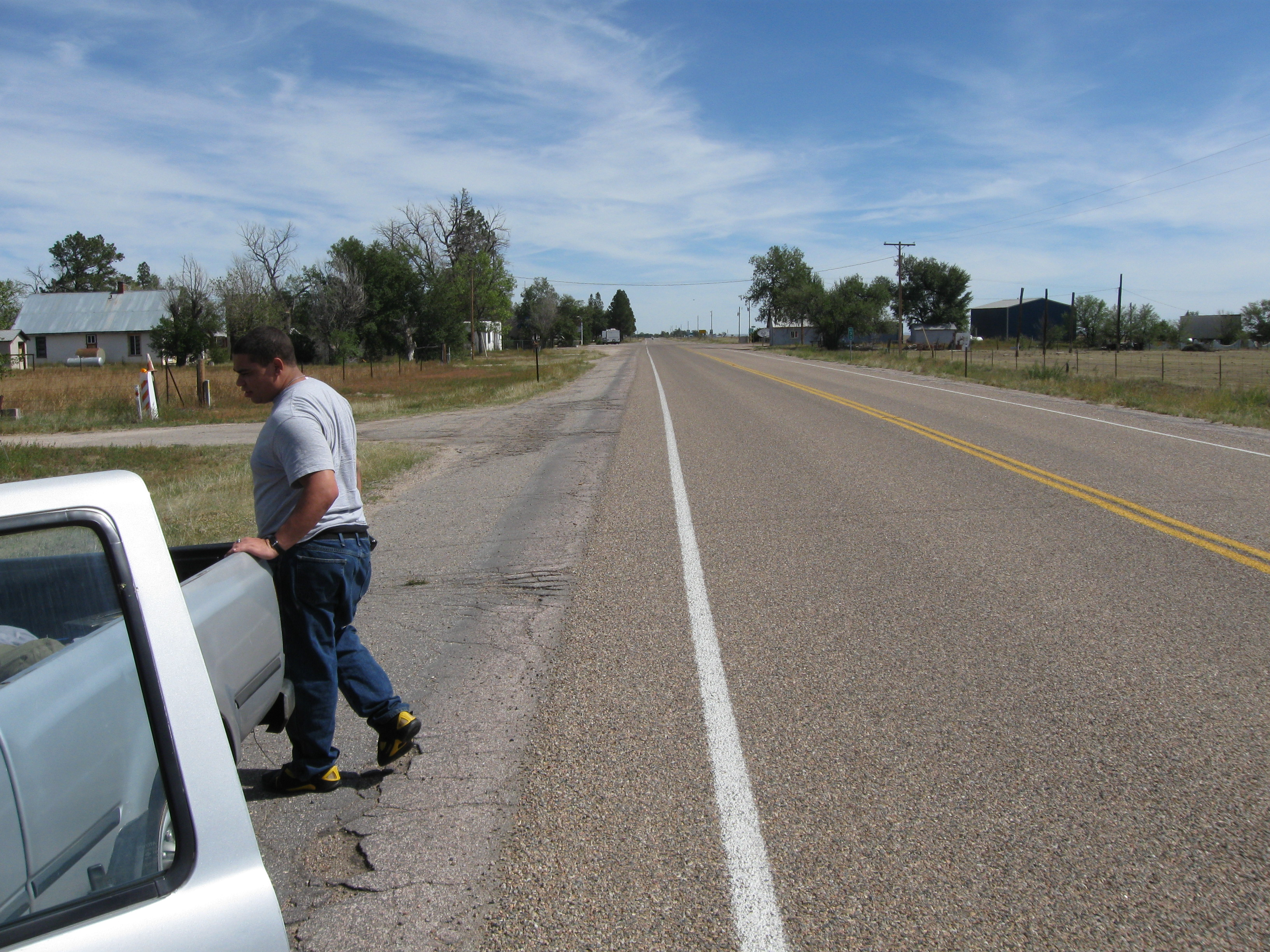
Rush Colorado, looking east

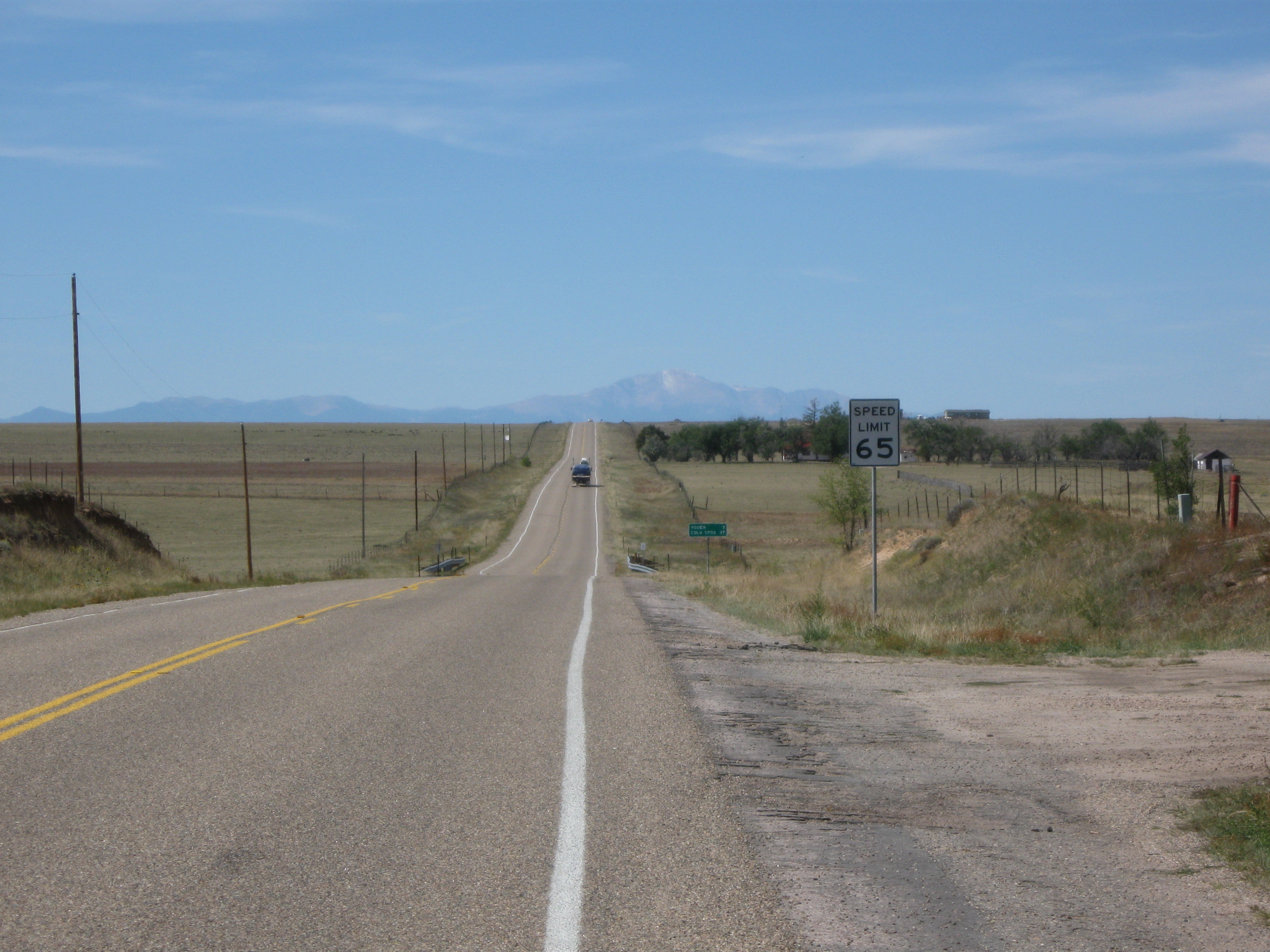
Pikes Peak from Rush, Colorado

Rush is located east of Yoder along State Highway 94 about 2 miles (3 km) west of the El Paso - Lincoln County line.

== See also ==
- List of cities and towns in Colorado
