= Hanover School District 28 =

School district near Colorado Springs, US

Address
- 17050 South Peyton Highway Colorado Springs, Colorado, 80928; United States
- Coordinates: 38°35′7″N 104°27′40″W

District information
- Type: Unified school district
- Motto: Own Your Education!
- Grades: P–12
- Superintendent: Mark McPherson
- School board: 5 members
- Schools: 1 elementary, 1 junior/senior high, 1 online
- Budget: $6,337,000
- NCES District ID: 0804500

Students and staff
- Students: 271 (2023–24)
- Teachers: 20.95 (on an FTE basis)
- Staff: 61.66 (on an FTE basis)
- Student–teacher ratio: 12.94
- District mascot: Hornet
- Colors: Blue and yellow

Other information
- Website: www.hanoverhornets.org

Hanover School District 28 is a school district serving rural areas of southern El Paso County, Colorado, including the unincorporated community of Wigwam. In the 2023–24 school year, the school district enrolled 271 students.

== List of schools ==
=== Elementary ===
Prairie Heights Elementary School

=== Middle/high ===
- Hanover Junior-Senior High School

== See also ==
- List of school districts in Colorado
