= Rangeview High School =

Public school in Colorado, United States

Location
- 17599 East Iliff Avenue; Aurora, Colorado 80013; United States; 39°40′32″N 104°46′53″W

Information
- Type: Public
- Established: 1983 (43 years ago)
- School district: Aurora Public Schools
- CEEB code: 060077
- Principal: Lisa Grosz
- Teaching staff: 102.40 (FTE)
- Grades: 9-12
- Student to teacher ratio: 20.29
- Colors: Red and black
- Athletics: 5A
- Athletics conference: East Metro Athletic Conference (EMAC)
- Mascot: Raider
- Website: rangeview.aurorak12.org

Rangeview High School is a public high school in Aurora, Colorado, United States. It is the second newest of five high schools in Aurora Public Schools. The school offers a variety of Advanced Placement courses.

The school is being used as a polling station and was featured on CNN, with Dan Simon reporting.

== Building ==
Rangeview High School was founded in 1983. The building holds over eighty academic classrooms, along with a library/media center that was built in 2004. The non-academic side consists of a large gymnasium, a small gymnasium, a standard swimming pool, an auditorium, a commons area, and a dual weight room. The original foundation of the school was built to serve roughly 1800 students; however, to meet population growth, Rangeview has added several portable classrooms adjacent to the building.

== Demographics ==
As of the 2014-15 school year:

- White 29.2%
- Hispanic 33.8%
- African American 24.9%
- Asian American 5.0%
- Native American 0.9%

== Athletics ==
Girls' cross country

- State Champion 1992

Boys' basketball

- State Champion 1985, 2019

Girls' soccer

- State Champion 1994

Girls' track and field

- State Champion 1993

== Rivalries ==
Rangeview's rival school is Gateway High School, also part of Aurora Public Schools. The rivalry has lasted since the founding of Rangeview, half of whose initial students were taken from Gateway, and spans all sports and competitions. The winner of the annual football game is awarded the Anvil trophy. Rangeview has maintained possession of the Anvil since the last game played in 2018.

== Alumni ==
- Robyn (Maddox) Brody, '88, attorney, chief justice of the Idaho Supreme Court
- India Arie, musician, relocated to Atlanta before graduation
- Davy Armstrong, '10, midfielder for the Colorado Rapids
- Chloe Johnson, '07, television personality, beauty pageant title holder, model, dancer and community leader
- Matt Craphorn, ‘12, soccer player
