= Clyde Rucker =

American entrepreneur and businessman (born 1963)

- Born: May 23, 1963 (age 63); Fort Sill, Oklahoma, U.S.
- Education: Central Michigan University
- Title: Chairman and CEO of Rucker Restaurant Holdings, LLC
- Spouse: Jessica Rucker
- Children: 5

Clyde Rucker (born May 23, 1963) is an American businessman who is Chief Executive Officer (CEO) of Rucker Restaurant Holdings. As of 2026, he owns over 100 Jack in the Box and Denny's restaurants in Arizona, Florida and Texas.

Rucker, was formally a member of the 100 Black Men of America and held a seat on the Board of Trustees of the Florida Memorial University. As of 2016, he holds a seat on the Board of Directors for the Valero Alamo Bowl.

== Early life and education ==
Rucker was born in Fort Sill, Oklahoma in a military family. He is a 1981 Graduate of Gateway High School in Aurora, Colorado and earned a bachelor's degree in ethnic studies from the University of Colorado Boulder in 1984. After serving in the U.S. Army, Rucker graduated in 1990 with a master's degree from Central Michigan University.

== Career ==
After serving in the United States Army, where he achieved the rank of captain in the Inactive Ready Reserve, Rucker joined Ford Motor Company as a zone manager. Later, he accepted a position at KFC, owned by PepsiCo at that time. Rucker then served as a senior executive at Burger King for 12 years. After the company went public in 2007, Rucker joined former Burger King Chairman/CEO Greg Brenneman at Quiznos, as an Executive Vice President, later President of International, and COO. According to Rucker, his years working on the franchisor side allowed him to gradually rise to higher positions in the corporate ladder, helping him to become a well rounded, successful franchisee. “Working for a franchisor was an intermediate goal to gain a lot of learning, as well as to excel in a corporate environment. I enjoyed it tremendously and what it did, both directly and indirectly, was give me the opportunity to understand the true definition of a good franchisee and a good business model.”

In 2010, Rucker saw the right opportunity to become a franchisee for a real blue-chip brand and formed Rucker Restaurant Holdings in Phoenix. As of January 2019, Rucker Restaurant Holdings manages over 80 restaurants in both the Jack in the Box and Denny's brands in Arizona and Texas.
