= Grace Preparatory Academy of Durango =

Location
- United States
- 37°16′33″N 107°52′39″W

Information
- Type: Private school
- Religious affiliation: Christian
- Established: 2001
- Grades: 7-12
- Accreditation: Association of Christian Schools International
- Affiliation: National Association of University-Model Schools

Grace Preparatory Academy of Durango was a private, college-preparatory Christian school located in Durango, Colorado, United States. Founded in 2001, it offered programs for seventh through twelfth grade students. It had been a member of the National Association of University-Model Schools since 2006 and was a member of the Association of Christian Schools International.

== Educational model ==
Grace Preparatory Academy of Durango adhered to the educational model known as the University-Model School® (UMS) which combines two elements of educational success, the professional classroom instruction of a teacher and the at-home mentoring of a parent, into a unified, college-like program. Students attended classes on campus two days per week, and instruction continued at home on the other days.
