= Yoder, Colorado =

Unincorporated community in El Paso County, CO, USA

- Unincorporated community
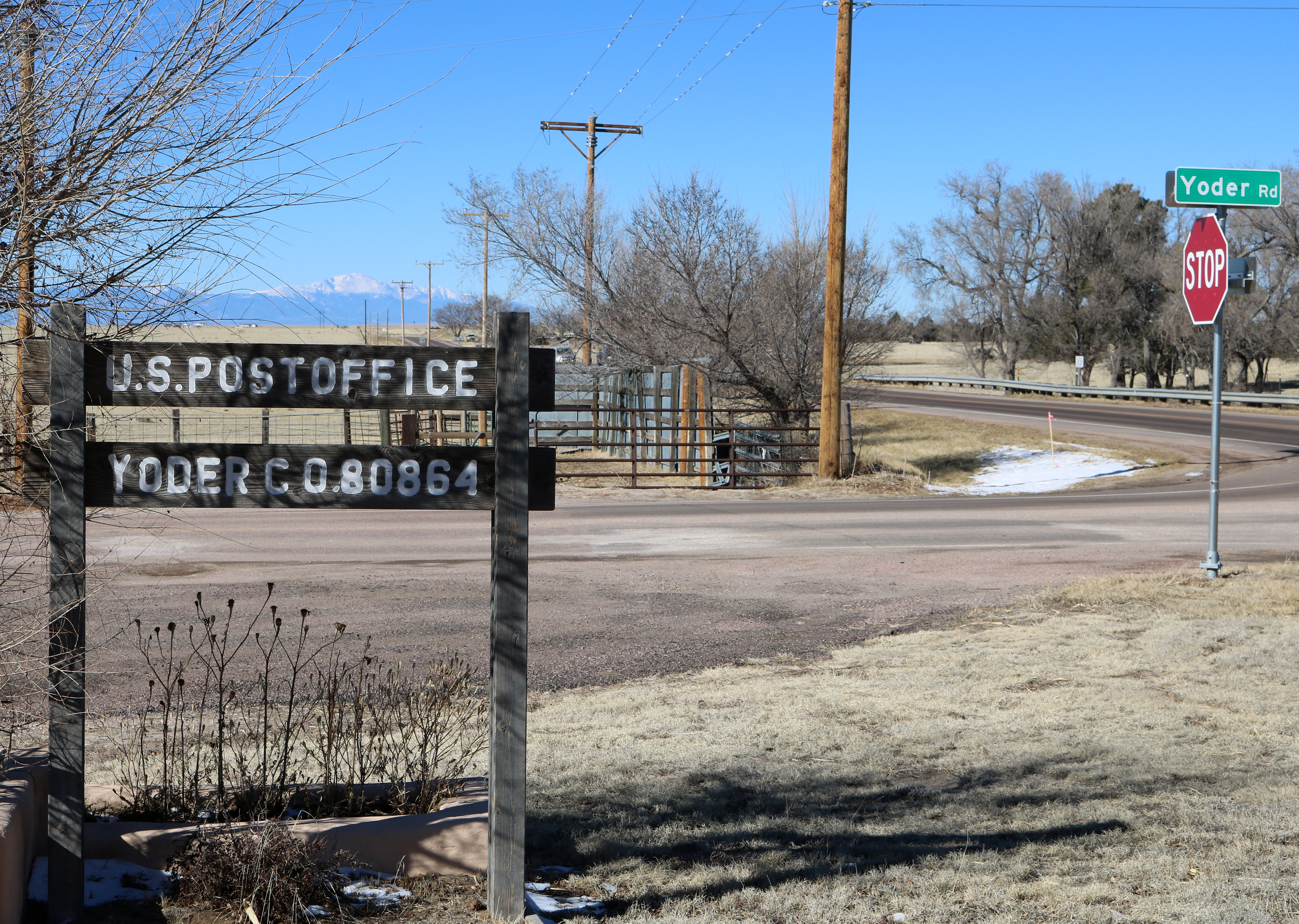
- Yoder, looking west.

- Location within the state of Colorado
- Coordinates: 38°50′22″N 104°13′20″W
- Country: United States
- State: Colorado
- County: El Paso County
- Elevation: 6,145 ft (1,873 m)
- Time zone: UTC-7 (MST)
  - Summer (DST): UTC-6 (MDT)
- ZIP code: 80864
- Area code: 719
- GNIS feature ID: 193568

Yoder is an unincorporated community and a U.S. Post Office located in El Paso County, Colorado, United States. The Yoder Post Office has the ZIP Code 80864.

A post office called Yoder has been in operation since 1904. Ira M. Yoder, an early postmaster, gave the community his name.

Students are served by the Edison Junior-Senior High School of the Edison School District 54JT, as well as by the Miami-Yoder School District 60JT.
