= Aguilar, Colorado =

Statutory town in Las Animas County, Colorado, United States

- Statutory town
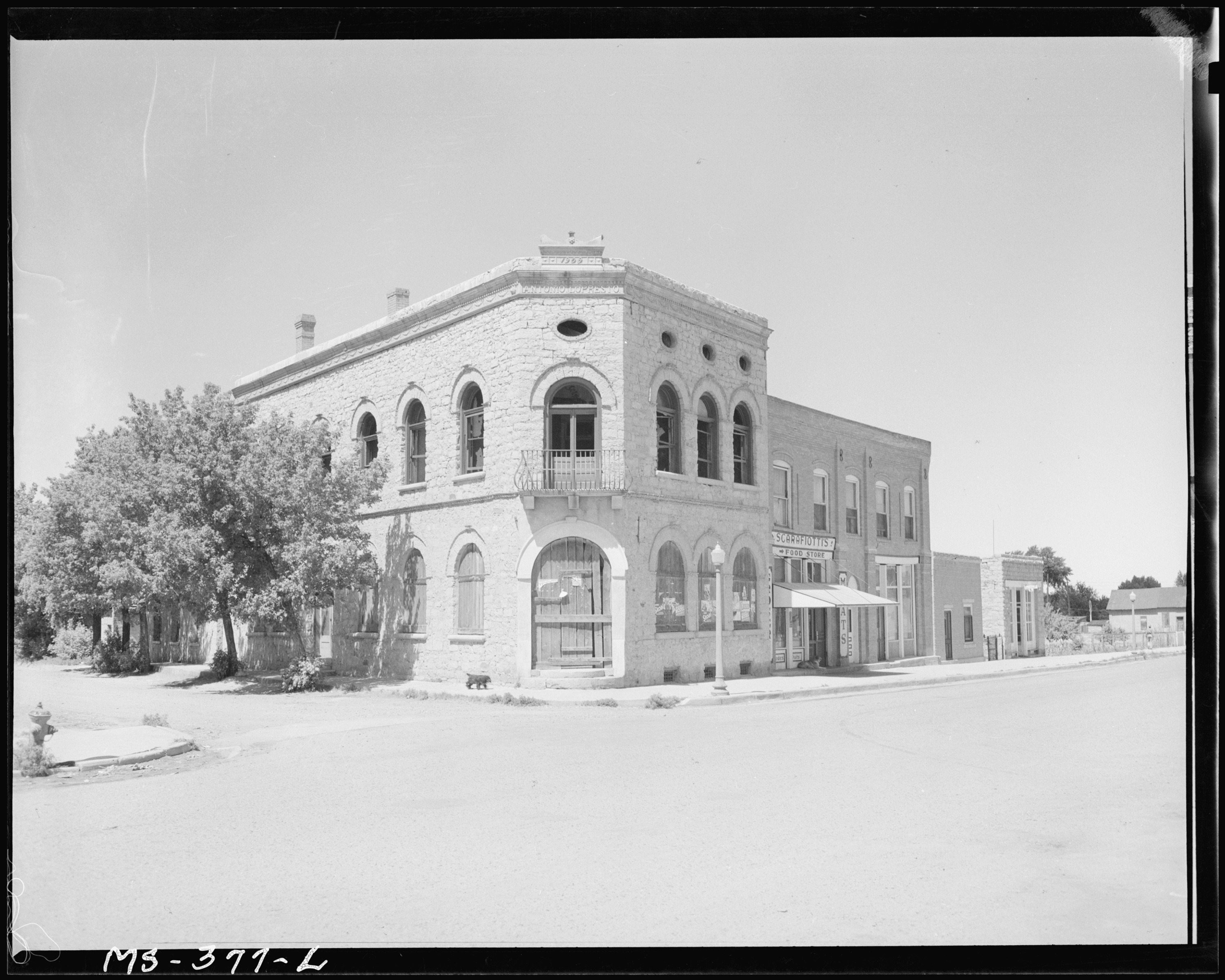
- Old building on main street of Aguilar, 1946.
- Nickname: "Gateway to the Spanish Peaks"
- Location of the Town of Aguilar in Las Animas County, Colorado
- Coordinates: 37°24′13″N 104°39′18″W
- Country: United States
- State: Colorado
- County: Las Animas
- Founded: 1894
- Incorporated (town): January 10, 1894

Government
  - Type: statutory town
  - Mayor: Erlinda Encinias

Area
  - Total: 0.39 sq mi (1.02 km^{2})
  - Land: 0.39 sq mi (1.02 km^{2})
  - Water: 0 sq mi (0.00 km^{2})
- Elevation: 6,388 ft (1,947 m)

Population (2020)
  - Total: 456
  - Density: 1,162.4/sq mi (448.79/km^{2})
- Time zone: UTC−07:00 (MST)
  - Summer (DST): UTC−06:00 (MDT)
- ZIP code: 81020
- Area code: 719
- GNIS town ID: 2412339
- FIPS code: 08-00760
- Website: aguilarco.us

Aguilar is a statutory town located in Las Animas County, Colorado, United States. The town population was 456 at the 2020 United States census. Cattleman and prominent pioneer José Ramón Aguilar founded the town in 1894.

== History ==
In 1864, a trading post called San Antonio Plaza was created by Agapito Ribali (sometimes misspelled as Rivali or Ruballi) at the current site of the town. The San Antonio post office was established in 1875, and at some point the settlement was renamed to Schultz Plaza after William Schultz, builder of the first store in the settlement. In 1879, J. Ramón Aguilar came to the area and bought the land in and around the settlement. The Aguilar, Colorado, post office opened on December 16, 1890, and the Town of Aguilar was incorporated on January 18, 1894, named after the owner of the land.

In 1888, the Peerless coal mine opened close to Aguilar, and in 1892, the Union Pacific, Denver and Gulf Railway built a spur line west from Acme to Aguilar with an additional spur to the mine, which was absorbed by the Colorado and Southern Railway in 1898. An extension of the line was built to Brodhead in 1900 to serve it and other coal mines in the area, such as the Empire, the Gem, and the Green Canyon.

From September 1913 until late April 1914, much of Las Animas County was embroiled by the Colorado Coalfield War, which saw up to 12,000 pro-United Mine Workers of America strikers engaged in both peaceful and violent confrontations with the Rockefeller-owned Colorado Fuel & Iron Company, other mining outfits, strikebreakers, and the Colorado National Guard. On October 29, 1913, the Aguilar post office and several other town structures were destroyed in an arson attack related to the strike. The National Guard arrested several strikers over the attack and handed them over to the federal U.S. Marshal Service.

Following the Ludlow Massacre on April 20, 1914, strikers launched numerous attacks of both coordinated and spontaneous natures against mining operations, strikebreakers, and the National Guard in what is known as the Ten-Day War. One of the attacks was launched against Southwestern Mine Co.'s Empire Mine on April 22, where armed strikers forced non-striking miners and their families into the mine and began an all-night siege outside. After negotiation led by Aguilar's mayor and a church minister named McDonald, the strikers abandoned the siege before fatalities on either side were reported.

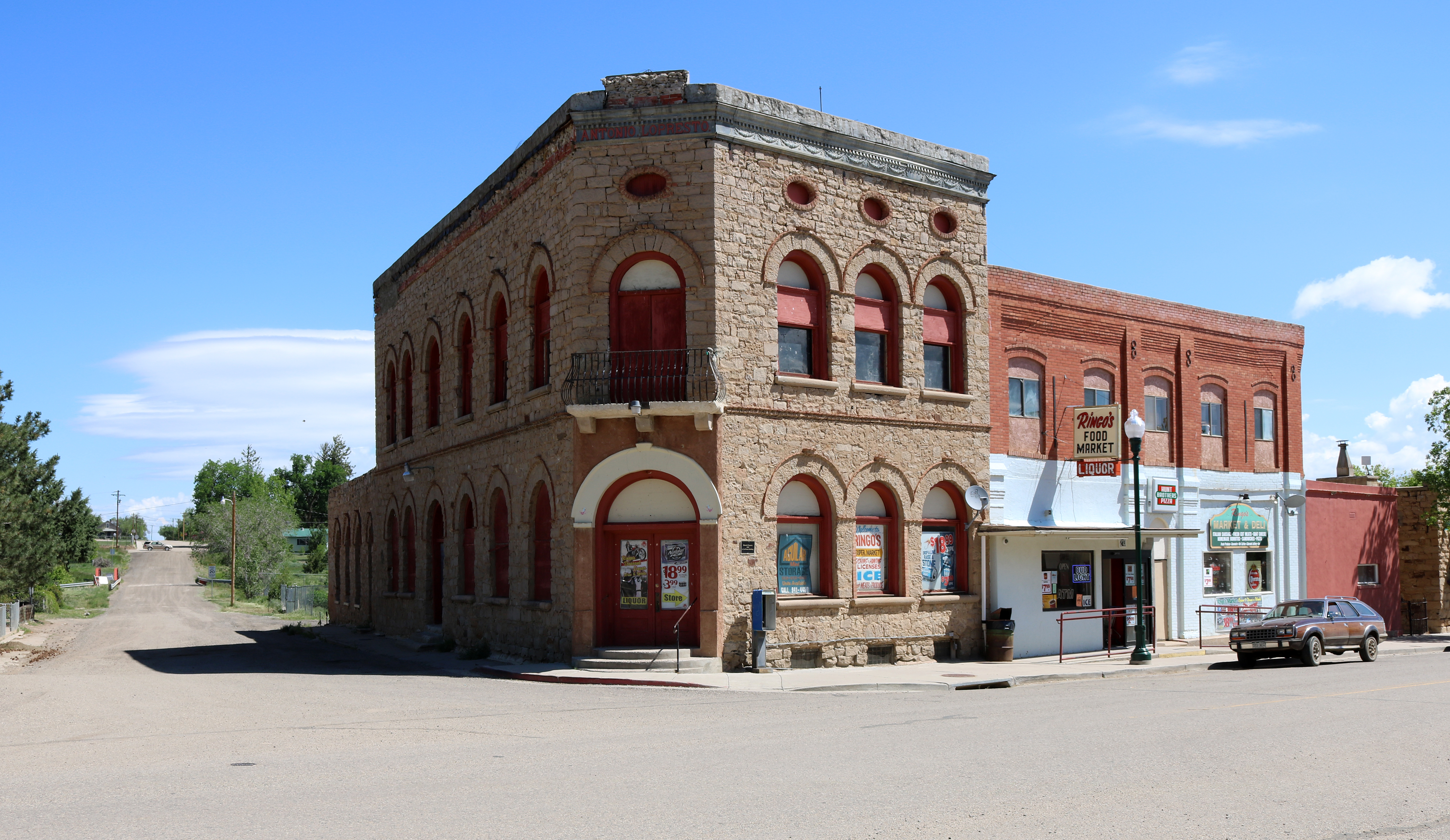
Contemporary Aguilar.

== Geography ==
Aguilar is located in Las Animas County about one mile west of Interstate 25.

At the 2020 United States census, the town had a total area of 251 acres (1.016 km^{2}), all of it land.

=== Climate ===
Climate data for Aguilar
Month	Jan	Feb	Mar	Apr	May	Jun	Jul	Aug	Sep	Oct	Nov	Dec	Year
Mean daily maximum °F (°C)	38.2 (3.4)	43.9 (6.6)	51.7 (10.9)	60.4 (15.8)	70 (21)	81.8 (27.7)	88.7 (31.5)	86.8 (30.4)	78.1 (25.6)	65.6 (18.7)	49.2 (9.6)	40.4 (4.7)	62.9 (17.2)
Mean daily minimum °F (°C)	11.9 (−11.2)	17.1 (−8.3)	23.8 (−4.6)	31.6 (−0.2)	41.7 (5.4)	51 (11)	56.7 (13.7)	55 (13)	45.7 (7.6)	33.5 (0.8)	21.7 (−5.7)	13.7 (−10.2)	33.6 (0.9)
Average precipitation inches (mm)	0.6 (15)	0.7 (18)	1.7 (43)	2.1 (53)	2.6 (66)	1.8 (46)	2.7 (69)	3.1 (79)	1.6 (41)	1 (25)	1 (25)	0.7 (18)	19.6 (500)
Source: Weatherbase

== Demographics ==
Historical population
Census	Pop.	Note	%±
1900	698		—
1910	858		22.9%
1920	1,236		44.1%
1930	1,383		11.9%
1940	1,397		1.0%
1950	1,038		−25.7%
1960	777		−25.1%
1970	699		−10.0%
1980	624		−10.7%
1990	520		−16.7%
2000	593		14.0%
2010	538		−9.3%
2020	456		−15.2%
U.S. Decennial Census

As of the census of 2000, there were 593 people, 243 households, and 165 families residing in the town. The population density was 1,508.8 inhabitants per square mile (582.6/km^{2}). There were 291 housing units at an average density of 740.4 per square mile (285.9/km^{2}). The racial makeup of the town was 86.00% White, 3.04% Native American, 0.34% Asian, 6.91% from other races, and 3.71% from two or more races. Hispanic or Latino of any race were 46.54% of the population.

There were 243 households, out of which 23.5% had children under the age of 18 living with them, 48.1% were married couples living together, 14.4% had a female householder with no husband present, and 31.7% were non-families. 27.2% of all households were made up of individuals, and 16.0% had someone living alone who was 65 years of age or older. The average household size was 2.44 and the average family size was 2.93.

In the town, the population was spread out, with 23.3% under the age of 18, 6.6% from 18 to 24, 20.2% from 25 to 44, 28.5% from 45 to 64, and 21.4% who were 65 years of age or older. The median age was 45 years. For every 100 females, there were 97.7 males. For every 100 females age 18 and over, there were 88.8 males.

The median income for a household in the town was $23,750, and the median income for a family was $30,815. Males had a median income of $22,500 versus $21,250 for females. The per capita income for the town was $11,249. About 27.8% of families and 34.3% of the population were below the poverty line, including 64.0% of those under age 18 and 25.7% of those age 65 or over.

== Education ==
Aguilar Public Schools is part of the Aguilar Reorganized School District RE-6. The school district has one elementary school and one junior/senior high school.

Aguilar Elementary School and Aguilar Junior/Senior High School are located in Aguilar.

== Infrastructure ==
=== Transportation ===
Aguilar is part of Colorado's Bustang network. It is on the Trinidad-Pueblo Outrider line.

== See also ==
- Spanish Peaks
