= Colorado's Finest High School of Choice =

Location
- 300 West Chenango Avenue; Englewood, Colorado 80110; United States; 39°37′38″N 104°59′31″W

Information
- Former name: Colorado's Finest Alternative High School
- Type: Public alternative high school
- Motto: Choose Your Finest Future
- Established: 1980; 46 years ago
- School district: Englewood 1
- CEEB code: 060516
- NCES School ID: 080378001310
- Principal: Cindy Chick
- Teaching staff: 17.37 (on an FTE basis)
- Grades: 9–12
- Gender: Coeducational
- Enrollment: 223 (2023–24)
- Student to teacher ratio: 12.84
- Campus type: Suburban, Large
- Colors: Black and purple
- Website: cfhsc.englewoodschools.net

Colorado's Finest High School of Choice is an alternative public high school in Englewood, Colorado, United States, a suburb of Denver.

CFAHS serves students who prefer to attend an alternative program with a flexible start and end time. Graduates receive a certified high school diploma by completing 23 credit hours.

In 2014, the school changed its name from Colorado's Finest Alternative High School to Colorado's Finest High School of Choice The school also moved into a new facility at that time.

== School hours ==
The program runs from 7:55 AM to 4:00 PM. There is a single 30-minute break for lunch around noon; it is a closed campus but students are allowed to obtain lunch either on campus or by ordering in (only during their lunch break).

== Accreditation ==
The school is accredited by the North Central Association of Secondary Schools, the Colorado Department of Education, and holds membership in the College Board, the National Alliance of High Schools, and the National Association of College Admissions Counseling.

== History ==
The previous name of the school was created by the first group of students who stated they attended the "Finest" alternative high school in Colorado. Several times throughout the years the students have been asked how they feel about changing the name and they have always voted to remain Colorado's Finest Alternative High School.

== Awards ==
In December 1991, the Colorado School Board of Education recognized CFAHS as a Commissioner's Challenger School. It was one of three high schools to receive this honor.

In 1992, the Colorado State Board of Education recognized CFAHS as a School of Excellence. The school has been recognized as a School of Excellence for six consecutive years, and is the only high school in Colorado to achieve this.

The Colorado State Board of Education and the Colorado Association of Commerce and Industry jointly award the John J. Erwin Colorado School of Excellence each spring to schools that maintain their high academic standards. CFAHS is the only high school to receive this award for five consecutive years.

In 2005, CFAHS received the El Pomar Foundation for "Outstanding High School of the Year."
