= Englewood Schools =

School district in Englewood, Colorado

Address
- 4101 South Bannock Street Englewood, Colorado, 80110; United States
- Coordinates: 39°38′29″N 104°59′26″W

District information
- Motto: Building a New Tradition of Excellence
- Grades: P–12
- Superintendent: Joanna Polzin
- Asst. superintendent(s): Michelle Haider
- Schools: 9
- NCES District ID: 0803780

Students and staff
- Students: 2,440
- Teachers: 182.05 (on an FTE basis)
- Staff: 213.28 (on an FTE basis)
- Student–teacher ratio: 13.40

Other information
- Website: www.englewoodschools.net

Englewood Schools is a school district located in Englewood, Colorado, United States, in the Greater Denver area.

The district includes the majority of Englewood and sections of Cherry Hills Village and Littleton.

== Schools ==
High schools

- Englewood High School
- Colorado's Finest High School of Choice (CFHSC) - The school formerly used the name Colorado's Finest Alternative High School, a name chosen by a group of students. On December 9, 1991 the school was named a Colorado School of Excellence.

Middle schools

- Englewood Middle School

Elementary schools

- Bishop Elementary School
- Cherrelyn Elementary School
- Clayton Elementary School
- Charles Hay World Elementary School

Pre-K

- Englewood Schools Early Childhood Education (ECE) Program at Maddox
