= Wigwam, Colorado =

Unincorporated community in El Paso County, CO, USA

- unincorporated community
- Location within Colorado
- Coordinates: 38°32′22″N 104°38′08″W
- Country: United States
- State: Colorado
- County: El Paso
- Elevation: 5,223 ft (1,592 m)
- Time zone: Mountain
- ZIP Code: 81008
- GNIS feature ID: 193656

Wigwam is an unincorporated community located in El Paso County, Colorado. It is located south of Fountain near the border of El Paso County.
