= Humanex Academy =

Location
- 2700 S. Zuni St. Englewood, Colorado 80110; United States; 39°40′03″N 105°00′55″W

Information
- School type: Private alternative school
- Established: 1983 (43 years ago)
- CEEB code: 060887
- Director: Kati Cahill
- Grades: 6–12
- Enrollment: 56
- Campus type: Suburban
- Mascot: Explorers
- Affiliations: CHADD, North Central Association of Colleges and Schools, Colorado Psychological Association
- Website: www.humanexacademy.com

Humanex Academy is an accredited, private, non-profit middle and high school in Englewood, Colorado, United States, for neurodivergent students, including those with Autism, Anxiety, learning disabilities, and ADHD. The small, supportive, and individualized environment provided at Humanex enables students to be themselves and find success through built-in accommodations, differentiated curriculum, and embedded social coaching.

Serving students in grades 6–12, Humanex Academy typically has around 40 students total.

== History ==
Humanex Academy was founded in 1983 by Cheryl Okizaki as an alternative school working with at-risk youth. In 1996, Humanex moved to its present location in Denver, Colorado.

== Directors ==
- Cheryl Okizaki (1983–2004)
- Brian Smith (2004–2005)
- Tracy Wagers (2005–2012)
- Daniel R. Toomey (2012–2018)
- Kati Cahill (2018–Present)
