= National Association of University-Model Schools =

Association of schools

The National Association of University-Model Schools (NAUMS, Inc.) was founded in 2002 to promote University-Model schooling in the United States and to assist existing and developing University-Model Schools.

A University-Model school is a Christian, college-preparatory school which blends aspects of private and homeschooling. Students meet on campus two or three days per week, and complete lessons at home on alternate days under the direction of professional teachers, with parents serving as co-teachers.

The "University Model" name is derived from the university-style scheduling offered by member schools. Students typically register for course on a semester-by-semester basis and may register for a full load or just selected courses.

NAUMS member schools must pursue accreditation as a condition of their membership, and current NAUMS member schools have been accredited by one or more of the following organizations: The Commission on International Trans-Regional Accreditation, the Georgia Accrediting Commission, the Western Association of Schools and Colleges, the Southern Association of Colleges and Schools, Council on Accreditation and School Improvement, and the North Central Association Commission on Accreditation and School Improvement.

As of 2019, there were 88 operating member schools in 19 states, with a total student population of 11,626 students and one international school.

Current University-Model Schools serve students from kindergarten to 12th grade, with some schools offering a more limited range of grades.

Tuition at a university model school is typically 40% to 75% less than a traditional five-days-per-week school, resulting from fewer days on campus and a higher level of parental involvement.
