= Aguilar School District RE-6 =

School district in Colorado, United States

Aguilar Reorganized School District RE-6
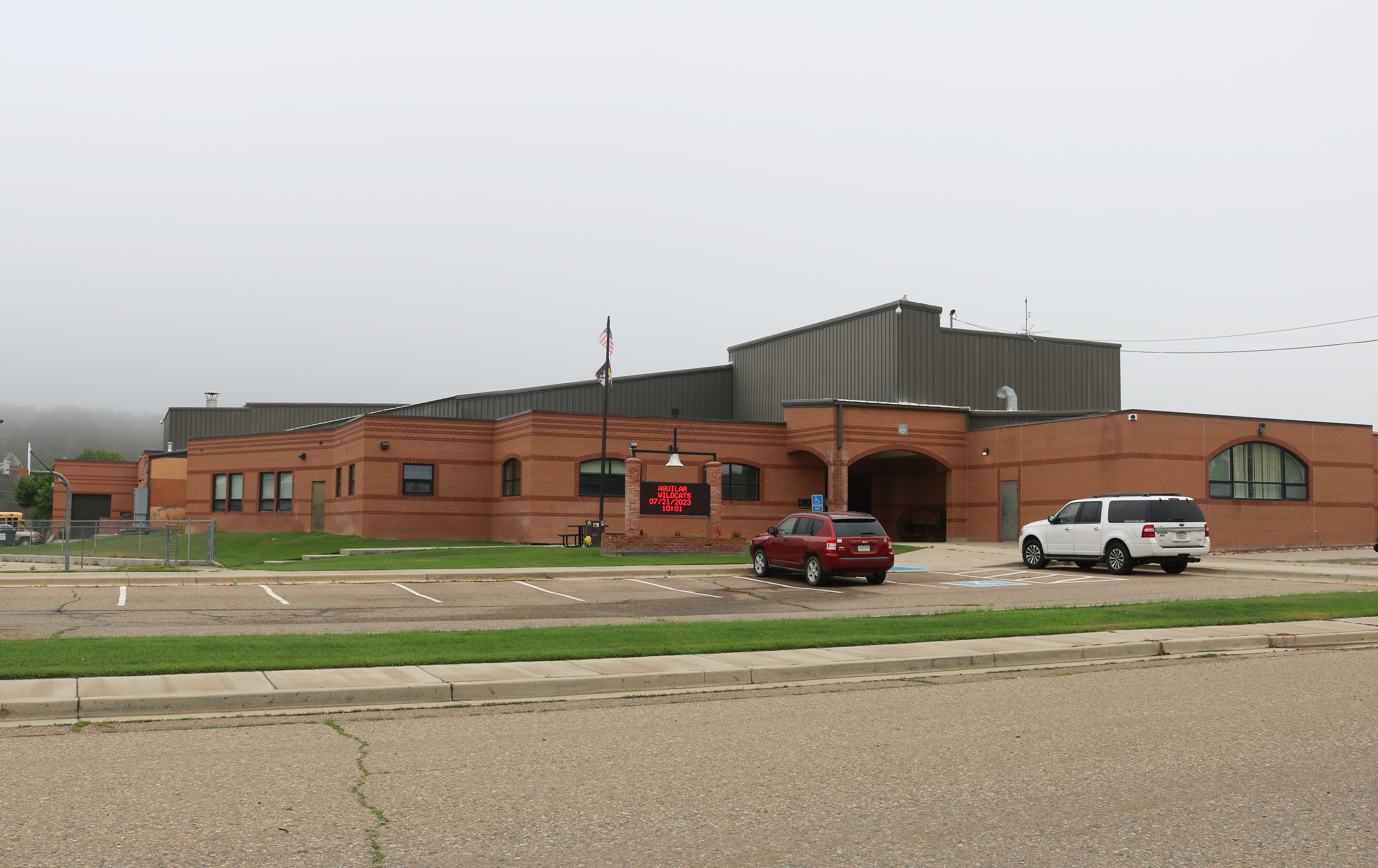
- The main school building in 2023

Address
- 420 North Balsam Aguilar, Colorado, 81020; United States

District information
- Grades: Pre-Kindergarten - 12
- NCES District ID: 0802010

Students and staff
- Enrollment: 80
- Student–teacher ratio: 12.68

Other information
- Website: www.aguilarschools.com

Aguilar Reorganized School District RE-6 is a public school district in Las Animas County, Colorado, United States, based in Aguilar, Colorado.

== Schools ==
The Aguilar Reorganized School District RE-6 has one elementary school and one junior/senior high school.

=== Elementary schools ===
- Aguilar Elementary School

=== Junior/senior high schools ===
- Aguilar Junior/Senior High School
