= Edison School =

Public school and district in Colorado, United States

Location
- 14550 Edison Road; Yoder, Colorado 80864; United States
- Coordinates: 38°37′11″N 104°9′55″W

Information
- School type: Public school
- Motto: Achieving Excellence
- School district: Edison 54JT
- NCES District ID: 0803630
- Superintendent: Dave Eastin
- CEEB code: 061495; 060108
- NCES School ID: 080363000478; 080363001278; 080363006648
- Principal: Dave Eastin
- Teaching staff: 8.51 (on an FTE basis)
- Grades: P–12
- Gender: Coeducational
- Enrollment: 46 (2023–24)
- Student to teacher ratio: 5.41
- Campus type: Rural, Remote
- Colors: Green and white
- Athletics conference: Arkansas Valley
- Mascot: Eagle
- Website: edison54jt.org

Edison School is a public school in rural El Paso County, Colorado, near the unincorporated community of Truckton. It is the only school in Edison School District 54JT, which serves southeastern El Paso County as well as portions of northeast Pueblo County and southwest Lincoln County. It enrolls students in Pre-K through twelfth grade and, in addition to its normal high school program, offers an alternative called Edison Prep.
