= New Meridian High School =

Location
- 1200 South Sunset Street; Longmont, Colorado 80501; United States
- Coordinates: 40°8′46″N 105°7′14″W

Information
- Former name: Olde Columbine High School
- Type: Public alternative high school
- School district: St. Vrain Valley RE-1J
- CEEB code: 060936
- NCES School ID: 080537001374
- Principal: ToniJo Niccoli
- Teaching staff: 10.00 (on an FTE basis)
- Grades: 9–12
- Gender: Coeducational
- Enrollment: 95 (2024–25)
- Student to teacher ratio: 9.50
- Campus type: Suburban, Midsize
- Mascot: Eagle
- Website: nmhs.svvsd.org

New Meridian High School is an alternative high school in Longmont, Colorado. It is part of St. Vrain Valley Schools.

The school is relatively small, enrolling 95 students in the 2024–25 school year. The school changed its name from Olde Columbine High School in 2021.
