= Chávez Huerta Preparatory Academy =

Location
- 2727 W 18th Street; Pueblo, Colorado 81003; United States
- Coordinates: 38°17′4″N 104°39′3″W

Information
- Type: Charter School High School
- Motto: Building a Legacy of Success, Si Se Puede
- Established: 2000
- Closed: June 2025; 10 months ago
- School district: Pueblo School District 60
- CEEB code: 061192
- President/CEO: Fred Segura
- Faculty: 50.46 (FTE)
- Grades: K-12
- Enrollment: 917 (2018-19)
- Student to teacher ratio: 18.17
- Campus type: Rural
- Colors: Blue and gold
- Athletics conference: 3A - Tri-Peaks East League
- Mascot: Scorpion
- Feeder schools: Cesar Chavez Academy
- Website: www.chpa-k12.org
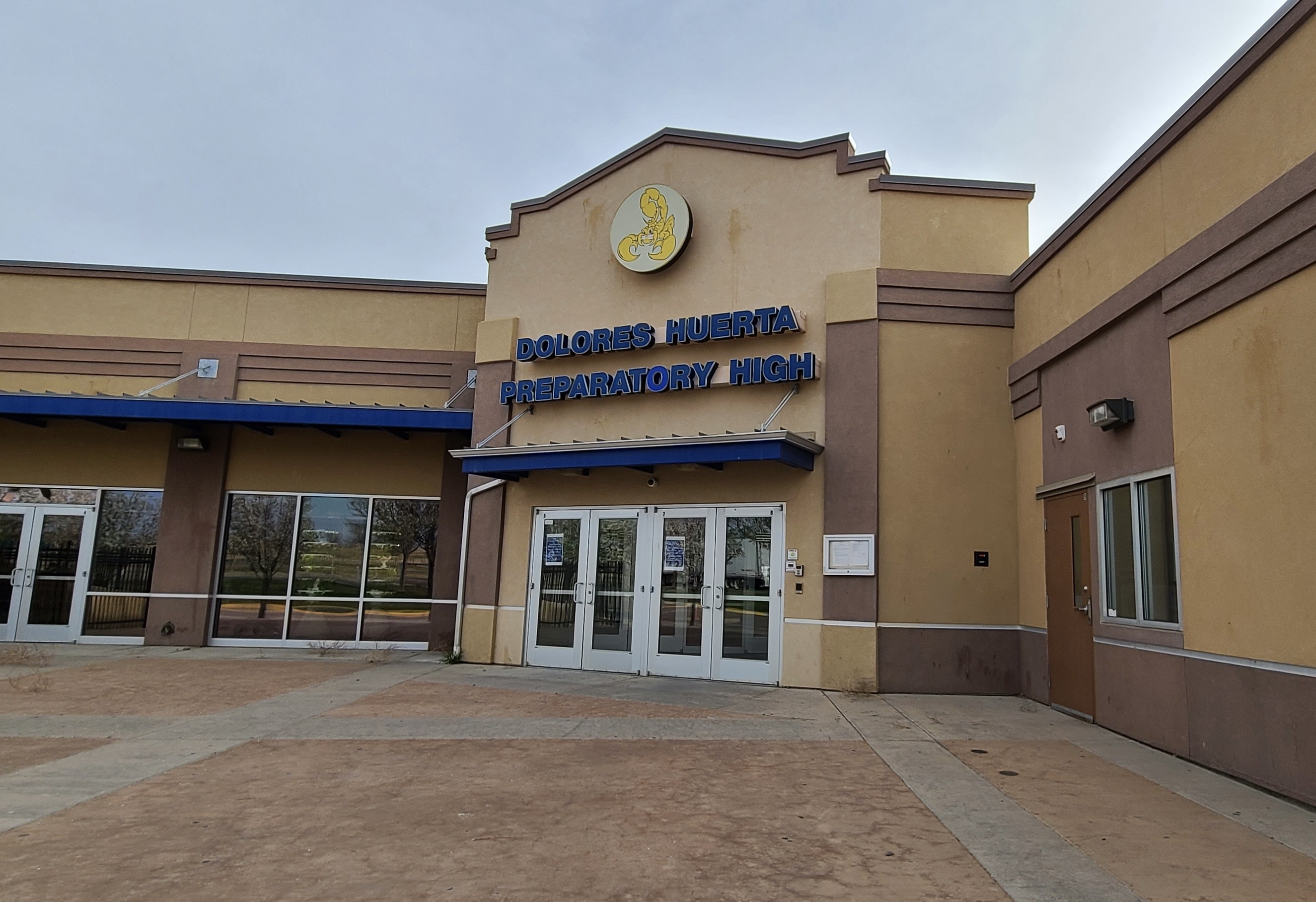
- Dolores Huerta Preparatory High School

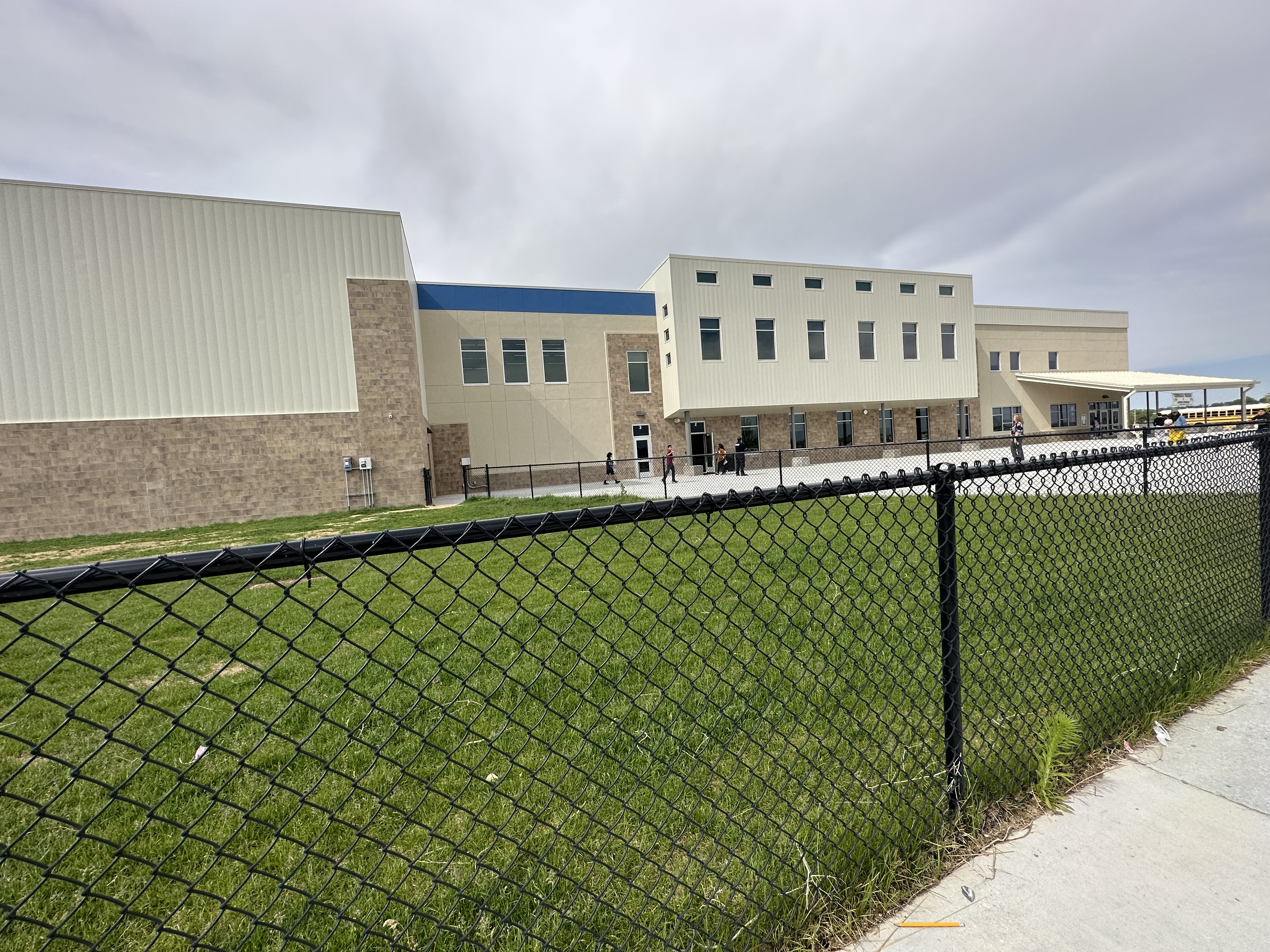
- Ersilia Cruz Middle School

Chávez Huerta Preparatory Academy was a charter school system in Pueblo, Colorado. It was divided into three campuses: César Chávez Academy (CCA), the elementary school; Ersilia Cruz Middle School (ECMS), the middle school; and Dolores Huerta Preparatory High School (DHPH), which was the only charter high school in Pueblo. It remained open for 25 years until closing in June 2025.

== History ==
In November 2000, Pueblo D60 (then known as Pueblo City Schools) approved the charter contract for César Chávez Academy. CCA began enrolling students in 2001. It operated out of the vacant Hyde Park Elementary building which was built in 1948 on the West Side neighborhood of Pueblo. 2002 saw the formation of the school's Mariachi Aguila, a school mariachi band. In 2003, the facility was expanded to accommodate a gymnasium and science classes.

By 2004, the district had also approved Dolores Huerta Preparatory High School's charter and it opened for the 2004-2005 school year. Eventually in November 2006, construction began on a new building for the high school, and a ribbon cutting ceremony was held in September 2007, with the labor leader Dolores Huerta attending. Later, the Mariachi Aguilla placed third in the Mariachi Spectacular, an international event hosted in Albuquerque.

In 2012, the district approved a consolidated charter, merging together the administrations into one charter school.

In May 2016, an individual in the area was spotted by a school staff member and seemed to have had a gun. This led to a lockdown of the schools and closure of the streets around the schools until officers determined it was safe.

On February 4, 2021, it was announced that a new transitional school would be built north of Dolores Huerta Preparatory High School to temporarily house Ersilia Cruz Middle School. It was also announced that an extension to the high school and a new building for the middle school would be built The transitional school building opened on August 12, 2022.

In March 2022, members of the nearby community and staff called for the resignation of President Hal Stevens and Vice President Stephen Valera, due to a basketball event being canceled and postponed by a Pueblo County Republican Party convention. Teachers from the schools hosted a walk-out, which was criticized by the board members. Later in August, teachers yet again requested that Hal Stevens and Stephen Valera step down from the position due to many layoffs and a hostile work environment.

In September 2022, Hal Stevens resigned and Richard Duran was appointed to be interim CEO, and Stephen Valera also resigned in November of the same year.

In August 2024, the new renovations and additions to the original high school building held a ribbon cutting ceremony to celebrate opening.

=== Closure ===
In January 2025, Pueblo School District 60 school board members voted unanimously to cut off the partnership between the district and CHPA. The district had concerns about academic performance, the finances of the academy, and the turnover rate of staff. On April 8, over 100 students took a field trip to the D60 administration building to protest, saying to release the school from the charter agreement. In the past, the school had wished to expand services to online school and elementary school dual immersion, with the district declining. This influenced the school's wish to end the charter agreement. An appeal was made to the Colorado Department of Education to stay open outside of D60. CHPA stood before the department on May 15. However, the department sided with D60 with a 7-1 vote. This left the charter school's future unclear.

After 25 years in operation, the charter school officially closed in June 2025.

=== Legacy ===
The building that used to hold ECMS is planned to be reopened in August 2026 as Hyde Park Collegiate Middle School by District 60 to serve Pueblo's west side.

== Athletics ==
The school's colors were blue and gold. The school's mascot was the scorpion which originated from a school-wide competition in 2004. The schools athletics used the slogan "Scorpion Strong". The Scorpions field teams competed in the 3A Tri-Peaks East League in the Colorado High School Athletics Association (CHSAA).

== Mariachi Aguila ==
The Chávez Huerta Preparatory Academy hosted a mariachi band program, called the Mariachi Aguila, made up of eleven student mariachi musicians. Mariachi Aguila was started at Cesar Chávez Academy shortly after its founding in 2001, and has traveled nationally and internationally, performing at folk music programs.
