= Tara Performing Arts High School =

Private high school in Colorado, US

Location
- 4180 19th St. Boulder, Colorado 80304; United States; 40°03′01″N 105°16′20″W

Information
- Type: Private school (Waldorf)
- Motto: A high school like no other.
- Established: 1994 (32 years ago)
- CEEB code: 060131
- Administrator: Betsy Barricklow
- Grades: 9-12
- Enrollment: 45 students (2024-25)
- Campus size: 2-acre (8,100 m^{2})
- Colors: Tan and green
- Mascot: Gnome (unofficial)
- Accreditations: AWSNA
- Tuition: $28,850 (2024-25)
- Website: www.tarahighschool.org

Tara Performing Arts High School is a performing arts focused Waldorf high school in North Boulder, Colorado. It is one of the few, if not the only performing arts focused Waldorf high schools in the United States, if not the world.

== History ==
Tara Performing Arts High School was founded on March 17, 1994. It began as an after-school program for middle schoolers, and developed into a high school in 1997. It graduated its first class in 2001.
