= Denver Online =

Location
- 451 South Tejon Street; Denver, Colorado 80223; United States
- 39°42′32″N 105°00′41″W

Information
- Former name: Denver Online High School
- Type: Online school
- Established: 2003 (23 years ago)
- School district: Denver Public Schools
- CEEB code: 060376
- NCES School ID: 080336001955
- Principal: Ian Jones
- Teaching staff: 35.01 (on an FTE basis)
- Grades: 6–12
- Enrollment: 611 (2023–24)
- Student to teacher ratio: 17.45
- Campus type: Virtual
- Website: online.dpsk12.org

Denver Online, formerly Denver Online High School, is an online school that is run by Denver Public Schools. It uses the Schoology curriculum. Forty percent of the enrolled students are gifted.

First opened in 2003, it enrolls students full time, and provides supplementary classes for students enrolled at other high schools and online classes for homeschooled families.

== History ==
In 2003, the first Denver Public Schools (DPS) Online High School class had six students, a principal (Jeanne Ross) and no teachers - classes were provided by Colorado Online Learning, another online school that Ross had helped start. The main office was located at CEC with the already established Distance Learning Department.

In 2004, with thirteen students, four part-time teachers were hired to develop and teach online courses. In 2005, there were four teachers, all full time, and forty-six students. In 2006, the offices moved to the old Baker school, now DCIS, and opened a satellite site at Manual High School. The first graduating class consisted of fourteen students out of 135 enrolled students in 2007.

In 2008, thirty students graduated out of over 200 students who were enrolled. In 2009 the school offices moved to Mitchell Elementary School and a satellite site was opened at Hamilton Middle School.

In 2009, thirty-two students graduated with the assistance of Denver Online High School, including six who were also enrolled at other schools and 25 who graduated directly from the school.

In 2021, the school expanded to serve students in the sixth, seventh, and eighth grades.

== Campus ==
Despite being a virtual school, it shares a campus with Denver Montessori School.
