= Englewood, Colorado =

Home rule city in Arapahoe County, Colorado, United States

- Home rule city
- City of Englewood
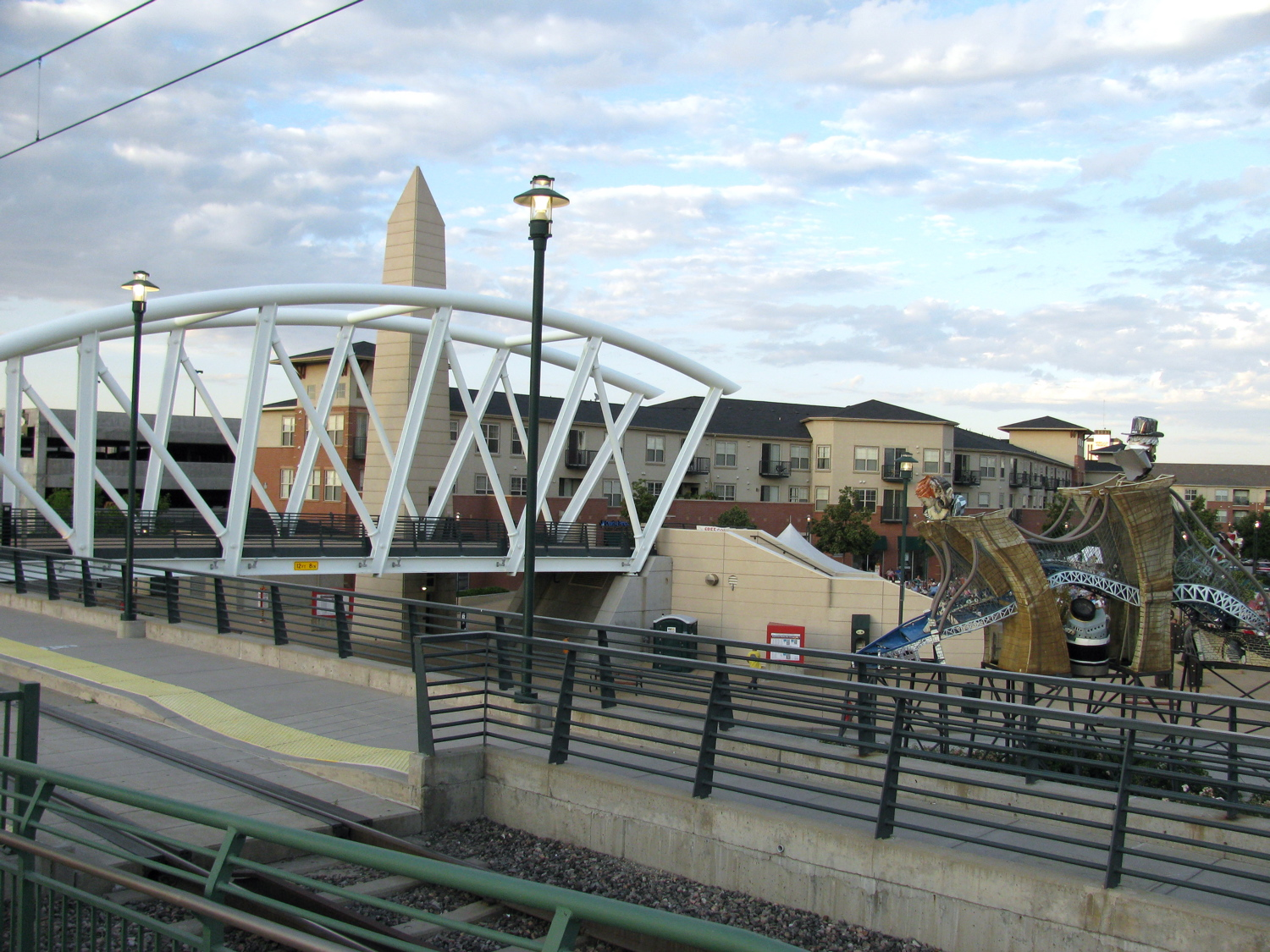
- CityCenter Englewood.

- Location of the City of Englewood in Arapahoe County, Colorado
- Coordinates: 39°37′54″N 105°00′13″W
- Country: United States
- State: Colorado
- County: Arapahoe
- Founded: 1860, as Orchard Place
- Incorporated: May 9, 1903

Government
  - Type: home rule city
  - Mayor: Othoniel Sierra

Area
  - Total: 6.652 sq mi (17.229 km^{2})
  - Land: 6.565 sq mi (17.002 km^{2})
  - Water: 0.088 sq mi (0.227 km^{2})
- Elevation: 5,348 ft (1,630 m)

Population (2020)
  - Total: 33,659
  - Density: 5,127/sq mi (1,980/km^{2})
- Time zone: UTC−07:00 (MST)
  - Summer (DST): UTC−06:00 (MDT)
- ZIP codes: 80110, 80113; PO Boxes 80150-80151, 80155
- Area codes: 303/720/983
- GNIS town ID: 2410441
- FIPS code: 08-24785
- Website: City of Englewood
- Origin of the Pike's Peak Gold Rush

The City of Englewood is a home rule city located in western Arapahoe County, Colorado, United States. The town population was 33,659 at the 2020 United States census. Englewood is a part of the Denver–Aurora–Centennial, CO Metropolitan Statistical Area and the Front Range Urban Corridor. Englewood is located immediately south of Denver in the South Platte River Valley.

== History ==
The recorded history of Englewood began in 1858, when gold was discovered near the mouth of a creek (later named Little Dry Creek) by William Green Russell, a prospector from the State of Georgia. Two years later, Thomas Skerritt, considered to be the founder of the city, established a home in the area, which was called Orchard Place. Four years later, the first road connecting Denver and Orchard Place was built by Skerritt. In 1879, the first telephone arrived in the area. In 1883, the Cherrelyn horsecar path was laid. The Cherrelyn trolley became an important city icon, being carried up Broadway by horse, and down by gravity.

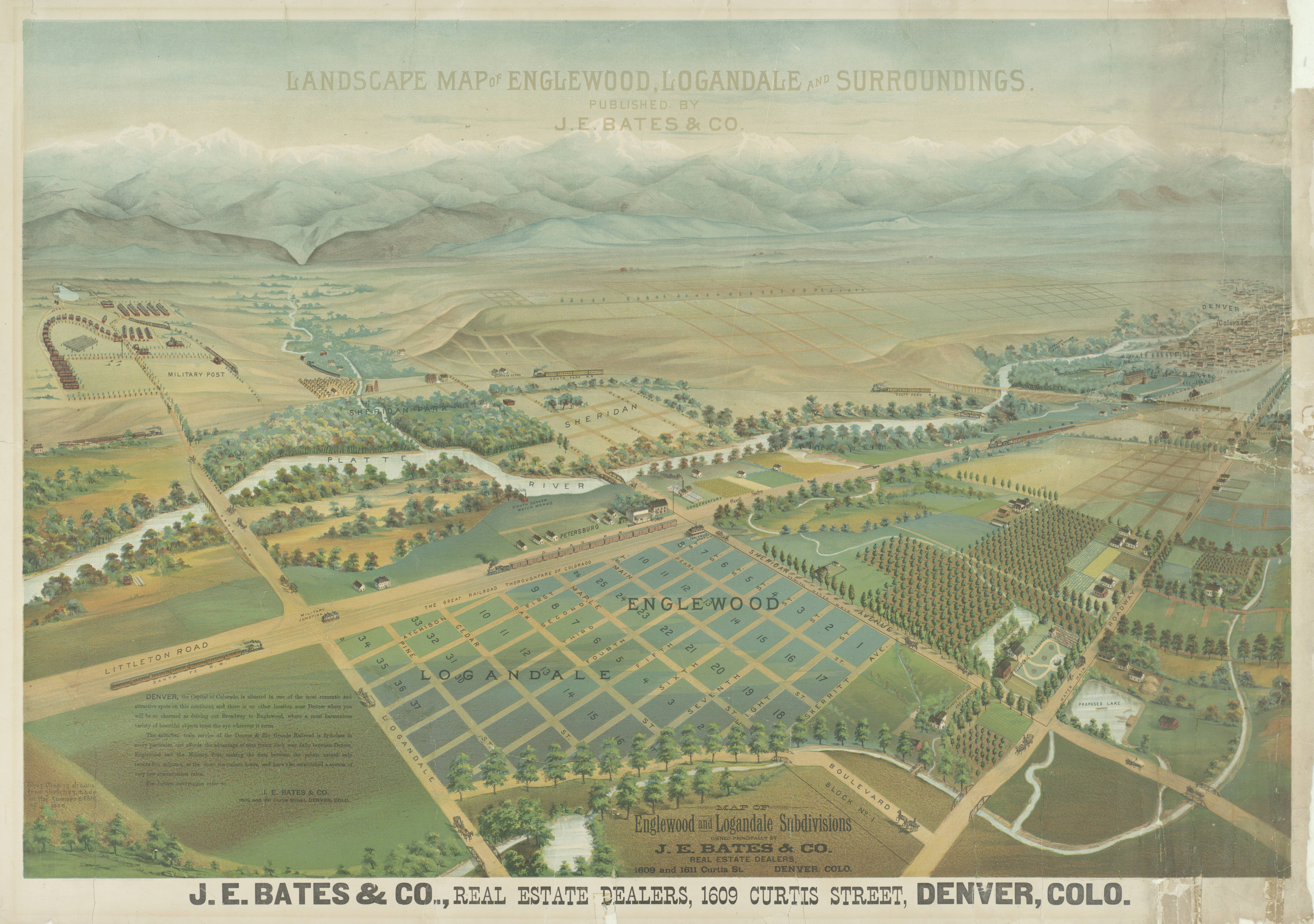
Landscape map of Englewood, Logandale and surroundings.

The Town of Englewood was incorporated on May 9, 1903, and Skerritt edged out by J.C. Jones to become the first mayor. Jones was a prominent landowner, having originally owned almost all of what is now north Englewood. The Englewood, Colorado, post office opened on Oct 24, 1903. The next two years brought the establishment of the first newspaper in the city, soon to be named the Herald. In 1905, Swedish National Sanitorium was founded, soon to become the massive present-day Swedish Medical Center. The first pavement and street lights were installed in 1906 and, a year later, the police and fire departments were established. In 1908, the Cherrelyn horse trolley ceased operating.

A great period of change for the city occurred in 1948; 2,500 acres (1,000 ha) on the Platte Canyon were purchased, and soon McLellan Reservoir was created. This ensured water independence from the powerful Denver Water, and in fact, Englewood provides water to most of the south metro area now due to its vast, early established water rights. Soon after, the city embarked on a huge building boom; most of the city was in fact built up by 1960.

In 1965, City Park was sold to make way for Cinderella City, the largest mall west of the Mississippi River and one of the largest in the world when it opened in 1968. The developer provided the funds to create a vast city park network to replace the single City Park on which the mall was built. About 30 years later, the city demolished the defunct mall to make way for a new, transit-oriented development that would also contain a new Civic Center, library, and the relocated city hall. The Denver Metro Area's transit agency, Regional Transportation District completed its southwest light-rail corridor in 2000, and established passenger rail transit in Englewood. This line, now known as the D Line stops at Englewood station within city limits. The D line runs from Littleton–Mineral station to 18th & California station in the Central Business part of Denver.

Pirates Cove

In 2004, Englewood opened the Pirates Cove water park as part of a multimillion-dollar improvement package for the city parks system. In addition to Pirates Cove, many improvements were made to the South Platte River trail system and the Englewood Recreation Center, originally constructed in 1975.

Englewood is a full-service city with its own, independent park, library, and public works systems. It also provides snowplow service to neighboring municipalities.

== Geography ==
Englewood is located in western Arapahoe County.

At the 2020 United States census, the town had a total area of 4,257 acres (17.229 km^{2}) including 56 acres (0.227 km^{2}) of water.

=== Climate ===
Englewood features a climate very similar to that of Denver, but is slightly milder and more stable due to the city's location in a very low part of the South Platte River valley. Winds are very sparse throughout the city. The Köppen climate classification labels Englewood as having a cold, semiarid climate, BSk on climate maps.

Climate data for Englewood, Colorado
Month	Jan	Feb	Mar	Apr	May	Jun	Jul	Aug	Sep	Oct	Nov	Dec	Year
Record high °F (°C)	72 (22)	75 (24)	87 (31)	89 (32)	94 (34)	105 (41)	108 (42)	104 (40)	100 (38)	96 (36)	81 (27)	76 (24)	108 (42)
Mean daily maximum °F (°C)	43 (6)	46 (8)	53 (12)	61 (16)	70 (21)	81 (27)	87 (31)	84 (29)	76 (24)	64 (18)	51 (11)	43 (6)	63 (17)
Mean daily minimum °F (°C)	19 (−7)	22 (−6)	28 (−2)	36 (2)	45 (7)	53 (12)	59 (15)	57 (14)	48 (9)	37 (3)	26 (−3)	19 (−7)	37 (3)
Record low °F (°C)	−32 (−36)	−33 (−36)	−25 (−32)	−7 (−22)	13 (−11)	27 (−3)	36 (2)	32 (0)	15 (−9)	−8 (−22)	−21 (−29)	−32 (−36)	−33 (−36)
Average precipitation inches (mm)	0.39 (9.9)	0.40 (10)	0.94 (24)	1.24 (31)	1.17 (30)	1.13 (29)	1.52 (39)	1.35 (34)	0.72 (18)	0.59 (15)	0.54 (14)	0.42 (11)	10.42 (265)
Source: MSN Weather

== Demographics ==
Historical population
Census	Pop.	Note	%±
1910	2,983		—
1920	4,356		46.0%
1930	7,980		83.2%
1940	9,680		21.3%
1950	16,869		74.3%
1960	33,398		98.0%
1970	33,695		0.9%
1980	30,021		−10.9%
1990	29,387		−2.1%
2000	31,727		8.0%
2010	30,255		−4.6%
2020	33,659		11.3%
2024 (est.)	35,238	▲	4.7%
U.S. Decennial Census

=== 2020 census ===
As of the 2020 census, Englewood had a population of 33,659. The median age was 36.2 years. 15.7% of residents were under the age of 18 and 14.2% of residents were 65 years of age or older. For every 100 females there were 103.6 males, and for every 100 females age 18 and over there were 103.5 males age 18 and over.

100.0% of residents lived in urban areas, while 0.0% lived in rural areas.

There were 15,950 households in Englewood, of which 19.4% had children under the age of 18 living in them. Of all households, 31.8% were married-couple households, 28.8% were households with a male householder and no spouse or partner present, and 29.0% were households with a female householder and no spouse or partner present. About 38.8% of all households were made up of individuals and 11.4% had someone living alone who was 65 years of age or older.

There were 17,045 housing units, of which 6.4% were vacant. The homeowner vacancy rate was 1.3% and the rental vacancy rate was 7.2%.

Racial composition as of the 2020 census
Race	Number	Percent
White	25,115	74.6%
Black or African American	923	2.7%
American Indian and Alaska Native	470	1.4%
Asian	830	2.5%
Native Hawaiian and Other Pacific Islander	45	0.1%
Some other race	2,356	7.0%
Two or more races	3,920	11.6%
Hispanic or Latino (of any race)	6,418	19.1%

=== 2000 census ===
As of the census of 2000, 31,727 people, 14,392 households, and 7,469 families were residing in the city. The population density was 4,843.8 people/mi^{2} (1,870.2 people/km^{2}). The 14,916 housing units averagedf 2,276.4 per square mile (878.9/km^{2}). The racial makeup of the city was 87.8% White, 1.5% African American, 1.3% Native American, 1.9% Asian, and 2.6% from two or more races. Hispanics or Latinos of any race were 13% of the population.

Of the 14,392 households, 23.6% had children under the age of 18 living with them, 36.7% were married couples living together, 10.8% had a female householder with no husband present, and 48.1% were not families. About 37.9% of all households were made up of individuals, and 9.5% had someone living alone who was 65 years of age or older. The average household size was 2.15, and the average family size was 2.88.

In the city, the age distribution was 20.3% under 18, 9.6% from 18 to 24, 35.9% from 25 to 44, 20.0% from 45 to 64, and 14.2% who were 65 or older. The median age was 36 years. For every 100 females, there were 98.1 males. For every 100 females age 18 and over, there were 96.4 males.

The median income for a household in the city was $38,943, and for a family was $47,290. Males had a median income of $32,636 versus $28,480 for females. The per capita income for the city was $20,904. About 4.9% of families and 8.2% of the population were below the poverty line, including 9.0% of those under age 18 and 7.5% of those age 65 or over.

== Government and infrastructure ==
The Federal Correctional Institution, Englewood, is named after Englewood, but is not near Englewood. It is in unincorporated Jefferson County.

=== Civic Center ===
Englewood City Hall

The Englewood Civic Center is located in the only remaining portion of the Cinderella City Mall. It contains the Englewood Public Library, The Museum of Outdoor Arts, and all city departments, including the courts. The Civic Center also contains the RTD Englewood light rail station.

=== The Englewood Public Library ===
The Englewood Public Library is a full service library. There are computers for public use, as well as printers and copiers. The Library also has a small section on Colorado and Englewood history, a microfiche collection, and an archive of local history.

=== Neighborhoods ===
Belleview Park

Central Englewood can be roughly divided into quadrants, divided by Hampden Avenue and Broadway. The northwest is the oldest section of the city, containing the new City Center, downtown, and housing stock dating to the 1910s. This is also where the massive General Iron metal fabrication plant was located, which closed in the 1990s and has now been demolished, awaiting redevelopment and a new proposed light-rail station at Bates Avenue. The southwest section is home to a newer housing stock, as well as a significant percentage of Englewood's industrial and production facilities.

The southwest side also features Belleview Park, its largest park, and a small reservoir. The southeast section is almost purely residential, and is newer than the north and southwest sides. Finally, northeast Englewood is home to one of the largest hospital complexes in the metro area. Swedish Medical Center and Craig Hospital, a top-10, nationally ranked rehabilitation hospital for spinal cord and traumatic brain injury rehabilitation, comprise the hospital district, the backbone of the city economy. The Hampden Hills neighborhood hosts one of the largest conglomeration of apartment complexes in the metro area, and is also the newest developed part of the city, as well as the wealthiest.

Englewood also features some large annexed areas, such as the northwest annex that extends to Evans Avenue in Denver, which is chiefly manufacturing and industry. Finally, Englewood extends southeast to the Highline Canal, and southwest past Federal Blvd. approaching the town of Bow Mar.

== Education ==
Most of the City of Englewood is served by the Englewood Public Schools. Small parts of the city are served by the Littleton Public Schools and the Sheridan Public Schools. Some of neighboring Cherry Hills Village is within the Englewood school district.

The Englewood district has two high schools: Englewood High and Colorado's Finest High School Of Choice. The two middle schools are Englewood Middle School and Englewood Leadership Academy. The four elementary schools are Bishop, Clayton, Charles Hay, and Cherrelyn.

The city is also home to a number of private schools, including All Souls School, a K-8 school.

Saint Louis School, a Catholic K-12 institution, was scheduled to close in 2016.

Also, the city used to host the Denver Seminary, an evangelical graduate-level religious school that has since relocated to Littleton. The former seminary site has been redeveloped into residential apartments and retail. Englewood is also the location of Humanex Academy, a private, alternative middle and high school for students who have learning disabilities and emotional and behavior disorders.

== Economy ==
=== Top employers ===
According to the city's 2017 and 2024 Comprehensive Annual Financial Reports, the top employers in the city have been listed as:

#	Employer	2014	2017	2023
1	Swedish Medical Center	1	1	1
2	Craig Hospital	2	2	2
3	Groove Toyota Dealership	5	6	3
4	Metro Community Provider Network	4	8	4
5	Veolia Transportation	-	-	5
6	Rollinc Staffing	-	-	6
7	Walmart	10	-	7
8	Meadow Gold Dairies	9	-	8
9	Ouray Sportswear	-	-	9
10	American Bottling/7-up	8	-	10

== Adjacent municipalities and unincorporated areas ==
The place name "Englewood" is assigned to four ZIP codes (80110, 80111, 80112, 80113) which covers areas adjacent to the city on the west and east, and an area southeast of the city that is much larger than the city itself. Thus, many addresses written as "Englewood, Colorado" are actually in the Arapahoe County cities of Sheridan, Cherry Hills Village, Greenwood Village, or Centennial; or in Meridian in unincorporated Douglas County. This area includes part of the Denver Tech Center and the surrounding commercial development along the I-25 corridor, which is often erroneously attributed to Englewood; the city actually lies several miles west.

	North: Denver	
West: Sheridan, Bow Mar, Denver, Littleton		East: Denver, Cherry Hills Village, Greenwood Village
	South: Littleton, Greenwood Village	

== Notable people and points of interest ==
Notable individuals who were born in or have lived in Englewood include missionary and archaeologist David Crockett Graham, civil rights activist Carlotta Walls LaNier, railroad executive Louis W. Menk, and former MLB pitcher Brad Lidge.

The Merrill Wheel-Balancing System, the world's first electronic dynamic wheel-balancing system, was invented in the town at the Merrill Engineering Laboratories.

== See also ==
- Front Range Urban Corridor
