= Hinkley High School =

Public school in Colorado, United States

William C. Hinkley High School
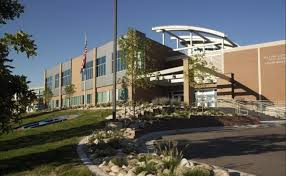
- Hinkley High school in 2008

Location
- 1250 Chambers Road; Aurora, Colorado 80011; United States; 39°44′05″N 104°48′31″W

Information
- Motto: Bring the Thunder
- Established: 1963 (63 years ago)
- School district: Aurora Public Schools
- CEEB code: 060073
- Principal: Jennifer Abeyta-Cifuentes
- Teaching staff: 70.00 (FTE)
- Grades: 9-12
- Enrollment: 1,527 (2024–2025)
- Student to teacher ratio: 21.81
- Colors: Cadet blue and silver
- Athletics: 5A
- Athletics conference: Skyline League
- Mascot: Thunder
- Website: hinkley.aurorak12.org

William C. Hinkley High School or simply Hinkley High School is a public high school in Aurora, Colorado, United States. It is one of eight high schools in Aurora Public Schools. In 2007, Hinkley was ranked within the top 1000 public high schools in the United States by Newsweek.

Hinkley's student newspaper is The Talon.

Hinkley is an Engineering and Biomedical pathway school.

== IB Programme ==
Hinkley offers one of the district's few International Baccalaureate programmes, and is one of only a handful of schools to offer an IB Human Rights course.

In order to ease the 150-hour community service requirement of the IB Programme, a student organization known as the Landmines Task Force was created. The group raised money and awareness regarding the international landmine problem, donating through the United Nations Association's Adopt-A-Minefield to help eradicate landmines in Mozambique. As of 2007, the group had raised over $20,000. The program was started by IB HL African History teacher Christine Sundberg in the 2003/2004 school year; the program was ended after the 2008/2009 school year.

== Demographics ==
- 58.5% Latino
- 14.3% White
- 19.5% African American
- 7.3% Asian
- 0.4% Native American

Hinkley's free/reduced lunch rate is 62% of the students.

== Athletics ==
Hinkley has won five CHSAA state championships. Their most successful sport is boys basketball, in which they won two titles (1994 and 1998).

=== Football ===
- 1997 State 4A champions

=== Basketball ===
==== Boys Basketball ====
- 1994 State 5A champions
- 1998 State 4A champions

=== Baseball ===
- 1979 State AAA champions

=== Cross Country ===
==== Boys Cross Country ====
- 1964 State Division II champions

== Notable alumni ==
- Chris Broderick, former lead guitarist for Megadeth, 2008 – 2014
- Will Donato - jazz musician
- Brian Fisher, former MLB player (New York Yankees, Pittsburgh Pirates, Houston Astros, Seattle Mariners)
- Joel Steed, former NFL Nose Tackle, Pittsburgh Steelers
