= Aurora Public Schools (Colorado) =

School district in Colorado, United States

Adams-Arapahoe 28J School District Aurora Public Schools

Address
- 15701 E. 1st Ave. #206 Aurora, Colorado, 80011; United States
- Coordinates: 39°43′57″N 104°50′52″W

District information
- Motto: Every student shapes a successful future!
- Established: 1962; 64 years ago
- Superintendent: Michael Giles, Jr.
- NCES District ID: 0802340

Students and staff
- Enrollment: 37,907 (2020-2021)
- Staff: 2,403.09 (on an FTE basis)
- Student–teacher ratio: 15.77

Other information
- Website: aurorak12.org

The Adams-Arapahoe 28J School District, more commonly known as the Aurora Public Schools, is a public school system in Aurora, Colorado, United States. There are 58 schools in the district: 4 early childhood education centers, 20 elementary schools, 9 P-8/K-8 schools, 5 middle schools, 1 grades 6-12 academy, 5 high schools, 4 magnet schools, 9 charter schools, and 1 of only 5 vocational–technical colleges in the state. They also offer 4 programs: 1 online program, 2 magnet high school programs and 1 home school support program.

The district territory spans the southwestern and northwestern corners of Adams County and Arapahoe County, respectively, extending beyond Aurora city limits to include unincorporated portions of both counties. While the Aurora School District originally included all of Aurora, annexations since the 1960s have extended the city into four other districts, primarily the Cherry Creek School District.

== History ==
The first school district in Aurora was created at the request of William Smith by the Arapahoe County School Superintendent around 1885. It was known as Arapahoe County District #28 by 1907, and later Aurora School District. Aurora Public Schools was formed in 1962 from Aurora, Altura, Clyde Miller, First Creek, Sable, and Tollgate Districts.

By 2024, the district received an influx of students from Colombia and Venezuela. The district made measures to welcome the students.

== Schools ==
=== Preschools ===
- Early Beginnings
- Jamaica Child Development Center
- Laredo Child Development Center
- Meadowood Child Development Center
- Sable Child Development Center

=== Elementary schools ===
- Altura Elementary School
- Arkansas Elementary School
- Crawford Elementary School
- Dalton Elementary School
- Dartmouth Elementary School
- Elkhart Elementary School
- Escuela Bilingue Betty Hernandez
- Fulton Academy of Excellence
- Iowa Elementary School
- Jewell Elementary School
- Kenton Elementary Schools
- Lansing Elementary School
- Laredo Elementary School
- Montview Elementary School
- Park Lane Elementary School
- Side Creek Elementary School
- Tollgate Elementary School of Expeditionary Learning
- Vassar Elementary School
- Vaughn Elementary School
- Virginia Court Elementary School
- Yale Elementary School

=== Middle schools ===
- Aurora Hills Middle School
- Aurora West College Preparatory Academy (Grades 6-12)
- Columbia Middle School
- East Middle School
- Mrachek Middle School
- North Middle School Health Sciences and Technology Campus

=== P-8/K-8 schools ===
- Aurora Frontier P-8
- Aurora Highlands P-8
- Aurora Quest K-8
- Boston P-8
- Clyde Miller P-8
- Coal Creek P-8
- Del Mar Academy P-8
- Harmony Ridge P-8
- Mosley P-8
- Murphy Creek P-8
- Vista PEAK Exploratory P-8

=== Magnet Schools ===
- Aurora Quest K-8
- Clara Brown Entrepreneurial Academy K-8
- Charles Burrell Visual & Performing Arts Campus
- William Smith High School

=== High schools ===
- Aurora Central High School
- Aurora West College Preparatory Academy (9-12)
- Gateway High School
- Rangeview High School
- Vista PEAK Preparatory School
- William C. Hinkley High School

=== Charter schools ===
- Academy of Advanced Learning
- Aurora Academy
- Aurora Expeditionary Learning Academy
- Aurora Science & Tech, a DSST Public School
- Global Village Academy
- Lotus School for Excellence
- Rocky Mountain Prep Academy
- Vanguard Classical School
- Vega Collegiate Academy

=== Alternative programs ===
- APS Avenues Online Program
- Crossroads Center
- GED
- IB Middle Years Programme
- International Baccalaureate Programme
- Options Schools

=== Career and technical education schools ===
- Pickens Technical College
