= Pueblo School District 60 =

School district in Colorado, United States

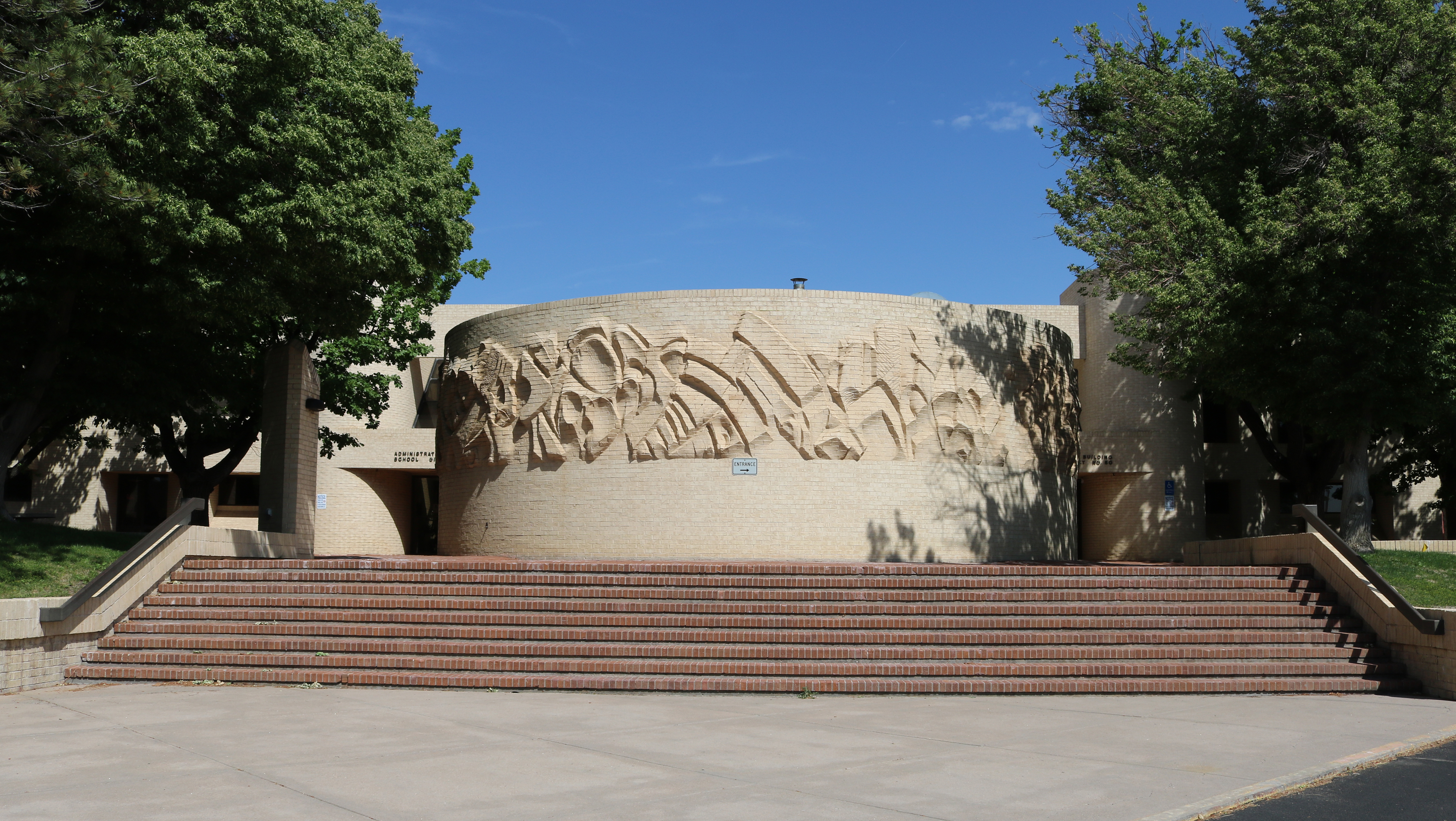
- Administration building entrance area

Address
- 315 West 11th Street Pueblo, Colorado, 81003; United States
- Coordinates: 38°16′39″N 104°36′40″W

District information
- Type: Public
- Grades: K–12
- Established: March 4, 1946 (80 years ago)
- Superintendent: Dr. Barbara Kimzey
- Asst. superintendent(s): Suzane Morey, Eric DeCesaro
- Business administrator: David Horner, CFO
- School board: 5 members, elected at large, alternating four-year terms
- Chair of the board: Margaret B. Wright
- Governing agency: Colorado Department of Education
- Schools: Elementary 17, Middle 4, High 4, Alternative/online high school 1, International Baccalaureate magnet 2, Charter 2
- Budget: $595,724,512 (2021-2022)
- NCES District ID: 0806120
- District ID: CO-51010

Students and staff
- Students: 15,219 (2020–2021)
- Faculty: 920.92 (FTE)
- Staff: 1,045.37 (FTE)
- Student–teacher ratio: 16.53:1

Other information
- Website: www.pueblod60.org

Pueblo School District 60 (D60), formerly Pueblo City Schools, is a school district serving Pueblo, Colorado. Its headquarters, the Administrative Services Center, are in Pueblo.

The district includes the majority of the City of Pueblo, as well as the Salt Creek census-designated place and a piece of Blende CDP.

== History ==
It was formed on March 4, 1946, with the consolidation of Pueblo School District 1 and Pueblo School District 20 to form Pueblo School District 60. It was known as Pueblo City Schools from 2006 until it reverted to its original name in August 2019.

== Schools ==
=== High schools ===
- Central High School
- Centennial High School
- East High School
- South High School

=== K-8 schools ===
- Goodnight School
- Nettie S. Freed Expeditionary School

=== 4-8 schools ===
- Corwin International Magnet School

=== Middle schools ===
- Heaton Middle School
- Pueblo Academy of Arts
- Risley International Academy of Innovation

=== Elementary schools ===
Zoned:

- Baca Elementary School
- Belmont Elementary School
- Columbian Elementary School
- Franklin Elementary School
- Haaff Elementary School
- Heritage Elementary School
- Highland Park Elementary School
- Irving Elementary School
- Minnequa Elementary School
- Morton Elementary School
- Park View School of Discovery
- South Park Elementary School
- Sunset Park Elementary School

Magnet-only:

- Fountain International Magnet School (K-3)

=== Charter schools ===
- Chavez-Huerta K-12 Preparatory Academy
- Pueblo School for Arts and Sciences

== Other facilities ==
The Orman-Adams Mansion, now a private residence, was used by the school district from 1952 until 1979; the district used it for office space.
