= Gateway High School (Colorado) =

Public school in Colorado, United States

Location
- 1300 South Sable Boulevard; Aurora, Colorado 80012; United States; 39°41′37″N 104°49′3″W

Information
- Established: 1973 (53 years ago)
- School district: Aurora Public Schools
- Superintendent: Michael Giles, Jr.
- CEEB code: 060071
- Principal: Amanda McDonald
- Staff: 73.00 (on an FTE basis)
- Grades: 9-12
- Enrollment: 1,641 (2023–2024)
  - Grade 9: 432
  - Grade 10: 409
  - Grade 11: 346
  - Grade 12: 454
- Student to teacher ratio: 22.48
- Campus type: Urban
- Colors: Orange, yellow, black
- Athletics: 5A
- Athletics conference: East Metro 5A
- Mascot: Olympian
- Website: gateway.aurorak12.org

Gateway High School is a public high school in Aurora, Colorado, United States. It is one of five high schools in Aurora Public Schools, and the school offers a variety of Advanced Placement courses.

Gateway's student newspaper is The Gateway Medallion and the yearbook is The Olympiad.

== Performing arts ==
Percussion:

- State champions, 1994-1999, 2003-2004 (Rocky Mountain Percussion Association, Concert Class)
- World champions, 1996, 1997 (Winter Guard International (WGI) Percussion Scholastic Concert World Class)

== Athletics ==
Softball:

- 1992 6A State champions

== Demographics ==
The demographic breakdown of the 1438 students enrolled in 2020–2021 was as follows:

- Native American: 0.9%
- Asian: 4.1%
- Black: 17.5%
- Hispanic: 59.5%
- White: 11.8%
- Native Hawaiian/Pacific Islander: 2.2%
- Two or more races: 3.9%

54.3% of the students were male, and 45.7% were female. 71.2% of the students were eligible for free or reduced lunch.

== Notable alumni ==
- Bill Ritter, 41st Governor of Colorado
- Zack Golditch, Professional football player for the Kansas City Chiefs
- Michelle Howard, Vice Chief of Naval Operations, United States Navy
- Tia Fuller, Grammy-nominated jazz musician
- Clyde Rucker, CEO of Quiznos
- David Von Drehle, journalist
- Mike Nawrocki, Co-creator of VeggieTales and creator of Dead Sea Squirrels
