= Brush, Colorado =

Statutory city in Morgan County, Colorado, United States

- Statutory city
- City of Brush
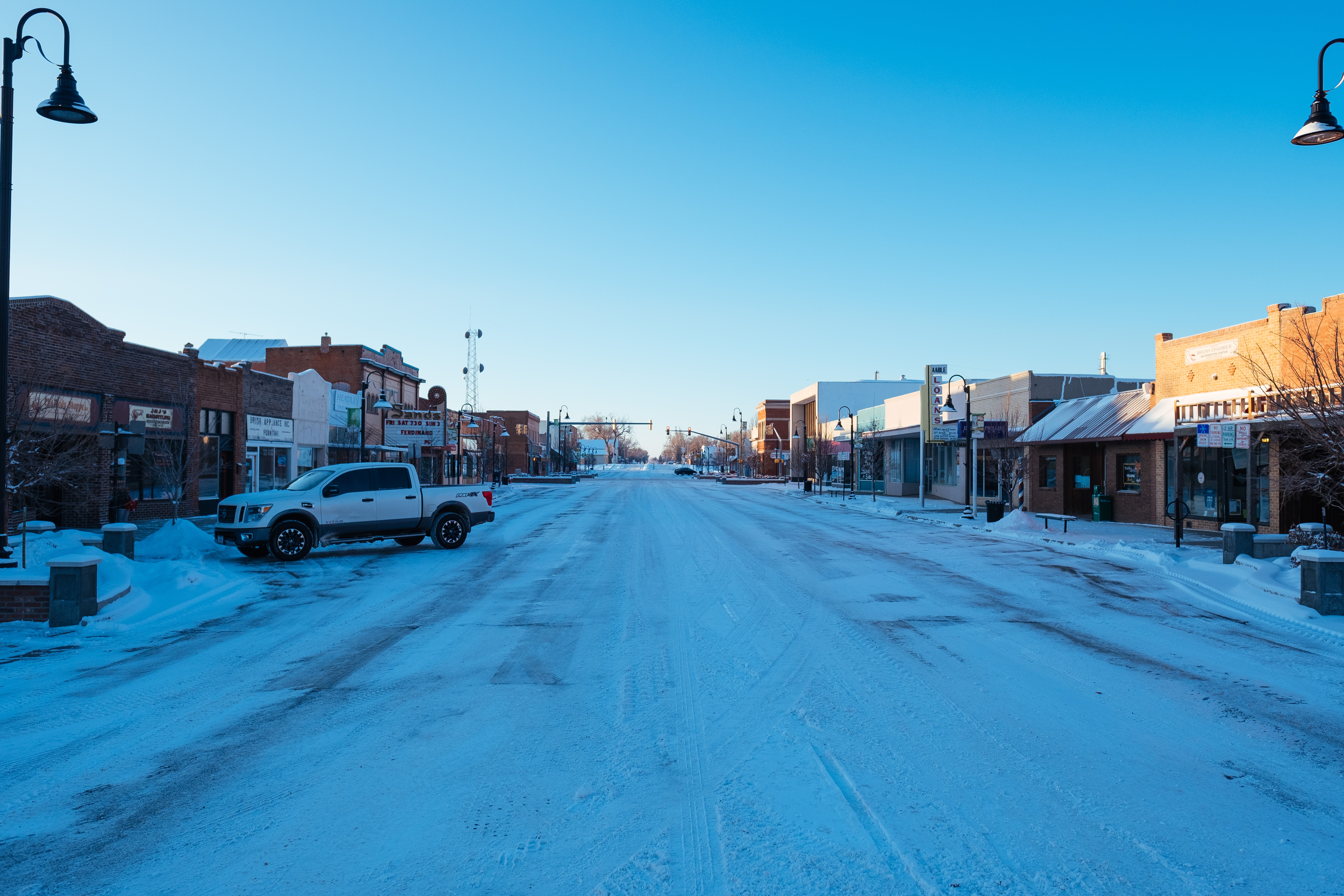
- Brush, Colorado.

- Seal

- Location within Morgan County, Colorado
- Coordinates: 40°15′20″N 103°37′23″W
- Country: United States
- State: Colorado
- County: Morgan County
- Incorporated: November 24, 1884

Government
  - Type: Statutory City

Area
  - Statutory city: 2.834 sq mi (7.339 km^{2})
  - Land: 2.831 sq mi (7.331 km^{2})
  - Water: 0.0031 sq mi (0.008 km^{2})
- Elevation: 4,239 ft (1,292 m)

Population (2020)
  - Statutory city: 5,339
  - Density: 1,886/sq mi (728/km^{2})
  - Metro: 29,111
- Time zone: UTC−07:00 (MST)
  - Summer (DST): UTC−06:00 (MDT)
- ZIP code: 80723
- Area code: 970
- GNIS city ID: 2409926
- FIPS code: 08-09555
- Website: City of Brush

Brush is a statutory city located in Morgan County, Colorado, United States. The city population was 5,339 at the 2020 United States census. Brush is a part of the Fort Morgan, CO Micropolitan Statistical Area.

== History ==
The Brush, Colorado, post office opened on September 19, 1882, and the Town of Brush was incorporated on November 24, 1884. Brush was named for Jared L. Brush, who was a Colorado cattle pioneer. Brush had never lived in Brush, Colorado, instead helping to settle what is now known as Greeley. Brush later served as Lieutenant Governor of Colorado and liked to visit "his town" often. An alternative thought for how the town received its name was that in 1883 the town mayor told his councilmen that he would come up with the town's name in a fortnight's time. Two weeks later, he was approached in his horse stable, and when he was asked what the town shall be named, he looked down at the object he was brushing his horse with and declared it should be called 'Brush'.

Brush is on the Loewen database of possible sundown towns.

== Geography ==
At the 2020 United States census, the city had a total area of 1,814 acres (7.339 km^{2}) including 2.0 acres (0.008 km^{2}) of water.

=== Climate ===
According to the Köppen Climate Classification system, Brush has a semi-arid climate, abbreviated "BSk" on climate maps.

Climate data for Brush, Colorado
Month	Jan	Feb	Mar	Apr	May	Jun	Jul	Aug	Sep	Oct	Nov	Dec	Year
Mean daily maximum °C (°F)	4 (39)	6 (43)	10 (50)	16 (60)	21 (70)	27 (81)	32 (89)	31 (87)	26 (79)	19 (66)	10 (50)	6 (42)	17 (63)
Mean daily minimum °C (°F)	−11 (12)	−9 (16)	−6 (22)	−1 (31)	6 (42)	11 (51)	14 (58)	13 (56)	8 (47)	2 (35)	−6 (22)	−9 (15)	1 (34)
Average precipitation mm (inches)	10 (0.4)	13 (0.5)	25 (1)	46 (1.8)	74 (2.9)	64 (2.5)	71 (2.8)	48 (1.9)	38 (1.5)	25 (1)	15 (0.6)	15 (0.6)	440 (17.5)
Source: Weatherbase

== Demographics ==
Historical population
Census	Pop.	Note	%±
1890	112		—
1900	381		240.2%
1910	997		161.7%
1920	2,103		110.9%
1930	2,312		9.9%
1940	2,481		7.3%
1950	2,431		−2.0%
1960	3,621		49.0%
1970	3,377		−6.7%
1980	4,082		20.9%
1990	4,165		2.0%
2000	5,117		22.9%
2010	5,463		6.8%
2020	5,339		−2.3%
U.S. Decennial Census

=== 2020 census ===
As of the 2020 census, Brush had a population of 5,339. The median age was 38.9 years. 24.6% of residents were under the age of 18 and 21.3% of residents were 65 years of age or older. For every 100 females there were 93.2 males, and for every 100 females age 18 and over there were 88.3 males age 18 and over.

97.8% of residents lived in urban areas, while 2.2% lived in rural areas.

There were 1,952 households in Brush, of which 32.4% had children under the age of 18 living in them. Of all households, 44.6% were married-couple households, 19.5% were households with a male householder and no spouse or partner present, and 29.8% were households with a female householder and no spouse or partner present. About 31.3% of all households were made up of individuals and 15.5% had someone living alone who was 65 years of age or older.

There were 2,132 housing units, of which 8.4% were vacant. The homeowner vacancy rate was 1.3% and the rental vacancy rate was 9.3%.

Racial composition as of the 2020 census
Race	Number	Percent
White	3,533	66.2%
Black or African American	73	1.4%
American Indian and Alaska Native	71	1.3%
Asian	43	0.8%
Native Hawaiian and Other Pacific Islander	2	0.0%
Some other race	871	16.3%
Two or more races	746	14.0%
Hispanic or Latino (of any race)	2,096	39.3%

=== 2000 census ===
As of the census of 2000, there were 5,117 people, 1,836 households, and 1,233 families residing in the city. The population density was 2,120.0 inhabitants per square mile (818.5/km^{2}). There were 1,923 housing units at an average density of 796.7 per square mile (307.6/km^{2}). The racial makeup of the population in the city was 75.81% White, 0.39% African American, 0.51% Native American, 0.16% Asian, 0.04% Pacific Islander, 20.19% from other races, and 2.91% from two or more races. Hispanic or Latino of any race were 50.00% of the population.

There were 1,836 households, out of which 35.1% had children under the age of 18 living with them, 53.8% were married couples living together, 9.6% had a female householder with no husband present, and 32.8% were non-families. 28.6% of all households were made up of individuals, and 15.2% had someone living alone who was 65 years of age or older. The average household size was 2.64 and the average family size was 3.29.

In the city, the population was spread out, with 28.3% under the age of 18, 8.5% from 18 to 24, 25.7% from 25 to 44, 18.7% from 45 to 64, and 18.8% who were 65 years of age or older. The median age was 35 years. For every 100 females, there were 91.6 males. For every 100 females age 18 and over, there were 88.3 males.

The median income for a household in the city was $31,333, and the median income for a family was $39,094. Males had a median income of $24,431 versus $20,371 for females. The per capita income for the city was $14,672. About 5.4% of families and 10.4% of the population were below the poverty line, including 10.1% of those under age 18 and 13.1% of those age 65 or over.

== Culture ==
Agriculture and ranching make up a large part of the local economy. The Brush Rodeo is held each July. The Morgan County Fair showcases the community's 4-H projects and livestock.

The Brush Industrial Park contains a 272-bed prison in a correctional complex that has been vacant since 2010. In 2017, plans were to use an outbuilding as a treatment center for autistic spectrum disorders.

The East Morgan County Library is located in Brush.

The city museum is housed in a former schoolhouse.

The Brush High School mascot is the Beetdigger, signifying the importance of the annual sugar beet crop. The football team, winner of multiple state championships, plays its games at Beetdigger Stadium.

== Education ==
=== School District ===
- Brush School District Re 2J

=== Elementary schools ===
- Thomson Primary School
  - Address: 422 Ray Street
- Beaver Valley Elementary School
  - Address: 2710 Mill Street

=== Combined Secondary Campus ===
- Brush Secondary Campus
  - Address: 1600 Mill Street

== Transportation ==
=== Major highways ===
- Interstate 76 connects Brush to Denver, located 93 miles southwest. To the northeast, Brush is linked with Interstate 80 in Big Springs, Nebraska, via Sterling, Colorado.
- Business Loop 76 runs on Edison Street, reaching Fort Morgan in its west end.
- US 6 connects Provincetown, Massachusetts to Bishop, California, via Nevada, Colorado, Illinois and 9 other states.
- US 34 links Granby, Colorado with Berwyn, Illinois, passing through Nebraska and Iowa. In Colorado, it connects Brush to Greeley and Loveland.
- State Highway 71 runs from US 350, near La Junta to Nebraska state border, where it becomes Nebraska Highway 71.

== Local notables ==
- Pat Day, 1992 Kentucky Derby winner and a member of the jockey Hall of Fame, was born in Brush.

== See also ==
- Fort Morgan, CO Micropolitan Statistical Area
