= Brush High School (Colorado) =

Location
- 1600 Mill Street; Brush, Colorado 80723; United States
- Coordinates: 40°15′31″N 103°38′16″W

Information
- School district: Brush RE-2J
- CEEB code: 060150
- NCES School ID: 080261000154
- Principal: Bradley Bass
- Teaching staff: 24.83
- Grades: 9–12
- Enrollment: 350 (2024–25)
- Student to teacher ratio: 14.10
- Colors: Maroon and gold
- Athletics conference: CHSAA
- Mascot: Beetdigger
- Feeder schools: Brush Middle School
- Website: www.brushschools.org/o/bhs

Brush High School is a public high school in Brush, Colorado, United States. It is the only high school in Brush School District. In the 2024–25 academic year, the school enrolled 350 students.

== History ==
In 2019, the Brush School District opened the Brush Secondary Campus, which now houses both Brush Middle School and Brush High School.

== Academics ==
=== Enrollment ===
In the 2024–25 academic year, Brush High School enrolled 350 students and employed 24.83 classroom teachers (on a full-time equivalent basis), for a student-to-teacher ratio of 14.10.
