= Hanover Junior/Senior High School =

Location
- 17050 South Peyton Highway; Colorado Springs, Colorado 80928; United States
- Coordinates: 38°35′4″N 104°27′44″W

Information
- School type: Public high school
- Motto: Own Your Education!
- School district: Hanover 28
- CEEB code: 060280
- NCES School ID: 080450000661
- Principal: Greg Biga
- Teaching staff: 11.32 (on an FTE basis)
- Grades: 6–12
- Gender: Coeducational
- Enrollment: 134 (2024–25)
- Student to teacher ratio: 11.84
- Campus type: Rural, Distant
- Colors: Blue and yellow
- Athletics conference: Black Forest
- Mascot: Hornet
- Feeder schools: Prairie Heights Elementary School
- Website: jshs.hanoverhornets.org

Hanover Junior/Senior High School is a public combined middle and high school in rural El Paso County, Colorado, southeast of Colorado Springs.
