= South High School (Pueblo, Colorado) =

Location
- 1801 Hollywood Drive; Pueblo, Colorado 81005; United States
- Coordinates: 38°14′11″N 104°39′19″W

Information
- School type: Public high school
- Established: 1959; 67 years ago
- School district: Pueblo 60
- CEEB code: 061207
- NCES School ID: 080612001064
- Principal: Michael Kovac
- Teaching staff: 46.14 (on an FTE basis)
- Grades: 9–12
- Gender: Coeducational
- Enrollment: 895 (2023–24)
- Student to teacher ratio: 19.40
- Colors: Black and white
- Athletics conference: CHSAA
- Mascot: Colt
- Feeder schools: Pueblo Academy of Arts
- Website: south.pueblod60.org
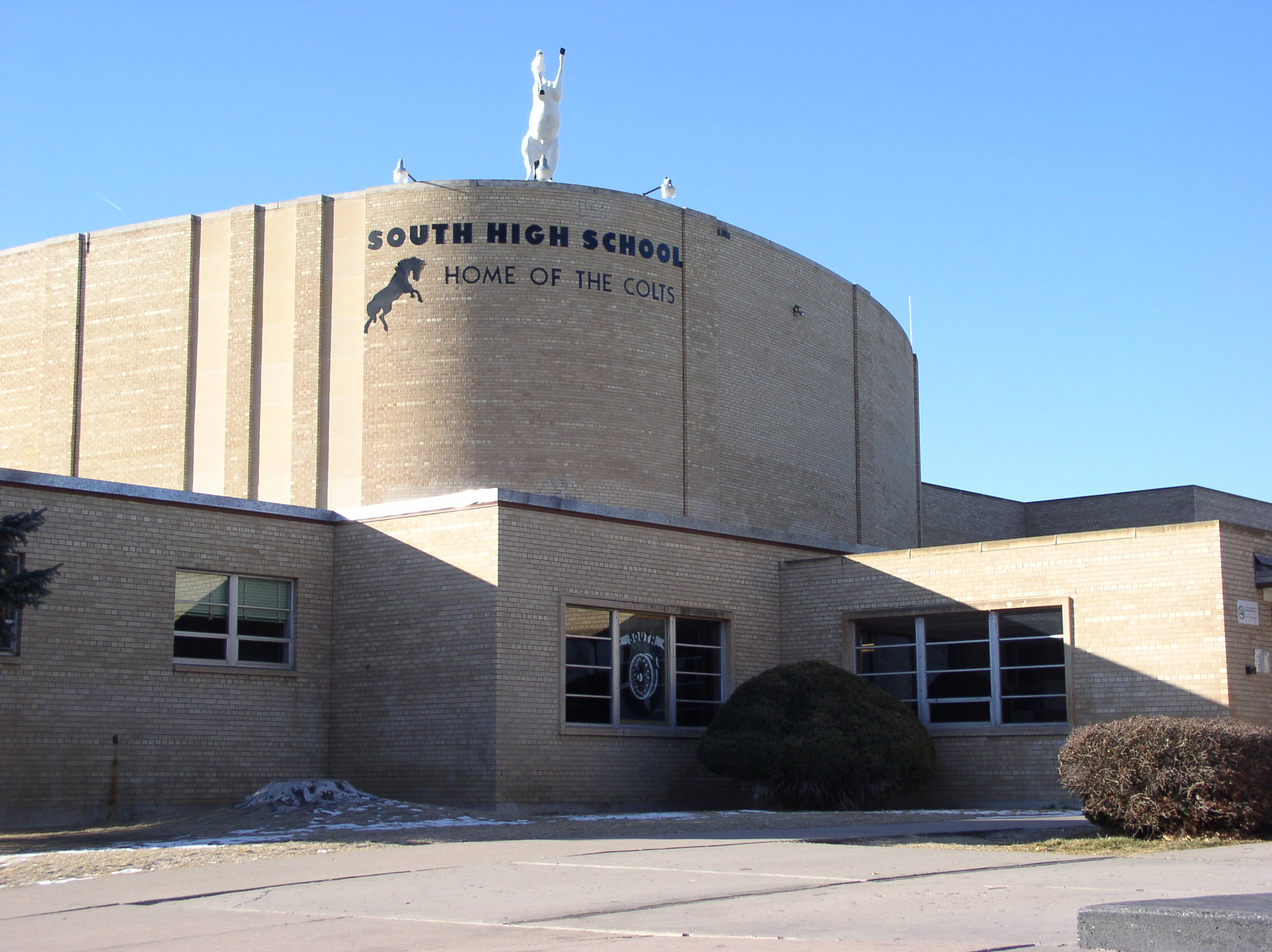

South High School is the second-oldest high school in Pueblo School District 60 and is located on the south side of Pueblo, Colorado, United States.

The school's colors are black and white, and the mascot is the colt.

== History ==
South High School was initially founded in 1959.

South High School's first graduating class was the class of 1960. The first principal was David A. Wilkerson.

In the 1969-1970 school year, a grant was given to the school, allowing expansion for the addition of 9th graders and a new swimming pool. a school newspaper called The ROUND-UP was formed.

In the 1974-1975 school year, more renovations occurred, with new lettering on the building, redone tennis courts, re-grassing of the baseball field, additions to a gymnastics auxiliary gym, a portable classroom, and a new media center and swimming pool.

In the 1975-1976 school year, a civil war cannon was purchased by South and East High School's key clubs to be used as a trophy between the two schools' football teams in the Cannon Game. The Grade Point Average (GPA) system was introduced.

In the 1976-1977 school year, the first Cannon Game was held, with the Colts winning the cannon 27-21.

In the 1981-1982 school year, a horseshoe statue was gifted to the school that is currently at the front of the school.

In the 1988-1989 school year, the auditorium received a $170,000 renovation with the first musical to be hosted with the new equipment being "Once Upon A Mattress". A mock election was held, with the results predicting a George Bush victory.

In the 1989-1990 school year, 250 students protested against the school's attendance/tardy policy. Landscaping around the school was completed and a girls' softball team was formed.
