= Miami-Yoder School District JT-60 =

School district in Colorado, United States

Address
- 420 South Rush Road Rush, Colorado, 80833; United States

District information
- Type: Public
- Grades: PreK–12
- NCES District ID: 0805670

Students and staff
- Students: 340
- Teachers: 19.28
- Staff: 58.29
- Student–teacher ratio: 17.63

Other information
- Website: miamiyoder.com

Miami-Yoder School District 60JT is a school district headquartered in Rush, Colorado.

The district serves preschool, elementary, middle, and high school levels. The school building also functions as a community event center. Some of the events include a Vendor Fair for Holiday shopping, Trunk or Treat, Veteran's Day Parade, and an Easter Egg Hunt. As of 2017 the district had 318 students in its Miami-Yoder School facility.
