= Niwot High School =

Location
- 8989 East Niwot Road; Niwot, Colorado 80503; United States; 40°6′13″N 105°8′40″W

Information
- School type: Public high school
- Motto: At Niwot High School, You Matter
- School district: St. Vrain Valley RE-1J
- CEEB code: 060937
- NCES School ID: 080537000918
- Principal: Eric Rauschkolb
- Teaching staff: 63.16 (FTE)
- Grades: 9–12
- Enrollment: 1,466 (2023–2024)
- Student to teacher ratio: 23.21
- Colors: Kelly green and silver
- Athletics conference: CHSAA
- Mascot: Cougar
- Website: nhs.svvsd.org

Niwot High School (NHS) is a public high school located in Niwot, Colorado. It is the International Baccalaureate high school of the St. Vrain Valley School District.

== Background ==
Niwot High School is situated about halfway between the cities of Boulder and Longmont in the small unincorporated town of Niwot. First opened in 1972, Niwot High School has been a part of the community for over 50 years.

Niwot High School enrolled 1,177 students in the 2019-2020 school year. For students of Sunset Middle School, Niwot High School is the default location to continue their education. The school also attracts students from throughout the school district to participate in its International Baccalaureate program. The number of graduates in each class is typically around 300 students.

== Demographics ==
The demographic breakdown of the 1,509 students attending in the 2024-2025 school year:

- American Indian/Alaska Native: 0.27%
- Asian: 5.57%
- Native Hawaiian/Pacific Islander: 0.07%
- Hispanic: 24.39%
- Black: 1.33%
- White: 64.02%
- Two or more races: 4.37%

(Percentages may not add to 100% due to rounding)

== History ==
The school's original construction was delayed, so for the first semester of the 1972–1973 school year, students attended classes at the Longmont High School building after regular hours. Niwot High School was finished on December 22, 1972. The first class of students was given the honor to choose the school's colors, mascot, and motto. These were two students from each class that was to attend the new school. The colors were kelly green and silver, the mascot was a cougar named "Carrie", and the motto was "Our Pride is Our Life". There were no seniors in the first year because the district did not want to remove current seniors from their home schools to finish their final year in a new school. Thus, the class of 1974 was the first graduating class, and the class of 1976 was the first to have been at Niwot for all four years. The football and baseball team won the conference championship their second year.

The school has had several additions since it was originally constructed; the new commons, auditorium, large gym, and a large portion of the lower wing were added after the school was originally built.

=== 2013 bomb scare ===
On Wednesday, January 10, 2013, a Niwot High School employee reported a note left on a restroom stall, claiming the "School will blow" on Friday, January 12, 2013. Police searched the building with detection dogs but found no explosive devices. According to authorities, they also found a "hit list" containing the names of 22 students. The school canceled all classes on the 12th, to be "cautious", and to allow the police to conduct a thorough search of the building. A 17-year-old wrestler at the school was arrested in connection with the hit list, but his name was not released because of his age.

== Athletics ==
In 2018, Niwot was runner-up for the BoCoPreps.com Cup, the highest finish in school history.

In 2023, sophomore Addy Ritzenhein won the Nike Cross Nationals girls championship race with a time of 17:10. In 2024, Ritzenhein signed an NIL Deal with ON Running as a sophomore.

In recent years, Niwot has been widely regarded as one of the top cross country programs in the nation. As of 2026, they have won 4 straight CHSAA boys cross country state championships (their 3 most recent while classified up from 4A to 5A) and 8 CHSAA girls cross country state championships in the last 9 years (6 in 4A, 2 in 5A). Niwot has qualified their boys and girls teams for Nike Cross Nationals several times. Their boys team won back-to-back team titles in 2024 and 2025, and their girls team placed runner-up in 2022, 2023, and 2025.

=== State championships ===
State Championships
Sport	No. of Championships	Year
Baseball	5	1998, 1999, 2000, 2004, 2005
Basketball, boys'	1	1993
Cross country, boys'	6	2019, 2020, 2023, 2024, 2025, 2026
Cross country, girls'	8	2018, 2019, 2020, 2021, 2022, 2023, 2025, 2026
Football	1	1990
Gymnastics, girls'	7	1991, 1994, 2000, 2001, 2015, 2018, 2024
Soccer, boys'	1	2009
Soccer, girls'	1	1995
Tennis, boys'	1	2020
Tennis, girls'	2	2008, 2018
Track & field, boys'	4	2019, 2021, 2025, 2026
Track & field, girls'	8	2013, 2014, 2015, 2019, 2021, 2024, 2025, 2026
Total	39	

== Notable alumni ==
- Meredith Emerson, murder victim
- Elise Cranny, long-distance runner
- Matt McChesney, NFL player
