= Frederick, Colorado =

Town in Colorado, United States

- Statutory Town
- Town of Frederick
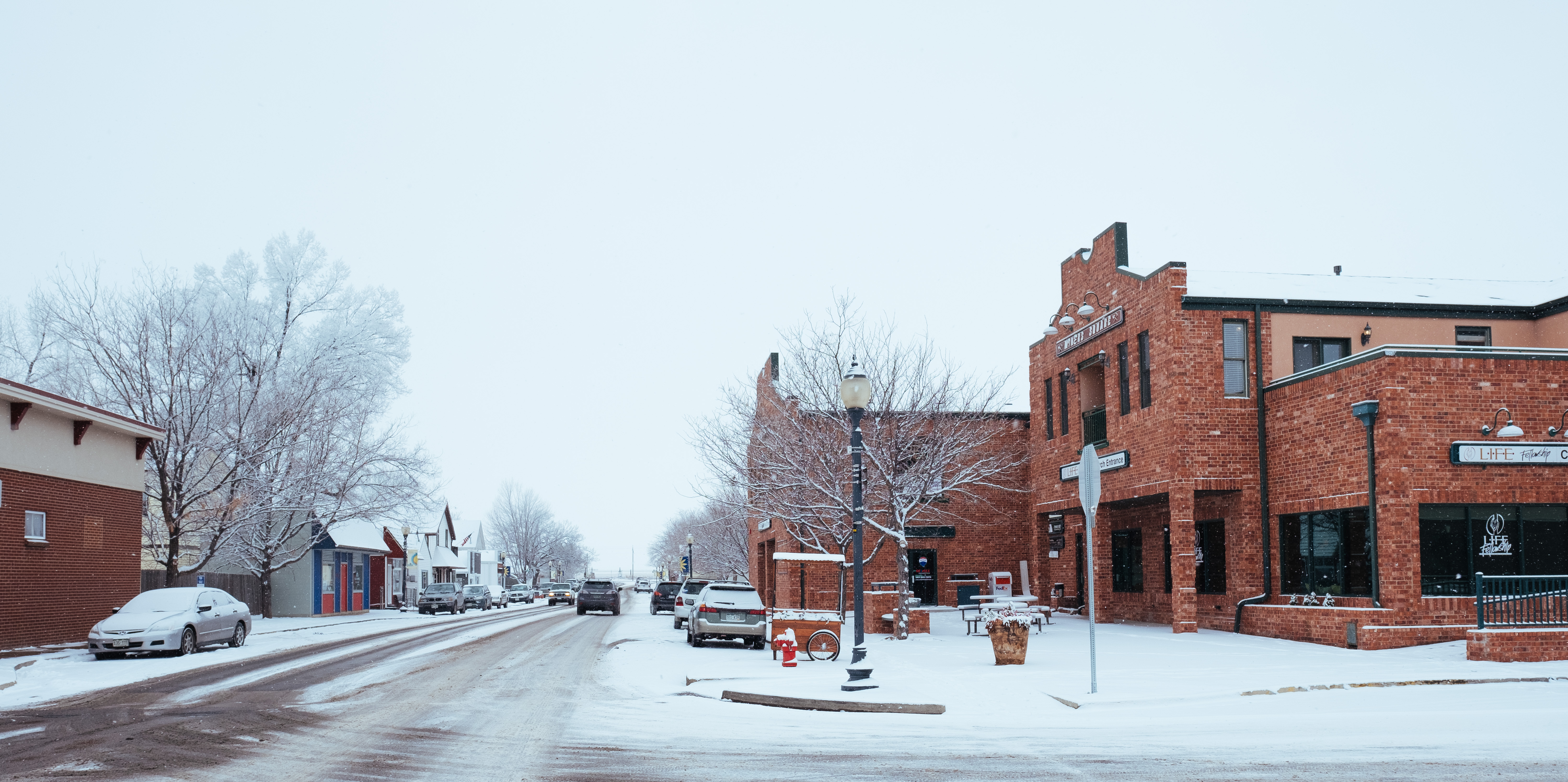
- Motto: Built on What Matters
- Location of the Town of Frederick in Weld County, Colorado
- Coordinates: 40°06′50″N 105°00′40″W
- Country: United States
- State: Colorado
- County: Weld County
- Incorporated (town): December 26, 1907
- Named for: Frederick A. Clark

Government
  - Type: Statutory Town

Area
  - Total: 15.221 sq mi (39.423 km^{2})
  - Land: 15.096 sq mi (39.099 km^{2})
  - Water: 0.125 sq mi (0.324 km^{2})
- Elevation: 4,938 ft (1,505 m)

Population (2020)
  - Total: 14,513
  - Density: 961/sq mi (371/km^{2})
- Time zone: UTC−07:00 (MST)
  - Summer (DST): UTC−06:00 (MDT)
- ZIP codes: 80504 & 80516 & 80530
- Area codes: 303, 720
- FIPS code: 08-28360
- GNIS feature ID: 2412656
- Website: www.frederickco.gov

The Town of Frederick is a Statutory Town located in Weld County, Colorado, United States. The town population was 14,513 at the 2020 United States census, a +67.22% increase since the 2010 United States census. Frederick is a part of the Greeley, CO Metropolitan Statistical Area and the Front Range Urban Corridor.

== History ==
Initially named McKissick for the mine owner, Frederick was renamed when the daughters of Frederick A. Clark, a land owner, laid out the town site in 1907 and named it for their father. Incorporated in 1907, the Town of Frederick began as a coal mining town attracting immigrants from Italy, France, Greece, Turkey, several Slavic countries and Latin America. The Frederick Coal mine closed in 1960.

In 2014 the town 're-branded' by designing a logo that is a stylized gas lamp with a mountain range background, and adopting the tag line "Built on What Matters". Prior to the re-branding the town primarily used the seal as a logo on town vehicles and letter head.

The town came to international media attention upon becoming the scene of a high-profile murder case in which resident Chris Watts killed his pregnant wife and their two daughters in August 2018.

== Geography ==
At the 2020 United States census, the town had a total area of 9,742 acres (39.423 km^{2}) including 80 acres (0.324 km^{2}) of water.

Immediately adjacent communities to Frederick are Firestone to the North, and Dacono to the South. Frederick, Firestone, and Dacono generally being called the 'Tri-Towns' or the 'Tri-Town area', the area in general being called 'Carbon Valley'. The next closest communities are Erie to the southwest, Longmont to the west, Fort Lupton to the east, and an unincorporated area of Weld County called DelCamino to the northwest. Within the incorporated area of the Town of Frederick is an unincorporated section called 'Evanston'.

== Demographics ==
Historical population
| Census | Pop. | Note | %± |
|---|---|---|---|
| 1910 | 266 | | — |
| 1920 | 361 | | 35.7% |
| 1930 | 596 | | 65.1% |
| 1940 | 652 | | 9.4% |
| 1950 | 599 | | −8.1% |
| 1960 | 595 | | −0.7% |
| 1970 | 696 | | 17.0% |
| 1980 | 855 | | 22.8% |
| 1990 | 988 | | 15.6% |
| 2000 | 2,467 | | 149.7% |
| 2010 | 8,679 | | 251.8% |
| 2020 | 14,513 | | 67.2% |
| 2023 (est.) | 17,676 | ▲ | 21.8% |
U.S. Decennial Census

=== 2020 census ===
As of the 2020 census, Frederick had a population of 14,513. The median age was 36.1 years. 27.7% of residents were under the age of 18 and 10.5% of residents were 65 years of age or older. For every 100 females there were 102.9 males, and for every 100 females age 18 and over there were 100.7 males age 18 and over.

83.9% of residents lived in urban areas, while 16.1% lived in rural areas.

There were 4,805 households in Frederick, of which 43.9% had children under the age of 18 living in them. Of all households, 69.6% were married-couple households, 11.4% were households with a male householder and no spouse or partner present, and 13.3% were households with a female householder and no spouse or partner present. About 12.7% of all households were made up of individuals and 4.6% had someone living alone who was 65 years of age or older.

There were 4,944 housing units, of which 2.8% were vacant. The homeowner vacancy rate was 1.4% and the rental vacancy rate was 4.1%.

Racial composition as of the 2020 census
| Race | Number | Percent |
|---|---|---|
| White | 11,518 | 79.4% |
| Black or African American | 100 | 0.7% |
| American Indian and Alaska Native | 90 | 0.6% |
| Asian | 504 | 3.5% |
| Native Hawaiian and Other Pacific Islander | 17 | 0.1% |
| Some other race | 602 | 4.1% |
| Two or more races | 1,682 | 11.6% |
| Hispanic or Latino (of any race) | 2,379 | 16.4% |

=== 2010 census ===
As of the census of 2010, there were 8,679 people in 3070 households. The racial makeup of the town was 7747 White, 47 African American, 181 Asian, 34 AIAN, 1 NHPI, 398 Other, with 1222 claiming Hispanic or Latino Ethnicity. 4369 were Male, 4310 were Female and 2692 under 18 years of age.

=== 2000 census ===
As of the 2000 census, there were 2,467 people, 852 households, and 684 families residing in the town. The population density was 286.4 inhabitants per square mile (110.6/km^{2}). There were 896 housing units at an average density of 104.0 per square mile (40.2/km^{2}). The racial makeup of the town was 87.15% White, 0.57% African American, 1.01% Native American, 0.81% Asian, 8.07% from other races, and 2.39% from two or more races. Hispanic or Latino of any race were 20.88% of the population.

There were 852 households, out of which 43.7% had children under the age of 18 living with them, 68.9% were married couples living together, 7.2% had a female householder with no husband present, and 19.7% were non-families. 13.5% of all households were made up of individuals, and 2.8% had someone living alone who was 65 years of age or older. The average household size was 2.90 and the average family size was 3.21.

In the town, the population was spread out, with 30.3% under the age of 18, 7.7% from 18 to 24, 38.2% from 25 to 44, 18.9% from 45 to 64, and 4.9% who were 65 years of age or older. The median age was 31 years. For every 100 females, there were 100.1 males. For every 100 females age 18 and over, there were 102.1 males.

The median income for a household in the town was $55,324, and the median income for a family was $56,394. Males had a median income of $39,191 versus $28,462 for females. The per capita income for the town was $20,602. About 4.6% of families and 4.8% of the population were below the poverty line, including 6.8% of those under age 18 and 3.2% of those age 65 or over.

== Education ==
Frederick Public Schools are part of the St. Vrain Valley School District. Schools located in Frederick include Frederick Senior High School, Thunder Valley (K-8), Legacy Elementary, and Carbon Valley Academy (Charter School).

== Politics ==
In 2017, Frederick residents voted in a recall election for the mayor and four of the town's trustees. On September 5, 2017, the town announced that 1,984 ballots were cast, the most of any election in the history of the town. Majorities of voters cast ballots in favor of all of the officials keeping their seats, by margins of at least 300 votes in each case.

== See also ==
- Greeley, CO Metropolitan Statistical Area
- Denver-Aurora-Greeley, CO Combined Statistical Area
- Front Range Urban Corridor
