= Silver Creek High School =

Silver Creek High School may refer to:

- Silver Creek High School (Longmont, Colorado)
- Silver Creek High School (San Jose, California)
- Silver Creek High School (Sellersburg, Indiana)
- Silver Creek High School (Silver Creek, New York)
