= Criminal Confessions =

American true crime television series

- Country of origin: United States
- Original language: English
- No. of seasons: 3
- No. of episodes: 38

Production
- Executive producers: Adam Kassen; Dan Peirson; Dick Wolf; Josh Bingham; Pam Healey; Tom Thayer
- Running time: 41-43 minutes
- Production companies: Shed Media; Wolf Reality

Original release
- Network: Oxygen
- Release: October 1, 2017 – March 7, 2020

Criminal Confessions is an American true crime television series that premiered October 1, 2017, and airs on Oxygen. Each episode features a different criminal case and showcases footage from inside actual police interrogation rooms and dissects what it takes to yield a confession. Police officers and detectives walk viewers through their strategy, as interviews with the suspects' and victims' friends and family shed light on the details of the case.

== Episodes ==
=== Series overview ===
Season	Episodes	Originally released	
Season	Episodes	First released	Last released
1	12	October 1, 2017	December 17, 2017
2	12	October 13, 2018	December 22, 2018
3	14	December 7, 2019	March 7, 2020

=== Season 1 (2017) ===
No. overall	No. in season	Title	Original release date	U.S. viewers (millions)
1	1	"Carlsbad, New Mexico"	October 1, 2017	0.34
Murder of Emily Lambert
2	2	"Waterloo, Iowa"	October 8, 2017	0.30
Double murder of Anissa Schroeder and Ronald Scullark
3	3	"Baton Rouge, Louisiana"	October 15, 2017	0.31
Sean Vincent Gillis
4	4	"Edmonton"	October 22, 2017	0.38
Murder of Beverly Parker
5	5	"Martin County, Florida"	October 29, 2017	0.29
Murder of Tricia Todd in Hobe Sound, Florida
6	6	"Placentia, California"	November 5, 2017	0.33
Murder of Lynsie Ekelund
7	7	"Gainesville, Florida"	November 18, 2017	0.38
Murder of Christian Aguilar
8	8	"Eunice, New Mexico"	November 19, 2017	0.35
Murder of Darrell Blagg
9	9	"Boone County, Iowa"	November 26, 2017	0.36
Murder of Michael Shane Hill in Ogden, Iowa
10	10	"Houston"	December 3, 2017	0.41
Murder of Michelle Warner
11	11	"Seneca Falls, New York"	December 10, 2017	0.36
Karl Karlsen
12	12	"Ascension Parish, Louisiana"	December 17, 2017	0.34
Daniel Blank

=== Season 2 (2018) ===
No. overall	No. in season	Title	Original release date	U.S. viewers (millions)
13	1	"Mountain City, Tennessee"	October 13, 2018	0.31
Double murder of Billy Payne and Billie Jean Hayworth
14	2	"Largo, Florida"	October 13, 2018	0.30
Murder of Patricia King
15	3	"Belmont County, Ohio"	October 20, 2018	0.30
Murder of Brad McGarry in Bellaire, Ohio
16	4	"Marion County, Florida"	October 27, 2018	0.33
Murder of Heather Strong
17	5	"Jackson County, Wisconsin"	November 3, 2018	0.26
Murder of Alisha Sidie
18	6	"Midland, Texas"	November 10, 2018	0.39
Murder of Kathy Lujan
19	7	"Palestine, Texas"	November 17, 2018	0.32
Murder of Jerod Lee Evans
20	8	"King County, Washington"	November 24, 2018	0.35
Gary Ridgway
21	9	"Renton, Washington"	December 1, 2018	0.29
Murder of Kathy Chou
22	10	"Tazewell, Virginia"	December 8, 2018	0.33
Double murder of Valerie and Harvey Looney
23	11	"Canton, Pennsylvania"	December 15, 2018	0.27
Murder of Carol Hickok
24	12	"Grove City, Ohio"	December 22, 2018	0.34
Murder of Reagan Tokes

=== Season 3 (2019–20) ===
No. overall	No. in season	Title	Original release date	U.S. viewers (millions)
25	1	"Chris Watts"	December 7, 2019	0.28
Triple murder of Shanann Watts, Bella Watts and Celeste Watts in Frederick, Colorado
26	2	"Vanished in the Night"	December 14, 2019	0.29
Murder of Naomi Miller
27	3	"A Killer App"	December 21, 2019	0.31
2016 Kalamazoo shootings
28	4	"She Never Came Home"	December 28, 2019	0.32
Murder of Kenia Monge in Denver
29	5	"The Kill Club"	January 4, 2020	0.28
Murder of Dwite Morgan in Edmond, Oklahoma
30	6	"Killer Friends"	January 11, 2020	0.24
Murder of Patty Dresser in Greenfield, Indiana
31	7	"Who Killed Little Mama?"	January 18, 2020	0.35
Murder of Ethel Adamson in Clarksville, Tennessee
32	8	"The Worst Betrayal"	January 25, 2020	0.31
Murder of Alexis Oesterle in Rockport, Indiana
33	9	"His Final Fight"	February 1, 2020	0.30
Murder of Paul Quandt Sr.in Gainesville, Florida
34	10	"Not My DNA"	February 8, 2020	0.36
Murder of Genai Coleman in Duluth, Georgia
35	11	"Professional Suspect"	February 15, 2020	0.35
Murder of Sara Dixon in Graham, North Carolina
36	12	"Two Fires, One Victim"	February 22, 2020	0.33
Murder of Amanda Smith in Salisbury, North Carolina
37	13	"A Helpful Witness"	February 29, 2020	0.33
Murder of Kim Allen in Smyrna, Tennessee
38	14	"Cold Justice Confessions"	March 7, 2020	0.41
Murder of Evelyn “Laverne” Mackey in Brooksville, Florida
