= Frederick High School =

Frederick High School may refer to:

- Frederick High School (Colorado), Frederick, Colorado
- Frederick High School (Maryland), Frederick, Maryland
- Frederic High School, Frederic, Wisconsin
