= Murder of Reagan Tokes =

2017 abduction, rape and murder that led to the "Reagan Tokes Act" in Ohio

- Location: Scioto Grove Metro Park, Grove City, Ohio
- Date: February 8, 2017; 9 years ago c. 11:50 pm – 12:00 am EST
- Attack type: Murder by gunshot, kidnapping, robbery, and rape
- Victims: Reagan Delaney Tokes, aged 21
- Perpetrator: Brian Lee Golsby
- Verdict: Guilty on all counts
- Convictions: Capital murder
- Sentence: Life in prison without the possibility of parole
- Website: https://rdtmf.com/

The murder of Reagan Tokes occurred on the night of February 8, 2017, in the Scioto Grove Metro Park in Grove City, Ohio. Tokes, a twenty-one-year-old student at Ohio State University, was abducted by Brian Golsby while leaving her job in Columbus’s downtown. Golsby robbed and raped Tokes, and forced her to drive to the Scioto Grove Metro Park. There, he forced her to strip naked and marched her into a field where he shot her twice in the head just shortly before midnight. Her body was found the following morning.

Golsby had recently been released from prison where he had served a six-year sentence for kidnapping a pregnant woman and her child and raping the woman. He had pled down to robbery and attempted rape. He was staying at a temporary housing program. The officials at the housing program and his parole officer did not monitor him, and he violated probation and committed six robberies without being arrested before murdering Tokes.

Golsby was convicted in March 2018 and sentenced to life in prison though prosecutors filed a cross-appeal, arguing that a legal error prevented him from getting the death penalty. In 2019 prosecutors were granted the authority to appeal. Oral arguments in front of Ohio's Tenth District Court of Appeals were held on July 30, 2020. In September, the appeals court ruled that prosecutors could not continue to pursue the death penalty. Under former Franklin County District Attorney Ron O'Brien, the state appealed the decision and the Supreme Court of Ohio accepted the case. However, under newly elected District Attorney Gary Tyack, the state's appeal was withdrawn.

The murder of Tokes received extensive media coverage in Central Ohio and was listed as one of region's top ten news stories in 2017 by The Columbus Dispatch. The case has received national attention as well, being featured on programs such as Dateline NBC and On the Case with Paula Zahn. It was also featured on an episode of Criminal Confessions on the Oxygen Network. Tokes's murder has also led to calls for changes in Ohio’s criminal justice system. In 2018 Governor John Kasich signed part of the Reagan Tokes Act into law. Tokes's family sued the Ohio Department of Rehabilitation and Correction (ODRC) and NISRE Inc., the company whose program housed Golsby, arguing that their negligence and failure to monitor him led to Tokes's murder. Several courts dismissed the lawsuit against the ODRC and the Supreme Court of Ohio declined to hear the Tokes' case against the department. The lawsuit against NISRE Inc. remained pending, and a trial was set to begin in 2020. The lawsuit was later settled.

== Background ==
=== Reagan Tokes ===
Reagan Delaney Tokes was born on March 13, 1995, in Edgewood, Kentucky, United States, to parents Toby Tokes and Lisa McCrary-Tokes. She had a younger sister, Makenzie. She was raised in Maumee, Ohio, in Monclova Township, and graduated from Anthony Wayne High School where she had a 4.5 GPA and played on the varsity lacrosse and tennis teams. The year she began college her parents and sister moved to Florida, leaving Tokes in Ohio to begin attending The Ohio State University. Tokes had wanted to attend OSU since she was a child. She originally majored in pre-med but changed her major to psychology. She planned on graduating in May 2017 and moving to Cleveland, where she had hoped to work at the Cleveland Clinic. Tokes also planned to attend graduate school, get another degree in psychology and open up her own psychology practice. Days before being murdered, she posted on social media about picking out a frame for her diploma. Tokes worked at Bodega, a restaurant and bar in Columbus's Short North neighborhood.

=== Brian Golsby ===
Brian Lee Golsby was born on January 26, 1988. He says that he had an abusive mother and was affected by drug and alcohol abuse. He also claims to have experienced a rape in his youth, although prosecutors dispute this as the stories he gave were inconsistent. Golsby started committing crimes as a juvenile. These crimes include criminal trespassing, receiving stolen property, theft, shoplifting, criminal damaging, and threatening his mother with a knife. According to a juvenile sex offender assessment filed by the Ohio Department of Youth Services, Golsby raped five-year-old girls and six-year-old boys, and was a member of the Crips gang during his youth.

In November 2010, Golsby abducted a woman who was eight months pregnant, together with her two-year-old son. As the adult victim was getting her child out of her car, he came up behind her and put a knife to her throat. Police say he also threatened the child's life. Golsby orally raped the woman in front of the child and forced her to drive him to several ATMs to withdraw money. He then forced her to drive him to her home where he again orally raped her and stole her DVD-player. The victim refused to testify, fearing for her and her children's lives, so Golsby pleaded down to robbery and attempted rape in May 2011. He was sentenced to six years in prison for the robbery charge and six years for the attempted rape charge. The sentences ran concurrently, meaning that he would be incarcerated for a total of six years rather than twelve years. The six months he had spent in jail prior to the plea bargain counted as a part of his six-year sentence, so instead of being released six years after the plea, in May 2017, he was released five and a half years afterward, in November 2016.

While in prison, Golsby committed fifty-two infractions, including possessing contraband, refusing to obey orders, stealing, fighting, and creating disturbances. His behavior was so problematic that he was shifted to different penitentiaries several times. He ended up serving his sentence in five different prisons. He was released on November 13, 2016, and had to register as a Tier III sex offender.

Upon release, Golsby was given a GPS tracking device by a re-entry program for ex-offenders, called Alvis. Alvis did not actively monitor him. Golsby could not be placed in Alvis's re-entry program due to his criminal history and his history of violence while in prison. He was placed at a temporary housing center that was run by the EXIT Program. Like Alvis, officials working for the EXIT Program did not monitor him. They allowed him to come and go as he wanted and did not check his whereabouts. His only limitation was to be at the housing center between 10:00 pm and 6:00 am. According to the EXIT Program's founder, Golsby had a pass to leave the house during what he claimed were his work hours. Golsby's parole officer did not monitor him either. Golsby violated parole several times and committed six robberies without being sent to jail or prison. The parole violations, which included letting the battery on his GPS bracelet die as well as spending several nights away from the Exit Program's housing center, were considered "non-severe" and did not warrant immediate sanctions.

The robberies Golsby committed include:

- January 24 – Robbing a woman of $3 at knifepoint.
- January 27 – Robbing a woman for some gift cards.
- February 1 – Robbing a man and taking $20.
- February 2 – Abducting a man and forcing him to drive to an ATM at gunpoint. He then robbed the man of $500.
- February 6 – Pistol whipping a woman, and taking $38.
- February 7 – Robbing a woman, taking her purse and bag.

After his third violation, a hearing was scheduled for February 23, which could have resulted in returning him to prison.

== The crime ==
On the evening of February 8, 2017, Tokes went to work at Bodega in downtown Columbus, Ohio. Golsby spent the evening roaming Columbus looking for a victim. GPS data shows that he walked around OSU's campus and to North High Street. At North High Street, he got on a COTA bus and traveled to the downtown. He then spent about an hour walking around in circles near Bodega.

At about 9:45 PM Tokes left Bodega and walked to her car. She ran into Golsby, who forced her into her car at gunpoint and abducted her. During his interrogation, Golsby said he told Tokes that all he wanted was money and that everything would be all right. Golsby forced Tokes to drive him to two ATMs to withdraw money, but the transactions were declined. They stopped at the first ATM, a Chase Bank, at 10:02, and tried to withdraw $500. Twelve minutes later, at 10:14, they stopped at a Huntington Bank.

At 10:18 Tokes and Golsby arrived in an alley, and stayed there for twelve minutes. This is where Golsby is believed to have raped Tokes. A rape kit performed on Tokes's body would later show that Golsby had raped her. After the rape, Golsby made Tokes drive back to the first ATM, and forced her to withdraw $60. Tokes and Golsby also stopped at two gas stations, a Sunoco station at 11:12 and a Turkey Hill station at 11:41.

Golsby decided to murder Tokes to prevent her from reporting the crimes he had committed against her. In his interrogation, he admitted that she begged for her life, telling him “all I want to do is live.” Prosecutors believe that Tokes complied with her kidnapper's commands in order to survive. Golsby made her drive to the Scioto Grove Metro Park. There, he had her park the car and take off all of her clothing, including her shoes. He then marched Tokes into a field and shot her twice in the head. One shot was to the back of her head, and the other through the left side of her face. Golsby shot her at close range, killing her execution-style.

After murdering Tokes, Golsby took her silver Acura TL to his girlfriend's home. Golsby and his girlfriend went to McDonald's together at 1:45 AM. Golsby gave her Tokes's black Kate Spade purse and white wallet as a gift. He later disposed of the gun and shell casings in a sewer, and unsuccessfully tried to set Tokes's car on fire in order to destroy evidence.

== Criminal proceedings ==
Brian Golsby
- Born: January 26, 1988 (age 38)
- Conviction: 1 count of aggravated murder 1 count of kidnapping 1 count of rape 7 counts of aggravated robbery 2 counts of tampering with evidence 1 weapons charge
- Penalty: Life imprisonment without parole

Details
- Victims: Reagan Tokes + several others
- Span of crimes: 2010–2017
- Date apprehended: February 11, 2017
- Imprisoned at: Ohio State Penitentiary, Youngstown, Ohio

=== Investigation ===
Before being kidnapped, while Tokes was at Bodega, she texted her father saying that she would call him after she left work. When Tokes failed to call, her parents became worried. They spent the night trying to call and text her but got no answer. At around 2:00 AM Tokes's phone died. On February 9, her parents learned that she had not attended her classes. A missing person report was filed and news of her disappearance was spread via social media.

The day after Tokes's murder, a park-goer discovered her naked body and called the police. A tattoo and a necklace helped detectives identify the victim. Tokes's body was later officially identified by her uncle who lived nearby. A forensic pathologist later testified at trial that two bullets were recovered from Tokes's head during an autopsy. The pathologist also said that one of the gunshot wounds Tokes suffered was fired at close range, which is supported by another forensic pathologist's testimony that her DNA was inside the barrel of the gun.

A digital reader that was likely attached to a commercial vehicle captured the front license plate of Tokes's car after Golsby abandoned it. The information gathered was put into a database that police later accessed. Investigators then found the car in southeast Columbus. In the back of the car and on the ground next to it were cigarette butts with Golsby's DNA. Also inside the car was a gas can. Detectives found that a similar one had been purchased the night of Tokes's murder; they later obtained a photograph of Golsby buying it. Golsby's GPS bracelet placed him in the locations Tokes had been – in the street where she parked her car, at the ATMs, and at the park. Along with the cigarette butts, more DNA evidence against Golsby came from the rape kit performed on Tokes's body. Gunshot residue was also found on Golsby's clothing.

=== Arrest ===
Golsby was arrested on February 11 at around 4:00 AM by SWAT officers; at the precinct, he was interrogated by Detective Rick Forney. Golsby confessed to forcing Tokes to drive to ATMs to make withdrawals as well as forcing her to drive to the park. He told detectives that once they were at the park he ordered Tokes to get out of the car and undress, and then left her there. He initially denied both having had sexual contact with her as well as having had a gun. Detectives then devised a new strategy. They suggested to Golsby that he must have had an accomplice. Golsby then made up a story where a man named "T.J." demanded money from him and told him he would harm his children if he didn't give him any. He said that T.J. forced him to rape Tokes at gunpoint. "I wanted to just run and call the cops, for real. I could have, but at the same time, I didn't want to put my babies in jeopardy," Golsby told detectives. At the park, "T.J." forced Tokes to undress and shot her in the head. Though detectives knew Golsby was lying about the accomplice, they pretended to believe him. While in jail, Golsby confessed to a friend and to the mother of his child that he murdered Tokes.

=== Trial ===
Jury selection for the trial began on February 23, 2018. Defense attorneys had requested a change of venue due to the extensive media coverage surrounding the case, but Judge Mark Serrott denied it. The trial began on March 5, 2018. Franklin County District Attorney Ron O’Brien told jurors in his opening statement that Tokes experienced a “night of terror” and that she was “a psychology major who never made it to graduation because she was executed at point-blank range by a handgun.” On the second day, jurors were given a tour of where Tokes went the night of her murder, including Bodega and the Scioto Grove Metro Park. They viewed crime scene photos and heard from the witness who discovered Tokes's body, and from a detective as well. They also heard from three of Tokes's roommates, who testified about the night she went missing; they also identified the Kate Spade purse Golsby had stolen from her. On March 7, jurors heard from the ex-girlfriend to whom Golsby had given Tokes's purse, along with an Ohio Bureau of Criminal Investigation agent and an Adult Parole Authority employee. On March 8, prosecutors showed a video of Golsby's interrogation by Detective Forney. In addition to the video, Detective Forney took the stand as a witness.

On the final day of trial, forensic scientists testified that Golsby's sperm was found in Tokes's body and that Tokes's DNA was inside the gun barrel. Both Golsby's friend and the mother of his child also testified about his confessions to them. Franklin County deputy coroner Dr. Donald Pojman described the two gunshot wounds Tokes suffered, one of which was the result of a pistol being pressed to her temple. During closing arguments, prosecutors argued that Golsby murdered Tokes to avoid being caught. Defense counsel argued in their closing arguments that Golsby was not smart enough to plan Tokes's murder and instead killed her as a result of panic.

Golsby was convicted on all counts on March 13, which would have been Tokes's twenty-third birthday. When it came to determining the penalty, the jury could not agree. Four voted for life in prison and eight voted for death. Judge Mark Serrott sentenced Golsby to life in prison on March 21. During the sentencing, Serrott told Golsby that his life was spared because of his upbringing yet Tokes's life wasn't. "Reagan did nothing wrong, whatsoever, and yet she forfeited her life because of your background. You get spared because of your background, and yet she forfeited her life." After being sentenced to life in prison, he pleaded guilty to six robberies that occurred before Tokes's murder. Golsby is currently incarcerated at the Ohio State Penitentiary, a supermax prison in Youngstown.

=== Appeals ===
Golsby's appellate lawyers requested an appeal in 2018 soon after his conviction but decided to drop it. Franklin County District Attorney Ron O'Brien continued to seek the death penalty for Golsby. In 2018 O'Brien filed a fifty-three-page motion, along with over one-hundred pages of exhibits, requesting a cross-appeal. O’Brien and other prosecutors argued that a legal error allowed Golsby to escape the death penalty. They claimed that during the penalty phase of Golsby's trial, Judge Serrott erred in his instructions to the jury by telling them that the defense had no burden of proof when introducing mitigating factors. According to prosecutors, this error meant that jurors considered mitigating factors presented by the defense that had never in fact happened. For example, prosecutors disputed Golsby's claim that he had experienced a rape as a child because he changed his story several times. At some points, he claimed he was ten years old when the rape occurred; other times, he claimed he was twelve years old at the time, on other occasions, he claimed to be age thirteen. Prosecutors said that he also gave inconsistent information about the location of the rape, saying that it happened in a store, behind a store, and on the street. O’Brien and Steven Taylor, the chief of his appellate division, wrote in their request that “there were ample reasons to pursue the death penalty” and that Golsby is a "remorseless recidivist violent offender prone to rape and robbery and now aggravated murder.” They said that “given the many crimes committed by the defendant (Golsby), the life-without-parole sentence for the aggravated murder can be viewed as a failure of justice that warrants correction upon showing of legal error." In January 2019, O'Brien and Taylor asked the appeals court to expedite the appeal. In February 2019, during a pre-trial hearing for another capital murder defendant, O'Brien mentioned the appeals court delay, saying the court “has done zero on it.” On April 30, 2019, Ohio's Tenth District Court of Appeals granted the State's authority to appeal. On July 30, 2020, oral arguments were made in front of Ohio's Tenth District Court of Appeals. On September 29, the appeals court ruled that Judge Serrott's instructions had been proper. Prosecutors appealed the decision. In January 2021, the Ohio Supreme Court announced that it had accepted the case. However, under newly elected District Attorney Gary Tyack, the state's appeal was withdrawn and the Ohio Supreme Court dismissed the case.

== Aftermath ==
=== Memorial and legacy ===
Tokes's funeral was held on February 14, 2017, at the Maumee United Methodist Church. She was buried at Fort Meigs Cemetery in Perrysburg, Ohio.

Tokes's family started the Reagan Tokes Memorial Foundation after her death. The foundation works to reward students with scholarships, teach self-defense, and promote legislation aimed at reducing crime.

Tokes, who would have graduated from The Ohio State University with a degree in psychology in May 2017, was awarded a posthumous degree. On May 7, during OSU's graduation ceremony, Tokes's parents and sister accepted the award from then-president Michael V. Drake.

Tokes's family held a letter and spoke during the ceremony on the behalf:

Reagan Delaney Tokes wanted to be a Buckeye ever since she was a little girl. Today her dream became a reality as she was awarded a diploma from The Ohio State University. As her parents and family, we are so proud of her and her accomplishment. It is heartbreaking that she was not able to accept the diploma herself but we are so grateful to the University for presenting it to us to accept for her.

The opportunity for a college education is a gift. Along with this gift one must also have desire, dedication, discipline and determination. Reagan had all of this and then some and so did all the other students today who received their diploma. We congratulate them on their achievement and ask that they take their gift and use it to make a difference in this world, make it a better place as Reagan wanted to do but now isn’t able to do so physically.

She has made a difference in this world however and her spirit all around us continues to do so. She has inspired so many to get involved, to bring about change, to love and care for one another and most importantly to restore and reaffirm their love for God. Love is ultimately the only thing that matters and love never fades away or dies. Love is also the most important ingredient of success. Without it, life echoes emptiness. With it, life vibrates warmth and meaning. Even in hardship, love shines through. The love we have for our daughter allows us to celebrate her accomplishment today and to find the strength to continue to live our lives and try to make a difference in this world ourselves. Love overcomes everything including evil.

Once again our family has been so blessed by tremendous generosity and kindness the entire community has showered upon us this visit to Columbus. We are so humbly grateful for all the generous contributions and gestures that have been done for us and our family. Our hearts are constantly being replenished by all these acts of love.

Shortly after Tokes's murder, a rock garden memorial was created for her in the Scioto Grove Metro Park. It was dismantled by Columbus Metro Parks authority in May 2018. A new tranquility garden in Tokes's memory was created by the park and was officially dedicated to her on June 5, 2019. It includes two large swings, paved paths, and over one-thousand plants including beebalm, boxwood, and five Buckeye trees to celebrate Tokes's connection to The Ohio State University. The garden also has a Celtic symbol for love and a pond with birds and frogs. The plaque for the park has Tiffany Blue, Tokes's favorite color, and says "In memory of a life so beautifully lived and a heart so deeply loved." When viewed from above, the garden resembles an angel. "Knowing this (the park) is here, even though we live a long, long ways away in Florida, this is going to make us be a little bit more at peace with this place where... where Reagan just wanted to live," Tokes's father said during the dedication ceremony. Tokes's mother told the local news that she “used to have this crushing sensation where I almost couldn’t breathe when we would pull in (to the park) and I don’t feel that any longer." McCrary-Tokes also said that “the pain and the tragedy never goes away, and we carry that with us every day. But we need to keep moving forward and there is still an amazing, beautiful world out there, and we have to learn how to move forward. And we carry her with us in our hearts every day and that will never change.”

Another memorial was created for Tokes on The Ohio State University campus in June 2018. A yellow magnolia tree and a bronze plaque bearing her name are on the north edge of Mirror Lake.

=== Civil litigation ===
In May 2018, the Tokes family filed a lawsuit against the Ohio Department of Rehabilitation and Correction (ODRC) and NISRE Inc., which is the parent company of the EXIT Program that housed Golsby. The lawsuit argues that the ODRC and the EXIT Program were negligent and failed to adequately monitor Golsby, leading to Tokes's murder. “For two hours prior to her death, Reagan Tokes was kidnapped and brutally raped. During this time she suffered conscious pain and suffering. The suffering of Reagan Tokes was the result of the negligence of NISRE/Exit program.” The lawsuit also states that the Tokes family has suffered “grave mental anguish.” The lawsuit against the ODRC was dismissed by Judge Patrick McGrath in September 2018, with McGrath saying that the ODRC had no duty to prevent Golsby from harming Tokes because they had no special relationship with her. The Tokeses then appealed McGrath's decision. The lawsuit was again dismissed by Ohio's Tenth District Court of Appeals.

On May 21, 2019, the Tokes family appealed to the Supreme Court of Ohio. The lawsuit says that the ODRC was "indeed aware Golsby posed a 'substantial risk of harm to others' and ignored it." It also says that a special relationship existed between the ODRC and Golsby because of their knowledge that he represented a substantial risk of harm to others and that the ODRC had the ability to control him. "DRC was literally tied to Golsby's ankle. DRC had the full mantle of control over Golsby with the ultimate power to arrest him or impose more restrictive terms of post-release control." Ohio's Supreme Court announced on August 6, 2019, that they would not hear the Tokes family's case against the ODRC. The justices voted six to one not to accept it, with Justice Michael P. Donnelly dissenting.

The Tokes family's lawsuit against NISRE Inc., however, remained pending in the Franklin County Common Pleas Court. The trial was set to begin in 2020. The lawsuit was later settled.

=== Legal reforms ===
Tokes's parents began working with lawmakers to address what they see as the systemic failures that led to her murder. In 2018, the Reagan Tokes Act was introduced in the Ohio House and Senate. In December 2018, part of the Reagan Tokes Act was signed into law by Governor John Kasich.

The portion of the Reagan Tokes Act that became law in 2018 requires judges to sentence offenders responsible for class one and two felonies (which are the most serious felonies in Ohio) to a range of years in prison consisting of a minimum term and a maximum term. If the offender is being sentenced for a single offense, the maximum term is 150% of the minimum term. For example, if a judge imposes a minimum term of four years, the maximum term would be 150% of four years, which is six years. If the offender is given several terms to be served concurrently or consecutively, the maximum sentence is 150% of the longest minimum term for the most serious felony for which they are being sentenced.

Under the Reagan Tokes Act, offenders are presumed to be released at the end of the minimum term. To extend the prison term, the ODRC must hold an administrative hearing and find that the inmate engaged in improper conduct and is a continued threat to society, was placed in extended restrictive housing, and/or was classified as a level three, four, five or higher security level. In a written statement, State Rep. Kristin Boggs said: “This legislation is the first step to make Ohio safer by ensuring that the most violent offenders who have demonstrated while in prison that they continue to pose a danger to society, are not automatically released back into our neighborhoods.”

The act also allows the ODRC to reduce an offender's sentence by five to fifteen percent for exceptional conduct or adjustment to incarceration with approval from a sentencing court. The ODRC can recommend that an inmate's sentence be reduced, whereupon a judge would be required to hold a hearing about that recommendation. The prosecuting attorney must be notified of the hearing. The prosecutor is to then notify the victim of the inmate, who has the right to participate in the hearing. The judge can overturn the ODRC's decision, and if the judge does grant the offender a reduced sentence, the victim and the prosecutor's office must be notified. Under the act, sex offenders cannot receive reduced sentences. The act also calls on the ODRC to write a feasibility study on ways to reduce the number of prisoners who are released homeless and improve GPS monitoring. The Reagan Tokes Act went into effect on March 21, 2019.

After the first part of the Reagan Tokes Act passed, lawmakers were expected to re-introduce the other components of it in 2019. The next section of the Reagan Tokes Act, which addresses the monitoring of criminals, was re-introduced at the Ohio Statehouse. House Bill 166 would reduce the caseload burdens on parole officers and require the state to create a re-entry program for all offenders released from prison who it intends to have reside in, but who are not accepted by, a halfway house or similar facility. It also addressed the GPS monitoring of felons under post-release control. In February 2022, HB 166 passed the Ohio House.

=== Challenges to the Reagan Tokes Act ===
In November 2019, Hamilton County Common Pleas Judge Tom Heekin ruled that provisions of the Reagan Tokes Act that allow the state parole board to extend prison sentences without a judge's input violate the separation of powers doctrine and deprive offenders of adequate due process. Parts of the Reagan Tokes Act have been challenged by defendants, leading to conflicting decisions by appellate courts. The Fifth District Court of Appeals and the Sixth District Court of Appeals ruled that the law's constitutionality could only be challenged if the ODRC imposes the longer sentence. The Second District Court of Appeals and the Twelfth District Court of Appeals, however, did consider the constitutionality of the law. In both cases, the courts upheld the Reagan Tokes Act.

In January 2021, the Ohio Supreme Court announced that it had accepted appeals of the decisions made by the Fifth District Court of Appeals and the Sixth District Court of Appeals. It upheld the law in a 5-2 decision in July 2023.

=== Media coverage ===
Tokes's murder and the subsequent legal reforms garnered extensive media coverage in Central Ohio. The Columbus Dispatch listed the case as being one of the region's top ten news stories in 2017. The murder of Tokes also received national media coverage. Dateline NBC aired an episode about it in June 2019. The case was also featured on On the Case with Paula Zahn and True Crime Daily. It was also featured on an episode of Criminal Confessions on the Oxygen Network and an episode of Killer Cases on A&E.

== See also ==
- List of kidnappings
