= Matt McChesney =

American football player (born 1981)

No. 95, 60
- Position: Guard

Personal information
- Born: November 6, 1981 (age 45); Santa Cruz, California, U.S.
- Listed height: 6 ft 4 in (1.93 m)
- Listed weight: 307 lb (139 kg)

Career information
- High school: Niwot (Niwot, Colorado)
- College: Colorado
- NFL draft: 2005: undrafted

Career history
- St. Louis Rams (2005)*; New York Jets (2005–2008); → Frankfurt Galaxy (2007); Miami Dolphins (2008); Denver Broncos (2009)*; (2010)*
- * Offseason or practice squad member only

Awards and highlights
- All-NFL Europa (2007); Derek Singleton Award (2004)

Career NFL statistics
- Games played: 4
- Stats at Pro Football Reference

Matthew McChesney (born November 6, 1981) is an American former professional football player who was a guard in the National Football League (NFL). He played high school football at Niwot High School and went on to play college football for the Colorado Buffaloes. He was signed by the St. Louis Rams as an undrafted free agent in 2005.

McChesney also played for the New York Jets, Miami Dolphins and Denver Broncos.

== Professional career ==
Pre-draft measurables
Height	Weight	40-yard dash	20-yard shuttle	Three-cone drill	Vertical jump	Broad jump	Bench press
6 ft 3 7/8 in (1.93 m)	307 lb (139 kg)	5.04 s	4.62 s	7.60 s	27.5 in (0.70 m)	8 ft 7 in (2.62 m)	21 reps
All values from Pro Day

=== St. Louis Rams ===
McChesney was signed by the St. Louis Rams as an undrafted free agent in 2005.

=== New York Jets ===
The New York Jets converted McChesney from a defensive lineman to a guard in the 2008 offseason.

=== Miami Dolphins ===
On November 7, 2008, the Miami Dolphins signed McChesney off their practice squad. He was placed on injured reserve on November 15 with a knee injury. On February 10, 2009, the Dolphins waived McChesney.

=== Denver Broncos ===
On February 12, 2009, McChesney signed with the Denver Broncos. He was placed on injured reserve on September 4.

=== Retirement ===
On May 20, 2010, McChesney announced his retirement from the NFL, following a freak golfing accident in April 2010.
