= Sean Vincent Gillis =

American serial killer

- Mugshot taken in 2004
- Born: June 24, 1962 (age 64); Baton Rouge, Louisiana, U.S.
- Other name: The Second Baton Rouge Killer
- Convictions: First degree murder (3 counts); Second degree murder
- Penalty: Life imprisonment without parole

Details
- Victims: 8
- Span of crimes: March 1994 – February 2004
- Country: United States
- State: Louisiana
- Date apprehended: April 29, 2004
- Imprisoned at: Louisiana State Penitentiary

Sean Vincent Gillis (born June 24, 1962) is an American serial killer and sex offender who murdered eight women in and around Baton Rouge, Louisiana, from 1994 until his arrest in April 2004. In his initial arrest, he was charged with three counts of first degree murder and three counts of ritualistic acts in the murders of 29-year-old Katherine Hall, 45-year-old Johnnie Mae Williams and 43-year-old Donna Bennett Johnston. Gillis confessed to the murders with little coercion and then informed investigators about five other women who he had murdered.

== Early life ==
Gillis was born June 24, 1962, in Baton Rouge and was raised in southern Louisiana. He was the son of Yvonne and Norman Gillis. His father abandoned the family soon after his birth. Gillis was raised by his mother and his grandparents.

His rap sheet began in 1980 when he was 17 years old, with minor infractions. Throughout the years he was arrested for traffic citations, DUI, possession of marijuana, and contempt of court. He committed his first known murder in 1994.

Years later after he had been arrested and convicted for some of his murders, a friend of one of his victims wrote to him. She turned his replies over to the prosecution, and some of Gillis' words made it into the news. Gillis expressed remorse for the murders, particularly regretting his mutilating the bodies, and described himself as "pure evil". Gillis also said that he sometimes committed murder without knowing why he was doing so.

== Murders ==
Gillis once claimed he began killing because of "stress". His first murder, which he confessed to after his arrest, was of 82-year-old Ann Bryan in March 1994. He intended to rape her, but became frightened when she screamed as he touched her. To stop her screaming, Gillis slit her throat and then stabbed her 50 times. He left her body there at her residence, St. James Place (an exclusive retirement home in Baton Rouge).

In May 1999, Gillis began stalking a woman he had seen jogging in the south Baton Rouge area. He spent three weeks driving around the area looking for her. Around 5:30 a.m. on May 30, 1999, a Sunday, he saw 52-year-old Hardee Schmidt jogging on Quail Run Drive. Two days later her body was found in a bayou off of Highway 61 in St. James Parish. Gillis later confessed that he hit Schmidt with his car, knocking her into a ditch. He got out and placed heavy-duty wire plastic wrap tightly around her neck and forced her into the car. He drove to a park off of Highland Road and raped her. After killing her, he put her nude corpse into the trunk of his car, a white Chevy Cavalier, and left it there until dumping it two days later.

Gillis continued killing for five more years, the murders unconnected and his presence unknown to law enforcement.

== Arrest and conviction ==
Donna Bennett Johnston, 43 years old, was Gillis' eighth and final victim. In February 2004, he raped her and strangled her with a nylon tie wrap. Gillis mutilated her body post-mortem, slashing her breasts, cutting off her left nipple, gouging out a tattoo on her right thigh, and severing her left arm at the elbow. Her body was found on February 27, 2004, in a drainage canal near Ben Hur Road, south of Louisiana State University in Baton Rouge.

In letters exchanged between Gillis and a friend of Johnston, Tammie Purpera, Gillis explained her murder and even expressed remorse:

She was so drunk it only took about a minute and a half to succumb to unconsciousness and then death. Honestly, her last words were "I can't breathe". I still puzzle over the post mortem dismemberment and cutting. There must be something deep in my subconscious that really needs that kind of macabre action.

Tammie Purpera, who died in 2005 of complications from AIDS, turned over all of the letters to the prosecutors, and they were used at Gillis' trials.

After his arrest, police found 45 digital pictures, downloaded to his computer, of Johnston's mutilated body, as well as photos of her corpse in the trunk of his car. Many other photos were found of other victims, some of which were used at his various trials for first-degree murder. In the end, Gillis brutally raped and murdered eight women. He kept body parts in his home as souvenirs and photos to stimulate him as he remembered the murders.

In April 2004, tire tracks found near the body of Donna Bennett Johnston were used to track Gillis. The tracks were from a unique set of tires of which the Louisiana State Crime Lab was able to determine the brand, model, and type. They were able to narrow it when they found that this particular tire was only manufactured for a three-year period, which ended in 2003. Only 90 purchases of the tire had been made in the Baton Rouge area. Soon, after obtaining a DNA swab of Gillis and matching it to evidence found on some of the victims' bodies, authorities arrested Gillis on April 29, 2004. He was charged with various crimes at different times as investigators worked to find evidence to support his confession to the other murders.

Initially, he was arrested and charged for the murders of Katherine Hall, Johnnie Mae Williams, and Donna Bennett Johnston. He stood trial for these crimes on July 21, 2008, and he was found guilty and sentenced to life in prison after the jury deadlocked in the penalty phase.

The previous year, he pleaded guilty to second-degree murder and was convicted in the killing of 36-year-old Joyce Williams. Gillis is currently incarcerated at Louisiana State Penitentiary.

== Victims ==
1. March 21, 1994: Ann Bryan, 81
2. January 4, 1999: Katherine Ann Hall, 29
3. May 30, 1999: Hardee Schmidt, 52
4. November 12, 1999: Joyce Williams, 36
5. January 2000: Lillian Robinson, 52
6. October 20, 2000: Marilyn Nevils, 38
7. October 9, 2003: Johnnie Mae Williams, 45
8. February 26, 2004: Donna Bennett Johnston, 43

== In the media ==
- Gillis' story was told in the Investigation Discovery series The Devil You Know in the episode "A Twisted Mind", and in another Investigation Discovery series, Dead of Night, in the episode "The Graveyard Shift".
- Gillis' case was featured on season 1, episode 14 of It Takes a Killer.
- Crime Watch Daily covered Sean Vincent Gillis in the episode "Monster in my Room," which aired in February 2018.
- In 2017 Criminal Confessions aired an episode about him and his confession.
- In 2018 CBS TV show Evidence of Evil made two episode about him and Derrick Todd Lee.
- In 2018 the TV show Murder By Numbers showed clips from his interrogation in an episode about another Louisiana serial killer, Jeffrey Guillory.
- The podcast And That's Why We Drink covered Sean Vincent Gillis in the episode "209. A Ghost's Recliner and the PTA of Covens," which aired in February 2021.
- Gillis' was the subject of the Investigation Discovery series Signs of a Psychopath, Season 3, episode 3, "Do Her Mortal Harm" which aired September 21, 2021.
- In 2021 he was portrayed by British actor Nicholas Benjamin in season six of Most Evil Killers.
- In 2022 he was profiled in the Mark of a Killer episode "The Monster".
- Also, in 2022, he was featured in a four part A&E series called "Butchers of the Bayou" along with fellow serial killer Derrick Todd Lee, who murdered in the same area as Gillis.

== See also ==
- List of serial killers in the United States
