= Vince Rafferty =

American football player (born 1961)

No. 50
- Position: Center

Personal information
- Born: August 6, 1961 (age 65); Manhattan, Kansas, U.S.
- Listed height: 6 ft 4 in (1.93 m)
- Listed weight: 285 lb (129 kg)

Career information
- High school: Longmont
- College: Colorado
- NFL draft: 1984: undrafted

Career history
- Dallas Cowboys (1984)*; Denver Broncos (1985)*; Green Bay Packers (1987); Phoenix Cardinals (1988)*
- * Offseason or practice squad member only

Awards and highlights
- Second-team All-Big Eight (1981)

Career NFL statistics
- Games played: 3
- Games started: 3
- Stats at Pro Football Reference

Vince Edward Rafferty (born August 6, 1961) is a former center in the National Football League (NFL) for the Green Bay Packers. He played college football at the University of Colorado Boulder.

== Early life ==
Rafferty was born Vincent Edward Rafferty, in Manhattan, Kansas. He attended Longmont High School.

He accepted a football scholarship from the University of Colorado Boulder. He began his career as an offensive guard. As a senior, he was moved to defensive tackle.

== Professional career ==
Rafferty was signed as an undrafted free agent by the Dallas Cowboys after the 1984 NFL draft. He was switched to the offensive line during training camp. He was waived on August 21, 1984.

In 1985, he signed with the Denver Broncos, but suffered an injury and never got on the field.

In 1986, he was signed by the Green Bay Packers. He was released on August 22, 1986.

On July 24, 1987, he was signed by the Packers. He was released on August 31, 1987. After the NFLPA strike was declared on the third week of the season, those contests were canceled (reducing the 16 game season to 15) and the NFL decided that the games would be played with replacement players. In September, he was signed to be a part of the Packers replacement team. He started 3 games at center during the strike. He was released on November 3, 1987.

In 1988, he was signed by the Phoenix Cardinals. He was released on August 29, 1988.

== Personal life ==
After his NFL career, Rafferty went on to become a firefighter in Colorado, working as an emergency medical technician for the Rocky Flats Fire Department.
