= Walt Clay =

American football player (1924–2013)

- Clay with Colorado, 1942

No. 85, 80, 76
- Positions: Halfback, fullback

Personal information
- Born: January 18, 1924; Erie, Colorado, U.S.
- Died: May 3, 2013 (aged 89); Northbrook, Illinois, U.S.
- Listed height: 5 ft 11 in (1.80 m)
- Listed weight: 196 lb (89 kg)

Career information
- High school: Longmont (CO)
- College: Colorado (1942)
- NFL draft: 1946: 10th round, 85th overall pick

Career history
- Chicago Rockets (1946-1947); Los Angeles Dons (1947–1949)

Career AAFC statistics
- Rushing yards: 652
- Rushing average: 3.9
- Receptions: 15
- Receiving yards: 218
- Total touchdowns: 5
- Stats at Pro Football Reference

Walter Earl Clay (January 8, 1924 – May 3, 2013) was an American professional football halfback and fullback.

Clay was born in Erie, Colorado, and attended Longmont High School in Longmont, Colorado. He played college football for Colorado.

He played professional football in the All-America Football Conference for the Chicago Rockets from 1946 to 1947 and for the Los Angeles Dons from 1947 to 1949. He appeared in 47 games, 11 as a starter, and tallied 652 rushing yards, 218 receiving yards, 148 passing yards, and five touchdowns.

Clay died in 2013 in Charlotte, North Carolina.
