= Cole Winn =

American baseball player (born 1999)

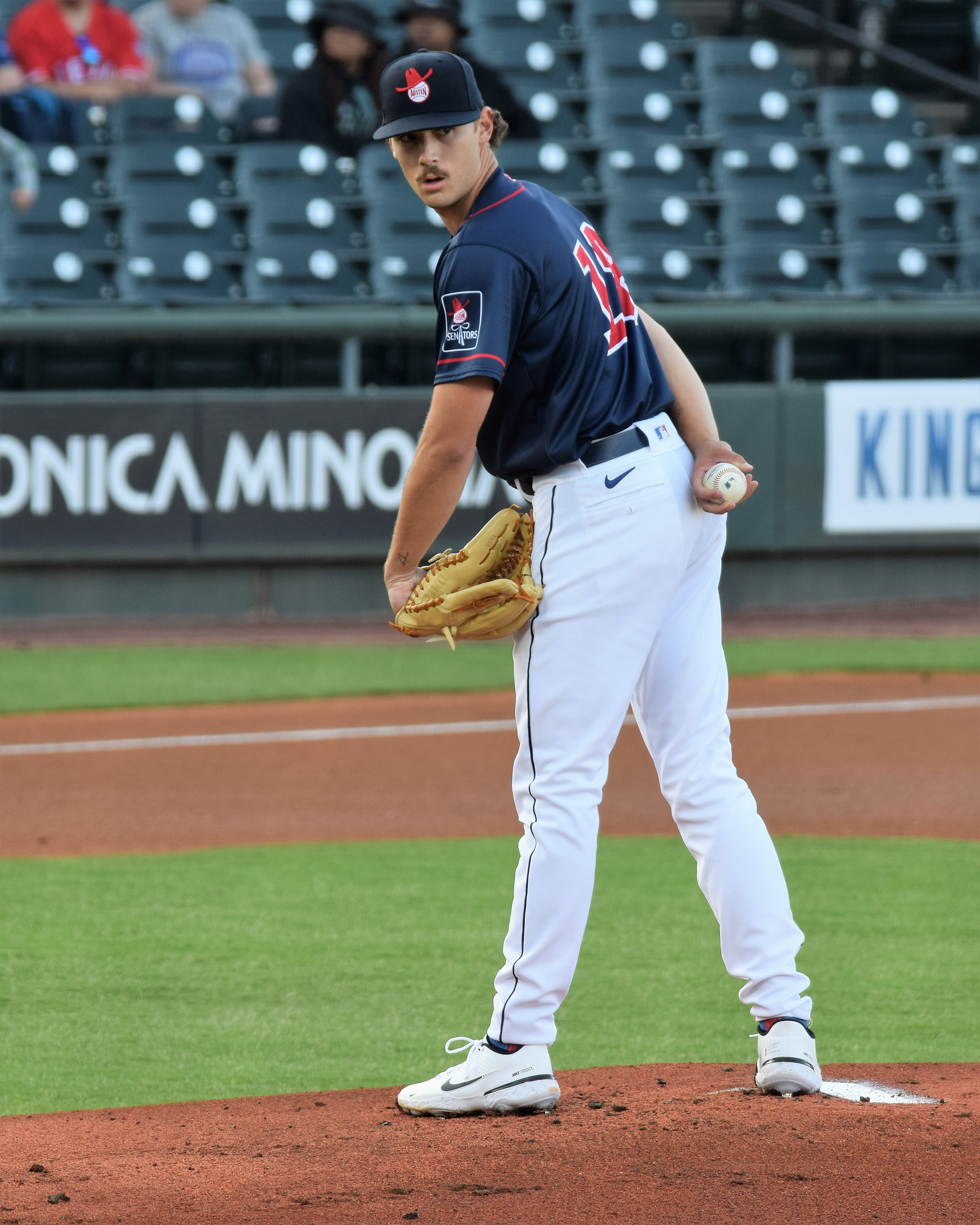
- Winn in 2022 with the Round Rock Express

Texas Rangers – No. 60
- Pitcher
- Born: November 25, 1999 (age 26); Longmont, Colorado, U.S.
- Bats: Right Throws: Right

MLB debut
- April 14, 2024, for the Texas Rangers

MLB statistics (through 2026 season)
- Win–loss record: 5–5
- Earned run average: 4.37
- Strikeouts: 98
- Stats at Baseball Reference

Teams
- Texas Rangers (2024–present)

Cole Robert Winn (born November 25, 1999) is an American professional baseball pitcher for the Texas Rangers of Major League Baseball (MLB). He made his MLB debut in 2024.

== Amateur career ==
Winn spent his freshman, sophomore, and junior years of high school at Silver Creek High School in Longmont, Colorado. As a junior in 2017 he was 9–0 with a 0.73 ERA with 95 strikeouts in 47 2/3 innings, along with batting .388 with two home runs and 19 RBIs, earning himself the title of Colorado's Gatorade Baseball Player of the Year. That summer, in July, he played in the Under Armour All-America Baseball Game at Wrigley Field.

Winn transferred to Lutheran High School of Orange County in Orange, California for his senior year. As a senior, he pitched to an 8–2 record with a 0.20 ERA and was named California's Gatorade Baseball Player of the Year and Baseball America's High School Player of the Year. He originally committed to play college baseball for the Notre Dame Fighting Irish, but decommitted and then signed to play for the Mississippi State Bulldogs.

== Professional career ==
The Texas Rangers selected Winn in the first round, with the 15th overall selection, of the 2018 Major League Baseball draft and he signed with the Rangers for a $3.15 million signing bonus. After signing, Winn did not appear in an official game with a Rangers' affiliate in the 2018 season. Instead, he took part in a new program put in place by Texas for their newly drafted high school pitchers. The "de-load" program, as the organization calls it, emphasizes building a foundation mentally and physically, while resting bodies from a strenuous senior season and pre-draft showcase circuit. The players are put through a strength program and classroom work until post-season fall instructional training starts. Winn was ranked as the #89 overall prospect in baseball by MLB Pipeline in their preseason 2019 Top 100 list. He was also ranked as the #72 overall prospect in baseball by ESPN's Keith Law in his preseason 2019 Top 100 list. He was ranked as the #78 overall prospect in baseball by Fangraphs in their preseason 2019 Top 130 list.

Winn made his professional debut in 2019 and was assigned to the Hickory Crawdads of the Single–A South Atlantic League with whom he started 18 games, compiling a 4–4 record with a 4.46 ERA over 68 2/3 innings. Winn spent 2020 at the Rangers Alternate Training Site, due to the cancellation of the season because of the COVID-19 pandemic. To begin the 2021 season, he was assigned to the Frisco RoughRiders of the Double-A Central League. In June, Winn was selected to play in the All-Star Futures Game at Coors Field. In 19 games for Frisco in 2021, Winn posted a 3–3 record with a 2.31 ERA and 97 strikeouts over 78 innings. After the end of Frisco's season in mid-September, he was promoted to the Round Rock Express of the Triple-A West where he posted a 3.38 ERA over two outings. He was named the Rangers' 2021 Nolan Ryan Pitcher of the Year. Winn spent the 2022 season back with Round Rock. Over 28 starts, he went 9–8 with a 6.51 ERA, 123 strikeouts, and 87 walks (the most in the minor leagues) over 121 2/3 innings.

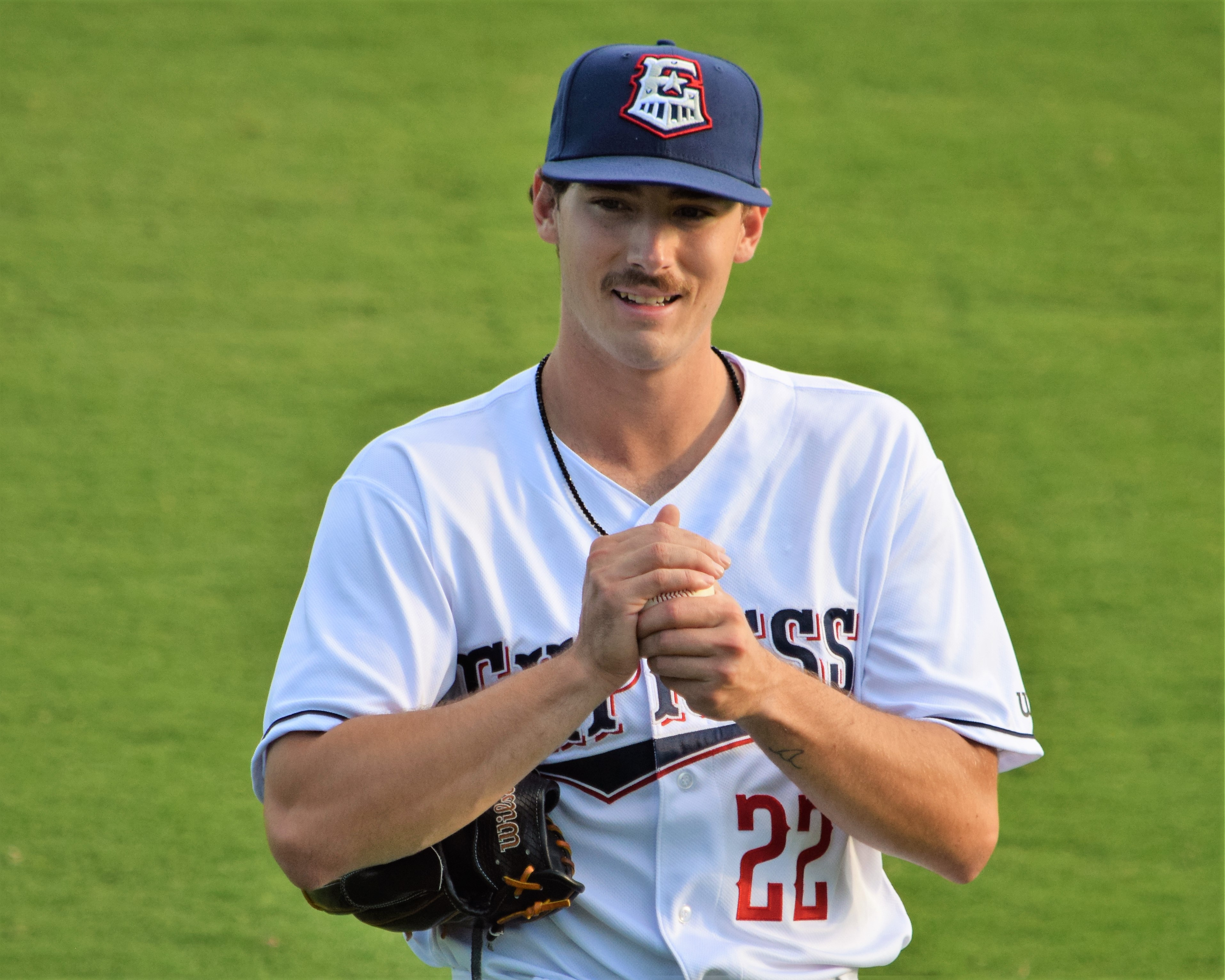
Winn with the Round Rock Express in 2023

On November 15, 2022, the Rangers selected Winn to their 40-man roster to protect him from the Rule 5 draft. Winn returned once again to Round Rock for the 2023 season, struggling to a 9–8 record with a 7.22 ERA and 97 strikeouts over 101 innings. Following that season, he played for the Criollos de Caguas of the Puerto Rican Winter League, going 2–0 with a 2.63 ERA and 24 strikeouts over 24 innings.

Winn was optioned to Triple–A Round Rock to begin the 2024 season. On April 14, 2024, Winn was promoted to the major leagues for the first time. After struggling to a 7.79 ERA in 13 games, he was placed on the injured list with right shoulder discomfort on June 24. Winn was transferred to the 60–day injured list two days later, subsequently ending his season.

Winn was optioned to Triple-A Round Rock to begin the 2025 season. The Rangers recalled Winn to the major leagues for the first time during the 2025 season on May 15. He was recalled to Texas and optioned to Round Rock various times during the season. On August 20, the Rangers placed Winn on the injured list after he experienced nerve irritation, and he was activated on September 2. He was placed back on the injured list on September 26 with a right rotator cuff strain, ending his season. Winn pitched in 33 games for the Rangers and went 0–1 with a 1.51 ERA and 35 strikeouts over 41 2/3 innings. He pitched in 17 games for Round Rock and had a 0.59 ERA.

In 2026, Winn was named to his first ever Opening Day roster with the Rangers. On March 31, he recorded his first career win after pitching 1 1/3 scoreless innings of relief against the Baltimore Orioles. He missed the last month of the season due to a right rotator cuff strain. Winn appeared in 51 games with the Rangers and had a 5–3 record, a 5.63 ERA, and 49 strikeouts across 48 innings.
