= Mead High School (Colorado) =

Location
- 12750 County Road 7 Longmont, Colorado 80504; United States; 40°11′02″N 104°59′42″W

Information
- School type: Public
- Established: 2009
- School district: St. Vrain Valley School District
- CEEB code: 060962
- Principal: Dustin Cady
- Grades: 9-12
- Colors: Orange, black, and white
- Athletics: Baseball, Basketball, Cheer, Cross Country, Dance, Football, Golf, Lacrosse (Girls), Soccer, Softball, Tennis, Track, Unified Basketball, Unified Bowling, Volleyball (Girls), Wrestling (Girls and Boys)
- Athletics conference: 4A CHSAA Conference
- Mascot: Maverick
- Website: mhs.svvsd.org

Mead High School is a high school in Longmont, Colorado, United States operated by St. Vrain Valley School District. The school opened in 2009, with only freshmen and sophomores. It then expanded to include juniors in 2010 and seniors in 2011, graduating its first senior class in spring 2012.

== School colors and mascot ==
Mead High School's colors are orange, black, and white. Its mascot, a maverick, is often depicted as a longhorn head.

== Unified Champion School ==
Mead High School has been recognized as a Special Olympics National Banner Unified Champion School, a designation awarded to schools that demonstrate a commitment to inclusion through Unified Sports and other activities. The school first received this recognition in 2019 and again in 2023, making it one of eight schools in Colorado to be honored in the 2023 class.

The Unified Sports program at Mead High School includes track, basketball, bowling, Unified Physical Education, and percussion.

In 2023, Mead High School was included on the ESPN Honor Roll of the Midwest, an annual list recognizing schools that promote inclusive practices through Unified Sports.

== Demographics ==
The demographic breakdown of the 1,174 students in the 2024-2025 school year:

- American Indian/Alaska Native: 0.43%
- Asian: 1.87%
- Native Hawaiian/Pacific Islander: 0.17%
- Hispanic: 25.81%
- Black: 0.77%
- White: 68.31%
- Two or more races: 2.64%

== Energy Academy ==
One of Mead High School's focus programs is the Mead Energy Academy, a comprehensive program that partners with energy professionals and prepares students for college studies, technical education, certification programs, and the workforce. Students engage in coursework covering a broad spectrum of energy topics and engage in real-world experiences. A key component of the Energy Academy is the Senior Capstone project, which includes job shadowing experiences facilitated through industry and community partnerships, providing hands-on learning opportunities.

Energy Academy Core Courses:

- Energy Science A & B (1 credit)
- Energy in Society A & B (1 credit)
- Internship & Capstone Project (.5 credits)
- AP Environmental Science (1 credit)
- Energy Storage & the Grid (.5 credits)

== AP Capstone Diploma School ==
Mead offers the AP Capstone™ Diploma program that distinguishes students with outstanding academic achievement and attainment of college-level academic and research skills. AP Capstone™ is a diploma program from College Board based on two yearlong AP courses: AP Seminar and AP Research. Students who earn scores of 3 or higher on the AP Seminar and AP Research Exams and on four additional AP Exams of their choosing will receive the AP Capstone Diploma™. In addition to the AP Capstone™ Diploma, Mead High School offers AP courses in every subject area. Course offerings include:

- AP Music Theory
- AP Biology
- AP Computer Science Principles
- AP Seminar
- AP Physics C
- AP Studio Art 2D
- AP Human Geography
- AP English Language and Composition
- AP Psychology
- AP Chemistry
- AP English Literature and Composition
- AP U.S. Government
- AP Calculus AB
- AP Environmental Science
- AP Comparative Government and Politics
- AP Macroeconomics
- AP Physics 1
- AP U.S. History
- AP Microeconomics
- AP Studio Art 3D
- AP Statistics

== Incidents ==
In 2021, Mead High School received national media attention after a photograph circulated online of three students appearing to reenact the murder of George Floyd. Following the incident, the school’s principal resigned.
