= Derrick Todd Lee =

American serial killer (1968–2016)

- Mug shot of Lee in 2003
- Born: November 5, 1968; St. Francisville, Louisiana, U.S.
- Died: January 21, 2016 (aged 47); Zachary, Louisiana, U.S.
- Other name: The Baton Rouge Serial Killer
- Convictions: First degree murder (1 count); Second degree murder (1 count); Assault; Burglary; Stalking; Trespassing; Voyeurism
- Penalty: Death + life imprisonment

Details
- Victims: 7+
- Span of crimes: April 18, 1998 – March 3, 2003
- Country: United States
- State: Louisiana
- Date apprehended: May 27, 2003

Derrick Todd Lee (November 5, 1968 – January 21, 2016), also known as The Baton Rouge Serial Killer, was an American serial killer and rapist who murdered at least seven women around Baton Rouge and Lafayette, Louisiana, between 1998 and 2003.

Before his murder charges, Lee had been arrested for stalking women and watching them in their homes. Despite this arrest, he initially was overlooked by police because they incorrectly believed the killer was white. Lee was linked by DNA tests to the deaths of seven women in the area in Louisiana and in 2004, he was convicted in separate trials of the murders of Geralyn DeSoto and Charlotte Murray Pace. The Pace trial resulted in a death sentence.

Newspapers suggested Lee was responsible for other unsolved murders in the area, but the police lacked DNA evidence to prove these connections. After Lee's arrest, it was discovered that another serial killer, Sean Vincent Gillis, was operating in the Baton Rouge area during the same time as Lee.

Lee spent twelve years on death row at Louisiana State Penitentiary before dying of heart disease at a hospital in 2016.

== Early life ==
=== Childhood and teenage years ===
Derrick Todd Lee, who was known by his middle name, was born in St. Francisville, Louisiana, in the northern Baton Rouge metropolitan area, as the second of two children to Samuel Ruth and Florence Lee. Samuel and Florence were living with the latter's mother at the time, and weren't married, with Samuel abandoning the family during Lee's childhood to get back with his separated wife. Samuel had a number of mental health issues, including bipolar disorder, schizophrenia and major depressive disorder, and a record for domestic violence. In 1991, Lee's father was arrested in Gretna, Louisiana, for the attempted manslaughter of his second ex-wife, after he aimed an empty gun at her and repeatedly pulled the trigger. He was found incompetent to stand trial while in jail, after officers noted his refusal to wear clothes and misuse of toilet water, resulting in him being committed to a New Orleans psychiatric ward to receive treatment for psychosis, until he was deemed rehabilitated in 1998.

Florence was seventeen years old at the time of Lee's birth and did not list Samuel as the father on the birth certificate, raising her two children along with her husband Coleman Barrow, whom she married around 1970. Lee grew up in Independence, a predominantly Black area of houses and mobile homes at a former plantation near Louisiana State Highway 965, east of St. Francisville, spending most of his childhood around maternal family who also lived there. Lee's mother was described as short-tempered and domineering, while Lee's stepfather co-parented him and his older sister whenever he was off work. Lee was known to be a restless child, described as "a hyperactive", and as Lee's mother had a strict rule about not playing inside, he spent most of his free time with neighboring relatives, thus developing a close relationship with his uncle, grandfather and cousins.

Beginning at age nine, Lee developed an unusual interest in observing others, sometimes startling Independence residents through his unmoving, still state while doing so. He made a hobby of birdwatching, but was also involved in several incidents where he was caught peeping at girls, mostly his cousins as well as his sister, through the windows of their homes. Lee remained a bedwetter until his early teens and engaged in thumb sucking until high school. He took special education classes and attended speech therapy at West Feliciana High School. IQ tests taken throughout his teenage years varied between 70 and 91 points. Lee reportedly felt embarrassment for being in special education and was regularly bullied by his peers for this. Lee regularly got into confrontations at school, with most ending without physical violence. Lee dropped out of school in the eleventh grade.

=== Marriage ===
In 1987, he and his girlfriend, Jacqueline Denise "Jackie" Sims, moved to Zachary, Louisiana, where Lee found employment as a pipefitter. He worked with the construction company he trained under until 1988, and got married the same year. Lee continued working in construction for several different employers for the next several years, either in pipefitting or as a cement truck driver, which both his biological and stepfather worked as before him. Over the following fifteen years, he worked for Exxon, Turner Industries, Formosa Plastics, and various smaller construction firms, with long periods of unemployment, including the months before his arrest.

Following the birth of his son, Derrick Todd Jr., at the end of 1988, Lee and his wife grew distant. He started keeping away from home for days on end, frequenting bars, barbecue restaurants, and bible studies around West Feliciana Parish, where he would pick up women for sex. In February 1990, Lee twisted Sims' arm during an argument and expelled her from the house, after which she filed a restraining order against him. Lee's behavior intensified after their daughter Doris was born in November 1992, when he abandoned his family shortly after the birth. Sims named him in a request for an absent parent form and after Sims prepared to file a case against him for criminal neglect of family in early 1993, Lee returned and made a brief attempt at reconciliation for a few months, but he resumed his physical abuse of Sims in June of the same year. He was imprisoned for burglary shortly after and would not keep contact with his wife or children for over two years. While Sims found out about his infidelity through rumors, she did not confront Lee about this, later stating that she "quit caring and went on with her life", though remaining unaware of his later murders.

In 1996, not long after Lee's return from prison, Lee's father-in-law died in a workplace accident during an explosion at an Amoco plant. His wife received a $250,000 settlement, which Lee appropriated and spent on expensive cars, clothes, jewelry and alcohol at bars to impress women. He used a portion of the money to buy a house and 1-acre property south of St. Francisville. Lee gambled away over $5,000 at Casino Rouge. Lee entered a stable extramarital affair with another woman, Consandra Green, whom he met at a bar in 1997. Green gave birth to his third child, Dedrick, in July 1999. By November 2002, Lee and Sims had filed for bankruptcy, after going $85,000 in debt.

== Prior criminal record ==
Lee was first arrested on November 8, 1981, aged thirteen, for breaking into a candy shop. He was convicted of simple burglary and sentenced to probation and to pay restitution to the shop. At age sixteen, Lee was arrested for attempted second-degree murder for using a knife during a fight with another teen, who was left uninjured, but the matter did not go to court. In February 1986, a relative of Lee reported him to police for repeatedly peeping through the windows of his home, as well as that of a female relative. In September 1988, Lee was convicted for unauthorized entry of an inhabited dwelling. In May 1990, Lee got into a fight with his father-in-law, leading to an arrest for disturbing the peace. The same year, Lee was questioned by police after neighbours overheard an escalating argument where Lee accused his mother of owing him money. Lee's sister also filed a complaint against her brother due to an incident in which he had removed a glass pane from her window to unlock her front door after being forbidden from coming inside.

In 1992, Lee was arrested in Zachary after he was found inside the locked home of a man with two daughters. In 1993, a pair of 15-year-olds were slashed with a bladed object while at one of Zachary's cemeteries, with Lee later being identified as the likely assailant from the description of one of the victims.

In July 1993, Lee was sentenced to four years of hard labor at East Baton Rouge Parish prison for simple burglary. He successfully filed for parole in July 1995 and moved to Lake Charles, in the western part of the state, where he was arrested two months later on a Peeping Tom offense. He was given a 120 days prison sentence, which was suspended and replaced with two years of unsupervised probation. Three weeks after the decision, Lee was arrested alongside a cousin and their friend for stealing clothes from Salvation Army donation boxes. He was initially charged with burglary and theft, but the charges were downgraded to misdemeanors.

In July 1997, in Zachary, a woman called police over a man prowling and peeping around her house. Lee was arrested at a cemetery, where one of the arresting officer recognized him from an earlier incident where he was given a ride by police when his car was found broken down outside the same grounds.

=== Stalking incidents ===
In 1999, Lee started stalking 36-year-old Collette Walker after seeing Walker at her workplace at a seafood market. On June 21, Walker was approached by Lee at a parking lot near her home in St. Francisville. Lee twice asked Walker out for a date, then asked if she could give him a ride, all of which she declined. Two days later, Lee followed Walker into her apartment and only left after getting a fake phone number. Walker said that while Lee was not openly hostile, he was insistent to meet her again and nonchalant while touching things inside her home.

On July 3, 2002, Lee sexually harassed a woman he had followed through Breaux Bridge, Louisiana. Lee had tried to pull the victim towards him by the arm while he masturbated under his clothes.

== Murders ==
=== Randi Mebruer ===
On the night of April 18–19, 1998, 28-year-old Randi Jane Mebruer (née Cieslewicz) disappeared from her home in Zachary, Louisiana. Lee had previously stalked her house several times during his nightly voyeur prowls. That night, Lee, who had been laid off from his latest job two days earlier, left his usual hangout, Liz's Lounge, after an argument with his girlfriend. Via Louisiana Highway 964, he drove to Mebruer's house and broke into her bedroom, where he attacked Mebruer, causing severe bleeding. After incapacitating her, Lee dragged Mebruer to the driveway and raped her. What Lee did with the body is unknown; her body was never found, disappearing along with her keys and a pair of five-pound dumbbells. Her disappearance was reported by her ex-husband Michael Mebruer Sr., who had arrived from Mississippi the following morning to pick up their three-year-old son, who had slept through the events.

Michael was the prime suspect, with police finding out about his alcoholism, frequent fighting with his partners, and a death threat he had made against another ex-wife who had followed his car once. Michael's girlfriend provided an alibi for the night and he was released due to a lack of evidence, receiving custody of his son, though local police continued to keep him under informal watch for years.

=== Gina Wilson Green ===
On September 23, 2001, 41-year-old Gina Wilson Green was strangled to death in her home on Baton Rouge's Stanford Avenue. Green had complained about feeling unsafe, leading her to place cans of pepper spray at each window. She had been raped and undressed in the kitchen and placed on her bed after being killed. Green's mobile phone was found several weeks later in a trash can at a nearby alley. Because the murder had occurred near Louisiana State University, there was heightened vigilance among students and staff. Green's murder was counted among a number of other killings recorded in and around Baton Rouge, although not yet linked to that of Randi Mebruer. Green's ex-husband was questioned as a suspect, as well as a painter who had issued threats against Green due to a financial dispute.

=== Geralyn Barr DeSoto ===
On the morning of January 14, 2002, 21-year-old Geralyn Barr DeSoto was fatally stabbed in her house in Addis. Lee, who had been fired from another workplace four days earlier, had asked DeSoto to let him in so he could use a phone, which he used to bludgeon DeSoto in the head from behind. DeSoto was able to flee to the bedroom and retrieve her husband's shotgun, which was not loaded, before Lee caught up to her again. Lee wrestled the gun from DeSoto, who ran for the backdoor before being repeatedly stabbed in the back and chest with a hunting knife after Lee caught up to her, dying from a slit throat. Lee stomped on her body before leaving the scene.

DeSoto's body was found by her husband, who was first held as the suspect. He had inadvertently tampered with the crime scene by getting blood on his clothes, touching the shotgun, and punching a hole in the wall in frustration, under the belief that DeSoto had committed suicide before he discovered the stab wounds on DeSoto.

Charlotte Murray Pace

=== Charlotte Murray Pace ===
On May 31, 2002, 22-year-old Charlotte Murray Pace was fatally stabbed on Baton Rouge's Sharlo Avenue. Pace had graduated Louisiana State University a week earlier as the institution's youngest MBA recipient and relocated to the new lodgings two days earlier. While her two roommates were away, Pace was attacked by Lee, who raped her and killed Pace by stabbing her 81 times with a screwdriver during a prolonged struggle. The murders of Pace and Gina Green were linked by police as they lived close to each other before Pace's move and jogged in the same park near LSU.

=== Dianne Alexander ===
On July 9, 2002, 46-year-old Dianne Alexander was attacked at her house in Breaux Bridge. Lee had knocked on Alexander's door, claiming to be doing construction for a fictitious neighboring family, and asked if she could help him find their address. Alexander did not let Lee inside, but handed him a cordless phone and a phone book to use on the entry porch through the half-opened door. While outside, Lee engaged in small talk while repeatedly asking to speak with Alexander's husband. Alexander eventually confirmed her husband wasn't home and when she went out to retrieve the items, Lee forced his way inside and began choking Alexander, brandishing a knife in his pocket. After forcing Alexander onto the living room floor, Lee set aside his knife to stimulate himself. Alexander was able to briefly grab ahold of the knife, but Lee wrestled it out of her hands. Lee used the knife to cut an electrical cord, which he then wrapped around Alexander's throat as he attempted to rape her. Because Lee failed to achieve an erection, he proceeded to repeatedly beat Alexander instead, striking her in the face and stomping her in the stomach. At this point, Alexander's adult son Herman walked into the home, alerted by his mother's shouts for help, causing Lee to relent and flee through the back of the house towards his car, taking his knife, the cut cord and Alexander's purse with him. Before losing consciousness from blood loss, Alexander was able to call emergency services while her son tried to unsuccessfully follow Lee's car in his own vehicle.

Dianne Alexander is the only known survivor of one of Lee's murder attempts, spending two days in a coma before being released after five days of treatment at Lafayette General Medical Center for a hairline fracture, lacerations to her face, as well as bruising to her back. Alexander's son immediately provided police with the details of Lee's car, a gold-colored Mitsubishi Mirage with noticeable frontal damage. On May 22, 2003, she provided a description of Lee to a FBI sketch artist.

=== Pam Kinamore ===
On July 12, 2002, 44-year-old Pamela Piglia Kinamore was murdered after being abducted from her home on Baton Rouge's Briarwood Place, shortly after returning from her antique shop in Denham Springs. Lee had entered through the unlocked front door and kidnapped Kinamore as she was sitting in the bath. After being beaten and tied-up, Kinamore was driven to the Whiskey Bay, part of the Atchafalaya Basin in Iberville Parish, where she was raped before having her throat slit, nearly beheading her. Her husband identified Kinamore's body from a golden earring, as she was otherwise too mutilated. A silver toe ring had been taken from her body by Lee, who gifted it to his wife.

Two motorists spotted Kinamore as she was driven around in Lee's truck, after she had made eye contact with them while briefly conscious. A woman on the Airline Highway recorded the licence plate while a truck driver on Interstate 10 reported the sighting via CB radio. A sperm sample was recovered from Kinamore's body, but too insufficient for a full DNA profile.

=== Dené Colomb ===
On November 21, 2002, 23-year-old Trineisha Dené Colomb was murdered after being abducted from visiting her mother's grave in Lafayette. Colomb was the only known victim to hail from outside the larger Baton Rouge area. Her car and belongings were found near Grand Coteau cemetery. Colomb was fatally bludgeoned after being raped. Colomb's body was found three days later by a hunter in a forest near Scott, Louisiana.

=== Carrie Yoder ===
On March 3, 2003, 26-year-old Carrie Lynn Yoder was murdered after being abducted from her home on Baton Rouge's Dodson Avenue. Yoder was raped and beaten before she was strangled to death. Her body was found at the Whiskey Bay ten days after her disappearance.

== Investigation ==
Lee’s police sketch

Lee's methods varied with nearly each murder. Similarities between the crimes included the removal of cell phones from the victim's belongings, and a lack of any visible signs of forced entry into the location where the victim was attacked. With the exception of the three last victims, who were killed after being taken from their residences and dumped in rural areas, the victims were found within their homes. Another one of Lee's methods was portraying himself as a homeless person knocking on citizens doors for help. Lee used the name "Anthony" when talking to victims and was usually described as well-dressed. The victims were predominantly White, with the exceptions of Dianne Alexander and Dené Colomb, who were Black.

As a result of an inaccurate FBI offender profile and erroneous eyewitness accounts, police originally believed the killer to be white. Police therefore administered thousands of DNA tests to Caucasian men in and around the general area of the murders. Having no leads, police then allowed the now defunct company DNAPrint Genomics to access DNA left at the crime scenes. DNAPrint Genomics generated an ancestry profile indicating that the suspect was 85% African, thus changing the course of the investigation. Police then knew they were searching for a black man for the January 2002 slaying of Geralyn Barr DeSoto after DNA evidence was found under DeSoto's fingernails.

Between the DNA evidence gathered from the deceased victims, a psychological profile made by Mary Ellen O'Toole and the police sketch based on Alexander's description, the police went public with the information. Police in the nearby town of Zachary, Louisiana recognized the man from a recent peeping tom incident it had investigated. Police in Zachary called the police in Baton Rouge to let them know the name of the suspected perpetrator. Additionally, the Zachary Police Department also let the Baton Rouge Police Department know that it had a DNA sample from Lee due to a prior murder investigation from six to eight months earlier. The DNA lab ran and compared the samples, and they were a match to Derrick Todd Lee. During the manhunt, John Walsh, host of America's Most Wanted, added the Baton Rouge Serial Killer to his Top 10 Fugitives of 2002 at No. 3. Lee had already fled the state on May 10, after police got Lee to submit a voluntary DNA sample, taking his children out of school before ordering them and his wife to go to Detroit for a while. Lee travelled through Michigan, Illinois and finally Georgia via bus. On May 27, after a five-day manhunt, law enforcement found him hiding at a motel in Atlanta. After two failed arrest attempts at a homeless shelter and another motel, Lee was apprehended in Atlanta's Polar Rock neighborhood. Lee waived extradition, and he was returned to Baton Rouge on five murder charges.

Besides the seven confirmed murders, Lee is also a suspect in the murders of 41-year-old Connie Lynn Warner in August 1992, and 23-year-old Christine Moore in May 2002, as well as the December 2002 disappearance of 65-year-old Mari Ann Fowler. The 1997 murder of Eugenie Boisfontaine was initially also investigated for Lee's involvement, due to the proximity to the murder of Gina Green, although found DNA evidence did not match his in 2005.

== Trials ==
In August 2004, Lee was tried for the murder of Geralyn DeSoto. Although Lee was eligible for first degree murder charges, the district attorney prosecuted Lee for murder in the second degree because DeSoto had not been sexually assaulted, which meant a first-degree murder conviction would be harder to obtain. Lee was convicted by jury and sentenced to life imprisonment without parole.

There was some argument that Derrick Lee was perhaps incompetent to stand trial. During psychiatric evaluations, he scored an average of 65 on various standardized IQ tests; a score below 69 is considered to be the threshold for an intellectual disability. Lee was, however, deemed fit to stand trial despite his low IQ.

Lee was convicted on October 14, 2004, for the rape and murder of LSU graduate student Charlotte Murray Pace. He was sentenced to death via lethal injection. On January 16, 2008, the state Supreme Court upheld the murder conviction and death sentence. Lee was placed on death row at the Louisiana State Penitentiary. On January 21, 2016, Lee died from complications with heart disease, after being transferred to Lane Memorial Hospital in Zachary a few days earlier.

== Alexander v. Lafayette Crime Stoppers Inc. ==
Dianne Alexander's survival and description of Lee assisted investigators in his arrest. Alexander felt she deserved the Lafayette Crime Stoppers Inc. public reward offering of $100,000 for information leading to the arrest of Lee. On or about August 14, 2003, Alexander contacted Lafayette Crime Stoppers Inc. and inquired about the offer. It was then that Lafayette Crime Stoppers Inc. informed Alexander that she was not eligible to receive the reward.

On February 22, 2006, Alexander hired Attorney L. Clayton Burgess to pursue the case. Lafayette Crime Stoppers Inc. claimed that the reward offer expired on August 1, 2003, and that, although Alexander had gone to the police, she did not contact Lafayette Crime Stoppers Inc. before August 1, 2003. Furthermore, Lafayette Crime Stoppers Inc. claimed that she [Alexander] did not use the tipster hotline and thereby did not comply with the "form, terms, or conditions" required by Lafayette Crime Stoppers Inc. The case was decided in Lafayette Crime Stoppers Inc.'s favor.

== In popular culture ==
Lee was portrayed in an episode of the docudrama series Obsession: Dark Desires, which aired in March 2014 and centered on his stalking of surviving victim Collette Dwyer whose tips to police about Lee were not fully followed up. In 2022, he was featured in a four part A&E series called "Butchers of the Bayou" along with fellow serial killer Sean Vincent Gillis, who worked the same area as Lee.

=== "Crying baby" rumor ===
In early 2003, an urban legend began to circulate that Lee was using the taped sounds of a crying baby to lure victims to the door. The Baton Rouge Police were quick to deny that the information was coming from their office. Fueling the rumor were season 3 episodes of the television series Criminal Minds titled "Children of the Dark" and "Tabula Rasa". Lee and the "crying baby" rumor were mentioned in both episodes.

Snopes reported on this urban legend.

== Son's arrest ==
On November 21, 2018, Lee's son Dedrick, then 19, was arrested for negligent homicide for accidentally shooting 16-year-old Valentae Brooks in Jackson, Louisiana. The shooting had occurred eight days earlier at Lee's house. In June 2019, Lee was convicted of negligent homicide, principal to attempted robbery and obstruction of justice. He was released from jail two months later in August as most of his original sentence was deferred.

== See also ==
- List of serial killers in the United States
- List of serial killers by number of victims
