= DNAPrint Genomics =

Defunct American pharmaceutical company

- Type: Public
- Traded as: Expert Market: DNAG
- Industry: Genomics, Forensic Science
- Headquarters: Sarasota, Florida
- Key people: Richard Gabriel (CEO); Hector J. Gomez, Chief Medical Officer; Tony Frudakis, Co-Founder & Chief Scientific Officer
- Products: Pharmacogenomics, Genomic profiling, Genotyping
- Website: www.dnaprint.com

DNAPrint Genomics was a genetics company with a wide range of products related to genetic profiling. They were the first company to introduce forensic and consumer genomics products, which were developed immediately upon the publication of the first complete draft of the human genome in the early 2000s. They researched, developed, and marketed the first ever consumer genomics product, based on "Ancestry Informative Markers" which they used to correctly identify the BioGeographical Ancestry (BGA) of a human based on a sample of their DNA. They also researched, developed and marketed the first ever forensic genomics product - DNAWITNESS - which was used to create a physical profile of donors of crime scene DNA. The company reached a peak of roughly $3M/year in revenues but ceased operations in February 2009.

== Consumer applications ==
DNAPrint Genomics' flagship product was "AncestryByDNA", a DNA test for its consumers that breaks down the percentage ancestry of a client, based on Ancestry Informative Markers (SNP polymorphisms) their DNA. AncestryByDNA was a historical product, representing the first consumer genomics product ever developed and marketed in the US and probably world-wide. It was marketed as a tool for personal genealogical research, and for adoptees looking to learn more about their genealogy.

== Forensic applications ==
DNAPrint's most controversial offering was "DNAWitness", a product that uses the same Ancestry Informative Markers for a forensic purpose, as well as polymorphisms in the human OCA2 gene and others to make inferences about iris (eye), hair, and skin color. DNAPrint was the first to research and publish the linkages between OCA2 polymorphisms and human eye color and by integrating these with the same ancestry informative markers used with its consumer BGA tests for analysis with DNA evidence from crime scenes, DNAPrint Genomics was able to help narrow down suspects based on the construction of an "in-silco constructed, database driven" physical trait or phenotype profile.

In 2006, Scotland Yard and London's Metropolitan Police announced that they would be investigating the use of DNAWitness to narrow suspects in the search for a long-standing effort to capture a serial rapist known as the Minstead Rapist.

DNAWitness was used in 2007 to help narrow down suspects in the investigation into the 2002 murder of Pam Kinamore. Though the police dragnet was initially looking for white suspects based on an early eyewitness, DNAPrint Genomics was later contracted to test the DNA sample, and concluded that the suspect was of "substantial African ancestry". Investigators redirected their investigation to focus on individuals fitting this description and shortly thereafter identified Derrick Todd Lee, who was subsequently convicted of the crime as well as a series of other similar murders in the Baton Rouge, Louisiana, area. This application of forensic phenotyping, where physical characteristics were inferred from crime scene DNA and used to redirect, and help solve a crime, was covered by The New York Times, Wired magazine, Popular Science, U.S. News & World Report, the Sarasota Herald Tribune, the ABC and CBS Evening News programs, Australian and German news programs and in a Forensic Files episode entitled "Tight Fitting Genes" as a historical first.

Since the Lee case, the product has been used in dozens of other serial homicide cases with successful results.

== AncestrybyDNA ==
AncestrybyDNA was invented by Dr. Tony Frudakis in 2002 through DNAPrint Genomics. AncestrybyDNA is an online DNA testing service for the average person—it determines the biogeographical ancestry of an individual through autosomal DNA testing. DNA testing is a process that uses DNA information to determine someone's ancestry accurately up to about 10 generations. After that point, the amount of shared DNA is so little that it is considerably more difficult to identify. Autosomal DNA testing is a specific type of genetic testing that is done by looking at a subset of DNA regions in the autosomal chromosomes (the non-sex chromosomes) that make up the vast majority of the genome. Most autosomal DNA tests examine about a million genetic markers in order to gather information about the DNA donor's ancestry and relatedness. Genetic markers are genes or DNA sequences whose location on the chromosome is known. Genetic markers and genes that are close to each other on a chromosome tend to be inherited together; therefore, genetic markers can help identify a nearby gene. Genetic markers in humans include single polymorphism nucleotides (SNPs), restriction fragment length polymorphisms (RFLPs), variable number of tandem repeats (VNTRs), microsatellites, and copy number variants (CNVs). Because of their known locations, markers can be used to identify individuals or species, as well as determine relatedness between and among species. Typically, these markers are considered "observable variations" due to the fact that the variations can be located on the DNA.

Autosomal DNA tests like AncestrybyDNA are used to identify people with whom the DNA donor shares ancestors. The process involves identifying large, shared chunks of DNA between individuals. These "shared chunks'' are indicators of some kind of relatively-recent shared inheritance. It is rare that a DNA chunk is conserved in two individuals from a common ancestor who lived more than ten generations (around 300 years) in the past. Beyond ten generations, the fraction of ancestors who contributed directly to the DNA being tested is incredibly small due to genetic crossing-over events and the inherent randomness in the process of transferring DNA from parent to offspring. While shared DNA chunks are strong indicators of relatedness, determining the exact age of the DNA donor's ancestors beyond four generations is difficult. Additionally, there is no definitive way to determine the exact relationship between the DNA donor and the perceived ancestor. While DNA genetic testing is often a good approximation of relatedness to older ancestors, it is hardly definitive.

Both AncestrybyDNA and DNAPrint Genomics are elements of a larger conversation about the genetic basis of race. In particular, the delivery of the information to the average consumer in the form of percentages of racial background has proved to be somewhat misleading. Several companies offer similar genetic testing services as AncestrybyDNA, such as CRI Genetics, AncestryDNA (not to be confused with AncestrybyDNA), and 23andMe. Each of these companies returns varying genetic results in the form of percentages. This occurs for a few reasons. Firstly, each company uses different genetic databases for genetic comparison. Secondly, the DNA samples used in the databases are categorized in different ways. Finally, each company uses unique algorithms to make the time estimates and the approximate amount of relatedness of the DNA donor to their ancestors. Quantifying the racial compositions of a DNA donor's DNA suggests that distinct divisions exist between human populations. Simply put, patterns of relatedness are flexible estimates. To assume that people are easily categorizable is inaccurate.

Aside from the percentage problem, genetic testing processes such as AncestrybyDNA—especially in the context of uncovering a racial background—are connected to the perpetuation of the myth of race. As stated by the National Human Genome Research Institute,

"Race is a fluid concept used to group people according to various factors including, ancestral background and social identity. Race is also used to group people that share a set of visible characteristics, such as skin color and facial features. Though these visible traits are influenced by genes, the vast majority of genetic variation exists within racial groups and not between them. Race is an ideology and for this reason, many scientists believe that race should be more accurately described as a social construct and not a biological one." All in all, race has proven over and over to be a social construct rather than a biological fact.

== Historical relevance ==
In the early 2000s, under the leadership of founder and then CEO Tony N. Frudakis, Ph.D., DNAPrint forged a nascent consumer genetics/genomics and forensic phenotyping marketplace. In the mid to late 2000s many journalists and academics harshly criticized DNAPrint's application of genomics research for consumer and forensic purposes but by the early 2000-teens, the forensic science applications of BioGeographical Ancestry (BGA) admixture analysis for the inference of BGA and certain anthropometric phenotypes such as skin shade, eye/hair color, had become well established and by 2019 the market for these types of products had grown to over $500M/year in size. As of 2019, various capillary electrophoresis (e.g. Applied Biosystems) and next generation sequencing platform and consumable manufacturers have introduced human identity products combining classical (CODIS eligible) STR profiling marker sets with unique SNP based AIMS for the inference of BGA and phenotype (e.g. ForenSeq, from Illumina's Verogen). Various private and public laboratories had also emerged to provide forensic phenotyping services (e.g. Parabon Nanolabs).

In the mid-2000s, Frudakis wrote the seminal textbook introducing the forensic and consumer market application of genome-derived marker panels.

In the mid-to late 2000s, before it had fully developed these new markets, the hedge fund supporting DNAPrint liquidated the company and sold its intellectual property and know-how to DNA Diagnostics Company (DDC). Just prior to the company's liquidation, other companies launched similar products in the consumer genomic genealogy market (e.g. 23andMe and Ancestry.com). By 2018, these companies had extended the science significantly, building even larger genomic databases and enabling finer level and even entirely new inferences. For example, in forensics, over 70 serial homicide cases (including the Golden State Killer) having been solved through genetic genealogy hits enabled by the types of consumer genomics databases DNAPrint was the first to introduce. In these cases, potential relatives of individuals that donated DNA to crime scenes are identified. With consumer genealogy, family members can now be identified and reconnected through database matching, and customers can now pinpoint even intracontinental and regional family origins using the types of consumer genomics databases DNAPrint was the first to introduce.
