= Niwot, Colorado =

Census-designated place in Boulder County, Colorado, United States

- Census-designated place
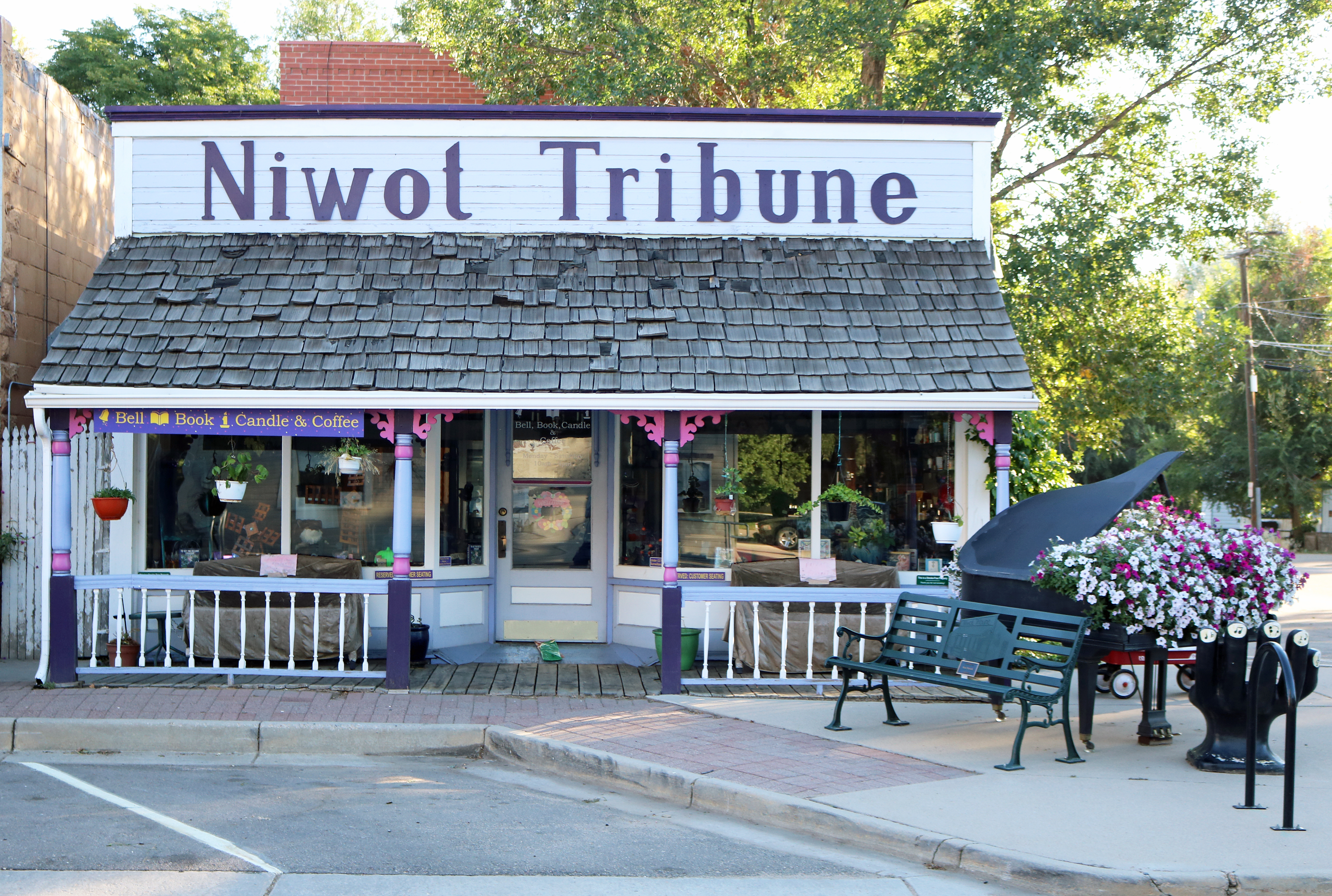
- The old Niwot Tribune office on 2nd Avenue

- Location of the Niwot CDP in Boulder County, Colorado
- Coordinates: 40°05′53″N 105°09′19″W
- Country: United States
- State: Colorado
- County: Boulder County
- Named for: Chief Niwot

Government
  - Type: unincorporated town

Area
  - Total: 4.005 sq mi (10.374 km^{2})
  - Land: 3.996 sq mi (10.350 km^{2})
  - Water: 0.0093 sq mi (0.024 km^{2})
- Elevation: 5,168 ft (1,575 m)

Population (2020)
  - Total: 4,306
  - Density: 1,000/sq mi (387/km^{2})
- Time zone: UTC-7 (MST)
  - Summer (DST): UTC-6 (MDT)
- ZIP Code: 80503, 80544
- Area codes: 303 & 720
- GNIS feature ID: 2408929

Niwot is an unincorporated town, a post office, and a census-designated place (CDP) located in and governed by Boulder County, Colorado, United States. The CDP is a part of the Boulder, CO Metropolitan Statistical Area and the Front Range Urban Corridor. The Niwot post office has the ZIP Codes 80503 and 80544 (for post office boxes). At the United States Census 2020, the population of the Niwot CDP was 4,306.

== History ==
Niwot is named for Arapaho Chief Niwot, a tribal leader in the Boulder area during the nineteenth century. The name means "left-handed".

The town of Niwot was first platted in 1875 along either side of the Colorado Central Railroad. Initially, the town's commercial district was to the west of the railroad, while the residential was to the east. By the early 1900s, the bulk of the town shifted to the east side of the track, while the buildings to the west were either relocated or burned down.

In November 2026, Niwot voted on whether to become an incorporated town. Residents in the proposed town boundary voted against incorporation, with roughly 73% voting against and 27% voting for the incorporation ballot question. Residents also voted against two additional governance questions and five tax measures that would have funded the new town government.

Niwot is recognized for being the former headquarters of footwear company Crocs, Inc. for more than a decade prior to June 2020.

== Geography ==
Niwot is located along State Highway 119, halfway between Boulder and Longmont.

The Niwot CDP has an area of 2,563 acres (10.374 km^{2}), including 5.9 acres (0.024 km^{2}) of water.

=== Climate ===
Climate data for Niwot, Colorado
Month	Jan	Feb	Mar	Apr	May	Jun	Jul	Aug	Sep	Oct	Nov	Dec	Year
Mean daily maximum °F (°C)	47 (8)	48 (9)	56 (13)	63 (17)	72 (22)	82 (28)	88 (31)	85 (29)	78 (26)	66 (19)	54 (12)	45 (7)	65.3 (18.5)
Mean daily minimum °F (°C)	22 (−6)	23 (−5)	29 (−2)	36 (2)	44 (7)	51 (11)	57 (14)	56 (13)	48 (9)	38 (3)	28 (−2)	21 (−6)	37.75 (3.19)
Average precipitation inches (mm)	0.76 (19)	0.82 (21)	2.19 (56)	2.87 (73)	2.8 (71)	2.2 (56)	1.79 (45)	1.84 (47)	1.68 (43)	1.55 (39)	1.24 (31)	0.94 (24)	20.68 (525)
Source: Accuweather.com

== Demographics ==
=== 2020 census ===
As of the 2020 census, Niwot had a population of 4,306. The median age was 49.0 years. 17.0% of residents were under the age of 18 and 19.8% of residents were 65 years of age or older. For every 100 females there were 96.2 males, and for every 100 females age 18 and over there were 95.3 males age 18 and over.

The population density was 1,076.5 people per square mile. 0.0% of residents lived in urban areas, while 100.0% lived in rural areas.

There were 1,665 households in Niwot, of which 24.9% had children under the age of 18 living in them. Of all households, 61.4% were married-couple households, 14.6% were households with a male householder and no spouse or partner present, and 19.6% were households with a female householder and no spouse or partner present. About 24.0% of all households were made up of individuals and 10.7% had someone living alone who was 65 years of age or older.

There were 1,725 housing units, of which 3.5% were vacant. The homeowner vacancy rate was 1.5% and the rental vacancy rate was 5.1%.

Racial composition as of the 2020 census
Race	Number	Percent
White	3,701	85.9%
Black or African American	34	0.8%
American Indian and Alaska Native	18	0.4%
Asian	180	4.2%
Native Hawaiian and Other Pacific Islander	5	0.1%
Some other race	124	2.9%
Two or more races	244	5.7%
Hispanic or Latino (of any race)	219	5.1%

=== Demographic estimates ===
According to the U.S. Census Bureau's American Community Survey data estimates for 2019, the average household size was 2.51 and the average family size was 3.00.

=== Income and poverty ===
The median income for a household in the CDP was $118,914, and the median income for a family was $179,038. Males had a median income of $81,813 versus $39,279 for females. The per capita income for the CDP was $74,961. About 2.9% of families and 6.0% of the population were below the poverty line, including 3.8% of those under age 18 and 3.8% of those age 65 or over.

The United States Census Bureau initially defined the Niwot CDP for the 1990 United States census.

Niwot CDP, Colorado
Year	Pop.	±%
1990	2,666	—
2000	4,160	+56.0%
2010	4,006	−3.7%
2020	4,306	+7.5%
Source: United States Census Bureau

== Education ==
Niwot is served by the St. Vrain Valley School District. The two schools within the town are Niwot Elementary School and Niwot High School. Niwot High School serves students from Niwot, in addition to those from southern Longmont and Gunbarrel, while Niwot Elementary school mainly serves students from the immediate community.

== Notable people ==
- Elise Cranny, distance runner and American indoor record holder in the 5000 m.
- Brian Dietzen, American actor, attended Niwot High School
- Neil Gorsuch, U.S. Supreme Court Justice.
- Alan Stern, planetary scientist
- Pete Wernick, five-string bluegrass banjo player

== Popular culture ==
- In 2013, downtown Niwot was used as the set for the Leonardo DiCaprio-produced film Dear Eleanor, which featured actors such as Jessica Alba and Luke Wilson.

== See also ==
- Front Range Urban Corridor
