= Silver Creek High School (Colorado) =

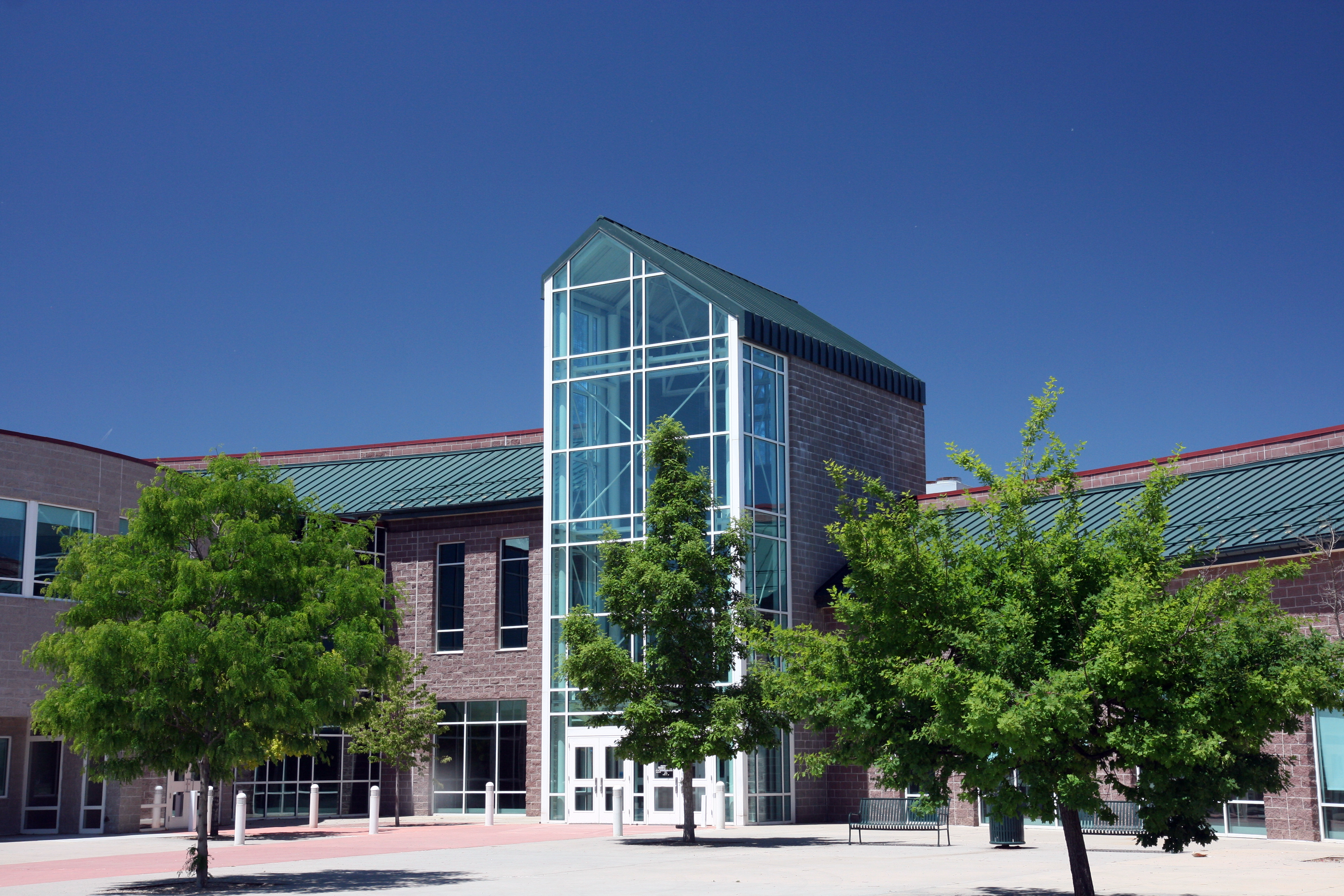
- Main entrance in 2016

Location
- 4901 Nelson Road; Longmont, Colorado 80503; United States
- 40°9′4″N 105°10′3″W

Information
- School type: Public high school
- School district: St. Vrain Valley RE-1J
- CEEB code: 060953
- NCES School ID: 080537001814
- Principal: Erick Finnestead
- Teaching staff: 53.59 (FTE)
- Grades: 9–12
- Enrollment: 1,215 (2023–2024)
- Student to teacher ratio: 22.67
- Colors: Maroon, silver, black
- Athletics conference: CHSAA
- Mascot: Raptor
- Website: schs.svvsd.org

Silver Creek High School is a public high school located in Longmont, Colorado, United States. It is part of the St. Vrain Valley School District. Silver Creek hosts Universal High School, an independent learning program, and the Silver Creek Leadership Academy.

== School colors and mascot ==
Silver Creek's colors are maroon and silver. Its mascot, a raptor, is often depicted as the tiger owl.

== Universal High School ==
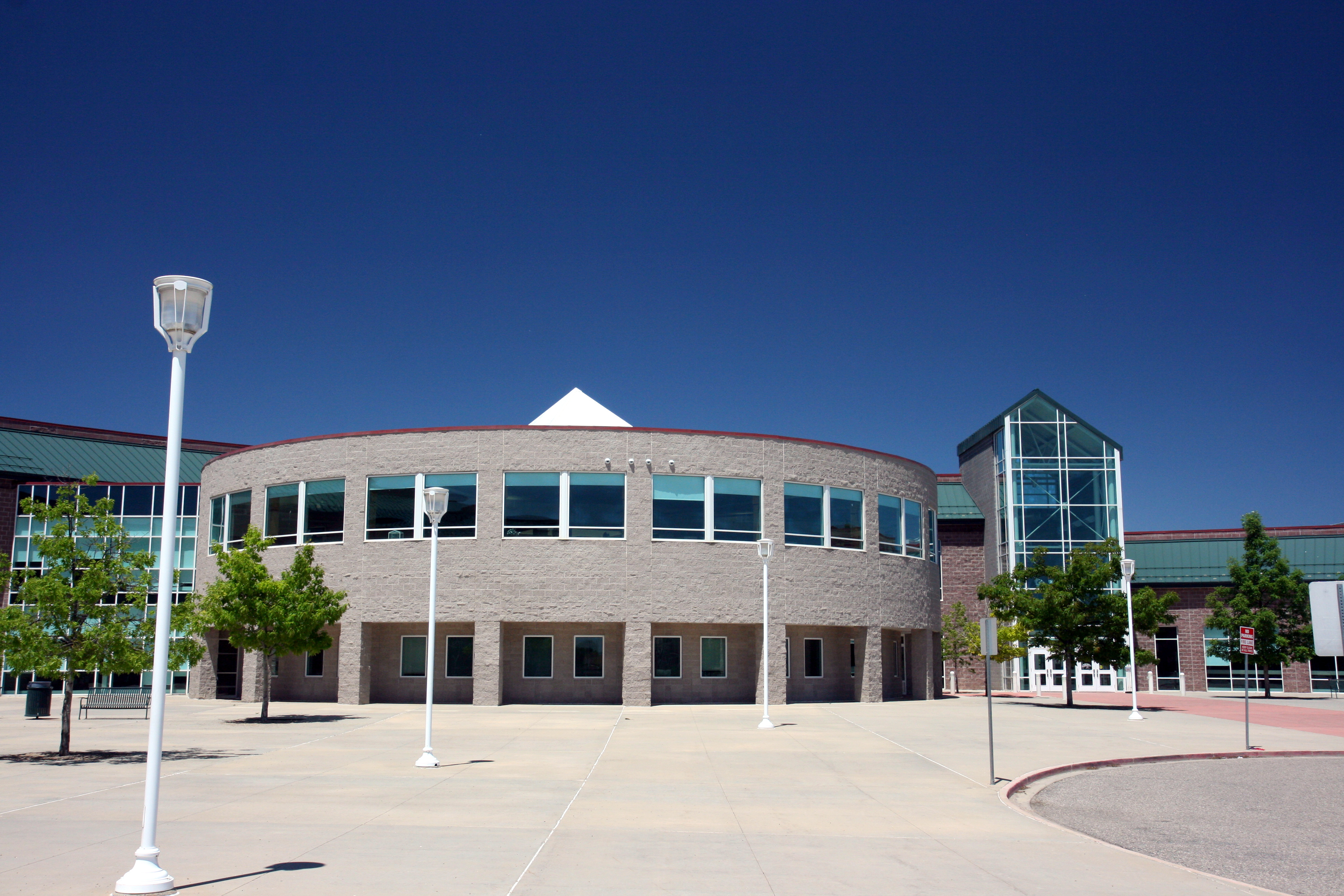
Main view of Silver Creek High School

Universal High School (UHS) at Silver Creek is an alternative education system for students for whom independent learning is more effective. The program is standards-based, and students are able to complete courses in a timeframe that suits their needs, anywhere from a week to a year. Students enrolled in UHS have the option of taking regular classes at Silver Creek High School or at their original high school, independent studies, and online courses. Students are required to take at least four regular courses in order to be considered full-time, or two in order to be part-time.

== Demographics ==
The demographic breakdown of the 1,208 students enrolled in 2024–2025 was:

- American Indian/Alaskan Native: 0.17%
- Asian: 4.64%
- Black: 1.41%
- Hispanic: 21.85%
- Native Hawaiian/Pacific Islander: 0.08%
- White: 68.38%
- Two or more races: 3.48%

(Percentages may not add up to 100% due to rounding)

Students eligible for free or reduced lunch: 26.99%

== Athletic accomplishments ==
State championships
Sport	No. of championships	Year
Football	1	2012
Golf	1	2011
Soccer, girls'	1	2008
Swimming, boys'	1	2008
Track & field, boys'	1	2018
Swimming, boys'	1	2021
Total	6	

== Notable alumni ==
- Valarie Allman (2013), track & field athlete, two-time Olympic gold medalist
- Cole Winn (2018), pitcher for the Texas Rangers

== See also ==
- St. Vrain Valley School District
- Longmont, Colorado
- Index of Colorado-related articles
