= Scioto Grove Metro Park =

Park and nature preserve in Grove City, Ohio, U.S.

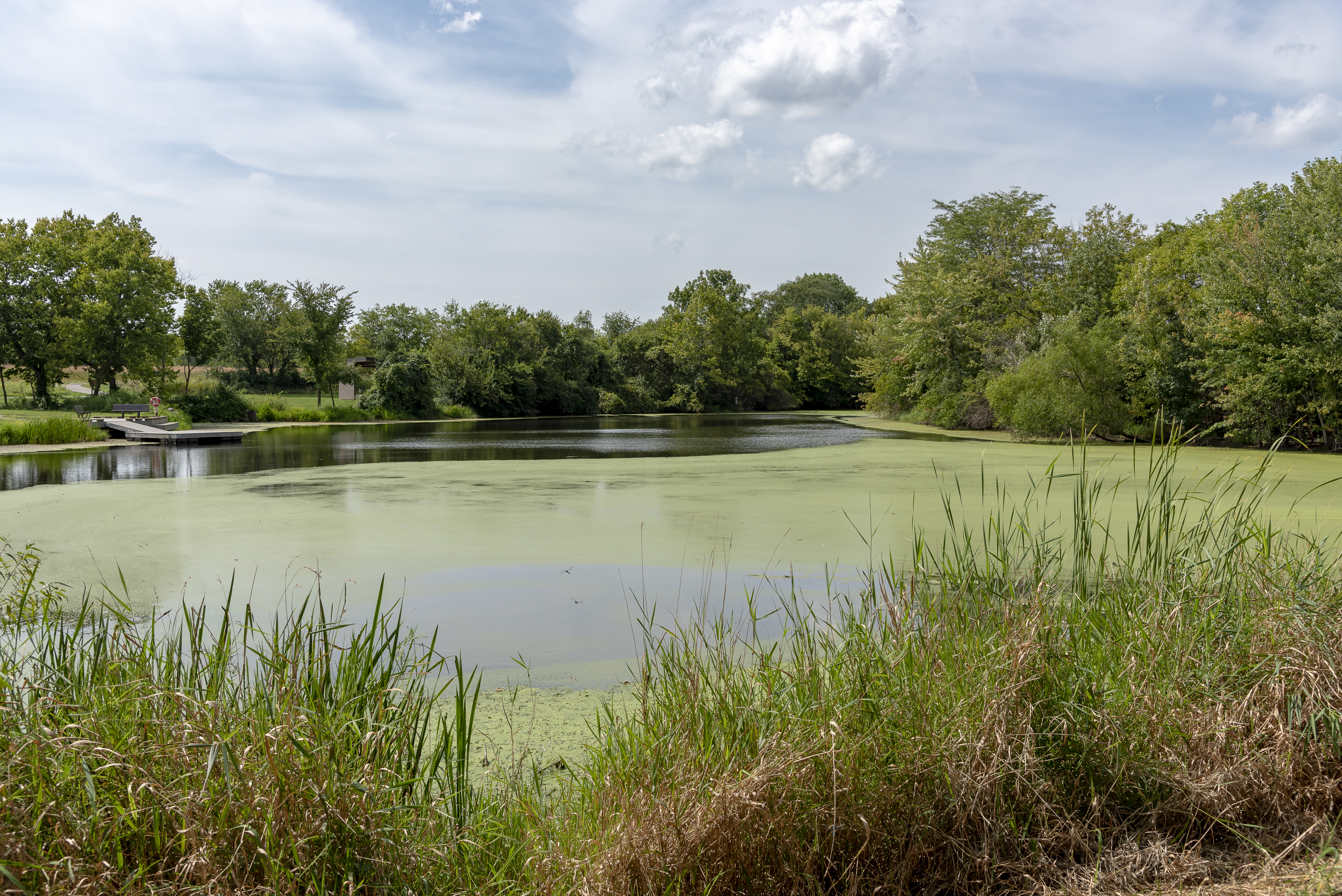
- Pond at Scioto Grove
- Interactive map of Scioto Grove Metro Park
- Type: Metro park
- Location: Ohio
- Coordinates: 39.852117°N 83.024302°W
- Area: 620 acres (250 ha)
- Opened: 2016
- Administrator: Columbus and Franklin County Metro Parks
- Open: Year-round
- Paths: 8
- Habitats: Forest, fields, meadows
- Parking: Multiple lots
- Website: Official website

Scioto Grove Metro Park is a metropolitan park in Grove City, Ohio, owned and operated by Columbus and Franklin County Metro Parks. Scioto Grove features eight trails and five backpacking campsites. It has picnic shelters, an event space, traditional and 3-D archery ranges, and a disc golf course.

The park opened to the public on May 6, 2016.

In 2022, Metro Parks began the process of relocating the 90- to 100-foot Keystone Fire Lookout Tower in Jackson County, Ohio to Scioto Grove.
