= Longmont High School =

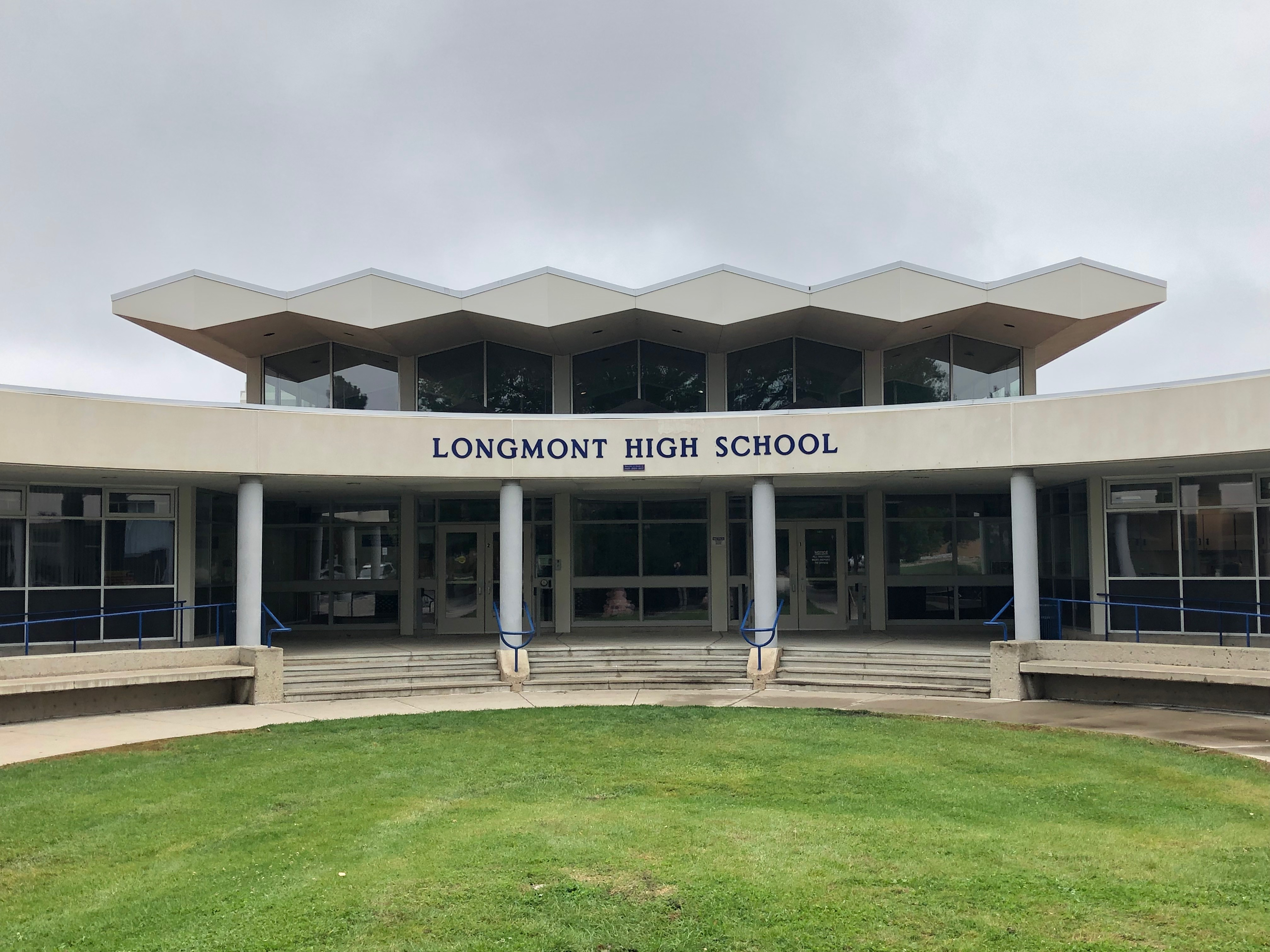

Location
- 1040 Sunset Street; Longmont, Colorado 80501; United States; 40°10′35″N 105°7′12″W

Information
- School type: Public high school
- Motto: Tradition, Pride, and Excellence
- School district: St. Vrain Valley RE-1J
- CEEB code: 060395
- NCES School ID: 080537000909
- Principal: Jeff McMurry
- Teaching staff: 63.76 (on an FTE basis)
- Grades: 9–12
- Enrollment: 1,254 (2023–2024)
- Student to teacher ratio: 19.67
- Colors: Royal blue and white
- Athletics conference: CHSAA
- Mascot: Trojan
- Website: lhs.svvsd.org

Longmont High School is the original high school of the city of Longmont, Colorado, United States, and opened its doors to students in 1901. The school is located in central Longmont and serves as a high school for the St. Vrain Valley School District.

== Athletics ==
The Longmont High School football team won the national championship in 1908. It went on to win its next Colorado state football championship in 1940, followed by back-to-back state titles in 1954 and 1955. The school is perhaps best known, however, for its record streak, starting in 1988 and ending in 1992, in which the Trojans went 45–0, winning three consecutive championship crowns. This remains the longest winning streak in large-school Colorado football history. In 2018, the Girls swim team won the 3A championship.

== Robotics ==
The VEX Robotics team "Pronounce This" (2654P) won its first state championship in the 2021–2022 season and went on to win back-to-back state championships in 2023 and 2024. Team 2654P earned the Excellence Award at the 2024 VEX World Championship. The team was dissolved in 2025.

Year	Team	Achievement
2021-2022 - Tipping Point	2654P	State Champions
2022-2023 - Spin Up	2654P	State Champions
2023-2024 - Over Under	2654P	State Champions, World Champions

== Music ==
The Longmont Combined Schools Drumline has competed in Percussion Scholastic World (PSW) in 2001; Percussion Scholastic Open (PSO), winning two state championships from 2002 to 2006; Percussion Scholastic National A PSNA (in RMPA competition 2009), from 2007 to 2009, winning state in 2009; and in Percussion Scholastic A (PSA) from 2010 to present. They compete almost every year in the WGI competitions. They no longer compete as a scholastic group for WGI. They are an eight-time WGI World Championship finalist, placing as follows:

Year	Program title	Score	Competitive result
2001	The Toys	84.20	11th Percussion Scholastic World (PSW)
2002	West Side Story	84.30	9th Percussion Scholastic Open (PSO)
2003	Superstitions	87.35	7th PSO
2005	The Iron Road	91.90	4th PSO
2006	The Four Corners	84.05	12th PSO
2008	Dinner at Pertrucci's	86.05	9th Percussion Scholastic A (PSA)
2023	Hide and Speak	92.863	6th PSA
2024	Playing with Colors	83.375	15th PSA

== Demographics ==
The demographic breakdown of the 1,268 students enrolled in 2024-2025 was:

- American Indian/Alaska Native: 0.32%
- Asian: 1.5%
- Native Hawaiian/Pacific Islander: 0.16%
- Hispanic: 41.25%
- Black: 0.63%
- White: 52.6%
- Two or more races: 3.55%

(Percentages may not add to 100% due to rounding)

== Notable alumni ==
- Greg Biekert – former linebacker for the Oakland Raiders and Minnesota Vikings
- Vance D. Brand – former NASA astronaut, test pilot, mission commander and engineer
- Walt Clay – former halfback and fullback for the Chicago Rockets and Los Angeles Dons
- Eric Coyle – former center for the Washington Redskins
- Eddie Eagan - former U.S. Olympian (gold medalist in boxing and bobsledding) and chairman of the New York State Athletic Commission
- David Pauley – former Major League pitcher
- Vince Rafferty – former center and guard for the Green Bay Packers
- Ed Werder – ESPN NFL analyst
