= Frederick High School (Colorado) =

Location
- 5690 Tipple Parkway; Frederick, Colorado 80504; United States; 40°05′52″N 104°55′58″W

Information
- Type: Public
- Motto: The sky belongs to eagles, even during storms.
- Established: 2012; 14 years ago
- School district: St. Vrain Valley School District
- CEEB code: 060625
- Principal: Ashlie Swanson
- Staff: 62.58 (FTE)
- Grades: 9 to 12
- Enrollment: 1,460 (2023-2024)
- Student to teacher ratio: 23.33
- Colors: Navy Blue and gold
- Athletics conference: 4A CHSAA Conference
- Mascot: Golden Eagles
- Rival: Mead High School and Erie High School
- Website: fhs.svvsd.org

Frederick High School is a public high school in Frederick, Colorado, United States, about 40 miles north of Denver. It is a four-year public school serving grades 9 through 12. It is one of the largest schools in the St. Vrain Valley School District, with an enrollment of around 1,300 in 2022.

The school is part of the St. Vrain Valley School District. In addition to Frederick, the school primarily serves students from the nearby communities of Firestone and Dacono.

The school colors are Navy Blue and Gold and the mascot is the Golden Eagle. The Golden Eagle became the school's mascot after Colorado Senate Bill 21-116 was passed, which levied severe financial penalties for public schools in the state with Native American mascots (the school's mascot was formally the Warrior).

The current building is the third iteration of Frederick High School in Colorado. The original Frederick High School was established in 1907 but closed in 1961 due to school consolidation. The second school, located at 600 Fifth Street, opened in 1979 and was a middle-high school serving grades 6 through 12. The middle and high schools separated in 2012, with Frederick High School moving into its current location at 5690 Tipple Parkway and the former high school becoming Thunder Valley Middle School.

The theater department of the school has gained recognition in Colorado and beyond. The International Thespian Society Troupe 4391, which is a part of the department, has achieved several notable accomplishments, including a student named Thomas Beeker winning a Jimmy Award. The department has also been invited to showcase its productions at various events, such as the Colorado Thespian Conference, where they performed Newsies at the Buell Theater.

The school hosts a biomedical science magnet program as well as a PTECH program, which pairs students with local tech firms and college coursework to earn them an associate's degree at graduation. The school is also known for its sports teams regularly making playoffs.

In the past Frederick's rival has been Erie High School, but presently Frederick's primary rival is Mead High School.

== Demographics ==
The demographic breakdown of the 1,491 students enrolled in 2024–2025 was:

- American Indian/Alaska Native: 0.47%
- Asian: 1.95%
- Native Hawaiian/Pacific Islander: 0.07%
- Hispanic: 38.7%
- Black: 1.14%
- White: 54.2%
- Two or more races: 3.49

(Percentages may not add to 100% due to rounding)

== Notable alumni ==
Thomas Beeker - Broadway and television actor
