= Firestone, Colorado =

Statutory town in Weld County, Colorado, United States

- statutory town
- Town of Firestone
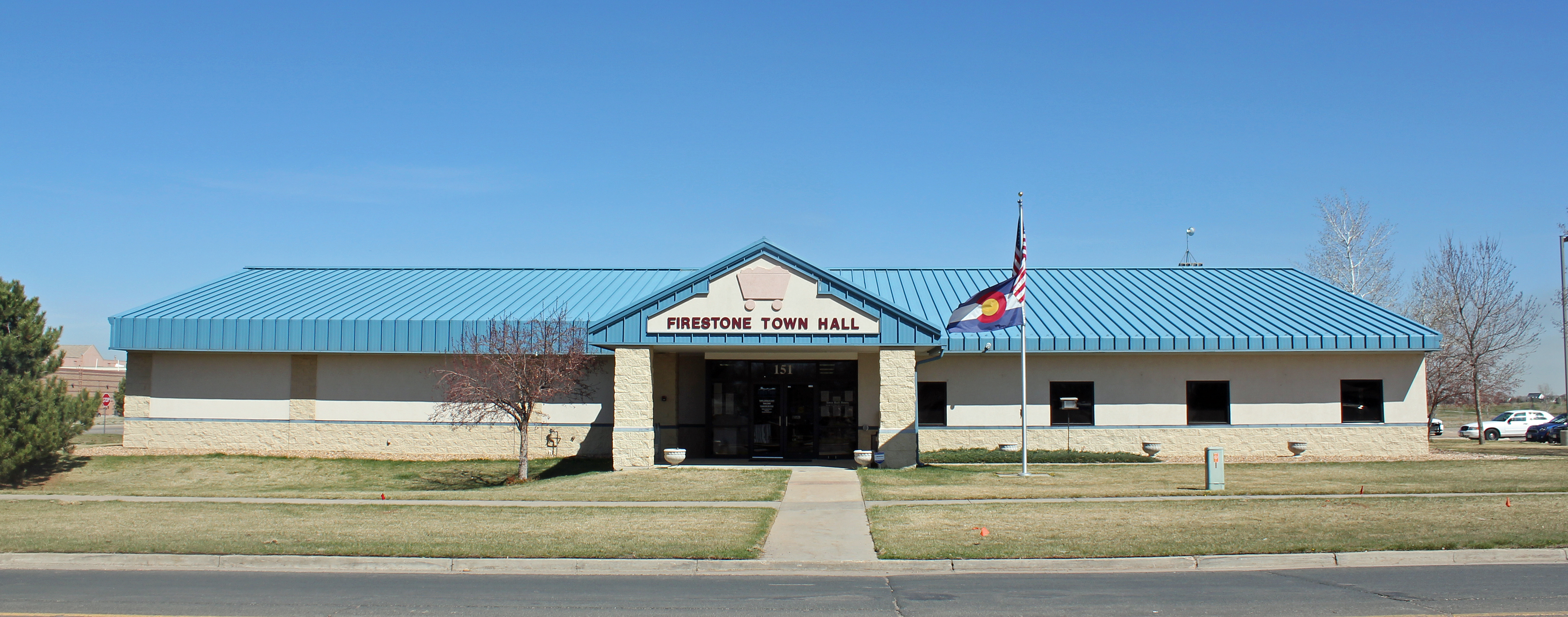
- The former Firestone Town Hall (2015)

- Flag
- Motto: "A Community In Motion"
- Location of the Town of Firestone in Weld County, Colorado
- Coordinates: 40°09′03″N 104°58′12″W
- Country: United States
- State: Colorado
- County: Weld
- Incorporated (town): October 8, 1908

Government
  - Type: statutory town
  - Body: Firestone Board of Trustees

Area
  - Total: 14.227 sq mi (36.849 km^{2})
  - Land: 13.568 sq mi (35.141 km^{2})
  - Water: 0.659 sq mi (1.708 km^{2})
- Elevation: 4,856 ft (1,480 m)

Population (2020)
  - Total: 16,381
  - Density: 1,207/sq mi (466/km^{2})
- Time zone: UTC−07:00 (MST)
  - Summer (DST): UTC−06:00 (MDT)
- ZIP code: 80504, 80520 (PO Box)
- Area codes: 303/720/983
- GNIS place ID: 180841
- GNIS town ID: 2412626
- FIPS code: 08-26600
- Website: www.firestoneco.gov

The Town of Firestone is a statutory town in southwestern Weld County, Colorado, United States. The town population was 16,381 at the 2020 United States census, a 61.44% increase since the 2010 United States census. Firestone is a part of the Greeley, CO Metropolitan Statistical Area and the Front Range Urban Corridor.

== History ==
The Firestone, Colorado, post office opened on August 30, 1907, and the Town of Firestone was incorporated on October 8, 1908. The town was named for Jacob Firestone, a landowner.

In April 2017, an explosion caused by an untapped gas well destroyed a home on Twilight Avenue, killing two people and seriously injuring a third. This incident prompted a state-wide discussion on fracking and drilling throughout the state. On May 24, 2018, the drilling company responsible for the blast, Anadarko Petroleum Corp., announced it had reached a settlement for an undisclosed sum with the family affected by the blast.

On June 7, 2021, an EF-2 tornado started on the farmlands of Firestone. It tracked northeast for about 2 miles before heading north away from the town. Minimal damage to crops was recorded.

== Geography ==
Firestone is located in southwestern Weld County about 30 miles (48 km) north of Denver.

At the 2020 United States census, the town had a total area of 9,106 acres (36.849 km^{2}) including 422 acres (1.708 km^{2}) of water.

== Demographics ==
Historical population
Census	Pop.	Note	%±
1910	110		—
1920	214		94.5%
1930	240		12.1%
1940	262		9.2%
1950	297		13.4%
1960	276		−7.1%
1970	570		106.5%
1980	1,204		111.2%
1990	1,358		12.8%
2000	1,908		40.5%
2010	10,147		431.8%
2020	16,381		61.4%
2023 (est.)	18,589	▲	13.5%
U.S. Decennial Census

=== 2020 census ===
As of the 2020 census, Firestone had a population of 16,381. The median age was 34.3 years. 29.4% of residents were under the age of 18 and 9.4% of residents were 65 years of age or older. For every 100 females there were 100.2 males, and for every 100 females age 18 and over there were 96.0 males age 18 and over.

94.7% of residents lived in urban areas, while 5.3% lived in rural areas.

There were 5,383 households in Firestone, of which 45.0% had children under the age of 18 living in them. Of all households, 63.5% were married-couple households, 12.7% were households with a male householder and no spouse or partner present, and 16.6% were households with a female householder and no spouse or partner present. About 14.2% of all households were made up of individuals and 3.9% had someone living alone who was 65 years of age or older.

There were 5,614 housing units, of which 4.1% were vacant. The homeowner vacancy rate was 1.2% and the rental vacancy rate was 8.5%.

Racial composition as of the 2020 census
Race	Number	Percent
White	12,357	75.4%
Black or African American	129	0.8%
American Indian and Alaska Native	196	1.2%
Asian	405	2.5%
Native Hawaiian and Other Pacific Islander	17	0.1%
Some other race	1,090	6.7%
Two or more races	2,187	13.4%
Hispanic or Latino (of any race)	3,486	21.3%

=== 2010 census ===
As of the census of 2010, there were 10,147 people and 3,134 households in the town. The population density was 978.5 inhabitants per square mile (377.8/km^{2}). There were 3,499 housing units at an average density of 337.4 units per square mile (130.3 units/km^{2}). The racial makeup of the town was 87.8% White, 0.7% African American, 0.8% Native American, 1.4% Asian, <0.1% Pacific Islander, and 3% from two or more races. Hispanic or Latino of any race were 16.2% of the population.

=== 2000 census ===
There were 621 households in 2000 out of which 44.0% had children under the age of 18 living with them, 67.8% were married couples living together, 10.0% had a female householder with no husband present, and 19.0% were non-families. 13.8% of all households were made up of individuals, and 2.6% had someone living alone who was 65 years of age or older. The average household size was 3.07 and the average family size was 3.41.

In the town, the population was spread out, with 31.7% under the age of 18, 7.8% from 18 to 24, 34.6% from 25 to 44, 21.4% from 45 to 64, and 4.6% who were 65 years of age or older. The median age was 32 years. For every 100 females, there were 96.9 males. For every 100 females age 18 and over, there were 100.3 males.

In 2000, the median income for a household in the town was $55,313, and the median income for a family was $59,219. Males had a median income of $37,230 versus $30,147 for females. The per capita income for the town was $20,428. About 4.7% of families and 7.2% of the population were below the poverty line, including 10.9% of those under age 18 and 9.9% of those age 65 or over.

== Points of interest ==
Firestone has more than thirty-five parks and twelve miles of scenic trail. The Firestone/Legacy Trail runs for more than twelve miles, much of that distance along a railroad right-of-way which once serviced the coal industry.

== Public schools ==
Firestone falls within the St. Vrain Valley School District, with three elementary schools (Centennial, Prairie Ridge, and Legacy) and one middle school (Coal Ridge). Students typically attend one of the two high schools that serve the Firestone locale: Mead High School or Frederick High School.

== Notable people ==
- Eric Uptagrafft (born 1966), sport shooter

== See also ==
- Greeley, CO Metropolitan Statistical Area
- Denver-Aurora-Greeley, CO Combined Statistical Area
- Front Range Urban Corridor
