= St. Vrain Valley Schools =

School district in Colorado, United States

Address
- 395 South Pratt Parkway Longmont, Colorado, 80501; United States
- Coordinates: 40°9′19″N 105°6′26″W

District information
- Type: Unified school district
- Motto: Academic excellence by design
- Grades: P–12
- Established: 1961; 65 years ago
- Superintendent: Jackie Kapushion
- School board: 7 members
- Chair of the board: Jocelyn Gilligan
- Schools: 54
- Budget: $526,776,000
- NCES District ID: 0805370

Students and staff
- Students: 31,757
- Teachers: 1,954.40 (on an FTE basis)
- Staff: 4,060.49 (on an FTE basis)
- Student–teacher ratio: 16.25

Other information
- Website: svvsd.org

St. Vrain Valley Schools is a unified school district based in Longmont, Colorado. It serves the northern parts of Boulder County and parts of adjacent Larimer and Weld counties. In the 2023–24 academic year, the district served 31,757 students at 54 schools.

== Schools ==
=== Stand-alone preschools ===
- Spark! Discovery Preschool

=== Elementary schools ===
Ref:

- Alpine Elementary School
- Black Rock Elementary School
- Blue Mountain Elementary School
- Burlington Elementary School
- Centennial Elementary School
- Central Elementary School
- Columbine Elementary School
- Eagle Crest Elementary School
- Erie Elementary School
- Fall River Elementary School
- Grandview Elementary School
- Highlands Elementary School
- Hygiene Elementary School
- Indian Peaks Elementary School
- Legacy Elementary School
- Longmont Estates Elementary School
- Lyons Elementary School
- Mead Elementary School
- Mountain View Elementary School
- Niwot Elementary School
- Northridge Elementary School
- Prairie Ridge Elementary School
- Red Hawk Elementary School
- Rocky Mountain Elementary School
- Sanborn Elementary School

=== Middle schools ===
- Altona Middle School
- Coal Ridge Middle School
- Erie Middle School
- Longs Peak Middle School
- Lyons Middle/Senior High School
- Mead Middle School
- Sunset Middle School
- Trail Ridge Middle School
- Westview Middle School

=== K-8 schools ===
- Big Sky K-8
- Thunder Valley K-8
- Timberline PK-8
- Soaring Heights PK-8

=== High schools ===
- Erie High School
- Frederick High School
- Longmont High School
- Lyons Middle/Senior High School
- Mead High School
- Niwot High School
- Silver Creek High School
- Skyline High School

=== Alternative Education ===
- New Meridian High School

=== Charter schools ===
- Aspen Ridge Preparatory School (K–8)
- Carbon Valley Academy (K–8, expanding to K–12)
- Flagstaff Academy (K–8)
- Imagine Charter School at Firestone (K–8)
- St Vrain Community Montessori School (pre K–8)
- Twin Peaks Charter Academy (K–12)

== Funding ==
In the 2020-2021 school year, the St. Vrain Valley School District had a total budget of $475,842,000, coming out to $15,197 per student. 53% of its funding was local, 33% was state, and 11% was federal.
