= List of charter schools in Colorado =

List of charter schools in U.S. State of Colorado

The location of the State of Colorado in the United States of America.

Following is a sortable table of public charter schools in the U.S. State of Colorado:

== Table ==
Colorado Charter Schools
Charter School	Grades	Year	School District	Location	County
French American School of Denver	K–3	2021	Denver Public Schools	Denver	Denver
The Academy (Westminster, Colorado)	K–12	1994	Adams 12 Five Star Schools	Westminster	Adams
Academy Charter School (Castle Rock, Colorado)	K–8	1993	Douglas County School District RE-1	Castle Rock	Douglas
Academy for Advanced and Creative Learning	K–8	2010	Colorado Springs School District 11	Colorado Springs	El Paso
Academy of Urban Learning	9–12	2005	Denver Public Schools	Denver	Denver
ACE Community Challenge School	7–10	2000	Denver Public Schools	Denver	Denver
Addenbrooke Classical Academy	K–12	2013	Jefferson County School District	Lakewood	Jefferson
Alta Vista Charter School	K–6	1998	Lamar School District RE-2	Lamar	Prowers
American Academy (Castle Pines North, Colorado)	K–8	2005	Douglas County School District RE-1	Castle Pines North	Douglas
Animas High School	9–10	2009	Charter School Institute	Durango	La Plata
Ascent Classical Academy of Douglas County	K–12	2018	Charter School Institute	Lone Tree	Douglas
Ascent Classical Academy of Northern Colorado	K–12	2020	Charter School Institute	Windsor	Larimer
Aspen Community School	P–8	1995	Aspen School District 1	Woody Creek	Pitkin
Aspen Ridge Preparatory School	PK–8	2011	St. Vrain Valley School District RE-1J	Erie	Weld
Atlas Preparatory School	5–12	2009	Harrison School District 2	Colorado Springs	El Paso
Aurora Academy (Aurora, Colorado)	K–8	2000	Aurora Public Schools	Aurora	Arapahoe
AXL Academy	P–8	2007	Aurora Public Schools	Aurora	Arapahoe
Banning Lewis Ranch Academy at Northtree	K–8	2006	Falcon School District 49	Colorado Springs	El Paso
Battle Rock Charter School	K–6	1994	Montezuma-Cortez School District RE-1	Cortez	Montezuma
Belle Creek Charter School	K–8	2003	Brighton School District 27J	Henderson	Adams
Ben Franklin Academy (Highlands Ranch, Colorado)	K–8	2011	Douglas County School District RE-1	Highlands Ranch	Douglas
Boulder Preparatory High School	9–12	1998	Boulder Valley School District RE-2	Boulder	Boulder
Bromley East Charter School	P–8	2001	Brighton School District 27J	Brighton	Adams
Caprock Academy	K–12	2007	Charter School Institute	Grand Junction	Mesa
Carbon Valley Academy	K–8	2005	St. Vrain Valley School District RE-1J	Frederick	Boulder
Carbondale Community School	K–8	1996	Roaring Fork School District RE-1	Carbondale	Garfield
Cardinal Community Academy	K–6	2000	Weld County School District RE-3J	Keenesburg	Weld
Cesar Chavez Academy (Pueblo, Colorado)	K–8	2001	Pueblo School District 60	Pueblo	Pueblo
Cesar Chavez Academy-Denver	K–8	2009	Denver Public Schools	Denver	Denver
Challenge to Excellence Charter School	K–8	2002	Douglas County School District RE-1	Parker	Douglas
Cherry Creek Academy	K–8	1995	Cherry Creek School District 5	Englewood	Arapahoe
CIVA Charter High School	9–12	1997	Colorado Springs School District 11	Colorado Springs	El Paso
The Classical Academy	K–12	1997	Academy School District 20	Colorado Springs	El Paso
Collegiate Academy of Colorado	K–12	1994	Jeffco Public Schools	Littleton	Jefferson
Colorado Calvert Academy	K–8	2010	Charter School Institute	Denver	Larimer
Colorado High School Charter	9–12	2002	Denver Public Schools	Denver	Denver
Colorado Springs Charter Academy	K–8	2005	Charter School Institute	Colorado Springs	El Paso
Colorado Springs Early Colleges	9–12	2007	Charter School Institute	Colorado Springs	El Paso
Colorado Virtual Academy	K–12	2001	Adams 12 Five Star Schools	Northglenn	Adams
Community Leadership Academy	K–8	2005	Adams County School District 14	Commerce City	Adams
Community Prep School	9–12	1995	Colorado Springs School District 11	Colorado Springs	El Paso
Compass Montessori, Golden Campus	P–12	2000	Jeffco Public Schools	Golden	Jefferson
Compass Montessori, Wheat Ridge Campus	P–6	1998	Jeffco Public Schools	Wheat Ridge	Jefferson
The Connect School	6–8	1993	Pueblo County School District 70	Pueblo	Pueblo
Corridor Community Academy	K–8	2004	Bennett School District 29J	Bennett	Adams
Crestone Charter School	K–12	1995	Moffat Consolidated School District 2	Crestone	Saguache
Crown Pointe Academy	K–8	1997	Adams County School District 50	Westminster	Adams
DCS Montessori School	P–6	1997	Douglas County School District RE-1	Castle Pines North	Douglas
Denver Justice High School	7–12	2009	Denver Public Schools	Denver	Denver
Denver Language School	K–8	2010	Denver Public Schools	Denver	Denver
Denver School of Science and Technology	6–12	2004	Denver Public Schools	Denver	Denver
Dolores Huerta Preparatory High	9–12	2004	Pueblo School District 60	Pueblo	Pueblo
Eagle County Charter Academy	K–8	1994	Eagle County School District RE-50	Edwards	Eagle
Eagle Ridge Academy High School	9–12	2010	Brighton School District 27J	Brighton	Adams
Early College of Arvada	6–12	2008	Charter School Institute	Arvada	Adams
Excel Academy (Arvada, Colorado)	K–8	1995	Jeffco Public Schools	Arvada	Jefferson
Flagstaff Academy	P–8	1997	St. Vrain Valley School District RE-1J	Longmont	Boulder
Foundations Academy	K–8	2011	Brighton School District 27J	Brighton	Adams
Free Horizon Montessori	P–6	2002	Jeffco Public Schools	Golden	Jefferson
Frontier Academy	K–12	1997	Weld County School District 6	Greeley	Weld
Frontier Charter Academy	K–6	2001	Calhan School District RJ-1	Calhan	El Paso
Georgetown Community School	P–6	2006	Clear Creek School District RE-1	Georgetown	Clear Creek
Girls Athletic Leadership School	6–8	2010	Denver Public Schools	Denver	Denver
Global Village Academy, Aurora Campus	K–8	2007	Aurora Public Schools	Aurora	Arapahoe
Global Village Academy, Northglenn Campus	K–4	2011	Adams 12 Five Star Schools	Northglenn	Adams
GLOBE Charter School	K–6	1995	Colorado Springs School District 11	Colorado Springs	El Paso
GOAL Academy	9–12	2008	Charter School Institute	Pueblo	Pueblo
Golden View Classical Academy	K–12	2015	Jefferson County School District	Golden	Jefferson
Guffey Community Charter School	P–8	1996	Park County School District RE-2	Guffey	Park
High Point Academy	P–8	2006	Charter School Institute	Aurora	Adams
Highline Academy Charter Schools	K–12	2004	Denver Public Schools	Denver	Denver
Hope Online Learning Academy Co-Op	K–12	2005	Douglas County School District RE-1	Englewood	Douglas
Horizons K–8 School	K–8	1997	Boulder Valley School District RE-2	Boulder	Boulder
Imagine Charter School at Firestone	P–8	2007	St. Vrain Valley School District RE-1J	Firestone	Boulder
Imagine Classical Academy at Indigo Ranch	K–8	2008	Falcon School District 49	Colorado Springs	El Paso
Independence Academy	K–8	2004	Mesa County Valley School District 51	Grand Junction	Mesa
Indian Peaks Charter School	K–8	2000	East Grand School District 2	Granby	Grand
James Irwin Charter Elementary School	K–5	2005	Harrison School District 2	Colorado Springs	El Paso
James Irwin Charter High School	9–12	2000	Harrison School District 2	Colorado Springs	El Paso
James Irwin Charter Middle School	6–8	2003	Harrison School District 2	Colorado Springs	El Paso
James Madison Charter Academy	K–6	2005	Widefield School District 3	Colorado Springs	El Paso
Jefferson Academy Elementary School	K–6	1994	Jeffco Public Schools	Broomfield	Jefferson
Jefferson Academy Secondary School	7–12	1994	Jeffco Public Schools	Broomfield	Jefferson
Juniper Ridge Community School	K–9	2012	Mesa County Valley School District 51	Grand Junction	Mesa
Justice High School (Lafayette, Colorado)	7–12	2006	Boulder Valley School District RE-2	Lafayette	Boulder
KIPP Denver Collegiate High School	9–12	2009	Denver Public Schools	Denver	Denver
KIPP Montbello College Prep Middle School	5–8	2011	Denver Public Schools	Denver	Denver
KIPP Sunshine Peak Academy	5–8	2002	Denver Public Schools	Denver	Denver
Knowledge Quest Academy	K–6	2002	Weld County School District RE-5J	Milliken	Weld
Lake George Charter School	P–8	1996	Park County School District RE-2	Lake George	Park
Landmark Academy at Reunion	K–8	2007	Brighton School District 27J	Commerce City	Adams
Launch High School	9–12	2016	Charter School Institute	Colorado Springs	El Paso
Legacy Academy	K–8	1997	Elizabeth School District C-1	Elizabeth	Elbert
Liberty Common High School	7–12	2010	Poudre School District R-1	Fort Collins	Larimer
Liberty Common School	K–6	1997	Poudre School District R-1	Fort Collins	Larimer
LifeSkills Center of Colorado Springs	9–12	2004	Colorado Springs School District 11	Colorado Springs	El Paso
LifeSkills Center of Denver	9–12	2003	Denver Public Schools	Denver	Denver
Lincoln Academy (Arvada, Colorado)	P–8	1997	Jeffco Public Schools	Arvada	Jefferson
Littleton Academy	K–8	1996	Littleton Public Schools	Littleton	Arapahoe
Littleton Preparatory Charter School	K–8	1998	Littleton Public Schools	Littleton	Arapahoe
Lotus School for Excellence	K–12	2006	Aurora Public Schools	Aurora	Arapahoe
Manny Martinez Middle School	6–8	2009	Denver Public Schools	Denver	Denver
Marble Charter School	K–10	1995	Gunnison Watershed School District RE1J	Marble	Gunnison
Montessori Peaks Academy	P–6	1997	Jeffco Public Schools	Littleton	Jefferson
Monument Academy	P–8	1996	Lewis-Palmer School District 38	Monument	El Paso
Mountain Middle School	6–8	2011	Durango School District 9-R	Durango	La Plata
Mountain Phoenix Community School	K–8	2007	Jeffco Public Schools	Golden	Jefferson
Mountain View Core Knowledge School	K–8	1996	Cañon City Schools	Canon City	Fremont
New America School, Aurora Campus	9–12	2004	Aurora Public Schools	Denver	Denver
New America School, Denver Campus	9–12	2004	Mapleton Public Schools	Denver	Adams
New America School, Lakewood Campus	9–12	2006	Jeffco Public Schools	Lakewood	Jefferson
New Legacy Charter School	9–12	2015	Charter School Institute	Aurora	Adams
New Vision Charter School	K–8	2006	Thompson School District R-2J	Loveland	Larimer
North Fork Community Montessori School	P–6	2000	Delta County School District 50J	Hotchkiss	Delta
North Routt Community Charter School	K–8	2001	Steamboat Springs School District RE-2	Clark	Routt
North Star Academy (Parker, Colorado)	K–8	2006	Douglas County School District RE-1	Parker	Douglas
Northeast Academy Charter School	K–8	2004	Denver Public Schools	Denver	Denver
The Odyssey School	K–8	1998	Denver Public Schools	Denver	Denver
Omar D. Blair Charter School	K–8	2004	Denver Public Schools	Denver	Denver
P.S. 1 Charter School	6–12	1995	Denver Public Schools	Denver	Denver
Paradox Valley School	P–8	1999	West End School District RE-2	Paradox	Montrose
Parker Core Knowledge Charter School	K–8	1994	Douglas County School District RE-1	Parker	Douglas
Passage Charter School	9–12	1998	Montrose County School District RE-1J	Montrose	Montrose
Peak to Peak Charter School	K–12	2000	Boulder Valley School District RE-2	Lafayette	Boulder
Pikes Peak Prep	K–12	2005	Charter School Institute	Colorado Springs	El Paso
Pikes Peak School of Expeditionary Learning	K–8	2000	Falcon School District 49	Falcon	El Paso
Pinnacle Charter School	K–12	1997	Charter School Institute	Federal Heights	Adams
Pioneer Charter School	P–6	1997	Denver Public Schools	Denver	Denver
Platte River Academy	K–8	1997	Douglas County School District RE-1	Highlands Ranch	Douglas
Prairie Creeks Charter School	9–12	1998	Strasburg School District 31J	Strasburg	Adams
Prospect Ridge Academy	K–12	2011	Adams 12 Five Star Schools	Broomfield	Adams
Provost Academy Colorado	9–12	2010	Charter School Institute	Greenwood Village	El Paso
Pueblo School for Arts and Sciences - Jones Campus	K–8	1993	Pueblo School District 60	Pueblo	Pueblo
Pueblo School for Arts and Sciences - Fulton Heights Campus	K–8	2017	Pueblo School District 60	Pueblo	Pueblo
Pueblo School for Arts and Sciences - Pueblo Classical Academy	5-9	2021	Education reEnvisioned BOCES	Pueblo	Pueblo
Ricardo Flores Magón Academy	K–8	2007	Charter School Institute	Westminster	Adams
Ridge View Academy	9–12	2001	Denver Public Schools	Watkins	Denver
Ridgeview Classical Schools	K–12	2001	Poudre School District R-1	Fort Collins	Larimer
Rocky Mountain Academy of Evergreen	P–8	2001	Jeffco Public Schools	Evergreen	Jefferson
Rocky Mountain Classical Academy	K–12	2001	Falcon School District 49	Colorado Springs	El Paso
Rocky Mountain Deaf School	P–12	1997	Jeffco Public Schools	Golden	Jefferson
Roosevelt-Edison Charter School	K–5	1996	Colorado Springs School District 11	Colorado Springs	El Paso
Ross Montessori School	P–8	2005	Charter School Institute	Carbondale	Garfield
SkyView Academy	P–12	2010	Douglas County School District RE-1	Highlands Ranch	Douglas
SOAR at Green Valley Ranch	K–5	2010	Denver Public Schools	Denver	Denver
Southwest Early College High School	9–12	2004	Denver Public Schools	Denver	Denver
Southwest Open School	6–12	1999	Montezuma-Cortez School District RE-1	Cortez	Montezuma
St. Vrain Community Montessori School	P–6	2009	St. Vrain Valley School District RE-1J	Longmont	Boulder
STAR Academy	K–8	2007	Colorado Springs School District 11	Colorado Springs	El Paso
Stargate School	K–8	1994	Adams 12 Five Star Schools	Thornton	Adams
STEM School	6–11	2011	Douglas County School District RE-1	Highlands Ranch	Douglas
Stone Creek Charter School	K–8	2006	Charter School Institute	Avon	Eagle
Summit Middle School (Boulder, Colorado)	6–8	1994	Boulder Valley School District RE-2	Boulder	Boulder
Swallows Charter Academy	K–12	1998	Pueblo County School District 70	Pueblo West	Pueblo
T.R. Paul Academy of Arts and Knowledge	K–8	2006	Charter School Institute	Fort Collins	Larimer
Thomas MacLaren School	6–12	2009	Charter School Institute	Colorado Springs	El Paso
Twin Peaks Charter Academy	K–8	1997	St. Vrain Valley School District RE-1J	Longmont	Boulder
Two Roads High School	9–12	2010	Jeffco Public Schools	Arvada	Jefferson
Union Colony Preparatory School	6–12	1997	Weld County School District 6	Greeley	Weld
University Preparatory School	K–5	2011	Denver Public Schools	Denver	Denver
University Schools	K–12	1999	Weld County School District 6	Greeley	Weld
Vanguard Classical School	K–8	2007	Aurora Public Schools	Denver	Denver
The Vanguard School	K–12	1995	Cheyenne Mountain School District 12	Colorado Springs	El Paso
Venture Prep Charter Schools	6–12	2009	Denver Public Schools	Denver	Denver
Vista Charter School	9–12	2004	Montrose County School District RE-1J	Montrose	Montrose
West Denver Preparatory Charter School	6–8	2006	Denver Public Schools	Denver	Denver
Westgate Community School	K–8	2009	Adams 12 Five Star Schools	Northglenn	Adams
Windsor Charter Academy	K–8	2001	Weld County School District RE-4	Windsor	Weld
Woodrow Wilson Academy	K–8	2000	Jeffco Public Schools	Westminster	Jefferson
Wyatt-Edison Charter School	K–8	1998	Denver Public Schools	Denver	Denver
Youth and Family Academy	7–12	1995	Pueblo School District 60	Pueblo	Pueblo

== See also ==
- Bibliography of Colorado
- Geography of Colorado
- History of Colorado
- Index of Colorado-related articles
- List of Colorado-related lists
- Outline of Colorado
