= List of people from Colorado Springs, Colorado =

Coordinates: 38.8339°N 104.8214°W

Location of Colorado Springs in Colorado

This is a list of some notable people who have lived in the City of Colorado Springs, Colorado, United States. Colorado Springs, the second-largest city in Colorado and the county seat of El Paso County, Colorado, United States, has been the birthplace and home of several notable individuals. This list of people from Colorado Springs includes people who were born or lived in the city. Individuals included in this list are people presumed to be notable because they have received significant coverage in reliable sources that are independent of the subject.^{[A]}

== Agriculture ==
- Nick Venetucci (1911–2004), philanthropist who donated over 1 million pumpkins to children

== Arts and entertainment ==
=== Art ===
- Charles Ragland Bunnell (1897–1968), painter, printmaker, and muralist
- Starr Kempf (1917–1995), sculptor
- Andrew Kwon, fashion designer
- Maxfield Parrish (1870–1966), painter; worked and studied in Colorado Springs
- Charles M. Schulz (1922–2000), creator of Peanuts cartoon strip; lived in Colorado Springs in the 1950s
- Artus Van Briggle (1869–1904), Art Nouveau potter
- Elizabeth Wright Ingraham (1922–2013), architect

=== Literature and poetry ===
- Robert A. Heinlein (1907–1988), science-fiction author
- Helen Hunt Jackson (1830–1885), author
- Stanley Krueber (1892–1987), pulp fiction author; buried in Colorado Springs
- Beverly Lewis (born 1949), novelist, known for her stories of Amish life
- Michelle Malkin (born 1970), conservative author, commentator and blogger, moved to Colorado Springs in 2008
- Nellie Burget Miller (1875–1952), Poet Laureate of Colorado
- Stanley Mullen (1911–1974), short story writer, novelist and publisher
- Michael A. O'Donnell (born 1956), award-winning author, Ph.D
- Leonard Peikoff (born 1933), philosopher and heir to Ayn Rand estate
- John E. Stith (born 1947), science-fiction and mystery author, has lived here since 1970s
- Frank Waters (1902–1995), author and journalist, born here

=== Modeling ===
- Leeann Tweeden (born 1973), model, worked briefly as a waitress at a local Hooters in 1991–92
- Paul Vandervort (born 1985), model, was with the Janice Dickinson Modelling Agency, is from Colorado Springs

=== Music and comedy ===
- Lewis Black (born 1948), comedian, lived briefly in Colorado Springs with college friends as part-owner of a small theater
- Zach Filkins (born 1978), lead guitarist of OneRepublic
- Tom Hamilton (born 1951), Aerosmith bassist, born in Colorado Springs
- Keith Lockhart (born 1959), former conductor of Pikes Peak Symphony, current conductor of Boston Pops
- Max Morath (1926–2023), ragtime pianist, born in Colorado Springs
- OneRepublic, pop-rock band
- Günther Johannes Paetsch (1929–1997), co-founder of the Paetsch Family Chamber Music Ensemble in Colorado Springs
- Johann Sebastian Paetsch (born 1964), cellist, born and raised in Colorado Springs
- Jag Panzer, power metal band
- Black Pegasus (born 1980), hip hop and rap artist, songwriter, label owner, and entertainment company owner
- The Procussions, hip hop group originating from Colorado Springs; original lineup included Mr. J. Medeiros, Stro Elliot, Rez, Vice Versa, and Q; group now consists of Mr. J. Medeiros and Stro Elliot
- Johnny Smith (1922–2013), jazz guitarist
- Ryan Tedder (born 1979), lead singer of OneRepublic
- Laura Veirs (born 1973), singer
- YTCracker (born 1982), pioneering nerdcore artist and former computer hacker

=== Television, theater, and film ===
- Juli Ashton (born 1969), actress
- Kelly Bishop (born 1944), actress
- Michael Boatman (born 1964), actor
- Spring Byington (1886–1971), actress
- Lon Chaney (1883–1930), silent film star; born in Colorado Springs; Lon Chaney Theatre is named for him
- Duane Chapman (born 1953), from Dog the Bounty Hunter
- Marceline Day (1908–2000), actress
- Chris Fowler (born 1962), sportscaster and ESPN College GameDay football host
- Dustin Hodge (born 1977), television writer and producer, worked for KKTV
- Clinton Jencks (1918–2005), actor and activist
- Joe Kenda (born 1946), former Colorado Springs Police Department detective featured on Investigation Discovery television show Homicide Hunter
- Chase Masterson (born 1963), actress
- Sherry Stringfield (born 1967), actress
- Stephen Thomas Ochsner (born 1988), actor, director, musician, artist, translator, and producer
- Cassandra Peterson (born 1951), actress, graduated in 1969 from General William J. Palmer High School in Colorado Springs
- Sydney Pollack (1934–2008), actor and Academy Award-winning director, worked downtown during a stint at Fort Carson
- Chris Sanders (born 1962), filmmaker, illustrator, and voice actor
- Melanie Watson Bernhardt (1968–2025), actress and disability advocate
- Hillary Wolf (born 1977), actress and Olympian, currently lives in Colorado Springs

=== Video game designers ===
- John Romero

== Military ==
- Thomas D. Finley, U.S. Army major general, retired to Colorado Springs

== Politics ==
- George M. Borg, member of the Wisconsin State Senate and Wisconsin State Assembly
- William A. Conant, member of the New York State Assembly
- Jeff Crank, U.S. representative
- John Dingell, U.S. representative
- Henry W. Hoagland, political activist
- Doug Lamborn, former U.S. representative, Colorado state senator, and state representative
- Scott Walker, governor of Wisconsin (2011–2019)

== Religion ==
- James Dobson, Focus on the Family founder
- Ted Haggard, New Life Church founder
- Rev. Michael A. O'Donnell, Ph.D., former Priest-in-Charge of Grace and St. Stephen's Episcopal Church
- Elizabeth Clare Prophet, founder of Church Universal and Triumphant; she and her husband Mark L. Prophet operated The Summit Lighthouse in the Broadmoor neighborhood, 1966–1976
- Mark L. Prophet, with wife Elizabeth Clare Prophet operated The Summit Lighthouse in the Broadmoor neighborhood, 1966–1976
- Dawson Trotman, founder of parachurch Christian organization The Navigators

== Science, technology, and industry ==
- Albert E. Carlton, investor in Colorado banks, mines and railroads
- Seymour Cray, founder of Cray Research, lived and died in Colorado Springs
- J.J. Hagerman, mining and railroad industrialist, expanded the Colorado Midland Railway while living in Colorado Springs
- Myra Keen, malacologist
- Ancel Keys, physiologist, born in Colorado Springs
- Warren P. Mason, electrical engineer and physicist, born in Colorado Springs
- Mary Jane (Merten) Osborn, microbiologist and biochemist, born in Colorado Springs
- William Jackson Palmer, a founder of the city and developer of the Denver & Rio Grande Railroad
- Talcott Parsons, sociologist
- Kenneth Sims, geologist, born in Colorado Springs
- Winfield Scott Stratton, prospector and philanthropist
- Nikola Tesla, electrical engineer, lived in Colorado Springs
- Charles L. Tutt Sr., mine owner, ore miller and philanthropist

=== Astronauts ===
- James Dutton, lives in Colorado Springs
- James Irwin, lived in Colorado Springs
- Dorothy Metcalf-Lindenburger, born in Colorado Springs

== Sports ==
=== Baseball ===
- Goose Gossage (born 1951), Hall of Fame pitcher; born in Colorado Springs; graduated from Wasson High School; currently lives in Colorado Springs
- Jeffery King (born 1964), Major League Baseball infielder Pittsburgh Pirates, Kansas City Royals; graduated from Rampart High School in Colorado Springs

=== Basketball ===
- Lynn Barry, basketball player and USA Basketball executive, lives in Colorado Springs
- Rick Barry, NBA Hall of Famer; lives in Colorado Springs
- Nique Clifford, NBA player, Sacramento Kings; attended The Vanguard School
- Reggie Jackson, NBA player, Denver Nuggets; attended Palmer High School
- Danielle Page, Olympic bronze medalist; European champion as part of the Serbian women's national team

=== Combat sports ===
- Henry Cejudo, Olympic gold medalist; graduated from Coronado High School in Colorado Springs
- Donald Cerrone, UFC fighter; attended Air Academy High School
- Benson Henderson, mixed martial artist; born in Colorado Springs
- Bobby Lashley, WWE wrestler; is billed from Colorado Springs
- Bob "The Beast" Sapp, kickboxer, wrestler and actor; born in Colorado Springs and attended Mitchell High School
- Michelle Waterson, mixed martial artist; born in Colorado Springs

=== Figure skating ===
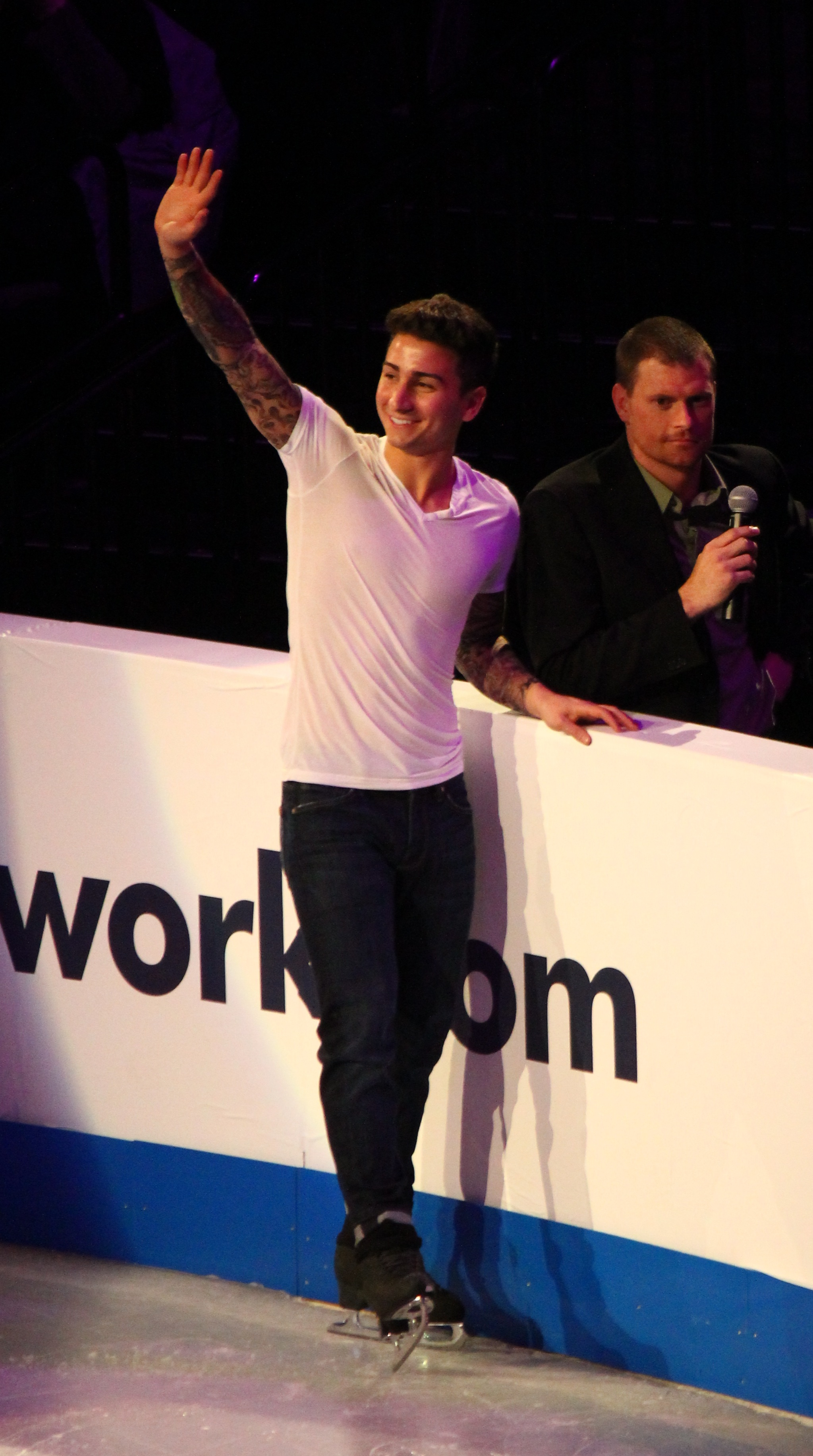
Max Aaron

- Max Aaron (born 1992), 2013 U.S. national champion figure skater
- John Coughlin (1985–2019), figure skater
- Alexa Knierim and Chris Knierim, Olympic figure skaters, 2018 Olympic bronze medalists, 2015 and 2018 U.S. national champions
- Jill Trenary, figure skater; trained and lived in Colorado Springs

=== Football ===
- Roc Alexander, NFL cornerback
- Cullen Bryant, NFL running back for the Los Angeles Rams; graduated from William (Billy) Mitchell High School
- Earl "Dutch" Clark, football player; graduated from Colorado College
- Jack Evans, NFL quarterback for the Green Bay Packers
- Barry Helton, NFL punter for the San Francisco 49ers
- Lamarr Houston, NFL defensive end for the Chicago Bears; graduated from Doherty High School
- Vincent Jackson, NFL wide receiver for the Tampa Bay Buccaneers; graduated from Widefield High School
- Steve Sabol, NFL Films co-founder; attended Colorado College near downtown Colorado Springs
- Matt Slauson, NFL offensive lineman; graduated from Air Academy High School
- Aaron Smith, NFL defensive end for the Pittsburgh Steelers

=== Ice hockey ===
- Brandon Carlo, professional hockey player
- David Hale, professional hockey player; born in Colorado Springs
- Jim Johannson, ice hockey player, coach and USA Hockey executive
- Dave Peterson, coach of the United States men's national ice hockey team and USA Hockey executive

=== Soccer ===
- Bryce Boarman, cerebral palsy soccer player and 2012 Paralympian
- James Riley, defender
- Ally Watt, forward

=== Other sports and competitive events ===
- Christopher Dean, British former Olympic ice dancer, 1984 Olympic Champion, 1994 Olympic bronze medalist
- Robert Griswold (born 1996), swimmer
- Sarah Hirshland (born 1975), chief executive officer of the United States Olympic Committee
- Steve O'Dwyer, professional poker player
- Arlene Pieper, first woman to complete a U.S. marathon
- Bill Roy, former Olympian and world champion skeet shooter
- Keith Sanderson (born 1975), sport shooter
- Susan Beth Scott, Paralympic swimmer, bronze medalist in London 2012 and Beijing 2008 Paralympic Games
- Bobby Unser, automobile racer, born in Colorado Springs

== Other ==
- Renée Nicole Macklin Good (1988 or 1989–2026), American citizen killed by a US ICE agent in Minneapolis, MN on January 7, 2026
- Mohamed Sabry Soliman (born 1979), Egyptian suspect in the 2025 Boulder fire attack

== See also ==
- List of people from Colorado
- Bibliography of Colorado
- Geography of Colorado
- History of Colorado
- Index of Colorado-related articles
- List of Colorado-related lists
- Outline of Colorado
