= Southwest Early College =

Southwest Early College can refer to:

- Southwest Early College (Denver, Colorado), a charter high school in Denver, Colorado, United States
- Southwest Early College Campus, a high school in Kansas City, Missouri, United States
