= Aaron Smith (defensive end) =

American football player (born 1976)

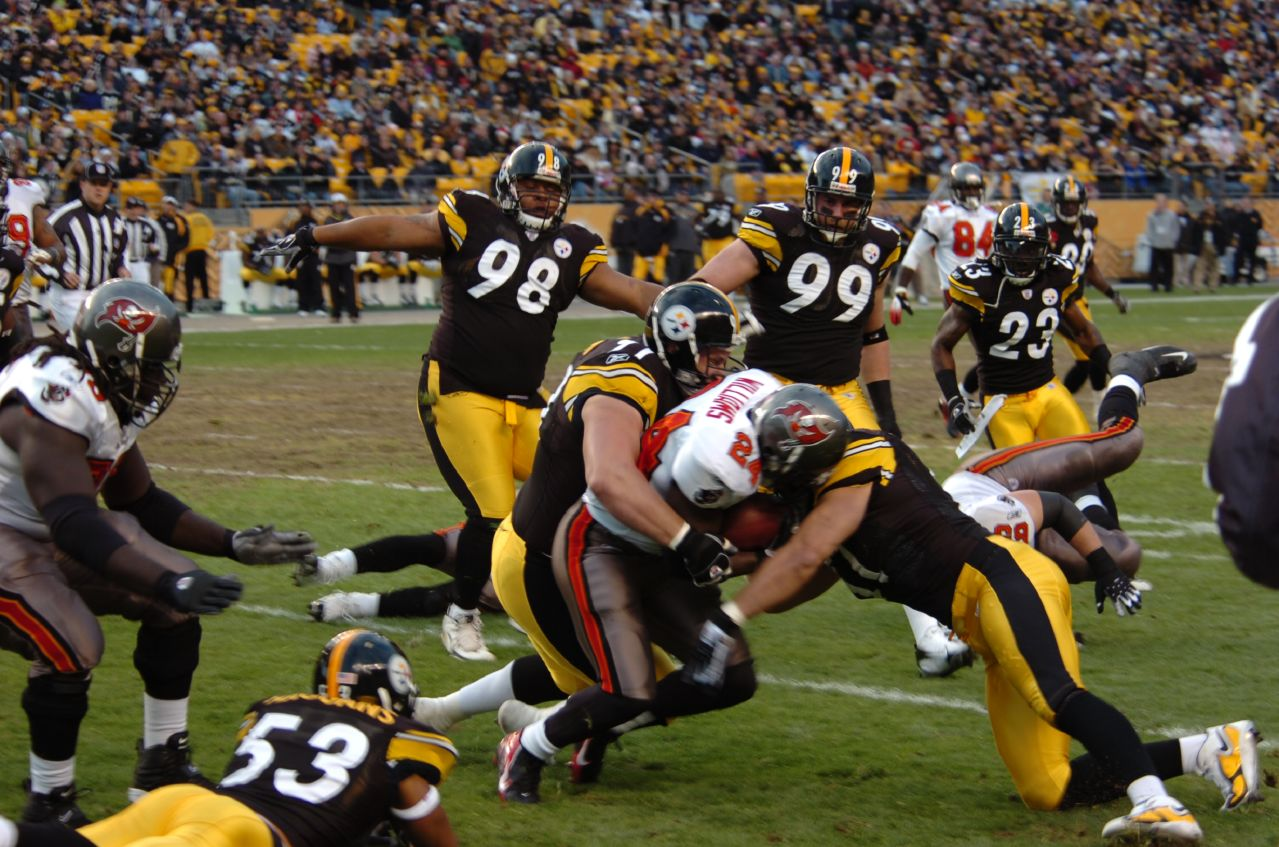
- Smith (left center) helps make a tackle in 2006, behind him are Casey Hampton #98 and Brett Keisel #99

No. 91
- Position: Defensive end

Personal information
- Born: April 19, 1976 (age 50); Colorado Springs, Colorado, U.S.
- Listed height: 6 ft 5 in (1.96 m)
- Listed weight: 298 lb (135 kg)

Career information
- High school: Sierra (Colorado Springs)
- College: Northern Colorado
- NFL draft: 1999: 4th round, 109th overall pick

Career history
- Pittsburgh Steelers (1999–2011)

Awards and highlights
- 2× NCAA Division II National Champion (1996, 1997); 2× Super Bowl champion (XL, XLIII); Pro Bowl (2004); Sports Illustrated 2000s All Decade Team; Pittsburgh Steelers Hall of Honor; Northern Colorado Bears No. 91 retired

Career NFL statistics
- Total tackles: 481
- Sacks: 44
- Forced fumbles: 7
- Fumble recoveries: 9
- Interceptions: 1
- Stats at Pro Football Reference

Aaron Douglas Smith (born April 19, 1976) is an American former professional football player who was a defensive end for the Pittsburgh Steelers of the National Football League (NFL). He was selected in the fourth round of the 1999 NFL draft by the Steelers and played for the team for thirteen seasons. He played college football for the Northern Colorado Bears.

== High School career ==
Smith was a consensus All-State selection at Sierra High School in Colorado Springs, Colorado, he also lettered in basketball and was a two-time All-Conference choice in both sports.

== College career ==
Smith decided to commit to Northern Colorado where he anchored the defensive line during the programs golden era, helping lead the Bears to back-to-back NCAA Division II football championships in 1996 and 1997.

He led the Bears in sacks during all four of his playing seasons, establishing a commanding program record with 46 career sacks. During his 1997 campaign he set a single season school record with 22 sacks, earning North Central Conference Most Valuable Defensive Lineman and first-team all-conference honors in 1997 and 1998.

Smith still holds the school record for most sacks in a season (22) and in a career (46). His 234 career tackles place him 15th on the Bears all-time list.

== Professional career ==
Pre-draft measurables
Height	Weight	Arm length	Hand span	40-yard dash	10-yard split	20-yard split	20-yard shuttle	Three-cone drill	Vertical jump	Broad jump	Bench press
6 ft 5 1/8 in (1.96 m)	279 lb (127 kg)	32 in (0.81 m)	10 1/8 in (0.26 m)	5.07 s	1.72 s	2.91 s	4.34 s	7.48 s	29.5 in (0.75 m)	9 ft 2 in (2.79 m)	19 reps
All values from NFL Combine

Smith was selected by the Pittsburgh Steelers in the fourth round, 109th pick overall, of the 1999 NFL draft. Smith played in every Steelers' game at left defensive end from 2000 through 2006. Smith has been considered an ideal defensive end in Pittsburgh's 3–4 defense. Smith won a Super Bowl ring with the Steelers in Super Bowl XL, during the 2005 season. He recorded four tackles throughout the game. After the 2008 season, Smith won another ring with the Steelers in Super Bowl XLIII.

On February 27, 2007, the Steelers resigned Smith to a 5-year, US$25 million contract. Through the 2007 season, Smith ranks ninth all-time on the Steelers sacks list. After missing parts of three games with a knee injury early in the 2007 season, Smith missed the last four games due to a torn biceps muscle while playing against the New England Patriots in early December. He made a full recovery from the injury and returned to his starting position in 2008, recording 44 tackles and 5.5 sacks.

In 2009, Smith played in Pittsburgh's first five games before sustaining a torn rotator cuff in an Oct 10 win over the Detroit Lions. On Oct 14, the Steelers placed Smith on the injured reserve list, ending his 2009 season. He was hurt again in 2010, playing in only 6 games, replaced by Ziggy Hood. In 2011, he played in 4 games before being placed on the injured reserve list for a neck injury, marking the third time in three years that he had been placed on the injured reserve list. He was released on March 2, 2012.

On August 3, 2012, during a ceremony in Latrobe, Pennsylvania, Smith officially retired from the NFL.

In 2017, Smith served as an assistant football & basketball coach at North Allegheny Senior High School in Wexford, Pennsylvania.

On July 29, 2023, Smith was named to the Pittsburgh Steelers Hall of Honor.

== Personal life ==
Smith and his wife, Jaimie, are devout Christians who first came to know Christ while Smith was on the Steelers. Smith has experienced great joy in following Christ, saying during an interview:

The joy Christ gives me - I’m always happy. You can’t take my joy away. No matter what happens in life. We’re talking about your eternal salvation. We’re talking about spending the rest of your life, after you pass away, in heaven with the Lord. That’s the biggest decision you’ll ever make in your life. Life isn’t going to be perfect. But you’ll have someone to do it with you. You’re not doing it by yourself. Christ is right there with you the whole time. It’s the biggest thing you’ll ever do in your life. And it’s the greatest thing you’ll ever do, is to come to know and accept Jesus Christ as your Savior.

Smith has three brothers named David, Stephan, and Kevin.

Smith and his wife Jaimie have five children: daughters Elliana, Elysia, and Emilia and sons Ezekiel and Elijiah. His son Elijiah suffered from acute lymphoblastic leukemia but completed his treatments successfully and is now cancer-free.
