= Scifres =

Scifres is a surname. Notable people with the name include:

- Mike Scifres (born 1980), American football player
- Steve Scifres (born 1972), American football player
