= List of school districts in Colorado =

List of school districts in the U.S. State of Colorado

Coordinates: 38.9972°N 105.5478°W

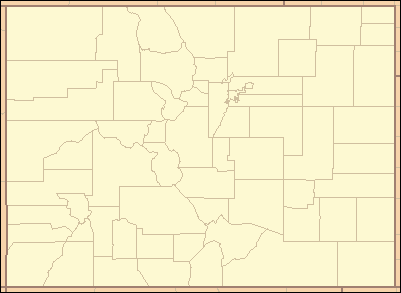
The 64 counties of the U.S. State of Colorado.

This is a list of the 179 public school districts in the U.S. state of Colorado.

All school districts in the state are independent governments. Colorado has no public school systems dependent on another layer of government.

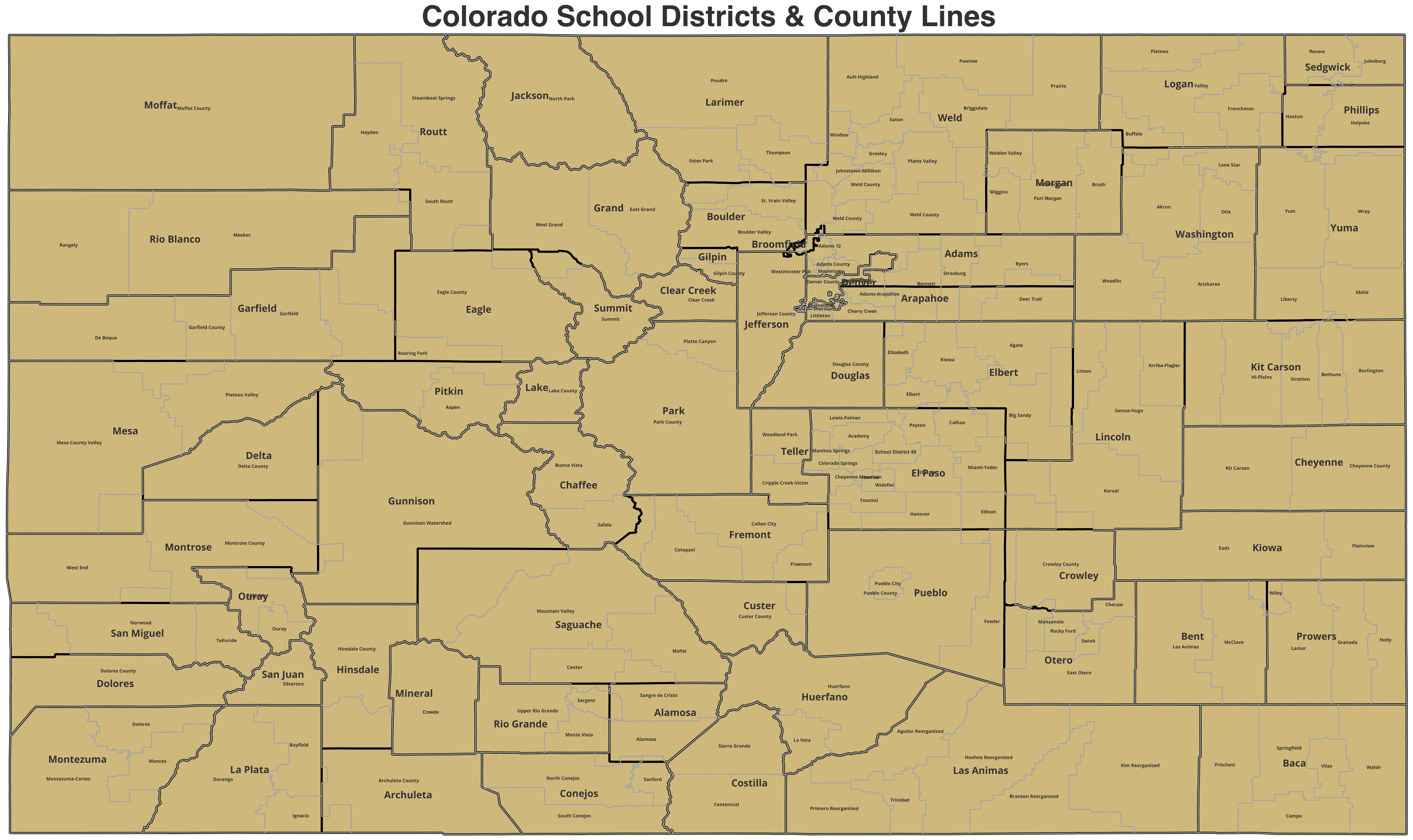
Colorado school districts and county lines

== School districts ==
Public school district	Students (Note: Student enrollment for the 2021-2022 academic year.)	Primary county	Secondary county
Academy School District 20	26,400	El Paso	
Adams 12 Five Star Schools	36,078	Adams	Broomfield
Adams County School District 14	6,114	Adams	
Adams-Arapahoe School District 28J	38,451	Arapahoe	Adams
Agate School District 300	84	Elbert	
Aguilar Reorganized School District RE-6	114	Las Animas	
Akron School District R-1	411	Washington	
Alamosa School District RE-11J	2,188	Alamosa	
Archuleta County School District 50 JT	1,712	Archuleta	
Arickaree School District R-2	101	Washington	
Arriba-Flagler Consolidated School District 20	139	Kit Carson	
Aspen School District 1	1,652	Pitkin	
Ault-Highland School District RE-9	1,013	Weld	
Bayfield School District 10 JT-R	1,311	La Plata	
Bennett School District 29J	1,249	Adams	
Bethune School District R-5	108	Kit Carson	
Big Sandy School District 100J	325	Elbert	
Boulder Valley School District RE-2	29,011	Boulder	Broomfield
Branson Reorganized School District RE-82	502	Las Animas	
Briggsdale School District RE-10J	186	Weld	
Brush School District RE-2J	1,394	Morgan	
Buena Vista School District R-31	1,052	Chaffee	
Buffalo School District RE-4J	305	Logan	
Burlington Public School District RE-6J	749	Kit Carson	
Byers School District 32J	5,352	Arapahoe	
Calhan School District RJ-1	446	El Paso	
Campo School District RE-6	51	Baca	
Centennial School District R-1	203	Costilla	
Center Consolidated School District 26 JT	617	Saguache	Alamosa; Rio Grande
Charter School Institute	21,947	statewide	
Cheraw School District 31	231	Otero	
Cherry Creek School District 5	53,558	Arapahoe	
Cheyenne County School District RE-5	188	Cheyenne	
Cheyenne Mountain School District 12	3,641	El Paso	
Clear Creek School District RE-1	696	Clear Creek	
Colorado Springs School District 11	23,366	El Paso	
Cotopaxi School District RE-3	208	Fremont	
Creede School District	78	Mineral	
Cripple Creek-Victor School District RE-1	352	Teller	
Crowley County School District RE-1-J	405	Crowley	
Custer County School District C-1	361	Custer	
DeBeque School District 49-JT	172	Mesa	Garfield
Deer Trail School District 26J	295	Arapahoe	
Delta County School District 50J	4,738	Delta	Gunnison; Mesa; Montrose
Denver County School District 1	88,889	Denver	
Dolores County School District RE-2J	254	Dolores	
Dolores School District RE-4A	726	Montezuma	
Douglas County School District RE-1	63,876	Douglas	
Durango School District 9-R	5,797	La Plata	
Eads School District RE-1	219	Kiowa	
Eagle County School District RE-50	6,689	Eagle	
East Grand School District 2	1,286	Grand	
East Otero School District R-1	1,358	Otero	
Eaton School District RE-2	1,994	Weld	
Edison School District 54JT	137	El Paso	Lincoln; Pueblo
El Paso County School District 49	24,767	El Paso	
Elbert School District 200	281	Elbert	
Elizabeth School District C-1	2,412	Elbert	
Ellicott School District 22	1,002	El Paso	
Englewood School District 1	2,440	Arapahoe	
Estes Park School District R-3	1,058	Larimer	
Fort Morgan School District RE-3	3,381	Morgan	
Fountain School District 8	8,302	El Paso	
Fowler School District R4J	366	Otero	
Fremont School District RE-1	3,325	Fremont	
Fremont RE-2 School District	1,426	Fremont	
Frenchman School District RE-3	217	Logan	
Garfield County School District 16	1,225	Garfield	
Garfield School District RE-2	4,614	Garfield	
Genoa-Hugo School District C-113	213	Lincoln	
Gilpin County School District RE-1	437	Gilpin	
Granada School District RE-1	196	Prowers	
Greeley-Evans School District 6	22,170	Weld	
Gunnison Watershed School District RE1J	2,081	Gunnison	
Hanover School District 28	283	El Paso	
Harrison School District 2	13,002	El Paso	
Haxtun School District RE-2J	341	Phillips	
Hayden School District RE-1	436	Routt	
Hi-Plains School District R-23	153	Kit Carson	
Hinsdale County School District RE-1	77	Hinsdale	
Hoehne Reorganized School District RE-3	314	Las Animas	
Holly School District RE-3	275	Prowers	
Holyoke School District RE-1J	578	Phillips	
Huerfano School District RE-1	512	Huerfano	
Idalia School District RJ-3	186	Yuma	
Ignacio School District 11-JT	640	La Plata	
Jefferson County School District R-1	78,473	Jefferson	Broomfield
Johnstown-Milliken School District RE-5J	3,783	Weld	
Julesburg School District RE-1	775	Sedgwick	
Karval School District RE-23	43	Lincoln	
Kim Reorganized School District RE-88	32	Las Animas	
Kiowa School District C-2	276	Elbert	
Kit Carson School District R-1	100	Cheyenne	
La Veta School District RE-2	207	Huerfano	
Lake County School District R-1	1,010	Lake	
Lamar School District RE-2	1,573	Prowers	
Las Animas School District RE-1	826	Bent	
Lewis-Palmer School District 38	6,637	El Paso	
Liberty School District J-4	64	Yuma	
Limon School District RE-4J	448	Lincoln	
Littleton School District 6	13,698	Arapahoe	
Lone Star School District 101	125	Washington	
Mancos School District RE-6	485	Montezuma	
Manitou Springs School District 14	1,329	El Paso	
Manzanola School District 3J	151	Otero	
Mapleton School District 1	9,002	Adams	
McClave School District RE-2	237	Bent	
Meeker School District RE-1	724	Rio Blanco	
Mesa County Valley School District 51	21,315	Mesa	
Miami-Yoder School District JT-60	313	El Paso	Elbert; Lincoln
Moffat Consolidated School District 2	217	Saguache	
Moffat County School District RE-1	2,118	Moffat	
Monte Vista School District C-8	1,074	Rio Grande	
Montezuma-Cortez School District RE-1	2,618	Montezuma	
Montrose County School District RE-1J	6,061	Montrose	
Mountain Valley School District RE-1	185	Saguache	
North Conejos School District RE-1J	1,005	Conejos	
North Park School District R-1	173	Jackson	
Norwood School District R-2J	199	San Miguel	
Otis School District R-3	211	Washington	
Ouray School District R-1	189	Ouray	
Park County School District RE-2	596	Park	
Pawnee School District RE-12	70	Weld	
Peyton School District 23-JT	614	El Paso	
Plainview School District RE-2	137	Kiowa	
Plateau School District RE-5	160	Logan	
Plateau Valley School District 50	305	Mesa	
Platte Canyon School District 1	837	Park	
Platte Valley School District RE-7	1,078	Weld	
Poudre School District R-1	29,941	Larimer	
Prairie School District RE-11	191	Weld	
Primero Reorganized School District RE-2	228	Las Animas	
Pritchett School District RE-3	66	Baca	
Pueblo School District 60	15,134	Pueblo	
Pueblo County School District 70	10,247	Pueblo	
Rangely School District RE-4	494	Rio Blanco	
Revere School District RE-3	133	Sedgwick	
Ridgway School District R-2	335	Ouray	
Roaring Fork School District RE-1	5,306	Garfield	
Rocky Ford School District R-2	676	Otero	
Salida School District R-32	1,313	Chaffee	
Sanford School District 6J	369	Conejos	
Sangre de Cristo School District RE-22J	246	Alamosa	
Sargent School District RE-33J	330	Rio Grande	
School District 27J	20,338	Adams	
Sheridan School District 2	1,177	Arapahoe	
Sierra Grande School District R-30	259	Costilla	
Silverton School District 1	86	San Juan	
South Conejos School District RE-10	149	Conejos	
South Routt School District RE-3	339	Routt	
Springfield School District RE-4	278	Baca	
St. Vrain Valley School District RE-1J	32,406	Boulder	Broomfield; Larimer; Weld
Steamboat Springs School District RE-2	2,640	Routt	
Strasburg School District 31J	1,171	Adams	
Stratton School District R-4	231	Kit Carson	
Summit School District RE-1	3,620	Summit	
Swink School District 33	312	Otero	
Telluride School District R-1	876	San Miguel	
Thompson School District R-2J	15,291	Larimer	
Trinidad School District 1	789	Las Animas	
Upper Rio Grande School District C-7	403	Rio Grande	
Valley School District RE-1	1,996	Logan	
Vilas School District RE-5	222	Baca	
Walsh School District RE-1	161	Baca	
Weld County School District RE-1	1,892	Weld	
Weld County School District RE-3J	2,693	Weld	
Weld County School District RE-8	2,482	Weld	
Weldon Valley School District RE-20J	225	Morgan	
West End School District RE-2	272	Montrose	
West Grand School District 1-JT	393	Grand	
Westminster School District 50	8,320	Adams	
Widefield School District 3	9,370	El Paso	
Wiggins School District RE-50J	819	Morgan	
Wiley School District RE-13-JT	262	Prowers	
Weld County School District RE-4	8,549	Weld	
Woodland Park School District RE-2	1,832	Teller	
Woodlin School District R-104	72	Washington	
Wray School District RD-2	749	Yuma	
Yuma School District 1	876	Yuma	

== See also ==
- Bibliography of Colorado
- Geography of Colorado
- History of Colorado
- Index of Colorado-related articles
- List of Colorado-related lists
- Outline of Colorado
