= Aspen High School =

Location
- 235 High School Road; Aspen, Colorado 81611; United States; 39°11′24″N 106°50′55″W

Information
- Type: Public high school
- School district: Aspen 1
- CEEB code: 060060
- NCES School ID: 080228000047
- Principal: Sarah Strassburger
- Teaching staff: 44.58 (on an FTE basis)
- Grades: 9–12
- Gender: Coeducational
- Enrollment: 559 (2024–2025)
- Student to teacher ratio: 12.54
- Campus type: Town, Remote
- Colors: Red and Black
- Athletics conference: Western Slope
- Mascot: Skier
- Website: ahs.aspenk12.net

Aspen High School is a comprehensive public high school in Aspen, Colorado. It is the only high school in the Aspen School District.

The school district covers Aspen, Woody Creek, and much of Snowmass Village.

== Experimental Education (ExEd) ==
Official website

== Athletics ==
=== Teams ===
The Aspen High School teams are known as the Skiers. According to an online article by Mike Swanson, SBLive Sports, Sports Illustrated, "Aspen is the only resort town in the state — and the only high school in the country — to call its athletic teams the Skiers... the school holds a bunch of state championships in boys and girls skiing, but the Skiers have also won state titles in lacrosse, golf, swimming, cross country and ice hockey." The school's colors are black and red.

Aspen teams compete in the following sports:

- Football
- Cross country
- Boys golf
- Boys' soccer
- Boys' tennis
- Softball
- Volleyball
- Nordic skiing
- Alpine skiing
- Girls' basketball
- Boys' basketball
- Boys' Ice hockey
- Girls' swimming
- Baseball
- Boys' lacrosse
- Girls' lacrosse
- Girls' golf
- Girls' soccer
- Girls' tennis
- Track

=== State championships ===
- Boys' lacrosse

2015 4A State Champions

- Boys' skiing
  - 2000 Colorado High School Activities Association State Champions
  - 2002 CHSAA State Champions
  - 2005 CHSAA State Champions
  - 2007 CHSAA State Champions
  - 2009 CHSAA State Champions
  - 2012 CHSAA State Champions
  - 2014 CHSAA State Champions
  - 2018 CHSAA State Champions
  - 2019 CHSAA State Champions
  - 2020 CHSAA State Champions
- Girls' skiing
  - 2000 CHSAA State Champions
  - 2001 CHSAA State Champions
  - 2002 CHSAA State Champions
  - 2003 CHSAA State Champions
  - 2011 CHSAA State Champions
  - 2012 CHSAA State Champions
  - 2016 CHSAA State Champions
  - 2016 CHSAA State Champions
  - 2018 CHSAA State Champions
- Boys' golf
  - 2018 3A CHSAA State Champions
- Girls' swimming
  - 2017 3A CHSAA State Champions
- Boys' lacrosse
  - 2015 4A CHSAA State Champions
- Girls' cross country
  - 2002 3A CHSAA State Champions
- Boys' cross country
  - 1986 Division II CHSAA State Champions
- Ice hockey
  - 2007 CHSAA State Champions

== Demographics ==
Aspen High School enrolled 560 students during the 2023–24 school year. 464 were Caucasian, 72 were Hispanic, nine were Asian, and five were African American.
