= Clear Creek High School (Colorado) =

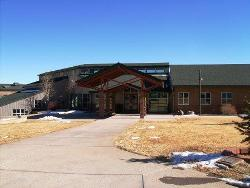
- Clear Creek High School, January 2009

Location
- 185 Beaver Brook Canyon Rd; Evergreen, Colorado 80439; United States
- Coordinates: 39°42′57″N 105°24′14″W

Information
- Type: Public high school
- Established: 2002 (separate from previous 7-12 school)
- School district: Clear Creek School District RE-1
- CEEB code: 060785
- Principal: In progress
- Staff: 15.15 (FTE)
- Grades: 9-12
- Student to teacher ratio: 12.48
- Colors: Blue and gold
- Athletics: 3A
- Mascot: Golddigger
- Website: cchs.ccsdre1.org

Clear Creek High School is a public secondary institution in the Clear Creek School District in Clear Creek County, Colorado, United States. It serves students in Idaho Springs, Georgetown, Silver Plume, Empire, Berthoud Falls, Dumont, Downieville, Lawson, and parts of Evergreen. The Colorado 2007-2008 School Accountability Report listed Clear Creek High School as 'high' for overall academic performance on state assessments.

== History ==
Prior to 2002, Clear Creek High School was located in Idaho Springs, in the building that housed both the high school and Clear Creek Middle School. After the construction of the new high school on the top of Floyd Hill near Evergreen, Colorado, the middle school and high school were separated. In January 2009, however, the Clear Creek County School Board decided to move the middle school back in with the high school due to financial concerns. The middle school merged with the high school into the new building in the fall of 2009.

== Faculty ==
Clear Creek High School employed 16 full-time and seven part-time teachers during the 2007–2008 academic year, who had an average of 12 years' teaching experience.

== Athletics ==
Clear Creek High School is a 2A/3A classified athletic school.

The Clear Creek football team competes in the A-8 Central (8 Man) league. As of 2021 the school has a new stadium located on campus.

The 2025 Clear Creek football team had their first undefeated regular season run in Clear Creek history. The team was coached by Nicholas Isaacson and they won their league continuing the streak set by the 2024 team. The last time Clear Creek was league champions before this was 69 years ago in 1955.

The Clear Creek girls' basketball team competed in the 2A State Championship game for the first time in school history in 2018. Coached by Marc Gorenstein, the team's record was 24–3 at the end of the 2018 season.

== Notable alumni ==
- Annelise Loevlie (graduated), CEO of Icelantic Skis
- Haleigh Washington (attended), Olympic gold medalist in volleyball.
