= Sierra High School =

Sierra High School may refer to:

- Sierra High School (Mammoth Lakes, California), Mammoth Lakes, California
- Sierra High School (Manteca, California), Manteca, California
- Sierra High School (San Bernardino, California), 570 East Ninth Street San Bernardino, California 92410
- Sierra High School (Tollhouse, California), Tollhouse, California (in the Sierra Unified School District, Fresno County)
- Sierra High School (Whittier, California), Whittier, California
- Sierra High School (Colorado), Colorado Springs, Colorado
- La Sierra High School, Riverside, California
- Sierra Vista High School (Spring Valley, Nevada), Spring Valley, Nevada
