= Annelise Loevlie =

American business executive

- Born: Idaho Springs, Colorado
- Education: University of Vermont
- Occupation: CEO
- Organisation: Icelantic Skis

Annelise Loevlie is an American business executive and skier who is currently the chief executive officer of Icelantic Skis, a Denver-based niche ski manufacturer.

== Early life and education ==
Loevlie grew up in Idaho Springs, Colorado. Her parents run a shotcrete business, a type of sprayable concrete. Loevlie attended to Clear Creek High School and would ski at nearby Loveland Ski Area. She graduated from University of Vermont in 2004 with degrees in international business and Spanish.

== Career ==
In 2006, Loevlie was managing multiple restaurants in the Colorado Front Range area when she joined Icelantic Skis, handling their marketing and sales. In 2014, she took over as CEO, helping to save the company from bankruptcy. She implemented changes including moving Icelantic's headquarters from Denver to Golden, Colorado, electing to fire friends and shutdown the company's European office to reduce overhead. Icelantic subsequently returned to profitability and expanded into multiple international markets.

Loevlie advocates for women in the ski industry, citing the small number of women in leadership positions. She has focused on women-specific skis and cites the overall progress that has been made in the quality of women's skis.

Loevlie sits on the board of SnowSports Industries America (SIA).

== Awards and honors ==
In 2014, Loevlie received the Presidential "E" Award for Export Excellence which recognizes people who contribute to the growth of American exports. Her mother received the same award in recognition of the exports of her shotcrete business.
