= CIVA Charter High School =

Public school in Colorado Springs, Colorado, U.S.

Location
- 4635 Northpark Drive; Colorado Springs, Colorado 80918; United States
- Coordinates: 38°53′56″N 104°49′34″W

Information
- School type: Public charter high school
- Motto: The art and soul of education
- Established: September 1997 (28 years ago)
- School district: Colorado Springs 11
- CEEB code: 060257
- NCES School ID: 080306001589
- Teaching staff: 17.23 (on an FTE basis)
- Grades: 9–12
- Enrollment: 181 (2023–2024)
- Student to teacher ratio: 10.50
- Colors: Black and teal
- Athletics conference: CHSAA
- Mascot: Raven
- Website: www.civacharterschool.org

CIVA Charter High School, whose acronym stands for Character, Integrity, Vision, and the Arts, is a public charter school in Colorado Springs, Colorado, United States. It is authorized by Colorado Springs District 11.
