= The Vanguard School (Colorado) =

Public charter school in Colorado Springs, Colorado, U.S.

Location
- 1605 South Corona Avenue; Colorado Springs, Colorado 80905; United States; 38°48′40″N 104°48′56″W

Information
- Former name: Cheyenne Mountain Charter Academy
- Type: Charter school
- Established: 1995; 31 years ago
- School district: Harrison 2
- CEEB code: 060249
- NCES School ID: 080453006370; 080453006402; 080453001326
- Executive Director: Jim Smith
- Teaching staff: 102.17 (on an FTE basis)
- Grades: K–12
- Enrollment: 1,495 (2024–25)
- Student to teacher ratio: 14.63
- Colors: Navy and old gold
- Athletics conference: CHSAA
- Mascot: Courser
- USNWR ranking: 154th
- Website: thevanguardschool.com

The Vanguard School is a public charter school in Colorado Springs, Colorado. It serves students in kindergarten through twelfth grade and is authorized by Harrison School District 2. In the 2024–25 academic year, the school enrolled 1,495 students.

== History ==
The Vanguard School was founded in the fall of 1995 as the Cheyenne Mountain Charter Academy. The school was originally created as a K–6 school chartered with Cheyenne Mountain School District 12. The high school program was approved in 2006, and the first seniors graduated in 2010. In 2021, the school's charter changed to Harrison School District 2.

== Controversy ==
=== Disability discrimination lawsuit ===
In 2014, the school denied an autistic six-year-old student re-enrollment because of its inability to hire staff to care for the student during the day. The mother of the student sued the school district in response, citing the Individuals with Disabilities in Education Act and claiming that not allowing her student re-enrollment would cause him "irreparable harm." The family was able to keep their son enrolled in the school, but they sued the school district again in 2019 because the school did not provide the student with appropriate accommodations. The family ultimately lost the case.

== Academics ==
=== Enrollment ===
Students at the Vanguard School are enrolled by a lottery system. Incoming students for the first through eleventh grades require a placement test. In the lottery, students are ranked by priority group, with the children of staff having the highest priority, followed by students in District 2, followed by other students. The school does not accept new twelfth grade students.

=== Curriculum ===
The Vanguard School follows the E. D. Hirsh Core Knowledge curriculum. The schools offers its students many Advanced Placement courses, and about four-fifths of high school students participate

== Extracurricular activities ==
=== Athletics ===
The Vanguard School competes at the 3A level in the Tri-Peaks League of the Colorado High School Activities Association. The school offers eleven sports for high school students, including volleyball, soccer, tennis, cross country, basketball, cheer-leading and track and field. The school also operates a boys' club volleyball team, created in 2013, eight years before CHSAA officially introduced the sport. This team has won the Colorado 3A championship for three years, from 2016 to 2018.

=== Team America Rocketry Challenge ===
The Vanguard School has participated in Team America Rocketry Challenge since 2002. The team made it to the national final competition several times in its history, in 2006, 2008, 2014, 2016, 2018, 2019, 2022, and 2024. Its best performance was its fifth-place in the 2008 contest.

== Campuses ==
The Vanguard School operates two campuses in the Stratton Meadows neighborhood near downtown Colorado Springs.

=== Wahsatch campus ===
The Wahsatch campus is located at 1832 South Wahsatch Avenue. It is the location of the building that serves grades K–3 and is the campus where the school originally operated at.

=== Corona campus ===
The Corona campus is located at 1605 South Corona Avenue. It is the campus where grades 4–12 are held. The campus has four buildings that are used for classes, as well as a separate building for a gymnasium, weight room and storage rooms. There is also a collection of buildings that consists of a weight room and some extra classrooms and storage rooms.

The school's campus is in the middle of a neighborhood known for crime. The Executive Director has raised concerns with City Council, and there are occasional incidents. In 2018, a woman was arrested for carrying knives and samurai swords onto the campus.

== Notable alumni ==
- Nique Clifford (class of 2020), NBA player with the Sacramento Kings
