= Charter School Institute =

Colorado Department of Education agency

Address
- 1525 Sherman Street Denver, Colorado, 80203; United States
- Coordinates: 39°44′26″N 104°59′6″W

District information
- Type: Charter school authorizer
- Grades: PK–12
- Established: 2004; 22 years ago
- Executive Director: Terry Croy Lewis
- School board: 9 members
- Chair of the board: Brenda Bautsch Dickhoner
- Director of education: Jessica Welch
- Governing agency: Colorado Department of Education
- Schools: 44
- Budget: $273,532,000
- NCES District ID: 0800020

Students and staff
- Students: 19,593
- Teachers: 1,163.39 (on an FTE basis)
- Staff: 2,347.01 (on an FTE basis)
- Student–teacher ratio: 16.84

Other information
- Website: www.csi.state.co.us

The Colorado Charter School Institute is an independent agency of the Colorado Department of Education and is the only independent, statewide charter school authorizer in the state of Colorado in the United States.

== History ==
The Legislature created the State Charter School Institute in 2004.

== Role ==
Like the already existing school district authorizers, CSI was created with the authority to approve or deny charter applications, set expectations and oversee performance for its own charter schools, and determine whether to renew or close a school based on its performance.

CSI is authorized to accept applications for schools (1) in districts without exclusive chartering authority (ECA) and (2) in districts which have retained ECA, with permission to the applicant from the district's board of education. CSI accepts applications from those interested in starting a new charter school as well as those interested in expanding or replicating an existing charter school or transferring from another district. Over 2/3 of charter schools authorized by CSI are located in districts that have retained exclusive chartering authority.

== Leadership ==
CSI is governed by a nine-member Board of Directors: seven members are appointed by the Governor and two by the Commissioner of Education.

== Charter school accountability ==
CSI uses guidance from the National Association of Charter School Authorizers (NACSA) for performance frameworks.

== Model authorizing practices ==
CSI is called out in statute to assist districts in implementing authorizing best practices.

== See also ==
- Colorado Department of Education
  - List of school districts in Colorado
  - List of charter schools in Colorado
