= James Irwin Charter Schools =

Location
- 5525 Astrozon Boulevard; Colorado Springs, Colorado 80916; United States
- 38°47′50″N 104°43′42″W

Information
- School type: Public charter school network
- Motto: Character Development & Academic Excellence
- Established: 2000; 26 years ago
- School district: Colorado Springs 11; El Paso County 49; Harrison 2
- CEEB code: 060319 (High); 069086 (Middle); 060270 (PTEC)
- NCES School ID: List: Astrozon: 080453001902; Howard: 080306006595; Canada Drive: 080387006889; Middle: 080453001964; High: 080453001781; PTEC: 080387006693
- Chief Executive Officer: Rob Daugherty
- Teaching staff: 141.52 (on an FTE basis)
- Grades: K–12
- Gender: Coeducational
- Enrollment: 2,131 (2024–25)
- Student to teacher ratio: 15.06
- Campuses: 4
- Colors: Navy, silver, and white
- Athletics conference: CHSAA
- Mascot: Jaguar
- Website: jamesirwin.org

James Irwin Charter Schools (JICS) is a charter school network in Colorado Springs, Colorado, serving student grades in kindergarten through twelfth grades. The school is named in honor of astronaut James Irwin, the eighth person to walk on the Moon. JICS features six schools, including three elementary schools, one middle school, one regular high school, and a vocational high school.

The Astrozon elementary school campus, middle school, and high school are authorized by Harrison School District 2. The Howard elementary school campus is authorized by Colorado Springs School District 11, and the Canada Drive elementary campus and Power Technical (PTEC), the vocational school, are authorized by School District 49.

== Enrollment ==
In the 2024–25 academic year, JICS enrolled 2,131 students across its six schools. Among the elementary schools, there were 522 students at the Astrozon elementary school campus, 213 at the Howard elementary school campus, and 132 at the Canada Drive campus. Among the secondary schools, the middle school had 434 students, the high school had 425, and Power Technical had 405.
