= Dan Audick =

American football player (born 1954)

No. 75, 60, 61
- Positions: Tackle, guard

Personal information
- Born: November 15, 1954 (age 71); San Bernardino, California, U.S.
- Listed height: 6 ft 3 in (1.91 m)
- Listed weight: 252 lb (114 kg)

Career information
- High school: Wasson (Colorado Springs, Colorado)
- College: Hawaii
- NFL draft: 1977: 4th round, 106th overall pick

Career history
- St. Louis Cardinals (1977); San Diego Chargers (1978–1980); San Francisco 49ers (1981–1982); St. Louis Cardinals (1983–1984)

Awards and highlights
- Super Bowl champion (XVI)

Career NFL statistics
- Games played: 76
- Games started: 32
- Fumble recoveries: 2
- Stats at Pro Football Reference

Daniel James Audick (born November 15, 1954) is an American former professional football player who was an offensive lineman in the National Football League (NFL) from 1977 through 1984. He played college football for the Hawaii Rainbow Warriors.

== Early life ==
A second generation Lithuanian American, Dan was born into a large military family as the son of Col. Albert E. Audick, Sr. and Stella (née Matulevich) Audick. After his birth, he and his nine siblings moved to military bases in France, Virginia, Tennessee, Japan, Colorado, and Los Angeles. As a high school senior at Wasson High School in Colorado Springs, Audick earned All-State honors as an offensive lineman while contributing to the winning of what was then the AAA-Colorado high school football championship in 1971. In 2005, Audick was inducted with his teammates and coaches into the Colorado Springs Sports Hall of Fame.

== College career ==
Audick was a scholarship student-athlete at the University of Hawaiʻi at Mānoa from 1972 to 1976 and a team captain in the 1976 football season. Under the pioneering leadership of coach Larry Price, he was one of the few former Warriors who made the transition from Division II Independent to Division IA Independent and who would go on to NFL careers and coaching careers.

== Professional career ==
Audick was selected 106th overall in the fourth round by the Pittsburgh Steelers in the 1977 NFL draft. He started in 33 of 76 regular season games while playing for the St. Louis Cardinals, San Diego Chargers, and San Francisco 49ers. In post-season play, Audick started in 5 of 6 playoff games. Under the leadership of Coach Don Coryell, Audick played on a Chargers' team that clinched two consecutive playoff berths (1979 and 1980). With the 1980 Chargers, Audick started at the right tackle position in the AFC Championship game versus the Oakland Raiders where he protected Dan Fouts' frontside in the "Air Coryell" offense.

In 1981, Audick was traded to the San Francisco 49ers. Though he was considered to be "undersized" for the left tackle position, he was tasked with the responsibility of protecting Joe Montana's "blindside." Under the guidance of Coach Bill Walsh, Audick was a key contributor on the final 89-yard drive that led to the play that has been immortalized as "The Catch" in the 1982 NFC Playoffs versus the Dallas Cowboys. Audick subsequently started in Super Bowl XVI wearing number 61 for the 49ers' 26–21 victory over the Cincinnati Bengals.

When Michael Lewis was researching for his 2006 book, The Blind Side: Evolution of a Game, he called upon several former NFL coaches and players who had played the left tackle position including Audick. Audick helped Lewis understand the role of the "undersized" versus the "prototypical." In Lewis's book, Audick is credited with having played a contributing role in the evolution of the "undersized" left tackle position. In 2009, the book was made into a movie called The Blind Side.

Audick was the first student athlete to graduate from the University of Hawaii and to contribute to a winning Super Bowl team.

Dan was the defensive line coach in 1991 for Grossmont College in El Cajon, California.

== Academic career ==
- Bachelor of Business Administration from University of Hawaii (1977)
- Master of Business Administration from San Diego State University (1986)
- Master of Arts in Organizational Management from University of Phoenix (1996)
- Doctor of Education from University of Southern California (2004)

In addition to his professional football career, Audick pursued three advanced degrees in the field of Sports Administration. Subsequent to his NFL retirement, he completed his MBA at San Diego State University in 1986. In honing his studies to Sports Administration, he crafted his coursework and thesis toward the design and development of a computerized feedback system for college and professional football teams. It was not until 2006 that SDSU formally graduated the official first class for a Sports MBA program . Audick was also an early participant in Internet education when he earned his second master's degree at the University of Phoenix's online program from 1994 to 1996. Audick completed his education by earning a doctorate in education in the field of Human Performance Technology at the University of Southern California. For his Ed.D dissertation, Audick used an instructional design enhancement to augment the instruction and communication of offensive passing routes and formations as compared with traditional approaches by using "eight points of a compass" coupled with measurable distances down field and a "grid and code" system, respectively.
