= Coronado High School (Colorado) =

Location
- 1590 West Fillmore Street; Colorado Springs, Colorado 80904; United States; 38°52′25″N 104°51′29″W

Information
- Other names: Coronado, CHS
- School type: Public high school
- School district: Colorado Springs 11
- CEEB code: 060273
- NCES School ID: 080306000228
- Principal: Adareine Arnell
- Teaching staff: 68.54 (on an FTE basis)
- Grades: 9–12
- Enrollment: 1,317 (2023-2024)
- Student to teacher ratio: 19.22
- Colors: Scarlet and gold
- Athletics conference: CHSAA
- Mascot: Cougar
- Feeder schools: Holmes Middle School; Jenkins Middle School; West Middle School
- Website: www.d11.org/coronado

Coronado High School (CHS) is a public high school in Colorado Springs, Colorado, United States. It is part of the Colorado Springs School District 11.

Coronado High School is located on Mesa Road and Fillmore Street, on a mesa overlooking Colorado Springs, with a view of Pikes Peak and Garden of the Gods.

The school's colors are scarlet red and new gold, and its mascot is the cougar.

== Athletics ==
Coronado has 19 sports programs, including 7 during the fall, 5 during the winter, and 7 during the spring. The school currently competes at the 5-A athletics level.

=== Fall ===
- Football
- Girls Volleyball
- Cross Country
- Boys Soccer
- Softball
- Boys Tennis
- Boys Golf

=== Winter ===
- Boys Basketball
- Girls Basketball
- Wrestling
- Ice Hockey
- Girls Swimming

=== Spring ===
- Baseball
- Boys Swimming
- Boys Volleyball
- Girls Golf
- Girls Tennis
- Track
- Girls Soccer
- Girls Football

== Extracurricular Organizations ==
=== Robotics ===
In 2008, Coronado's FIRST Robotics Competition Team 2996 "Cougars Gone Wired" was founded. Team 2996 has won a regional event on 3 occasions.

=== KUGR-TV ===
Coronado students enrolled in the KUGR-TV class produce a weekly television show for the student body, which is viewable on the school's YouTube channel.

=== Theater ===
Thespian Troupe 3397 has performed through the school's theater department since 2014.

== Notable alumni ==
The school mascot, the cougar

- Steven T. Seagle (1983), writer and producer of comic books, film and television
- Henry Cejudo (2005), UFC champion and Olympic gold medalist in wrestling
- Renée Good (2006), American killed by a United States Immigration and Customs Enforcement agent in Minneapolis, Minnesota on January 7, 2026.
- Trey Gregory-Alford (2024), Baseball Player in the Los Angeles Angels organization
- Brian Olson (1991)
