= Colorado Springs School of Technology =

Innovation high school in Colorado Springs, Colorado

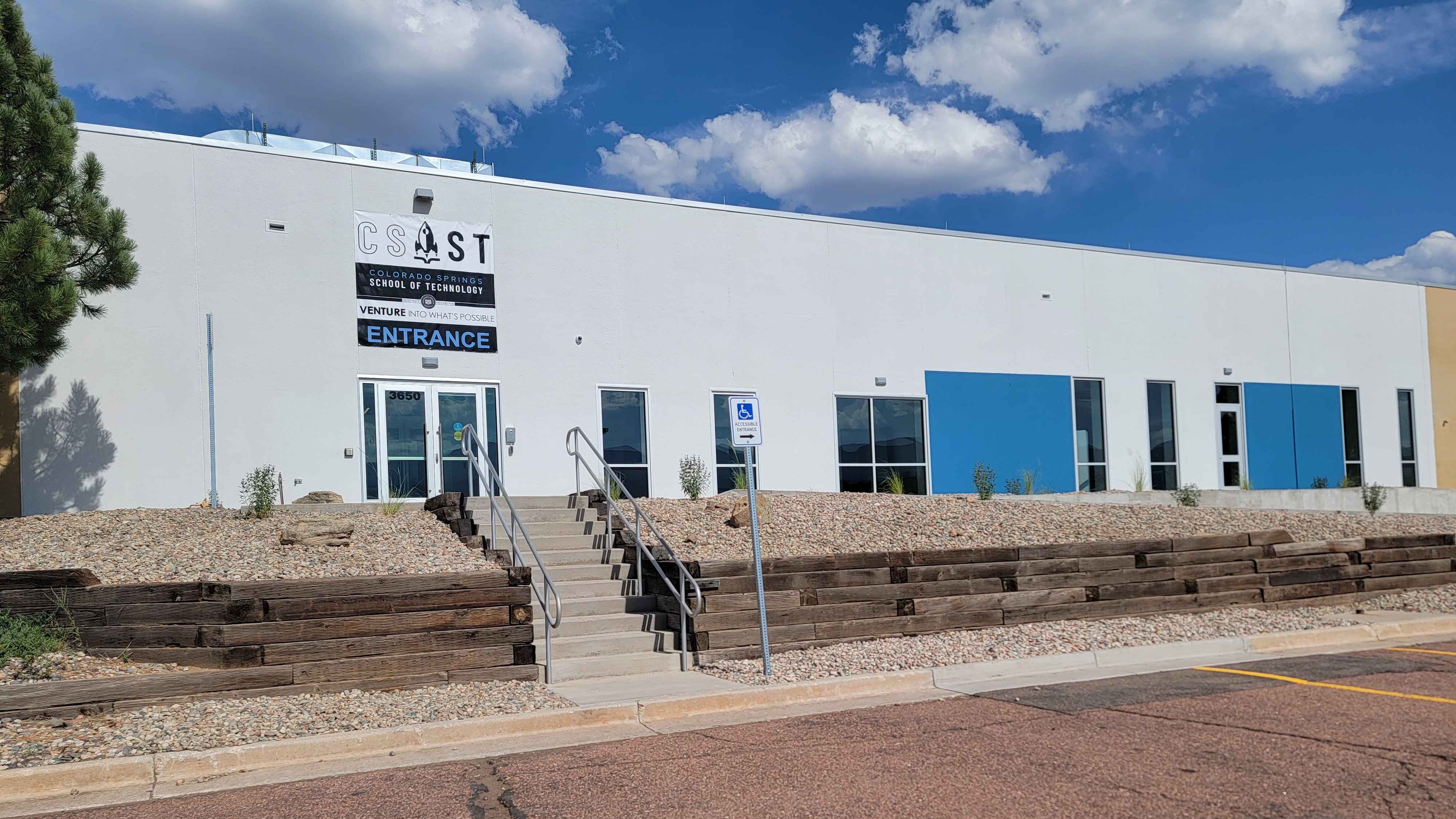

Location
- 3650 North Nevada Avenue; Colorado Springs, Colorado 80907; United States
- 38°53′1″N 104°49′15″W

Information
- School type: Innovation high school
- Motto: Venture into what's possible
- Established: August 12, 2025; 11 months ago
- School board: 9 members
- School district: Colorado Springs 11
- CEEB code: 002120
- NCES School ID: 080306006899
- President: Vance Brown
- Executive Director and Principal: Nathan Gorsch
- Grades: 9–10 (Note: The school will ultimately expand to serve students in grades 6–12.)
- Gender: Coeducational
- Mascot: Rocket
- Website: csrockets.org

The Colorado Springs School of Technology (CSST) is a STEM-focused innovation high school in Colorado Springs, Colorado. Operating autonomously as part of Colorado Springs School District 11, it opened in the 2025–26 academic year with approximately 100 students in the ninth and tenth grades with plans to expand in subsequent years.

Designed to prepare area students for future careers in aerospace and cybersecurity, CSST is a collaboration of many different educational, business, and government institutions, including the University of Colorado Colorado Springs, National Cybersecurity Center, United States Air Force Academy, and more.

== History ==
=== Conception ===
In 2023, the National Science Foundation (NSF) approved a $941,375 grant to a collaboration of local higher education, military, and private institutions, with the aim of developing the space and cybersecurity industries in Colorado Springs. The infrastructure for these industries was already largely in place when the grant was awarded, and the NSF emphasized the need to increase the size of the local workforce.

In collaboration with the grant recipients, Colorado Springs School District 11 applied for an innovation school focused on STEM education and cybersecurity in February 2024. Their application was approved by the Colorado Department of Education on April 11.

The school opened on August 12, 2025.

=== Campus ===
CSST is located in the Kevin W. O'Neil Cybersecurity Education and Research Center, which hosts the Space Information Sharing and Analysis Center, the headquarters of the National Cybersecurity Center, and cybersecurity classes at the University of Colorado Colorado Springs (UCCS). A $7 million project to convert this building into a usable space for UCCS was completed in 2022.

District 11 set aside $2.5 million to refurbish parts of the building for the school. UCCS, the owner of the building, is leasing 7,300 square feet (680 m^{2}) of space in the building to the school for free for thirty years, provided that the school district refurbishes the space themselves. The layout of the school is intended to more resemble an office than a traditional school. The renovation of the space took about three months.

== Academics ==
=== Enrollment ===
As an innovation school, CSST accepts students from across and beyond the district.

The school planned to begin the 2025–26 academic year with approximately 100 students in the ninth and tenth grades. Each year, the school will add a grade until reaching twelfth grade. There are also plans to add sixth through eighth grade classes to the school. CSST is expected to enroll 400–500 high school students by the end of its expansion period.

=== Curriculum ===
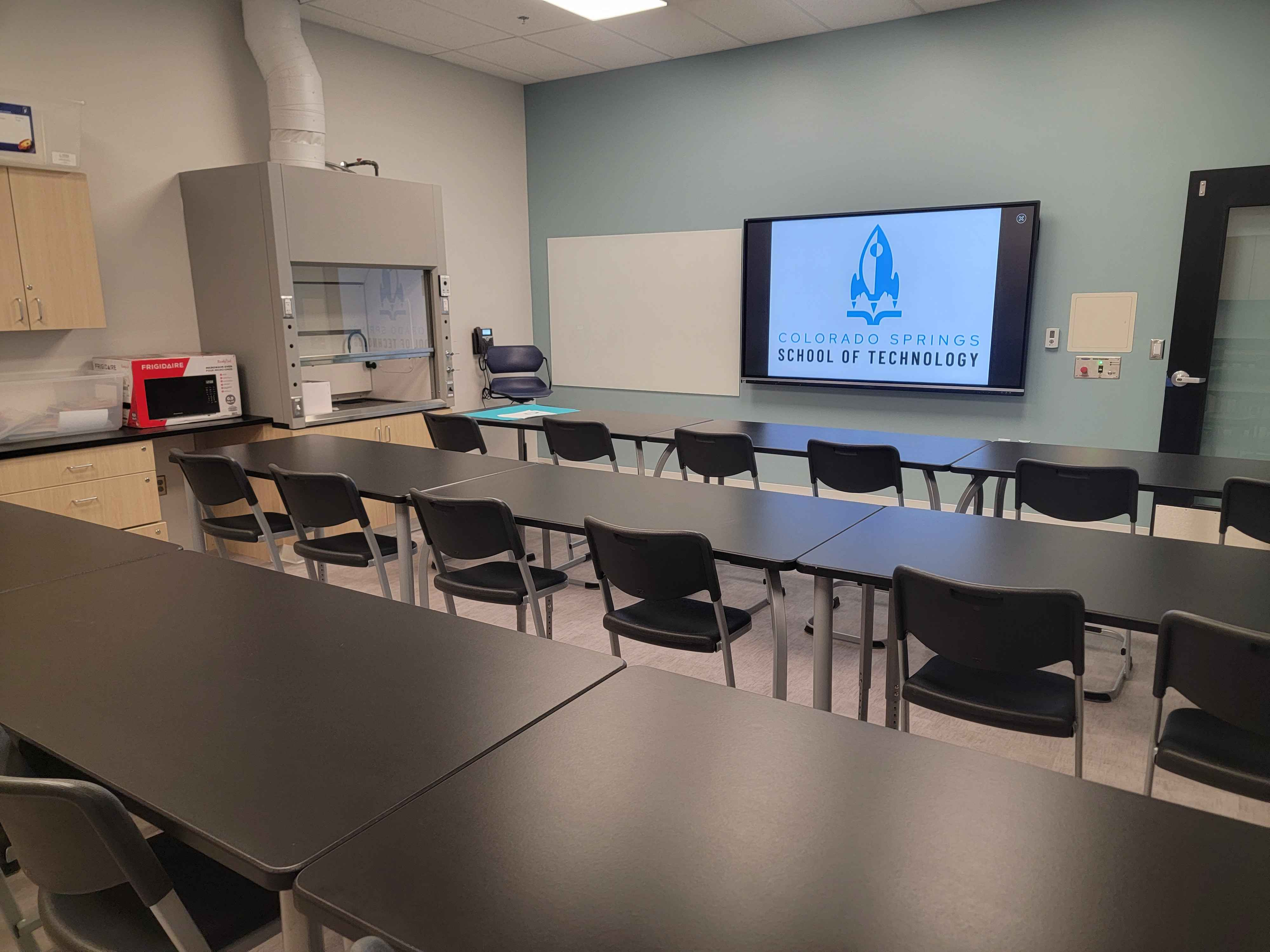
Science lab at CSST

The CSST curriculum focuses on preparing students for careers in cybersecurity, aerospace, and other high-tech fields. In addition to licensed teachers, the school invites industry professionals to teach classes at the school. Students have opportunities for dual enrollment at Pikes Peak State College and the University of Colorado Colorado Springs, participate in internships, and earn industry certifications. The school's inaugural principal, Nathan Gorsch, called the school a "professional playground" due to the opportunities students will have to interact with the high-tech industry.

The CSST curriculum is organized into four core pathways, allowing students to focus on aerospace, cybersecurity, entrepreneurship, or leadership. Courses offered at the school include AP Computer Science, courses covering artificial intelligence, engineering, and robotics, and classes taught in traditional high school curricula, such as history and ethics.

== Governance ==
CSST is an innovation school, a form of school that allows greater autonomy from the school district. This includes having its own board of directors and autonomy over its curriculum, scheduling, and budgeting. The law permitting innovation schools was passed in Colorado in 2008. The first and current principal is Nathan Gorsch, the former principal of Village High School in Academy District 20.

The school is governed by a Board of Directors made up of nine representatives from the school's stakeholders, which are Colorado Springs School District 11 and the members of the collaboration awarded the 2023 NSF grant, including the University of Colorado Colorado Springs, Pikes Peak State College, the National Cybersecurity Center, the Space Information Sharing and Analysis Center, the United States Air Force Academy, the Colorado Springs Chamber & EDC, and the Catalyst Campus for Technology and Innovation. The President of the Board of Directors is Vance Brown, the former CEO of the National Cybersecurity Center.
