= Mitchell High School (Colorado) =

Location
- 1205 Potter Drive; Colorado Springs, Colorado 80909; United States; 38°50′58″N 104°45′6″W

Information
- Other names: Mitchell High School
- School type: Public high school
- Motto: Taking Flight into the 21st Century
- Established: 1965; 61 years ago
- School district: Colorado Springs 11
- CEEB code: 060277
- NCES School ID: 080306000254
- Principal: George Smith
- Teaching staff: 47.29 (FTE)
- Grades: 9–12
- Enrollment: 784 (2023–24)
- Student to teacher ratio: 16.58
- Colors: Navy blue and orange
- Athletics conference: CHSAA
- Mascot: Marauder
- Website: mitchell.d11.org

Mitchell High School is the third-oldest high school in District 11 in Colorado Springs, Colorado, built in the 1960s.

Mitchell High School is the only school in the district to feature a planetarium.

The school's colors are burnt orange and navy blue, and the mascot is the Marauder.

The school's rival was Roy J. Wasson High School until the closure of that school.

== Course offerings ==
- Advanced Placement and Honors classes in all major content areas, CISCO and A+ certification programs
- Air Force Jr. ROTC
- Oceanology/Environmental Sciences
- Pro Start Culinary Arts
- Interior Design CAD
- Auto CAD
- Dance/Musical Theatre Programs
- Project Lead The Way Biomedical Sciences

== Notable alumni ==
- Cullen Bryant (Class of 1969), former NFL player (Los Angeles Rams, Seattle Seahawks)
- Alex Burtzos (Class of 2004), composer
- R.W. Eaks (Class of 1971), professional golfer
- Gene Krug, former MLB player (Chicago Cubs)
- Burnie Legette, former NFL player
- Terry Miller, former NFL player (Buffalo Bills, Seattle Seahawks)
- David Nevue, Pianist, composer, creator of Whisperings: Solo Piano Radio
- Darryl Pollard, former NFL player, x2 super bowl champion with the San Francisco 49ers
- Robin Rand (class of 1974), four-star general in the U.S. Air Force
- Bob Sapp, former football player and retired professional wrestler, actor, and comedian; competed as a professional MMA fighter
- Steve Scifres, former NFL player
