= Atlas Schools =

Location
- 1602 South Murray Boulevard; Colorado Springs, Colorado 80916; United States
- Coordinates: 38°48′43″N 104°45′3″W

Information
- Former name: Atlas Preparatory School
- School type: Charter school network
- Motto: Beyond a school
- Established: August 2009; 16 years ago
- School board: 6 members
- School district: Harrison 2
- CEEB code: 060336
- NCES School ID: 080453006810; 080453006691; 080453006425
- Principal: Various
- Teaching staff: 70.28 (on an FTE basis)
- Grades: K–12
- Gender: Coeducational
- Enrollment: 1,221 (2023–24)
- Student to teacher ratio: 17.37
- Campus type: City, Large
- Colors: Navy, black, and white
- Athletics conference: CHSAA
- Mascot: Gryphon
- Website: atlasschools.org

Atlas Schools is a public charter school network in Colorado Springs, Colorado. It is authorized by Harrison School District 2 and includes an elementary, middle, and high school. In the 2023–24 academic year, there were 1,221 students enrolled at its three schools.

== History ==
Atlas Schools was founded in 2009 as Atlas Preparatory School. The school originally opened with fifth grade classes. It had expanded to twelfth grade classes by 2016 and added an elementary school in 2020.

== Academics ==
=== Enrollment ===
In the 2023–24 academic year, there were 1,221 students enrolled in Atlas Schools, including 282 in the elementary school, 458 in the middle school, and 481 in the high school.

=== Recognition ===
Atlas was honored by the Colorado Department of Education as a "Center of Excellence" in 2010 and in 2018.

== Extracurricular activities ==
=== Athletics ===
Atlas High School competes in the Tri-Peaks League of the Colorado High School Activities Association. Their mascot is a gryphon, and their team colors are navy, black, and white.
