= Calhan School District RJ-1 =

School district in Colorado, United States

Address
- 800 Bulldog Drive Calhan, Colorado, 80808; United States
- Coordinates: 39°1′59″N 104°17′42″W

District information
- Type: Public school district
- Motto: Promoting High Standards and Social Responsibility
- Grades: Pre-K–12
- Superintendent: David Slothower
- Schools: 3
- NCES District ID: 0802730

Students and staff
- Students: 440 (2016–17)
- Teachers: 28 (2016–17)
- Student–teacher ratio: 15.66 (2016–17)
- Athletic conference: CHSAA
- District mascot: Bulldog
- Colors: Blue and red

Other information
- Website: www.calhanschool.org

The Calhan School District RJ-1 is a public school district serving northeastern El Paso County, Colorado as well as parts of southern Elbert County. Serving a relatively small population, the entire educational range of the district, from preschool through twelfth grade, is housed on a single campus, along with all of the administrative functions.

The school (and district) mascot is the bulldog.

== List of schools ==
The Calhan School District RJ-1 divides its grades into three schools, but they are all hosted on the same campus.

- Calhan Elementary School
- Calhan Middle School
- Calhan High School

== See also ==
- List of school districts in Colorado
