= 1994 All-Western Athletic Conference football team =

American football team

The 1994 All-Western Athletic Conference football team consisted of American football players selected by various organizations for All-Western Athletic Conference ("WAC") teams for the 1994 NCAA Division I-A football season.

== Offensive selections ==
=== Quarterbacks ===
- Stoney Case, New Mexico (Coaches-1)
- Anthoney Hill, Colorado State (Coaches-2)
- John Walsh, BYU (Coaches-2)

=== Running backs ===
- Ryan Christopherson, Wyoming (Coaches-1)
- Jamal Willis, BYU (Coaches-1)
- Wayne Pittman, San Diego State (Coaches-2)
- Toraino Singleton, UTEP (Coaches-2)
- Jerome Oliver, Fresno State (Coaches-2)

=== Wide receivers ===
- Marcus Harris, Wyoming (Coaches-1)
- Curtis Marsh, Utah (Coaches-1)
- Charlie Jones, Fresno State (Coaches-1)
- Curtis Shearer, San Diego State (Coaches-2)
- Deron Claiborne, Utah (Coaches-2)
- Jeremy Burkett, Colorado State (Coaches-2)

=== Tight ends ===
- David Sloan, Wyoming (Coaches-1)
- Chad Lewis, BYU (Coaches-2)

=== Offensive linemen ===
- Lance Scott, Utah (Coaches-1)
- Pat Meyer, Colorado State (Coaches-1)
- Anthony Brown, Utah (Coaches-1)
- Bret Cillessen, Air Force (Coaches-1)
- Evan Pilgrim, BYU (Coaches-1)
- Eli Herring, BYU (Coaches-2)
- Steve Scifres, Wyoming (Coaches-2)
- Brandon Turner, New Mexico (Coaches-2)
- Chris Finch, San Diego State (Coaches-2)
- Jason Jones, Fresno State (Coaches-2)

== Defensive selections ==
=== Defensive linemen ===
- Sean Moran, Colorado State (Coaches-1)
- Randy Brock, BYU (Coaches-1)
- Luther Elliss, Utah (Coaches-1)
- La'Roi Glover, San Diego State (Coaches-1)
- Steve Hodge, Colorado State (Coaches-2)
- Bronzell Miller, Utah (Coaches-2)
- Erik Davis, Air Force (Coaches-2)
- John Burrough, Wyoming (Coaches-2)

=== Linebackers ===
- Johnny Harrison, Air Force (Coaches-1)
- Kenya Ragsdale, Colorado State (Coaches-1)
- Mark Rexford, Utah (Coaches-1)
- Junior Faavae, Hawaii (Coaches-1)
- Ron Papazian, Fresno State (Coaches-2)
- Shay Muirbrook, BYU (Coaches-2)
- Steve Russ, Air Force (Coaches-2)
- Michael Comer, UTEP (Coaches-2)

=== Defensive backs ===
- Ricky Parker, San Diego State (Coaches-1)
- Andre Strode, Colorado State (Coaches-1)
- Kareem Leary, Utah (Coaches-1)
- Ernest Boyd, Utah (Coaches-1)
- Greg Myers, Colorado State (Coaches-1)
- Art Celestine, New Mexico (Coaches-2)
- Brian Watkins, Air Force (Coaches-2)
- Patrick Mitchell, BYU (Coaches-2)
- LeRon Hudgins, Air Force (Coaches-2)

== Special teams ==
=== Placekickers ===
- Marshall Young, UTEP (Coaches-1)
- Johann Lyssand, Fresno State (Coaches-2)

=== Punters ===
- Brian Gragert, Wyoming (Coaches-1)
- Alan Boardman, BYU (Coaches-2)

=== Return specialist ===
- David Dunn, Fresno State (Coaches-1)

== See also ==
- 1995 College Football All-America Team
