= Steve Scifres =

American football player (born 1972)

No. 72, 77, 68, 76, 52
- Position: Guard

Personal information
- Born: January 22, 1972 (age 54); Colorado Springs, Colorado, U.S.
- Listed height: 6 ft 4 in (1.93 m)
- Listed weight: 300 lb (136 kg)

Career information
- High school: Mitchell (Colorado Springs)
- College: Wyoming
- NFL draft: 1997: 3rd round, 83rd overall pick

Career history
- Dallas Cowboys (1997); Carolina Panthers (1998); Miami Dolphins (1998); New Orleans Saints (1999); → Frankfurt Galaxy (1999); St. Louis Rams (2000)*; → Scottish Claymores (2000); Dallas Cowboys (2000)*; San Francisco Demons (2001); Arizona Rattlers (2001); Indiana Firebirds (2002); Buffalo Destroyers (2003); Las Vegas Gladiators (2004); New York Dragons (2005–2006)
- * Offseason or practice squad member only

Awards and highlights
- First-team All-American (1996); 2× All-WAC (1995, 1996); Second-team All-WAC (1994); WAC "Freshman of the Year" (1993)

Career NFL statistics
- Games played: 7
- Stats at Pro Football Reference

Career AFL statistics
- Tackles: 9
- Passes defended: 1
- Fumble recoveries: 1
- Stats at ArenaFan.com

Steven William Scifres (born January 22, 1972) is an American former professional football player who was an offensive lineman in the National Football League (NFL) for the Dallas Cowboys, Carolina Panthers, Miami Dolphins and New Orleans Saints. He played college football at the University of Wyoming.

== Early life ==
Scifres attended Mitchell High School and the Air Force Academy Prep School. In 1989, he was named the area's "Player of the Year" as a two-way tackle. He also practiced wrestling.

From 1990 to 1991, he studied at the United States Air Force Academy Preparatory School. He accepted a football scholarship from the University of Wyoming, where he became one of the greatest offensive linemen in school history. Playing in high scoring passing offenses, he only allowed four sacks (2 as a freshman) during his college career.

As a redshirt freshman, he started 12 games at left guard on a team that had an 8-4 record and won the WAC title, while receiving "Freshman of the Year" honors. The next year he was switched to right tackle, where he would remain in the following years.

He started every game of his college career (47), was voted two times to the first team All-WAC team, was a semifinalist for the Outland Trophy and a second-team All-American in 1996. He was inducted into the Wyoming Athletics Hall of Fame in 2008.

== Professional career ==
=== Dallas Cowboys (first stint) ===
Scifres was selected in the third round (83rd overall) of the 1997 NFL draft by the Dallas Cowboys. At 25 years old, he was expected to be more polished than most rookies, but he struggled in pass protection. His progress was also slowed in training camp, by the fact that he was being used at all three offensive line positions. He was released on September 1, 1998.

=== Carolina Panthers ===
On October, 2, 1998, he signed with the Carolina Panthers. On November 5, he was waived to make room for linebacker Ernest Jones.

=== Miami Dolphins ===
On November, 25, 1998, he signed with the Miami Dolphins. He was released on December 15.

=== New Orleans Saints ===
On February 24, 1999, he signed with the New Orleans Saints, and was assigned to the Frankfurt Galaxy of the NFL Europe, where as a starter he was part of the league's championship team. He was cut by the Saints on September 5. He was added to the practice squad on November 11. He was released on November 23.

=== St. Louis Rams ===
On April 18, 2000, he was signed as a free agent by the St. Louis Rams. He was assigned to the Scottish Claymores of the NFL Europe, as an injury replacement with five games remaining in the season. He became a starter and helped the team reach the 2000 World Bowl. He was released by the Rams on May 4.

=== Dallas Cowboys (second stint) ===
On August 1, 2000, he signed with the Dallas Cowboys, but was released before the season started on August 21.

=== San Francisco Demons ===
In 2001, he signed with the San Francisco Demons of the XFL. He was a starter until the league folded at the end of its debut season.

=== Arena Football League ===
From 2001 to 2005, he played for five different AFL teams, that included the Arizona Rattlers, Indiana Firebirds, Buffalo Destroyers, Las Vegas Gladiators and New York Dragons.
