= Clear Creek School District RE-1 =

School district in Colorado, United States

Address
- 320 Highway 103/P.O. Box 3399 Idaho Springs, Colorado, 80452; United States
- Coordinates: 39°44′20.6″N 105°31′24.0″W

District information
- Superintendent: Wesley Paxton
- NCES District ID: 0803000

Students and staff
- Enrollment: 682 (2020-2021)
- Student–teacher ratio: 12.68

Other information
- Website: www.ccsdre1.org

Clear Creek School District RE-1 is the school district serving students of Clear Creek County, Colorado.

== Board of education ==
- President: Sandi Schuessler
- Vice President: Kelly Flenniken
- Secretary: Larry Pyers
- Member: Erica Haag
- Member: Jessica North

== List of schools ==
=== Elementary ===
- Carlson Elementary School
- King-Murphy Elementary School

=== Middle ===
- Clear Creek Middle School

=== High ===
- Clear Creek High School

=== Charter ===
- Georgetown Community School

== See also ==
- List of school districts in Colorado
