= Sierra High School (Colorado) =

Location
- 2250 Jet Wing Drive; Colorado Springs, Colorado 80916; United States; 38°48′6″N 104°45′9″W

Information
- School type: Public high school
- Established: 1984 (42 years ago)
- School district: Harrison 2
- CEEB code: 060293
- NCES School ID: 080453001382
- Principal: Connor Beaudoin
- Teaching staff: 48.00 (on an FTE basis)
- Grades: 9–12
- Enrollment: 822 (2023–2024)
- Student to teacher ratio: 17.12
- Colors: Cardinal and gold
- Athletics conference: CHSAA
- Mascot: Stallion
- Website: shs.hsd2.org

Sierra High School was the second high school to be built in Colorado Springs' School District 2. It is the most populated high school in its district.

The school's mascot is a Stallion, and the school colors are cardinal and gold.

Colorado Springs offers concurrent enrollment courses with Pikes Peak State College, open Advanced Placement classes, and Colorado State University is partnered with the school, in which Sierra graduates receive a $20,000 scholarship to attend CSU-Fort Collins.
