= Wasson High School =

Roy J. Wasson High School

Location
- 2115 Afton Way, Colorado Springs, Colorado; 38.861°N 104.782°W

Information
- Established: 1959
- Closed: 2013
- School district: Colorado Springs School District 11
- Colors: cardinal and gray
- Website: wassonhighschoolalumni.com

Roy J. Wasson High School was the second-oldest high school in District 11 in Colorado Springs, Colorado, United States. When the high school closed at the end of the 2012-2013 school year, it became the 12th school in the district to close since 2009 due to declining enrollment. The campus was converted into a center for alternative and adult education programs called the Roy J. Wasson Academic Campus.

== History ==
Roy J. Wasson High School was established in 1959 and named after the superintendent of Colorado Springs School District 11. The school's 28.2 acre (11.4 hectare) campus opened with a three-wing building built at a cost of $3.1 million with a capacity of nearly 2,000 students. A comprehensive high school which had been recognized at the state and national level as a school on the forefront of educational reform and innovation, Wasson was the only high school in District 11 with a dance studio.

Roy J. Wasson High School was the only high school in District 11 to be combined with another High School, Mitchell High. Due to cuts in staff from each school, both campuses combined selected classes. Students in the 9th and 10th grades attended classes on a seven period schedule. Upperclassmen may have had a combination of blocked (95 minute classes) and unblocked (50 minute classes). This flexibility in scheduling allowed for students to earn more credits than most high schools on a traditional schedule.

Following years of declining enrollment, the high school was recommended for closure in 2009. After avoiding being among the eight District 11 schools that closed that year, the school administration was directed to develop a plan to remake the school. The proposed plan included enhancing the school's existing freshman academy, creating upper-level academies that focused on the arts, law and leadership, and science and math, and adopting performance-based compensation for teachers.

The school was recommended for closure again in December 2012, by which time the school was operating at 50% of its building capacity. The school board voted in February 2013 to close the school at the end of the 2012-2013 school year. 645 students were displaced by the closure. The Navy JROTC program moved to Doherty High School.

The Roy J. Wasson Academic Campus opened in fall 2013, housing district programs and two freestanding alternative schools, The Bijou School and the Nikola Tesla Exceptional Opportunity School. By 2019, the campus was operating at 160% capacity as it offered four high school diploma programs and six programs encompassing adult and family education, digital school, night school, literacy and early childhood development.

Garry Berry Stadium is still currently used for the high schools in District 11.

== Extracurricular activities ==
=== Athletics ===
As the second high school to open in the district, the Thunderbirds' original rivalry was with Palmer High School. A rivalry with Mitchell High School began after it opened in 1965. The annual Helmet Game between Wasson and Mitchell is the longest high school football rivalry in Colorado Springs, ending at 48 years with Wasson's closing.

State championships:

- Boys' Basketball: 1978 (AAA)
- Boys' Cross Country: 1995 (5A)
- Football: 1971 (AAA)
- Boys' Gymnastics: 1975, 1983, 1988, 1989
- Girls' Gymnastics: 1983 (AAA)
- Boys' Track and Field: 1998 (5A)
- Boys' Wrestling: 1974 (AAA)

== Notable alumni ==
- Robb Akey, (1984) former University of Idaho head football coach, now defensive coordinator at Central Michigan University
- Roc Alexander, (2000) Colorado 200-meter record holder; former Denver Bronco and Houston Texan
- Dan Audick, (1972) former NFL lineman, San Francisco 49ers
- Rich "Goose" Gossage, (1970) member Baseball Hall of Fame as a pitcher, New York Yankees
- Scott Johnson, (1979) former gymnast, 1984 Olympic gold medalist
