= Arkansas Valley League =

The Arkansas Valley League is a high school athletic conference for several rural high schools along the Arkansas River Valley in southeastern Colorado.

== Member schools ==
At the time of writing (8 February 2024) the eight schools in the League were:

- Branson School, Branson
- Campo Undivided High School, Campo
- Kim Undivided High School, Kim
- Pritchett High School, Pritchett
- Springfield Junior / Senior High School, Springfield
- Vilas High School, Vilas
- Walsh High School, Walsh
- Wiley Junior / Senior High School, Wiley

Some of the schools enter combined teams. For example:

- Branson School and Kim Undivided High School enter a joint team called Branson / Kim. See Branson School website Athletics page
- South Baca Patriots represent Campo, Vilas and Pritchett in Volleyball, Basketball and Track. See Campo School Website Athletics page

Earlier, the league includes these schools:

- Holly Junior-Senior High School
- Cheyenne Wells High School
- Granada Undivided High School
- Walsh High School
- Springfield High School
- Wiley High School
- McClave School District
- Eads High School
