= Harrison School District 2 =

School district in Colorado, United States

Address
- 1060 Harrison Road Colorado Springs, Colorado, 80906; United States
- Coordinates: 38°47′52″N 104°48′38″W

District information
- Motto: Character Through Diversity, Challenge & Accomplishment
- Established: August 20, 1874; 150 years ago
- Superintendent: Wendy Birhanzel
- NCES District ID: 0804530

Students and staff
- Enrollment: 11,177 (2020-2021)
- Staff: 739.34 (on an FTE basis)
- Student–teacher ratio: 15.12

Other information
- Website: www.hsd2.org

Harrison School District 2 is the southern school district of Colorado Springs, Colorado, United States.

As of 2013 it had about 11,000 students.

The district includes sections of Colorado Springs, as well a most of the Stratmoor census-designated place, and a small portion of the Fort Carson CDP. A very small portion of Fountain municipality is in the district boundaries.

== List of schools ==
=== Elementary ===
- Bricker Elementary School
- Centennial Elementary School
- Giberson Elementary School
- Monterey Elementary School
- Mountain Vista Community School (K-8)
- Oak Creek Elementary School
- Otero Elementary School
- Pikes Peak Elementary School
- Sand Creek International School
- Soaring Eagles Elementary School
- Stratmoor Hills Elementary School
- Stratton Meadows Elementary School
- Turman Elementary School
- Wildflower Elementary School

=== Middle ===
- Carmel Middle School
- Fox Meadow Middle School
- Mountain Vista Community School (K-8)
- Panorama Middle School

=== High ===
- Harrison High School
- Sierra High School

=== Charter ===
- Atlas Preparatory School
- James Irwin Charter Schools
  - James Irwin Elementary School
  - James Irwin Middle School
  - James Irwin Charter High School
- The Vanguard School

== See also ==
- List of school districts in Colorado
