= Colorado Springs School District 11 =

School district located in El Paso County, Colorado U.S.

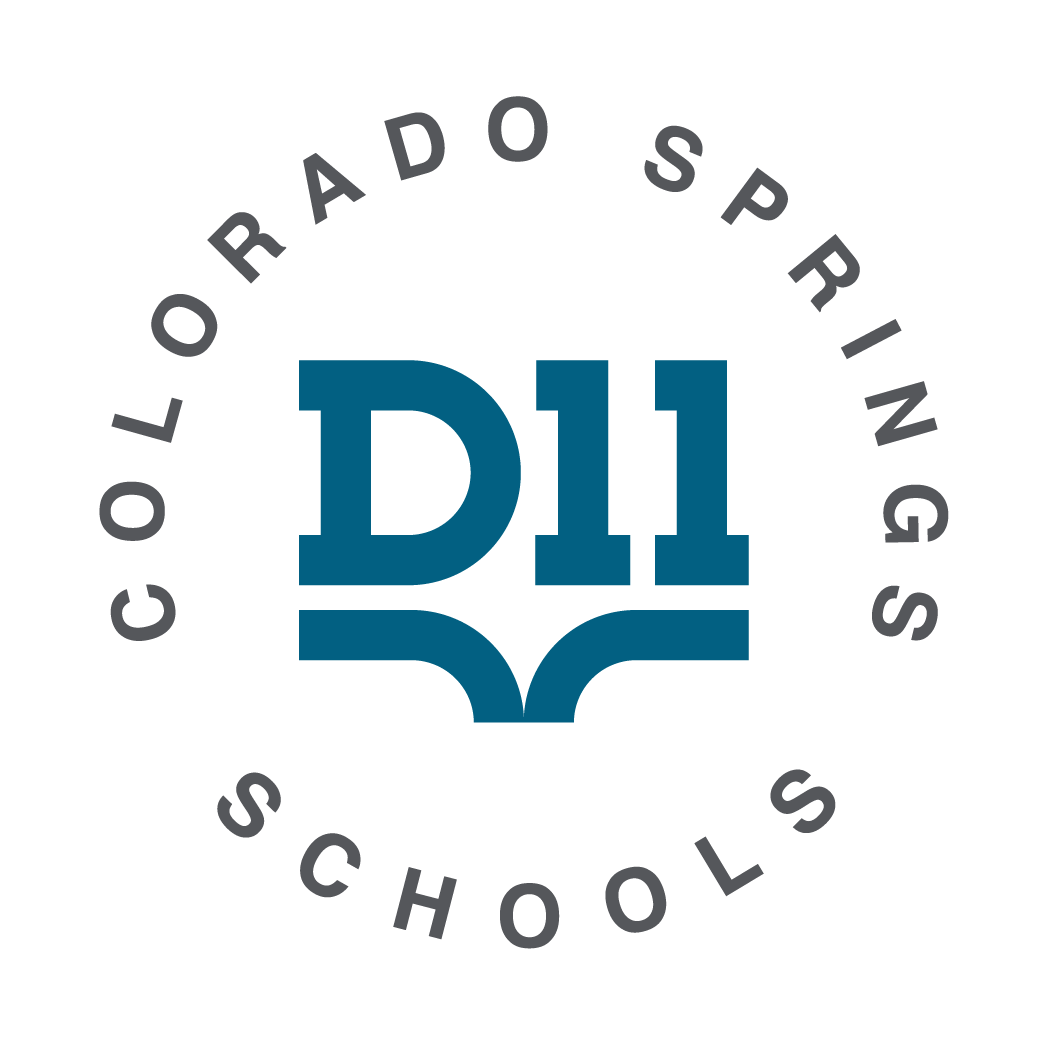

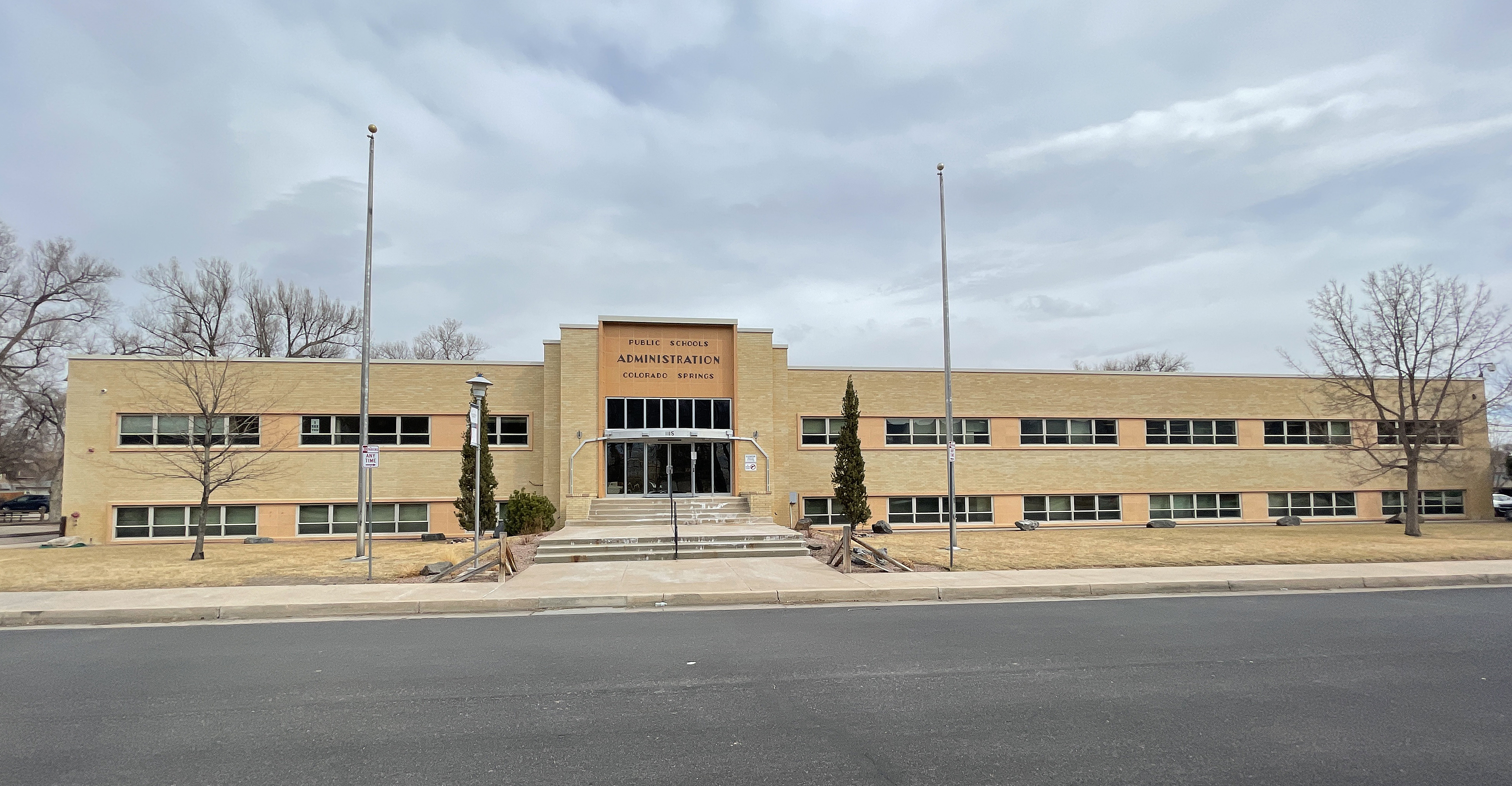
- The district's administration building

Address
- 1115 North El Paso Street Colorado Springs, Colorado, 80903; United States
- Coordinates: 38°50′58″N 104°48′44″W

District information
- Motto: Inspire every mind.
- Established: August 1872 (153 years ago)
- Superintendent: Michael Gaal

Other information
- Website: www.d11.org

The Colorado Springs School District 11 (D11) is the central school district located in Colorado Springs, Colorado. The administrative offices are located in El Paso County, Colorado. In the 2024–2025 school year, District 11 had 22,265 students. As of 2025, Michael Gaal is Superintendent of Schools.

The school district has a total of 58 schools during the 2024–2025 school year. The district has 34 elementary schools (including a designated Pre-K), eight intermediate schools, and four high schools. The district also includes small southern portions of the Cimarron Hills census-designated place.

== History ==
The first school in Colorado Springs was organized by Mary Mellen "Queen" Palmer, wife of city founder William Jackson Palmer, in late 1871. Classes were first held in a home on the northeast corner of Cascade Avenue and Bijou Street, rented by Mrs. Palmer for the school. School District 11 was established in August 1872. The district enrollment passed 1,000 by 1883 and stood at 1,776 on opening day of the Colorado Springs High School building in 1893. (That building was razed in 1938 to make way for construction of what is now Palmer High School.)

In 1919, the school districts of Colorado City (annexed by Colorado Springs in 1917) and Colorado Springs were consolidated. The district saw modest growth between 1920 and 1940, then a large boom following World War II.

== Schools ==
=== Current campuses ===
==== High schools ====
- Coronado High School
- Doherty High School
- Mitchell High School
- Palmer High School

==== Elementary schools ====
- Adams Elementary School
- Audubon Elementary School
- Bristol Elementary School
- Buena Vista Montessori
- Carver Elementary School
- Chipeta Elementary School
- Columbia Elementary School
- Edison Elementary School
- Freedom Elementary School
- Fremont Elementary School
- Grant Elementary School
- Henry Elementary School
- Howbert Elementary School
- Jackson Elementary School
- Keller Elementary School
- King Elementary School
- Madison Elementary School
- Martinez Elementary School
- McAuliffe Elementary School
- Midland Elementary School
- Monroe Elementary School
- Penrose Elementary School
- Queen Palmer Elementary School
- Rogers Elementary School
- Rudy Elementary School
- Scott Elementary School
- Steele Elementary School
- Stratton Elementary School
- Taylor Elementary School
- Trailblazer Elementary School
- Twain Elementary School
- West Elementary School
- Wilson Elementary School

==== Intermediate schools ====
- Galileo School of Math and Science (converted from the former East Middle School)
- Holmes Middle School
- Jenkins Middle School
- Mann Middle School
- North Middle School
- Russell Middle School
- Sabin Middle School
- Swigert Aerospace Academy (formerly Emerson-Edison Charter Academy)
- West Middle School

==== Charter schools ====
- Academy for Advanced and Creative Learning (Academy ACL)
- CIVA Charter High School
- Colorado Springs School of Technology
- Community Prep
- Eastlake High School
- GLOBE Charter School
- James Irwin Elementary School - Howard
- Roosevelt Charter Academy
- Colorado Early Colleges Colorado Springs

==== Alternative schools ====
- Achieve Online School
- Adult and Family Education
- Bijou School
- Career Pathways
- Digital High School
- Odyssey Early College and Career Options
- Roy J. Wasson Academic Center (formerly Wasson High School)
- Tesla Educational Opportunity School

=== Former campuses ===
- Bates Elementary School
- Franklin Elementary School
- Garfield Elementary School
- Hunt Elementary School
- Irving Middle School
- Ivywild Elementary School
- Jefferson Elementary School
- Lincoln Elementary School
- Longfellow Elementary School
- Lowell Elementary School
- Pike Elementary School
- Wasson High School
- South Middle School (demolished)
- Washington Elementary School
- Whittier Elementary School

== Board of Education members ==
As presented on the District 11 website

- President – Dr. Thomas Carey
- Vice president – Jill Haffley
- Secretary – Dr. Michelle Ruehl
- Treasurer – Jason Jorgenson
- Director – LeeAnn Baca Barlett
- Director – Charles Johnson
- Director – Dr. Parth Melpakam

== See also ==
- List of school districts in Colorado
