= Berthoud Falls, Colorado =

Unincorporated community in Clear Creek County, Colorado, United States

- unincorporated community
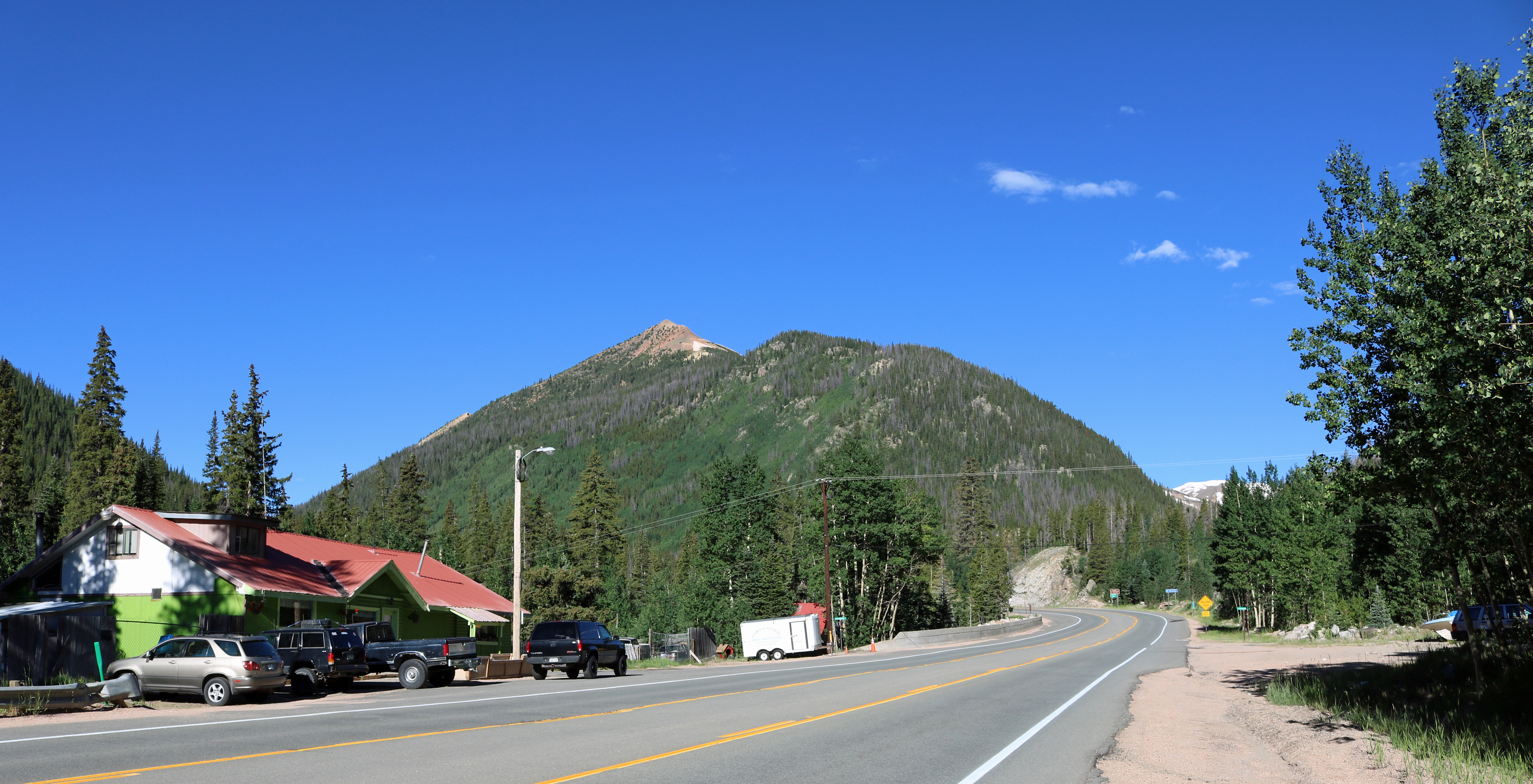
- Berthoud Falls with Red Mountain in the distance.

- Location of Berthoud Falls, Colorado. Berthoud Falls (Colorado)
- Coordinates: 39°46′15″N 105°48′31″W
- Country: United States
- State: Colorado
- County: Clear Creek

Government
  - Type: unincorporated community
  - Body: Clear Creek County
- Elevation: 9,794 ft (2,985 m)
- Time zone: UTC−07:00 (MST)
  - Summer (DST): UTC−06:00 (MDT)
- GNIS town ID: 197798

Berthoud Falls is an unincorporated community in Clear Creek County, Colorado, United States. The community is located south of Berthoud Pass on U.S. highway route 40 at an elevation of 9,794 feet (2,985 m). Berthoud Falls has never had a post office.

== See also ==
- Denver–Aurora–Lakewood, CO Metropolitan Statistical Area
- Front Range Urban Corridor
