= Woody Creek, Colorado =

Unincorporated community in Colorado, US

- Census-designated place
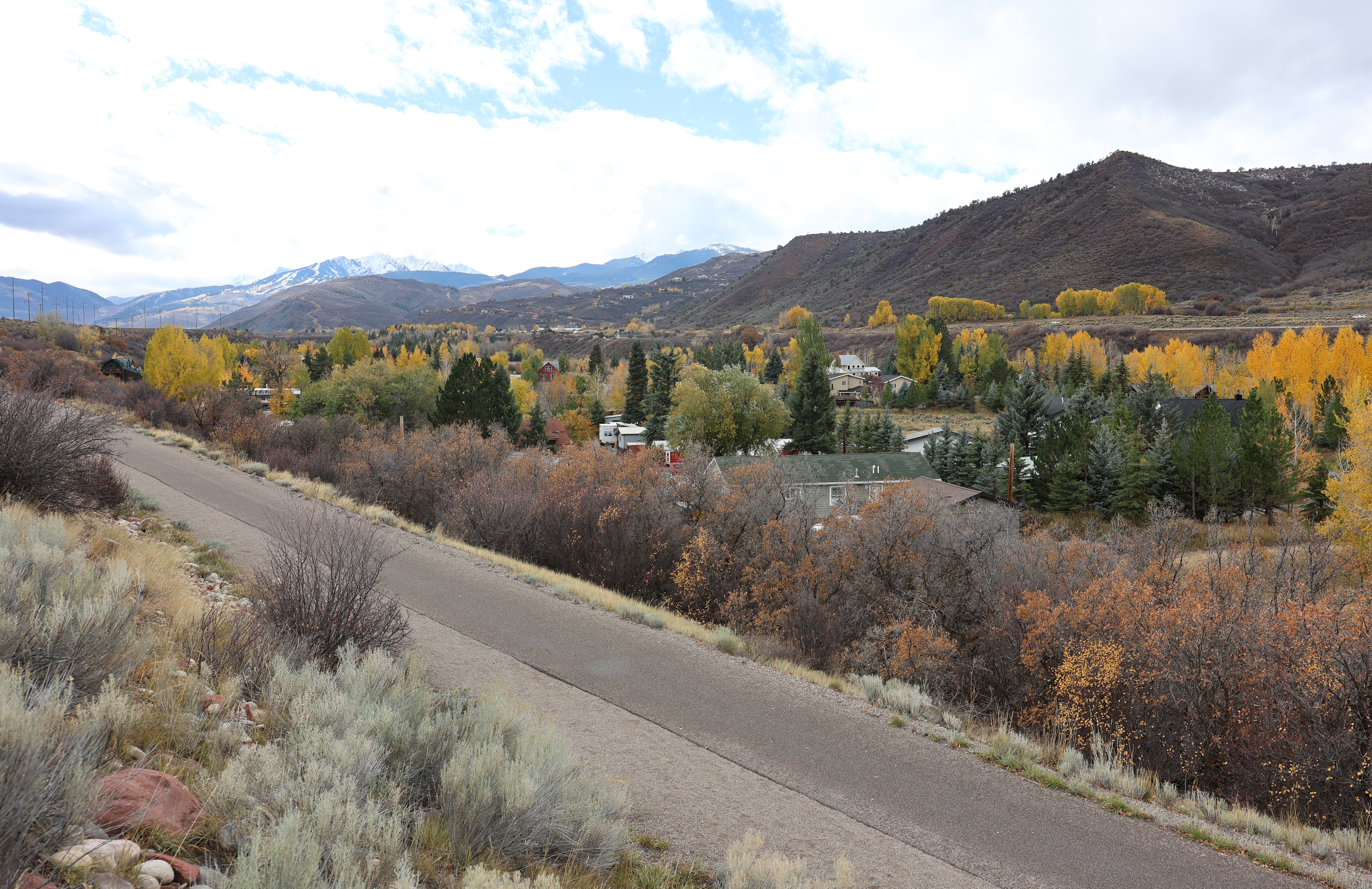
- Overlooking Woody Creek and the Rio Grande Trail, 2025

- Location of the Woody Creek CDP in Pitkin County, Colorado.
- Coordinates: 39°16′15″N 106°53′18″W
- Country: United States
- State: Colorado
- County: Pitkin

Government
  - Type: Unincorporated town

Area
  - Total: 0.613 sq mi (1.587 km^{2})
  - Land: 0.613 sq mi (1.587 km^{2})
  - Water: 0 sq mi (0.000 km^{2})
- Elevation: 7,290 ft (2,220 m)

Population (2020)
  - Total: 290
  - Density: 470/sq mi (180/km^{2})
- Time zone: UTC-7 (MST)
  - Summer (DST): UTC-6 (MDT)
- ZIP Code: 81656
- Area code: 970
- GNIS feature ID: 2583319

Woody Creek is an unincorporated town, a post office, and a census-designated place (CDP) located in and governed by Pitkin County, Colorado, United States. The Woody Creek post office has the ZIP Code 81656 (post office boxes). At the United States Census 2020, the population of the Woody Creek CDP was 290. The Woody Creek Metropolitan District provides services. The CDP is a part of the Glenwood Springs, CO Micropolitan Statistical Area.

== Geography ==
Woody Creek is situated in the valley of the Roaring Fork River northwest of Aspen, along State Highway 82, where Woody Creek exits a canyon and joins the Roaring Fork. It is situated at the northwest (and least developed) end of a small valley that stretches southeast along the Roaring Fork to Aspen.

The Woody Creek CDP has an area of 392 acres (1.587 km^{2}), all land.

== Demographics ==
Woody Creek CDP, Colorado
Year	Pop.	±%
2010	263	—
2020	290	+10.3%
Source: United States Census Bureau

== Location and culture ==
The community is centered on a log cabin built in the 1940s by the Lee Jones family, which now houses the Woody Creek Tavern as well as the Woody Creek Community Center. The cabin sits along a county road adjacent to a trailer park and several homes.

Woody Creek was the residence of noted author Hunter S. Thompson for much of his life and at the time of his death. It also has been the home of several other celebrities and musicians including the late broadcaster Ed Bradley, Don Henley of the Eagles, John Oates (Hall and Oates), Jimmy Ibbotson of The Nitty Gritty Dirt Band and actor Don Johnson. Currently, former Speaker of the U.S. House of Representatives Nancy Pelosi has a winter home in Woody Creek.

Woody Creek was the residence of many of the founding members of the Aspen Ridiculous Theatre Company (ART-C). ART-C is notable for its annual Winterskol show and spring extravaganzas at the Wheeler Opera House.

== Education ==
It is in Aspen School District 1. The district's comprehensive high school is Aspen High School.

== See also ==
- Glenwood Springs, CO Micropolitan Statistical Area
