= Roc Alexander =

American football player (born 1981)

No. 45, 22
- Position: Safety

Personal information
- Born: September 23, 1981 (age 45); Colorado Springs, Colorado, U.S.
- Listed height: 5 ft 10 in (1.78 m)
- Listed weight: 190 lb (86 kg)

Career information
- High school: Wasson (Colorado Springs)
- College: Washington
- NFL draft: 2004: undrafted

Career history
- Denver Broncos (2004–2005); Houston Texans (2006–2007)

Career NFL statistics
- Total tackles: 25
- Fumble recoveries: 2
- Return yards: 665
- Stats at Pro Football Reference

Narond Adrian "Roc" Alexander (born September 23, 1981) is an American former professional football player who was a safety in the National Football League (NFL). He played college football for the Washington Huskies before being signed by the Denver Broncos as an undrafted free agent in 2004.

== Early life ==
Playing running back on offense and cornerback on defense, Roc Alexander helped lead Roy J. Wasson High School of Colorado Springs to a 7-4 finish and the Metro North championship as a senior. He rushed for 1,620 yards on 162 carries (10.0 avg.) with 18 touchdowns while catching 11 passes for 274 yards (24.9 avg.). Defensively, he recorded 110 tackles and returned two interceptions for scores. In 1999, Alexander was a Denver Post "Blue Chip" selection, named to the Colorado Springs Gazette-Telegraph 's All-Area team, selected to the Rocky Mountain News ' all-state squad and was an honorable mention pick on USA Today 's All-USA team. Alexander was Colorado's state champion in the 100 meter dash (10.5 seconds) at Wasson.

== College career ==
Alexander started 14-of-35 career games at the University of Washington, recording 86 tackles (58 solo), four interceptions, 18 passes defensed and three forced fumbles. He also added 34 kick returns for 868 yards (25.5 avg.) and a touchdown. The 25.5-yard career kick-return average ranked third all-time in UW annals, and his kick-return career yardage total ranked fourth in school annals. As a senior, he led the Huskies in kickoff returns with 268 yards on 13 returns (20.6 avg.) while contributing 25 tackles and a forced fumble on defense. He started the first five games of the season and the Apple Cup (vs. Washington State) before missing four games in the middle of the year with the same shoulder injury that forced him to miss the final seven games of 2002. Alexander netted three of the 25 longest kickoff returns in Washington history during the 2001 season, leading the Pac-10 Conference (6th among all NCAA players) with a 29.2 kickoff return average. Additionally, he tied for sixth in the conference with four interceptions and broke up 11 passes to tie Chico Fraley (1990) for the third-best single-season mark in UW history. Alexander became just the eighth player in Washington annals to score multiple special teams touchdowns in the same year (2001), returning a fourth-quarter blocked field goal 77 yards for the go-ahead score against Michigan and returning a kick 95 yards for a touchdown against Idaho.

== Professional career ==
Alexander signed with the Denver Broncos as an undrafted free agent on April 26, 2004, following the 2004 NFL draft. As a rookie, he was assigned to cover Reggie Wayne during a playoff game against the Indianapolis Colts, who won the game as Wayne caught 10 passes.

== Rape allegations ==
Roc Alexander has been accused by at least two different individuals of sexually assaulting them. The lawsuits filed against him claim that the University of Washington athletics department pressured the complainants to withdraw their allegations, in order to avoid negative publicity and the possibility of Roc Alexander leaving UW for another university if suspended. Roc Alexander also pleaded guilty to a misdemeanor assault charge in Chelan, Washington in 2003.
