= Odyssey School =

Location
- San Mateo, California; United States; 37.534211°N 122.349311°W

Information
- Type: Private, Coeducational
- Established: 1998
- Head of school: Jon Hale
- Faculty: 11 full-time; 4 part-time
- Enrollment: ~ 50 students
- Classes: One class/grade, ~15 students/class
- Campus: Suburban, 3.5 acres (0.7 km²)
- Website: Official website

Odyssey School is a private middle school in San Mateo, California, a town about 15 miles (24 km) south of San Francisco. Founded in 1998, Odyssey caters to students in grades 6 through 8. The school offers a rigorous, fast-paced academic program for highly-motivated students. Its five academic core subjects consist of mathematics, science, history/ social studies, language arts, and Japanese. Other courses include creative arts, karate, social and emotional learning, and various faculty-chosen electives. Students may elect to pursue advanced courses including mathematics (up to pre-calculus in 8th grade) and accelerated Japanese studies.

Odyssey is an expeditionary learning school, with up to seven yearly expeditions designed to enhance students' academic and personal growth. These include expeditions to the Channel Islands, Mount Whitney, the Oregon Shakespeare Festival in Ashland, Oregon, and a final three-week to trip to Japan at the end of eighth grade.

Many Odyssey graduates attend college-preparatory schools such as Woodside Priory School, Crystal Springs Uplands School, Junípero Serra High School, and Menlo School, as well as local public high schools. Odyssey graduates later continue their studies at four-year colleges and universities such as UC Berkeley, Stanford, Duke, and NYU.

Odyssey's founding Head of School, Stephen K. Smuin, was a teacher and school administrator for many years. He had been head of middle school at the Nueva School, a private K-12 school in Hillsborough, California, but was ousted by the school board following allegations of abusive behavior towards a former student. He is the author of three books on writing technique, including "More than Metaphors: Strategies for Teaching Process Writing."

Smuin retired in June 2010. In July 2010, Daniel Popplewell joined Odyssey as its new Head of School. Popplewell had been dean of teaching and learning at Bentley School in Lafayette, California. He was succeeded in July 2013 by Stephen P. Lane, who had been head of Santa Barbara Middle School.

After a decade as head, Lane stepped down in July 2023 and was succeeded by Jon Hale, a math teacher at Odyssey since 2012 and assistant head of school under Lane.
