= Stanley Krueber =

American writer (1982–1987)

Stanley Lee Krueber (August 28, 1892 – November 10, 1987) was an American fiction author known primarily for his pulp stories. He is best known for creating the fictional character: Achak, King of the Jungle. He was somewhat notorious for reworking other peoples' stories (at his editors' request) in order to meet his deadlines.

Krueber was born in Missouri, but his parents soon moved to Colorado Springs, Colorado. He grew up in Colorado and later worked as a ranch hand at one of the many ranches of the surrounding area.

During the 1910s, Krueber started to sell stories to the pulp magazines that were becoming popular in the era. Krueber attempted to enlist in the armed forces when the United States joined World War I in 1917, but was denied entry because of an undefined heart condition. He wrote in many genres, first in the pulps and later in the upscale "slick" magazines, but never achieved a high degree of success or fame. During this time he also found work as an illustrator of pulp covers.

Krueber never became financially secure as a result of his work in the pulps and held many different jobs (including briefly starting a small newspaper) while pursuing his writing career. Many of his science fiction stories were shorter than 1,000 words, or even 500 words. These stories were popular among magazine editors because their short length made the stories useful for filling out a magazine's page layout.

He died on November 10, 1987, and is buried in Colorado Springs, Colorado.
