= Aspen School District 1 =

School district in Colorado, United States

Aspen School District 1 is a school district headquartered in Aspen, Colorado. It is one of two school districts in Pitkin County, where it covers Aspen, Woody Creek, and much of Snowmass Village.

In 2024, Tharyn Mulberry became the superintendent, effective on July 1. Around that time, the district was in the process of establishing housing units for employees.

== Schools ==
- Aspen High School
- Aspen Middle School
- Aspen Elementary School
- The Cottage Preschool (preschool)
- Aspen Community School (charter school)
