= Early College of Denver High School =

Location
- 3001 S. Federal Blvd. SW Denver; Denver, Colorado 80236
- Coordinates: 39.661551°N 105.026622°W

Information
- Funding type: Charter school
- Motto: All paths lead to college
- Established: 2004
- Closed: 2020
- School district: Denver 1
- CEO/Principal: Halley Joseph
- Grades: 9 to 12
- Average class size: 24
- Classes offered: College readiness and college courses
- Mascot: Gladiator
- Tuition: $0

Early College of Denver High School, formerly known as Southwest Early College, was a charter school in Denver, Colorado. The school closed in 2020, among a series of closures charter schools in Denver Public Schools in the same period, due to declining enrollment.
