= Colorado High School Activities Association =

High school governing body in Colorado, US

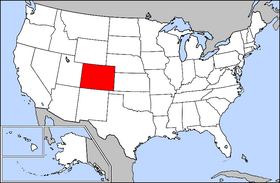
- Abbreviation: CHSAA
- Formation: 1921
- Type: NPO
- Legal status: Association
- Purpose: Athletic/Educational
- Headquarters: 14855 E. 2nd Avenue; Aurora, CO 80011
- Region served: Colorado
- Members: 367 high schools
- Commissioner: Michael Krueger
- Board President: Ryan West
- Associate Commissioner: Bethany Brookens
- Affiliations: National Federation of State High School Associations
- Staff: 23
- Website: chsaanow.com
- Remarks: (303) 344-5050

The Colorado High School Activities Association (CHSAA) is the governing body for high school activities in the U.S. state of Colorado. It was founded in 1921, and as of the 2022–23 school year has a membership of 367 full-time high schools, plus more than 50 middle and junior high schools, for a total of more than 400 schools. The Association hold championships for 29 different sports for both boys and girls, plus competitions in esports, music, sportsmanship, student council, and spirit.

The schools are organised into a number of 'leagues', such as the Arkansas Valley League.

== Sports ==
Source: CHSAA website

Fall

- Boys cross country
- Girls cross country
- Field hockey
- (American) Football
- Boys golf
- Gymnastics
- Boys soccer
- Softball
- Spirit
- Boys tennis
- Unified bowling
- Girls volleyball
- Flag football

Winter

- Boys basketball
- Girls basketball
- Ice hockey
- Skiing
- Girls swimming & diving
- Boys wrestling
- Girls wrestling

Spring

- Baseball
- Girls golf
- Boys lacrosse
- Girls lacrosse
- Girls soccer
- Boys swimming & diving
- Girls tennis
- Boys track & field
- Girls track & field
- Boys volleyball

== Activities ==
- Esports
- Music
- Speech and Debate
- Sportsmanship
- Student leadership

== CHSAANow.com ==
CHSAA's website covers the organization's athletics and activities. In addition to game coverage and features, the site also produces weekly rankings during the regular season, as well as All-State teams.
