= National Register of Historic Places listings in Pueblo County, Colorado =

Location of Pueblo County in Colorado

This is a list of the National Register of Historic Places listings in Pueblo County, Colorado, USA.

It is intended to be a complete list of the properties and districts on the National Register of Historic Places in Pueblo County, Colorado. The locations of National Register properties and districts for which the latitude and longitude coordinates are included below, may be seen in a map.

There are 69 properties and districts listed on the National Register in the county, one of which is also designated a National Historic Landmark. Another six properties was once listed but has been removed.

This National Park Service list is complete through NPS recent listings posted August 28, 2026.

== Current listings ==
	Name on the Register	Image	Date listed	Location	City or town	Description
1	Barndollar–Gann House	Barndollar–Gann House	November 7, 1985 (#85002761)	1906 Court St. 38°17′06″N 104°36′34″W	Pueblo	
2	Baxter House	Baxter House	February 17, 1978 (#78000876)	325 W. 15th St. 38°16′51″N 104°36′40″W	Pueblo	
3	Allen J. Beaumont House	Allen J. Beaumont House	August 18, 1983 (#83001328)	425 W. 15th St. 38°16′51″N 104°36′45″W	Pueblo	
4	Dr. John A. Black House Complex	Dr. John A. Black House Complex	November 7, 1985 (#85002760)	102 W. Pitkin Ave. 38°15′24″N 104°37′29″W	Pueblo	
5	Boone Santa Fe Railroad Depot	Boone Santa Fe Railroad Depot	June 27, 1997 (#97000618)	100 Baker Ave. 38°14′55″N 104°15′23″W	Boone	
6	Bowen Mansion	Bowen Mansion	January 9, 1978 (#78000877)	229 W. 12th St. 38°16′42″N 104°36′34″W	Pueblo	
7	Butler House		August 16, 1984 (#84000880)	6916 Broadacre Rd. 38°00′43″N 104°27′17″W	Avondale	Ranch complex on Huerfano River dating from 1865 or 1880.
8	James N. Carlile House	James N. Carlile House	February 8, 1985 (#85000297)	44 Carlile Pl. 38°16′11″N 104°37′43″W	Pueblo	
9	Central High School	Central High School	November 14, 1979 (#79000619)	431 E. Pitkin Ave. 38°15′11″N 104°37′13″W	Pueblo	
10	Central Junior High School-Keating Junior High School	Central Junior High School-Keating Junior High School	December 7, 2020 (#100005855)	215 East Orman Ave. 38°15′12″N 104°37′32″W	Pueblo	
11	City Park Carousel	City Park Carousel	April 21, 1983 (#83001297)	City Park; 38°15′44″N 104°39′17″W	Pueblo	
12	Colorado Building	Colorado Building	April 17, 1992 (#92000315)	401-411 N. Main St. 38°16′15″N 104°36′30″W	Pueblo	
13	Colorado State Hospital Superintendent's House	Colorado State Hospital Superintendent's House	September 26, 1985 (#85002563)	13th and Francisco Sts. 38°16′50″N 104°37′26″W	Pueblo	
14	Coronado Lodge	Coronado Lodge	March 30, 2020 (#100005146)	2130 Lake Ave. 38°13′49″N 104°37′29″W	Pueblo	
15	Doyle Settlement	Doyle Settlement	April 10, 1980 (#80000922)	Southeast of Pueblo on Doyle Rd. 38°03′30″N 104°24′51″W	Pueblo	
16	Nathaniel W. Duke House	Nathaniel W. Duke House	February 8, 1985 (#85000229)	1409 Craig St. 38°16′48″N 104°37′05″W	Pueblo	Queen Anne house of pioneer-era groceries businessman
17	Edison School	Edison School	June 19, 1985 (#85001330)	900 W. Mesa; 38°14′48″N 104°36′06″W	Pueblo	
18	Eighth Street Baptist Church	Eighth Street Baptist Church	July 1, 2024 (#100010502)	600 W. 8th Street; 38°16′27″N 104°36′54″W	Pueblo	
19	El Pueblo	El Pueblo	February 16, 1996 (#96000039)	Junction of 1st St. and Union Ave. 38°16′03″N 104°36′35″W	Pueblo	
20	First Congregational Church	First Congregational Church	February 8, 1985 (#85000230)	225 W. Evans; 38°15′37″N 104°37′57″W	Pueblo	
21	First Methodist Episcopal Church	First Methodist Episcopal Church	November 14, 1979 (#79000620)	400 Broadway St. 38°15′19″N 104°37′23″W	Pueblo	
22	First Methodist Episcopal Church	First Methodist Episcopal Church	April 16, 2012 (#12000201)	310 W. 11th St. 38°16′37″N 104°36′39″W	Pueblo	
23	Fitch Terrace	Fitch Terrace	October 2, 1986 (#86002809)	401, 403, 405, 407, 409, and 411 W. 11th St. 38°16′39″N 104°36′42″W	Pueblo	
24	R.T. Frazier House	R.T. Frazier House	June 19, 1985 (#85001329)	2121 N. Elizabeth St. 38°17′18″N 104°36′55″W	Pueblo	Craftsman-style house built in 1915 for leading saddlemaker R.T. Frazier
25	Galligan House	Galligan House	June 3, 1982 (#82002311)	501 Colorado Ave. 38°15′19″N 104°37′34″W	Pueblo	
26	Gast Mansion	Gast Mansion	June 3, 1982 (#82002312)	1801 Greenwood St. 38°17′02″N 104°36′47″W	Pueblo	
27	Goodnight Barn	Goodnight Barn	July 30, 1974 (#74002278)	West of Pueblo at State Highway 96 and Siloam Rd. 38°15′26″N 104°41′27″W	Pueblo	
28	Hazelhurst	Hazelhurst	December 15, 1978 (#78000879)	905 Berkley Ave. 38°15′03″N 104°37′47″W	Pueblo	
29	Henkel-Duke Mercantile Company Warehouse	Henkel-Duke Mercantile Company Warehouse	May 17, 1984 (#84000881)	212-222 W. 3rd Ave. 38°16′10″N 104°36′31″W	Pueblo	
30	Huerfano Bridge	Huerfano Bridge	February 4, 1985 (#85000226)	U.S. Highway 50; 38°13′32″N 104°15′41″W	Boone	5-span filled spandrel arch completed in 1921
31	Indian Petroglyphs and Pictographs		May 3, 1976 (#76000566)	Address Restricted	Penrose vicinity	Known as "Indian Petroglyphs and Pictographs / Turkey Creek Canyon Rock Art District" by History Colorado, while official NRHP listing name is just "Indian Petroglyphs and Pictographs".
32	Dr. Alexander T. King House and Carriage House	Dr. Alexander T. King House and Carriage House	April 21, 1983 (#83001329)	229 Quincy St. and 215 W. Routt Ave. 38°15′33″N 104°37′28″W	Pueblo	
33	McClelland Orphanage	McClelland Orphanage	January 30, 1992 (#91002043)	415 E. Abriendo Ave. 38°15′22″N 104°37′00″W	Pueblo	
34	Mechanics Building/Masonic Building	Mechanics Building/Masonic Building	June 16, 1983 (#83001330)	207-211 N. Main St. 38°16′09″N 104°36′30″W	Pueblo	
35	Minnequa Steel Works Office Building and Dispensary, Colorado Fuel and Iron Company	Minnequa Steel Works Office Building and Dispensary, Colorado Fuel and Iron Company	June 6, 2002 (#02000628)	215 and 225 Canal St. 38°14′17″N 104°36′45″W	Pueblo	Designated a National Historic Landmark in 2021; first major steel works west of the Mississippi.
36	Montgomery Ward Building	Montgomery Ward Building	December 24, 1996 (#85003697)	225 N. Main St. 38°16′10″N 104°36′30″W	Pueblo	
37	Orman-Adams House	Orman-Adams House	July 13, 1976 (#76000567)	102 W. Orman Ave. 38°15′17″N 104°37′39″W	Pueblo	
38	Pitkin Place Historic District	Pitkin Place Historic District	January 31, 1978 (#78000880)	Southern side of the 300 block of W. Pitkin Pl. 38°15′32″N 104°37′40″W	Pueblo	
39	Frank Pryor House	Frank Pryor House	February 8, 1985 (#85000231)	1325 Greenwood St. 38°16′47″N 104°36′46″W	Pueblo	
40	Pueblo Christopher Columbus Monument	Pueblo Christopher Columbus Monument	August 31, 2011 (#11000608)	Median in 100 block of E. Abriendo Ave. 38°15′34″N 104°37′15″W	Pueblo	
41	Pueblo City Park Zoo	Pueblo City Park Zoo	July 28, 1995 (#95000934)	3455 Nuckolls Ave. 38°15′43″N 104°39′20″W	Pueblo	
42	Pueblo County Courthouse	Pueblo County Courthouse	June 27, 1975 (#75000534)	10th and Main Sts. 38°16′36″N 104°36′32″W	Pueblo	
43	Pueblo Federal Building	Pueblo Federal Building	January 3, 1978 (#78000881)	421 N. Main St. 38°16′16″N 104°36′30″W	Pueblo	
44	Pueblo Mountain Park	Pueblo Mountain Park	December 6, 1994 (#94001343)	1 mile south of County Road 220 on S. Pine Dr. (State Route 78) in the San Isabel National Forest; 38°02′41″N 105°00′20″W	Beulah	
45	Quaker Flour Mill	Quaker Flour Mill	September 30, 1976 (#76000568)	102 S. Oneida St. 38°15′45″N 104°36′32″W	Pueblo	
46	Ward Rice House	Ward Rice House	November 7, 1985 (#85002762)	1825 Grand Ave. 38°17′03″N 104°36′42″W	Pueblo	
47	Rood Candy Company Building	Rood Candy Company Building	May 17, 1984 (#84000882)	408-416 W. 7th St. 38°16′23″N 104°36′43″W	Pueblo	
48	Roselawn Cemetery	Roselawn Cemetery	June 19, 2017 (#100001212)	1706 Roselawn Rd. 38°14′31″N 104°34′47″W	Pueblo	
49	Rosemount	Rosemount	July 30, 1974 (#74000592)	419 W. 14th St. 38°16′49″N 104°36′44″W	Pueblo	
50	Sacred Heart Church	Sacred Heart Church	February 21, 1989 (#89000037)	1025 N. Grand Ave. 38°16′36″N 104°36′42″W	Pueblo	
51	Sacred Heart Orphanage	Sacred Heart Orphanage	March 3, 1989 (#89000038)	2316 Sprague St. 38°14′27″N 104°38′18″W	Pueblo	
52	Santa Fe Avenue Bridge	Santa Fe Avenue Bridge	October 15, 2002 (#02001149)	U.S. Highway 50 at milepost 1.33; 38°15′15″N 104°36′23″W	Pueblo	
53	Squirrel Creek Recreational Unit	Squirrel Creek Recreational Unit	March 28, 2005 (#05000215)	San Isabel National Forest; 38°03′03″N 105°02′24″W	Beulah	
54	St. Charles Bridge	St. Charles Bridge	February 4, 1985 (#85000228)	County Road 65; 38°12′03″N 104°32′46″W	Pueblo	
55	St. Charles River Bridge		October 15, 2002 (#02001131)	US 50 at milepost 7.77; 38°14′44″N 104°29′23″W	Pueblo	Replaced in 2006
56	St. John's Greek Orthodox Church	St. John's Greek Orthodox Church	February 28, 2002 (#02000123)	1000-1010 Spruce St. 38°14′58″N 104°37′00″W	Pueblo	
57	St. Paul African Methodist Episcopal (AME) Church	St. Paul African Methodist Episcopal (AME) Church	March 10, 2023 (#100008733)	613 West Mesa Ave. 38°14′46″N 104°37′06″W	Pueblo	
58	Star Journal Model Home	Star Journal Model Home	February 16, 1984 (#84000886)	2920 High St. 38°17′55″N 104°37′33″W	Pueblo	
59	Charles H. Stickney House	Charles H. Stickney House	February 8, 1985 (#85000232)	101 E. Orman Ave. 38°15′16″N 104°37′36″W	Pueblo	
60	J.L. Streit House	J.L. Streit House	September 20, 1984 (#84000892)	2201 Grand Ave. 38°17′19″N 104°36′42″W	Pueblo	
61	Temple Emanuel	Temple Emanuel	March 14, 1996 (#96000273)	1325 N. Grand Ave. 38°16′47″N 104°36′44″W	Pueblo	Reform Jewish synagogue built in 1900, in Queen Anne style incorporating Richardsonian Romanesque elements
62	Tooke-Nuckolls House	Tooke-Nuckolls House	November 7, 1985 (#85002763)	38 Carlile Pl. 38°16′10″N 104°37′45″W	Pueblo	
63	Tutt Building	Tutt Building	August 18, 1983 (#83001331)	421 Central Plaza; 38°16′07″N 104°36′29″W	Pueblo	
64	Union Avenue Historic Commercial District	Union Avenue Historic Commercial District	December 28, 1982 (#82001021)	Roughly bounded by railroad tracks, Main St., Grand and Victoria Aves. 38°15′51″N 104°36′48″W	Pueblo	
65	Union Depot	Union Depot	April 1, 1975 (#75000535)	Victoria and B Sts. 38°15′46″N 104°36′59″W	Pueblo	
66	Vail Hotel	Vail Hotel	December 18, 1978 (#78000882)	217 S. Grand Ave. 38°15′59″N 104°37′18″W	Pueblo	
67	Martin Walter House	Martin Walter House	May 17, 1984 (#84000894)	300 W. Abriendo Ave. 38°15′42″N 104°37′28″W	Pueblo	American Foursquare mansion built for founder of Pueblo Brewery
68	Asbury White House	Asbury White House	October 11, 1984 (#84000025)	417 W. 11th St. 38°16′38″N 104°36′42″W	Pueblo	
69	Young Women's Christian Association	Young Women's Christian Association	March 24, 1980 (#80000921)	801 N. Santa Fe Ave. 38°16′28″N 104°36′24″W	Pueblo	

== Former listings ==
	Name on the Register	Image	Date listed	Date removed	Location	City or town	Description
1	Avondale Bridge	Avondale Bridge	February 4, 1985 (#85000225)	March 27, 2017	County Road 327; 38°14′32″N 104°20′54″W	Avondale	No longer exists. Replaced in 2005.
2	Farris Hotel		November 13, 1985 (#85003473)	April 22, 1991	315 N. Union Ave.	Pueblo	Demolished February 16, 1991.
3	J. S. Glass Clothing Store		September 18, 1978 (#85003473)	April 22, 1991	308 S. Union Ave.	Pueblo	Destroyed by fire February 6, 1983.
4	T. G. McCarthy House		May 22, 1986 (#86001122)	February 27, 1995	817 N. Grand Ave.	Pueblo	Demolished 1990.
5	Nepesta Bridge	Nepesta Bridge	February 4, 1985 (#85000227)	July 22, 1994	County Road 613 over Arkansas River	Boone	Replaced in 1989
6	Woodcroft Sanatorium		December 3, 1985 (#85003101)	April 22, 1991	1300 W. Abriendo Ave.	Pueblo	Destroyed by fire February 10, 1988.

== See also ==
- List of National Historic Landmarks in Colorado
- List of National Register of Historic Places in Colorado
- Bibliography of Colorado
- Geography of Colorado
- History of Colorado
- Index of Colorado-related articles
- List of Colorado-related lists
- Outline of Colorado
