= Charles Albert Buswell =

American prelate

His Excellency, The Most Reverend Charles Albert Buswell
- Bishop of Pueblo
- See: Diocese of Pueblo
- In office: September 30, 1959; September 19, 1979
- Predecessor: Joseph Clement Willging
- Successor: Arthur Nicholas Tafoya

Orders
- Ordination: July 9, 1939 by Paulin Ladeuze
- Consecration: September 30, 1959 by Bishop Victor Reed

Personal details
- Born: October 15, 1913 Homestead, Oklahoma, USA
- Died: June 14, 2008 (aged 94)
- Denomination: Roman Catholic
- Education: St. Benedict's College; Kenrick-Glennon Seminary; The American College of the Immaculate Conception
- Motto: Pax semper et caritas (Peace always and love)

Styles of Charles Buswell
- Reference style: The Most Reverend
- Spoken style: Your Excellency
- Religious style: Monsignor
- Posthumous style: none

Charles Albert Buswell (October 15, 1913 – June 14, 2008) was an American prelate of the Roman Catholic Church who served as bishop of the Diocese of Pueblo in Colorado from 1959 to 1979.

== Biography ==
=== Early life ===
Charles Buswell was born on October 15, 1913, in Homestead, Oklahoma, to Charles and Bridget Buswell. Soon after his birth, the family moved to Oklahoma City, Oklahoma. Charles Buswell received his primary and secondary education at the cathedral's St. Joseph School, then studied for two years at St. Benedict's College in Atchison, Kansas. In 1933, he entered St. Louis Preparatory Seminary in Webster Groves, Missouri.

After studying theology at Kenrick-Glennon Seminary in St. Louis, Missouri, Buswell entered in 1936 the American College of the Immaculate Conception in Leuven, Belgium. He was known there as "both a serious student and a congenial companion among his fellow seminarians." He also served as prefect and assistant editor of The American College Bulletin during his studies.

=== Priesthood ===
Buswell was ordained to the priesthood by Bishop Paulin Ladeuze in Belgium for the Diocese of Oklahoma City-Tulsa on July 9, 1939. After returning to Oklahoma, he was named assistant pastor of a parish in Tonkawa, Oklahoma, and of Our Lady of Perpetual Help Cathedral Parish in Oklahoma City. Buswell, after being made diocesan vice-chancellor, became the first pastor of Christ the King Parish in 1947. At Christ the King, he placed emphasis on the greater involvement of the laity. He was raised to the rank of a privy chamberlain of his holiness in 1949, and a domestic prelate of his holiness in 1955.

=== Bishop of Pueblo ===
On August 8, 1959, Buswell was appointed as the second bishop of Pueblo by Pope John XXIII. He was consecrated at the Cathedral of Our Lady of Perpetual Help on September 30, 1959, by Bishop Victor Reed, with Bishop s Stephen Leven and Glennon Flavin serving as co-consecrators.

Buswell attended the Second Vatican Council in Rome from 1962 to 1965. He later described the council's mission as making the Catholic Church "a dynamic organism to penetrate the world with a spirit of truth and light" and not "a static remnant of past glory". He also spoke of opening its windows "to let in fresh air and bring in a new vision that prepares the world for new responsibility for the world in which we live." Following the introduction of the mass in English, Buswell criticized the English translation of the Gloria.

In 1973, the Vatican banned the practice of separating a child's first communion from first confession. Buswell responded by saying, "I am convinced that the reception of first communion before first confession is based on good theology, is rooted in solid findings of the behavioral sciences, and is excellent pastoral practice." He promised to continue the practice until the Vatican's decree received the "mature consideration" of American bishops and educators.

=== Retirement and legacy ===
Pope John Paul II accepted Buswell's resignation as bishop of Pueblo on September 19, 1979. In 1982, Catholics Act for ERA announced that Buswell had expressed his support for the proposed Equal Rights Amendment. The amendment failed ratification.

A frequent visitor to American College in Leuven, Buswell served as "pastor in residence" there from 1985 to 1986. For the 150th anniversary of the foundation of the college in 2006, he was awarded the DeBecker Medal. Although unable to attend the ceremony, he was presented with the medal in the following December.

Charles Buswell died on June 14, 2008, at age 94.

Catholic Church titles
Preceded by Joseph Clement Willging	Bishop of Pueblo; 1959–1979	Succeeded by Arthur Nicholas Tafoya
