= Rumaldo Chavez House =

Historic house in New Mexico, United States

- U.S. National Register of Historic Places
- NM State Register of Cultural Properties
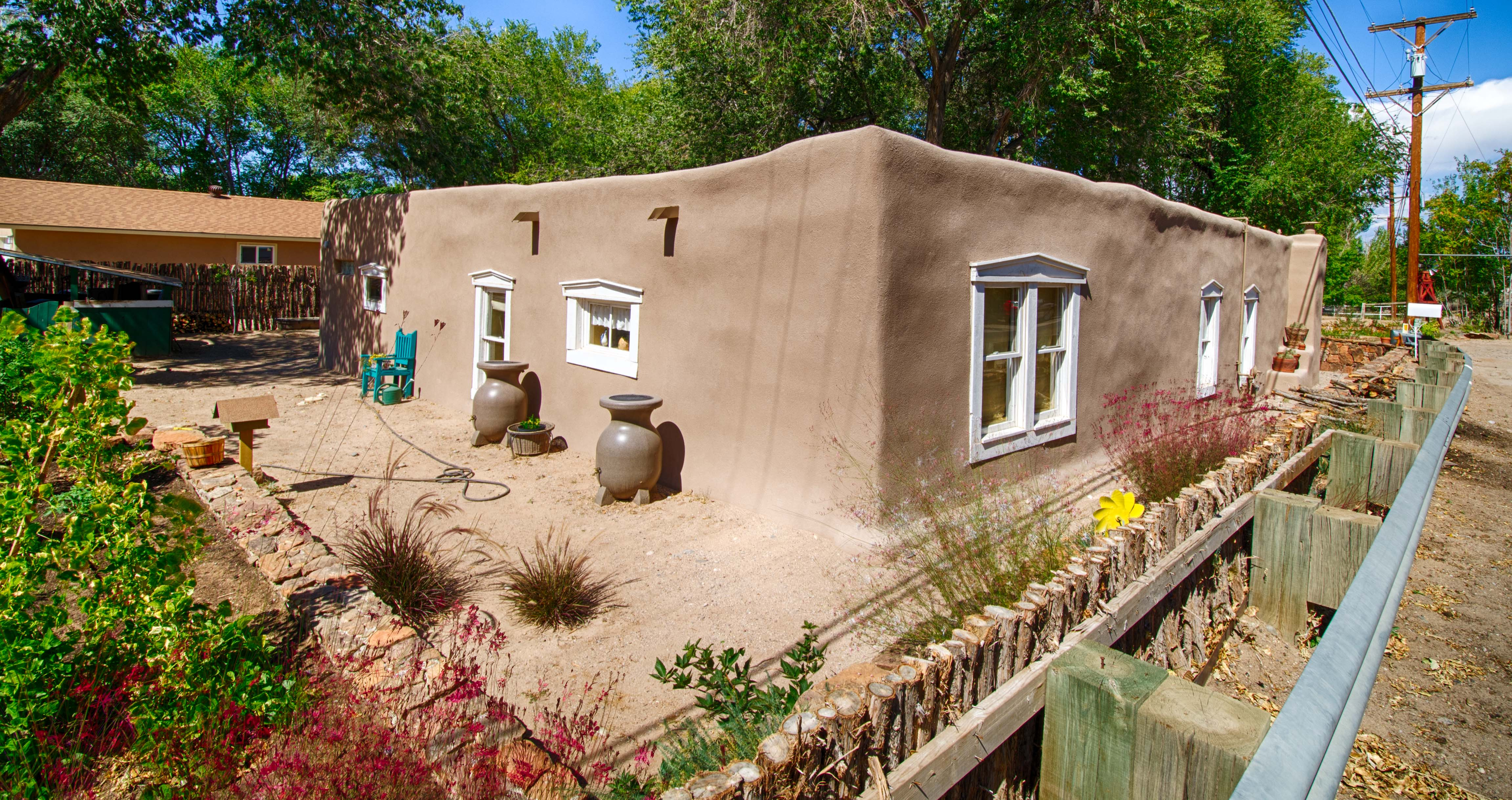
- The house in 2012

- Location within New Mexico Location within the United States
- Location: 10023 Edith Blvd. NE, Alameda, New Mexico
- Coordinates: 35°11′35″N 106°36′11″W
- Built: c. 1860
- Architectural style: Territorial
- NRHP reference No.: 80002530
- NMSRCP No.: 780

Significant dates
- Added to NRHP: November 24, 1980
- Designated NMSRCP: September 16, 1980

The Rumaldo Chavez House is a historic house located north of Albuquerque, New Mexico, in the unincorporated village of Alameda. The date of construction is unknown but it was probably built in the 1860s or earlier, possibly by Rumaldo Chavez, whose family lived in Alameda since at least the 1840s. By 1927, his daughter-in-law Aurelia H. de Chavez was listed as the owner. The house was added to the New Mexico State Register of Cultural Properties and the National Register of Historic Places in 1980. It is located immediately to the east of another historic building, the Domingo Tafoya House.

The house is a one-story, flat-roofed building constructed from terrones, large adobe bricks, with outer walls 24 inches (61 cm) thick. It contains six rooms arranged in an L shape. Five of the rooms probably date to the original construction of the house and have ceilings with exposed vigas, plank floors, and separate exterior doorways. Most of the windows are 1-over-1 wood-framed sash windows and probably date to the late 1800s.
