= Barndollar =

Barndollar may refer to:

- Gladys H. Lent-Barndollar (ca. 1872–1938), American business executive and clubwoman
- Harry Barndollar, American Republican politician in California
- Barndollar–Gann House in Pueblo, Colorado; NRHP-listed
