= Domingo Tafoya House =

Historic house in New Mexico, United States

- U.S. National Register of Historic Places
- NM State Register of Cultural Properties
- Location within New Mexico Location within the United States
- Location: 10021 Edith Blvd. NE, Alameda, New Mexico
- Coordinates: 35°11′35″N 106°36′12″W
- Architectural style: Territorial
- NRHP reference No.: 80002528
- NMSRCP No.: 786

Significant dates
- Added to NRHP: November 17, 1980
- Designated NMSRCP: September 16, 1980

The Domingo Tafoya House is a historic house located north of Albuquerque, New Mexico, in the unincorporated village of Alameda. The date of construction is unknown but it was probably built in the 1850s or earlier, possibly by Domingo Tafoya, whose family lived in Alameda since at least 1839. The Tafoya family continued to own the home at least until the 1980s. The house was added to the New Mexico State Register of Cultural Properties and the National Register of Historic Places in 1980. It is located immediately to the west of another historic building, the Rumaldo Chavez House.

The house is a one-story adobe building containing five rooms arranged in an L shape. Four of the rooms probably date to the original construction of the house; the fifth is a kitchen that was added in the 1930s. The rooms are connected by low interior doorways under 6 feet (1.8 m) high, and one room has exposed original ceiling beams and floorboards. The house was modified during the 20th century with the installation of new doors and windows and a hipped roof dating to the 1960s.
