= Goodnight Barn =

Historic barn in Pueblo, Colorado, US

- U.S. National Register of Historic Places
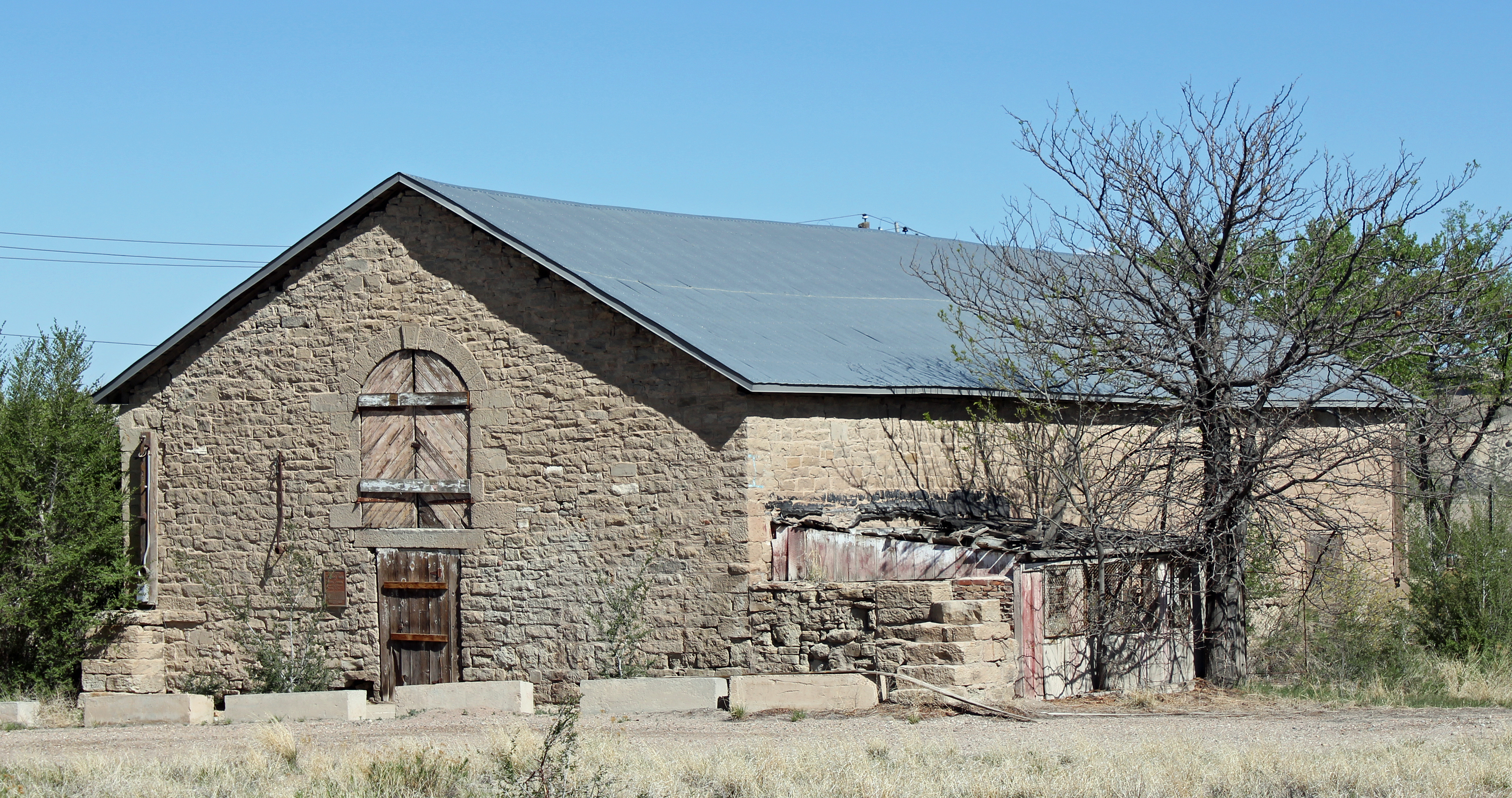

- Location within Colorado
- Location: 5475 CO 96, Pueblo, Colorado, U.S.
- Coordinates: 38°15′26″N 104°41′27″W
- Area: 1.5 acres (0.61 ha)
- Built: 1871
- Website: goodnightbarnpueblo.org
- NRHP reference No.: 74002278
- Added to NRHP: July 30, 1974

Goodnight Barn in Pueblo, Colorado, is a historic 1871 agricultural barn from the former Goodnight Ranch. It is one of the oldest barns in the area. The Goodnight Barn Preservation Committee offers tours of the site. It was listed on the National Register of Historic Places since 1974.

== History ==
The Goodnight Barn (1871) at 5475 Colorado State Highway 96 is all that remains of the Goodnight Ranch (also known as the Rock Canon Ranch) founded in 1869 by Charles Goodnight. Goodnight was the first to set up an extensive cattle ranching industry in the state of Colorado. The barn was built using native sandstone, quarried locally.

From 2019 to 2021, the barn was restored by the Goodnight Barn Preservation Committee and other organizations.

== See also ==
- National Register of Historic Places listings in Pueblo County, Colorado
