= Joseph Clement Willging =

American prelate

His Excellency, The Most Reverend Joseph Clement Willging
- Bishop of Pueblo
- See: Diocese of Pueblo
- In office: February 24, 1942; March 3, 1959
- Successor: Charles Albert Buswell

Orders
- Ordination: June 20, 1908 by James Gibbons
- Consecration: February 24, 1942 by Amleto Giovanni Cicognani

Personal details
- Born: September 6, 1884 Dubuque, Iowa, US
- Died: March 3, 1959 (aged 74) Denver, Colorado, US
- Denomination: Roman Catholic
- Education: Columbia College; St. Mary's Seminary; Catholic University of America
- Motto: Deus spes mea (God is my hope)

Joseph Clement Willging (September 6, 1884 – March 3, 1959) was an American prelate of the Roman Catholic Church. He served as the first bishop of the new Diocese of Pueblo in Colorado from 1942 until his death in 1959.

== Biography ==
=== Early life ===
Joseph Willging was born on September 6, 1884, in Dubuque, Iowa, to Henry and Elizabeth (née Hanover) Willging. He attended St. Mary's School (1891–1898) and Columbia College (1898–1905), both in Dubuque. Willging then went to Baltimore, Maryland, to study at St. Mary's Seminary, earning a Bachelor of Sacred Theology degree in 1908.

=== Priesthood ===
Willging was ordained to the priesthood in Baltimore by Cardinal James Gibbons for the Diocese of Helena on June 20, 1908. He then studied at Catholic University of America in Washington, D.C., for a year. Returning to Montana, Willging was appointed principal of St. Aloysius Institute in Helena, in 1909. He taught at Carroll College in Helena from 1910 to 1914, returning during that period to Catholic University for one year. Willging then served as chancellor of the diocese until 1927, when he became pastor of Immaculate Conception Parish in Butte, Montana. The Vatican elevated Willging to the rank of papal chamberlain in 1921 and to domestic prelate in 1939. That same year, he was named vicar general of the diocese.

=== Bishop of Pueblo ===
On December 6, 1941, Willging was appointed the first bishop of Pueblo by Pope Pius XII. He received his episcopal consecration at Saint Helena Cathedral in Helena on February 24, 1942, from Archbishop Amleto Cicognani, with Archbishop Henry Rohlman and Bishop Joseph Michael Gilmore serving as co-consecrators. During his 17-year-long tenure, Willging increased the number of parishes from 39 to 60, and the number of priests from 84 to 151. He also encouraged the establishment of parochial schools and Catholic hospitals.

Joseph Willging died of a heart attack at St. Thomas Seminary in Denver, Colorado, on March 3, 1959, at age 74.

Catholic Church titles
Preceded by none	Bishop of Pueblo; 1942–1959	Succeeded by Charles Albert Buswell
