= Diocese of Pueblo =

Latin Catholic ecclesiastical jurisdiction in Colorado, USA

Coordinates: 38°16′01″N 104°37′13″W

Diocese of Pueblo Dioecesis Pueblensis
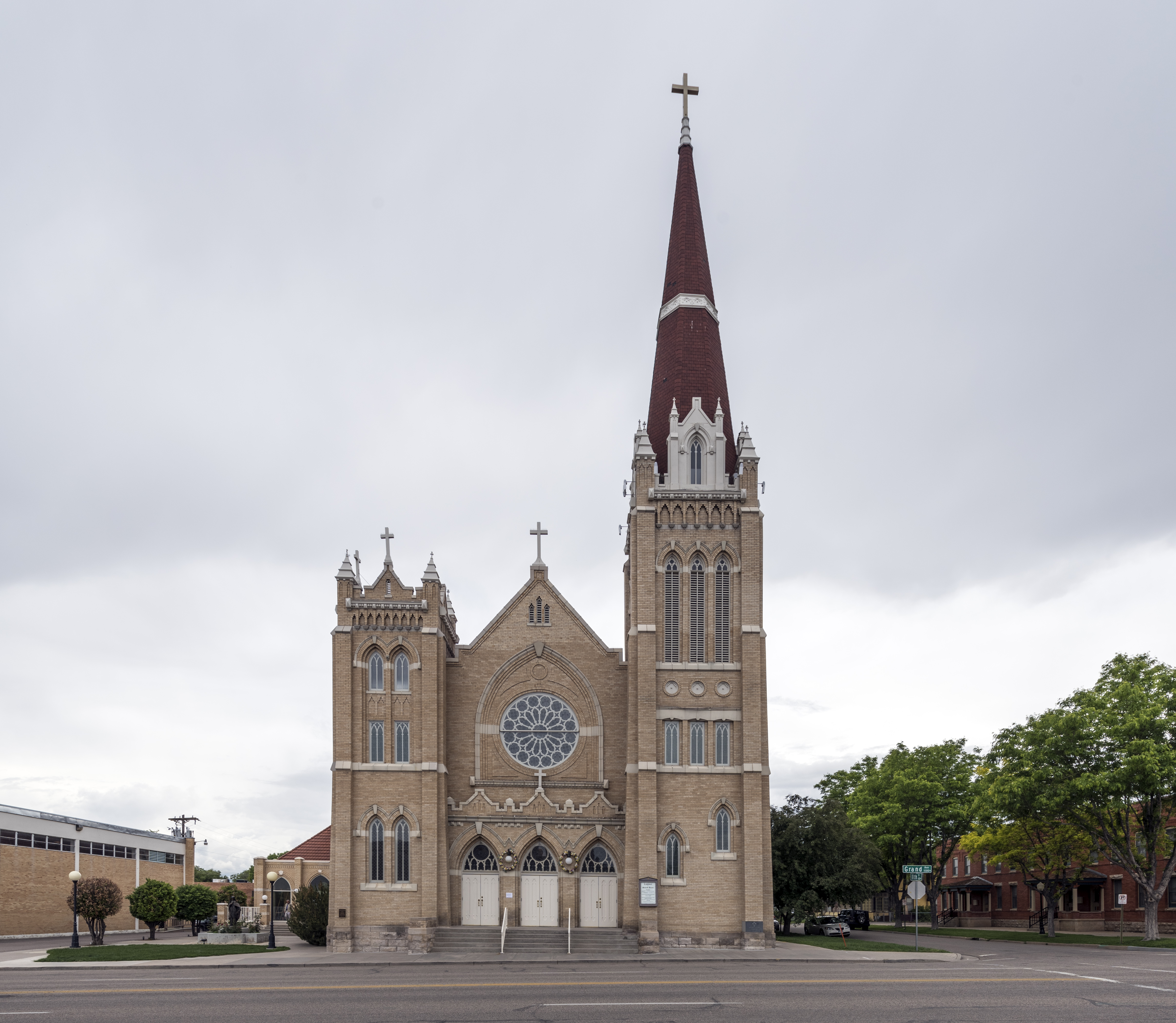
- Cathedral of the Sacred Heart

- Coat of arms

Location
- Country: United States
- Territory: Southern half of Colorado
- Ecclesiastical province: Province of Denver
- Population: 110,200 (18.3%)

Information
- Denomination: Catholic
- Sui iuris church: Latin Church
- Rite: Roman Rite
- Established: November 15, 1941
- Cathedral: Cathedral of the Sacred Heart
- Patron saint: St. Therese of Lisieux

Current leadership
- Pope: Leo XIV
- Bishop: Stephen Jay Berg
- Metropolitan Archbishop: James R. Golka
- Bishops emeritus: Fernando Isern

Map
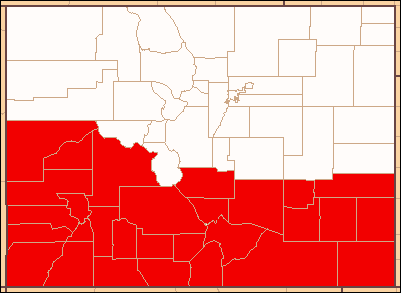

Website
- dioceseofpueblo.org

The Diocese of Pueblo (Latin: Dioecesis Pueblensis) is a diocese of the Catholic Church in southern Colorado in the United States. Created in 1941, it is a suffragan diocese of the Archdiocese of Denver. The Cathedral of the Sacred Heart in Pueblo is the seat of the diocese.

== History ==
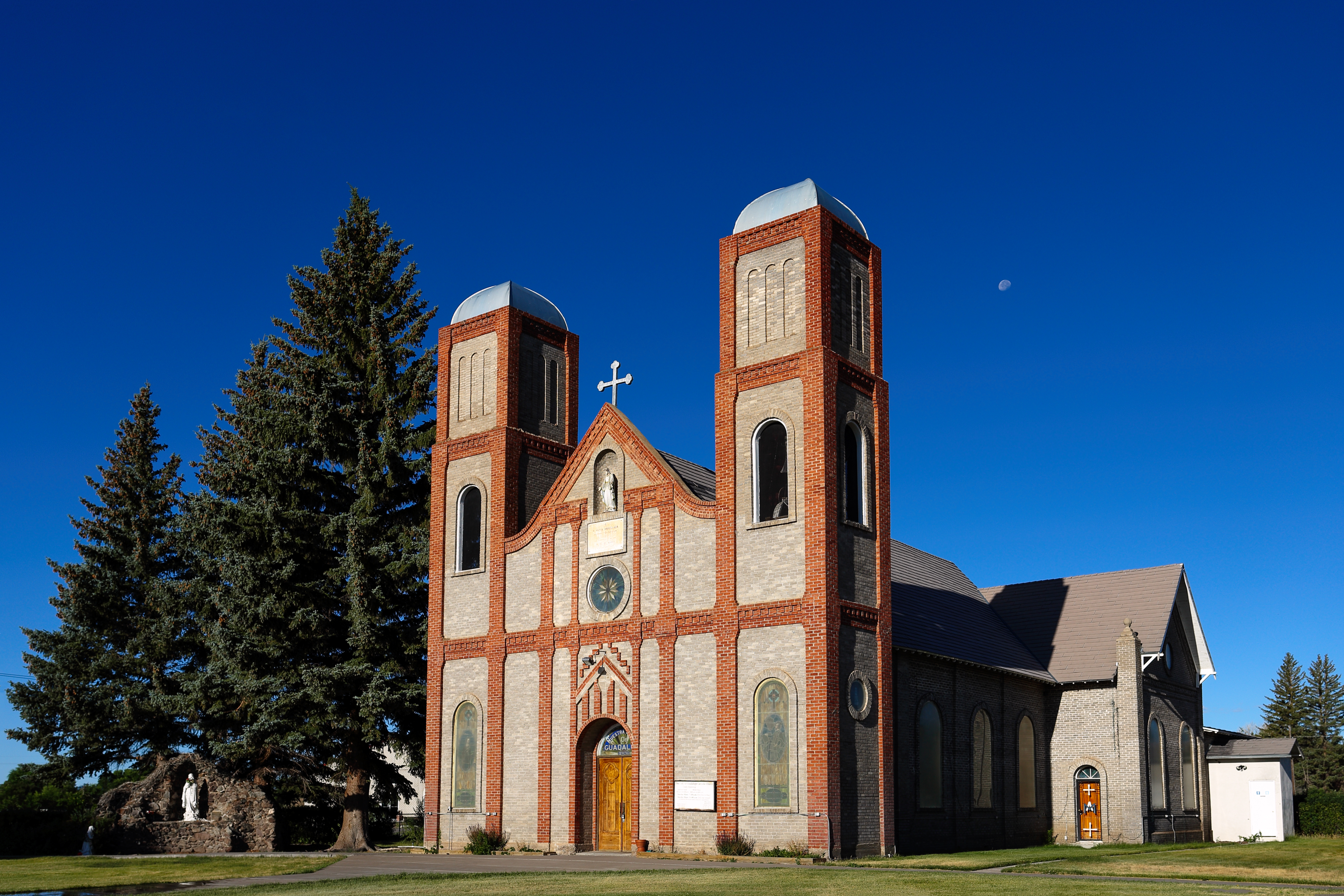
Our Lady of Guadalupe Church, Conejos, Colorado (2016)

=== 1800 to 1940 ===
Until the Mexican-American War (1846 to 1849), the Southern Colorado area was controlled by Mexico, with the few Catholics in the area under the jurisdiction of the Archdiocese of Durango. After the war, the United States assumed control of the region. In 1851, Pope Pius IX created the Apostolic Vicariate of New Mexico, including Colorado. The Vatican converted the vicariate into the Diocese of Santa Fe in 1853.

The first church in the Pueblo area was the Our Lady of Guadalupe Catholic Church, constructed in 1858 in Conejos by colonists from New Mexico. In 1868, Pope Pius IX removed territory from the Diocese of Santa Fe and the Diocese of Grass Valley to form the Vicariate Apostolic of Colorado and Utah. In 1870, the pope erected the Vicariate Apostolic of Colorado, covering only the state of Colorado.St. Mary's Hospital was founded in 1882 in Pueblo when the Sisters of Charlity converted a two-story boarding house to a medical facility. Today it is CommonSpirit - St. Mary-Corwin Hospital.

In 1884, St. Joseph was founded as a mission church in Grand Junction, the first in that city. On August 16, 1887, Pope Leo XIII converted the vicariate into the Diocese of Denver.The Sisters of Charity of Leavenworth in 1896 founded St. Mary's Hospital in Grand Junction. It is today St. Mary's Regional Hospital. In 1898, St. Ignatius was founded as a mission church in Durango, serving Native American Catholics.The first Catholic church in Alamosa was Sacred Heart, dedicated in 1928.

=== 1940 to present ===
On November 15, 1941, Pope Pius XII separated territory from the Archdiocese of Denver to form the Diocese of Pueblo. He appointed Joseph Willging from the Diocese of Helena as the first bishop of Pueblo. During his 17-year-long tenure, Willging oversaw an increase in the number of parishes from 39 to 60, and the number of priests from 84 to 151. He encouraged the establishment of parochial schools and Catholic hospitals.

In 1944, Willging founded Catholic Social Service Inc. in the diocese. Today it is Catholic Charities Diocese of Pueblo. The last crusad tax, referring to the tax levied by the Vatican taken to fund the Crusades during the Middle Ages, was abolished by the Diocese of Pueblo in 1945. Willging died in 1959 after 17 years as bishop.

Pope John XXIII appointed Charles Buswell of the Diocese of Oklahoma City-Tulsa in 1959 as the second bishop of Pueblo. Buswell resigned as bishop of Pueblo in 1979. He was replaced by Arthur Tafoya of the Archdiocese of Santa Fe in 1980 by Pope John Paul II. In 1983, John Paul II removed several counties from the Diocese of Pueblo to form the Diocese of Colorado Springs.

In 2006, the Costilla County Sheriffʼs Office began an investigation of the desecration of the All Saints Chapel and the Shrine of the Mexican Martyrs in San Luis. Pictures found on social media showed four male missionaries of the Church of Latter Day Saints (LDS) engaged in disrespectful conduct at the shrine, including holding the head of a statue. LDS Church elders apologized to the diocese and said the men had been disciplined. Tafoya said that he had forgiven the missionaries asked the Sheriff's Office not to press charges against them.

After 29 years as bishop, Tafoya retired as bishop of Pueblo in 2009. In 2009, the diocese had nearly 100,000 registered Catholics, about 16% of the population. That same year, Fernando Isern of the Archdiocese of Miami was appointed the fourth bishop of Pueblo by Pope Benedict XVI.

After Isern retired in 2013, Pope Francis named Stephen Berg of the Diocese of Fort Worth to replace him. As of 2026, Berg is the current bishop of Pueblo.

=== Reports of sex abuse ===
Lucas Antonio Galvan, a diocesan priest, pleaded guilty in 1989 to sexually fondling an 11-year-old girl; he was sentenced to a one to two year suspended sentence. After finishing his sentence, the priest moved to Mexico, where he was allowed to serve in several parishes. The diocese paid the victim a $90,000 settlement.

In 1990, William Groves, a priest as St. Ignatius Catholic Church in Ignacio, pleaded guilty to assaulting a 14-year-old in September 1989. Groves received four years probation and sex abuse treatment.

In October 2006, the diocese paid a $4 million settlement to 23 male victims of William Mueller, a Marianist band director at Roncalli High School in Pueblo between 1966 and 1971. John Yengich sued the diocese for $1 million in 2009, claiming that he had been sexually abused by Daniel Maio from 1968 to 1969. A second man accused Maio of sexual abuse in April 2010. The diocese settled the Yengich lawsuit in March 2011.

In October 2019, an investigation by Colorado Attorney General Phil Weiser revealed that 43 Catholic clergy were credibly accused of sexually abusing at least 166 children throughout Colorado since 1950. At least 36 of these children were molested by 19 clergy serving in the Diocese of Pueblo. In October 2020, it was revealed that all three of Colorado's Catholic dioceses, including the Diocese of Pueblo, had paid a total of $6.6 million in compensation to 81 victims of clergy sex abuse within the past year. In December 2020, Weiser's final report revealed that there were an additional nine credibly accused clergy and 46 alleged victims in both the Diocese of Pueblo and the Archdiocese of Denver.

== Bishops ==
=== Bishops of Pueblo ===
- Joseph Clement Willging (1941 – 1959)
- Charles Albert Buswell (1959 – 1979)
- Arthur Nicholas Tafoya (1980 – 2009)
- Fernando Isern (2009 – 2013)
- Stephen Jay Berg (2014 – present)

=== Other diocesan priest who became a bishop ===
- David Laurin Ricken, appointed Coadjutor Bishop and Bishop of Cheyenne, later Bishop of Green Bay

== Education ==
As of 2026, the Diocese of Pueblo has four schools:

- Holy Family Catholic School – Grand Junction, pre-K to grade 8
- St. Columba Catholic School – Durango, pre-K to grade 8
- St. Therese Catholic School – Pueblo, pre-K to grade 8
- St. John Neumann Catholic School – Pueblo, pre-K to grade 8

Pueblo Catholic High School closed in 1971.

Coat of arms of Diocese of Pueblo
Notes Arms was designed and adopted when the diocese was erected Adopted 1941 Escutcheon The shield contains a crenelated wall with curving lines below the wall. The Sacred Heart of Jesus is flanked on each side by a rose above the wall Symbolism The crenelated wall symbolizes old Fort Pueblo and the curving lines represent the Arkansas River. The Sacred Heart of Jesus represents the Sacred Heart Cathedral in Pueblo. The rose on the left represents Mary, mother of Jesus, under the title of "Mystical Rose." The rose on the right represents Therese of Lisieux, principal patroness of the diocese.
