= Champagnat Catholic School =

Coordinates: 25.7795435°N 80.2386604°W

Location
- 1851 Palm Avenue; Hialeah, Florida 33010; United States

Information
- Motto: Ad Jesum per Mariam (To Jesus through Mary)
- Denomination: Catholic
- Patron saint: Marcellin Champagnat
- Established: 1968; 58 years ago
- Founders: Dr. Reinaldo Alonso; Mrs. Maria I. Alonso
- Closed: 2022; 4 years ago
- CEEB code: 101081
- President: Dr. Reinaldo Alonso
- Director: Isabel C Alonso
- Principal: Nuria Alloza-Sanchez
- Teaching staff: 16.0 (FTE) (in 2007-08)
- Grades: 6-12
- Enrollment: 225 (in 2007-08)
- Student to teacher ratio: 18 (in 2007-08)
- Colors: Navy, red, and white
- Slogan: BE BOLD
- Mascot: Lion
- Newspaper: Paw Prints
- Yearbook: Reminiscence
- Website: champagnatcatholicschool.com

Champagnat Catholic School was a private Catholic school with a campus in Hialeah, Florida, United States. Established in 1968, the school served students in sixth through twelfth grades. The school closed sometime around June 27, 2022, as announced by the Miami Herald.

== History ==
Champagnat Catholic School was founded by Dr. Reinaldo and Mrs. Maria I. Alonso at a time in the history of Miami when there was a need to serve immigrant families moving to Miami. Champagnat came in to strengthen the religious, the civic and patriotic roots of children coming in from Cuba and Central and South America.

Champagnat Catholic School started under the auspices of the Marist Brothers due to Dr. Alonso's previous years as principal of the Champagnat elementary in La Vibora, Cuba and later on the Champagnat high school in Cienfuegos, Cuba. The first Champagnat Catholic School opened its classroom doors on September 8, 1968, at the corner of 29th Avenue and 7th Street SW in Miami with 123 students. In 1973 the school opened the doors to a second campus in Hialeah.

The school was accredited by the National Independent Private Schools Association (NIPSA), National Council of Private Schools Association (NCPSA), Council of Bilingual Schools (COBIS).

There are also some other educative schools called "Champagnat". One of the biggest is based in Buenos Aires, Argentina.

== Campus ==
Champagnat Catholic School had a campus in Hialeah at 1851 Palm Avenue serving sixth through twelfth grades.

== Curriculum ==
Curriculum followed Florida State Standards with an emphasis on preparing for entry to universities/colleges. Students were required to take English Language Arts, Literature, Mathematics, Science, Social Studies, Foreign Language and PE each school year. Electives included Intro to Business Management, Marketing Essentials, Hospitality and Tourism, Forensic Science, Sports and Entertainment Management, and World Religions. In order to enhance the educational experience all high school students were on a 1:1 iPad digital curriculum and had access to virtual courses via FLVS.

== Extracurricular activities ==
Student Council, Athletics

== Notable alumni ==
- Jurrangelo Cijntje, baseball player
- Luis Exposito, former MLB player for the Baltimore Orioles
- Fernando Isern, current bishop of the Diocese of Pueblo
- Jesus Machado, college football linebacker for the Rice Owls
- Alex Penelas, Mayor of Miami-Dade County, Florida 1996-2004
- Gregory Rousseau, current NFL player for the Buffalo Bills
