= Cathedral of the Sacred Heart (Pueblo, Colorado) =

Historic church in Colorado, United States

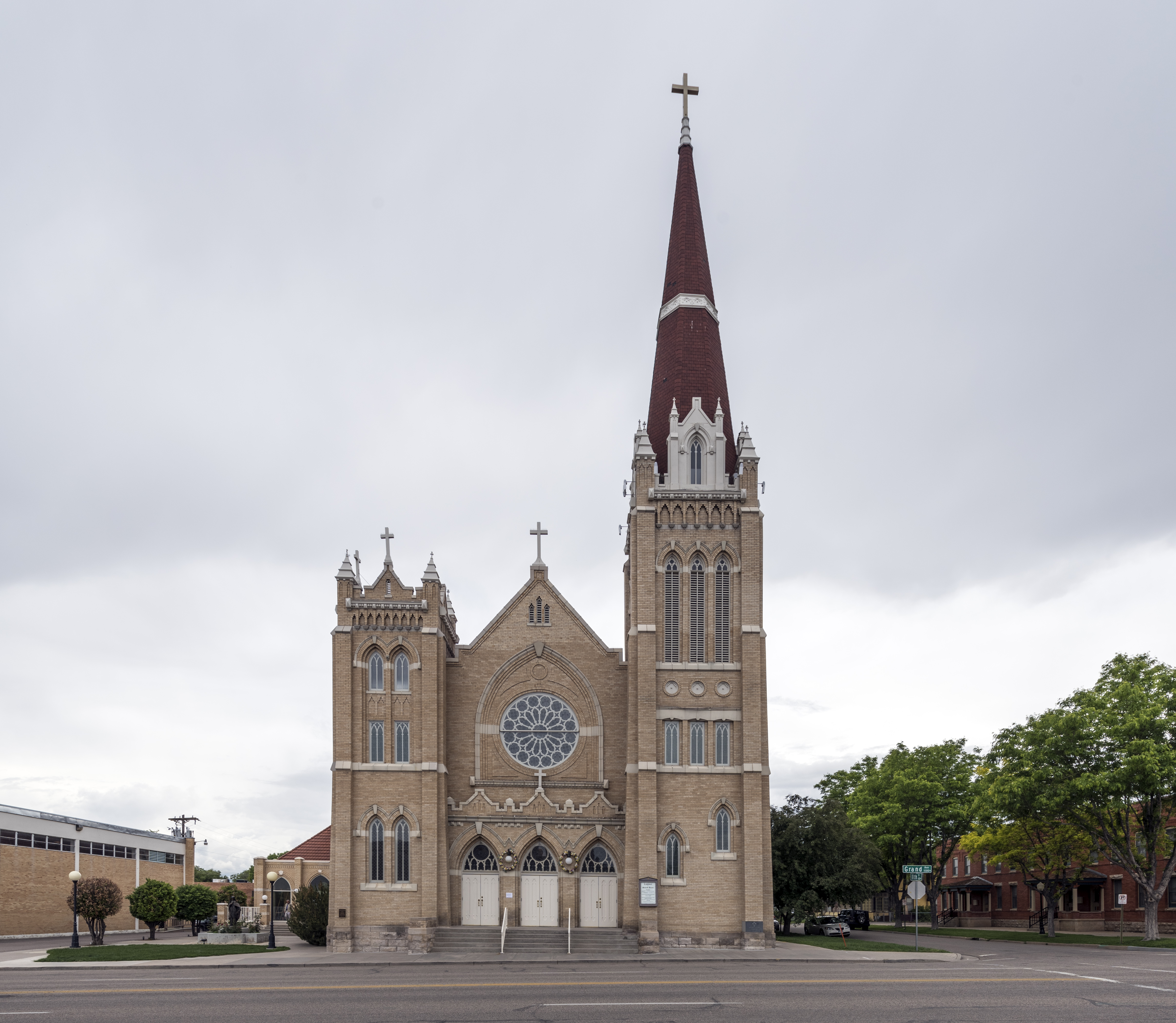

- Location within Colorado
- 38°16′37.2″N 104°36′43.92″W
- Location: 414 West 11th Street; Pueblo, Colorado
- Country: United States
- Denomination: Roman Catholic Church
- Website: www.cathedralofthesacredheart-pueblo.com

History
- Status: Cathedral/Parish
- Founded: 1873 (parish)
- Dedication: Sacred Heart of Jesus
- Dedicated: April 10, 1913

Architecture
- Functional status: Active
- Architect(s): Willison & Fallis
- Style: Late Gothic Revival
- Years built: 1912-1913

Administration
- Diocese: Pueblo

Clergy
- Bishop: Most Rev. Stephen Berg
- Rector: Msgr. James Koenigsfeld
- Sacred Heart Church
- U.S. National Register of Historic Places
- Area: less than one acre
- Built: 1912–13
- Built by: Jacob M. Gile, J.E. Tully
- Architect: Willison & Fallis
- Architectural style: Late Gothic Revival
- NRHP reference No.: 89000037
- Added to NRHP: February 21, 1989

The Cathedral of the Sacred Heart or Sacred Heart Church is a historic church located at 414 West 11th Street in Pueblo, Colorado. It is the mother church of the Diocese of Pueblo.

Its building, built in 1912–13, was listed on the National Register of Historic Places in 1989. It was deemed "an outstanding example of Gothic Revival architecture, includes an inspiring spire, pointed arch windows, and soaring interior vaulting".

== History ==
In October 1860, Fr. Projectus Machebeuf, and Fr. J.B. Raverdy began the 300-mile journey from Santa Fe, New Mexico, north into Colorado Territory. Months later they arrived at the Arkansas River, at the present site of the city of Pueblo. Initially, the priests celebrated mass in the homes of local Catholics, then they began to hold public services in the old Courthouse on 3rd and Santa Fe Avenue, until finally a proper church was established on 13th and West Streets. In 1873 it was the first parish in Pueblo, and it was called St. Ignatius.

A fire destroyed St. Ignatius and its rectory in 1882. Under the direction of the Jesuit priests assigned to serve it, money was raised and second church was built. This time St. Ignatius was situated near the heart of the city, on Grand between 10th and 11th Streets.

Eventually, it served as the parish hall when the present church was built under the pastorate of Msgr. Thomas Wolohan. In 1910, Msgr. Wolohan began planning for a new church to be dedicated to the Sacred Heart of Jesus. On May 5, 1912, the church cornerstone was laid, and within a year, Sacred Heart was dedicated by the Most Reverend Nicholas Matz, Archbishop of Denver.

The construction costs of the church were $48,000 and was realized with the help of the congregation of 190 families. Msgr. Wolohan served as pastor of Sacred Heart for thirty-six years. He is buried in a crypt in the cathedral.

On November 15, 1941, Sacred Heart was designated as the Cathedral of the newly established Diocese of Pueblo. Since its designation as a Cathedral, the church has been served by eight rectors and administrators. In subsequent years, the parish grew from approximately 930 families to more than 1,200. as the Cathedral church of the Bishop of Pueblo, Sacred Heart has also served as a centre for liturgical and pastoral ministry within diocese.

In 1997, the Cathedral celebrated its 125th anniversary with a year-long series of events. It adopted as its motto that year, Strong at Heart after 125 years.

In 1989, the cathedral was added to the National Register of Historic Places by the U.S. Department of the Interior.

In 2008, the steeple of the cathedral was struck by lightning and was engulfed by flames and was damaged. Work has been completed to replace the steeple and install a lightning rod. The work was done by HW Houston Construction and Vision Mechanical, and a new cross was dedicated. The Bishop of Pueblo was then Stephen Berg.

== See also ==
- List of Catholic cathedrals in the United States
- List of cathedrals in the United States
