= Arthur Tafoya =

American Catholic bishop (1933–2018)

His Excellency, The Most Reverend Arthur Nicholas Tafoya
- Bishop of Pueblo
- Diocese: Diocese of Pueblo
- Appointed: July 1, 1980
- Installed: September 10, 1980
- Term ended: October 15, 2009
- Predecessor: Charles Albert Buswell
- Successor: Fernando Isern

Orders
- Ordination: May 12, 1962 by Edwin Byrne
- Consecration: September 10, 1980 by James Vincent Casey, Robert Fortune Sanchez, and Charles Albert Buswell

Personal details
- Born: March 2, 1933 Alameda, New Mexico, U.S.
- Died: March 24, 2018 (aged 85) Albuquerque, New Mexico, U.S.
- Motto: Servant, shepherd

Styles of Arthur Nicholas Tafoya
- Reference style: His Excellency; The Most Reverend
- Spoken style: Your Excellency
- Religious style: Bishop

Arthur Nicholas Tafoya (March 2, 1933 – March 24, 2018) was an American prelate of the Roman Catholic Church. He served as the third bishop of the Diocese of Pueblo in Colorado from 1980 to 2009. His resignation as bishop was accepted by Pope Benedict XVI on October 15, 2009.

== Biography ==
Arthur Tafoya was born on March 2, 1933, in Alameda, New Mexico. He was ordained to the priesthood in Saint Francis Cathedral in Santa Fe, New Mexico, by Archbishop Edwin Byrne for the Archdiocese of Santa Fe on May 12, 1962.

=== Bishop of Pueblo ===
On July 1, 1980, Tafoya was appointed the third bishop of Pueblo by Pope John Paul II. He received his episcopal consecration at the Massari Arena in Pueblo, Colorado, on September 10, 1980, from Archbishop James Casey, with Archbishop Robert Sanchez and Bishop Charles Buswell serving as co-consecrators.

Tafoya was an early critic of the 2003 to 2011 Iraq War, calling it "an unjust war...[that] sets a dangerous precedent and threatens the lives and well-being of people in our nation and world." During the 2004 U.S. presidential election, he expressed his opposition to denying communion to Catholic politicians who support abortion rights for women, saying that it was not the only issue voters should consider.

=== Retirement ===
When Tafoya reached the mandatory retirement age of 75 for bishops, he submitted his letter of resignation as bishop of Pueblo to Pope Benedict XVI. The pope accepted his resignation on October 15, 2009.

Arthur Tafoya died in Albuquerque, New Mexico, on March 24, 2018, at age 85.

== See also ==
- Catholic Church hierarchy
- Catholic Church in the United States
- Historical list of the Catholic bishops of the United States
- List of Catholic bishops of the United States
- Lists of patriarchs, archbishops, and bishops

== Episcopal succession ==
Catholic Church titles
Preceded by Charles Albert Buswell	Bishop of Pueblo; 1980–2009	Succeeded by Fernando Isern
