= Fernando Isern =

Cuban-born prelate

His Excellency, The Most Reverend Fernando Isern
- Bishop Emeritus of Pueblo
- Diocese: Diocese of Pueblo
- Appointed: October 15, 2009
- Installed: December 10, 2009
- Retired: June 13, 2013
- Predecessor: Arthur Nicholas Tafoya
- Successor: Stephen Jay Berg

Orders
- Ordination: April 16, 1993
- Consecration: December 10, 2009 by Charles J. Chaput, John Favalora, and Arthur Tafoya

Personal details
- Born: September 22, 1958 (age 67) Havana, Cuba
- Education: Miami Dade College; Florida International University; Saint John Vianney Seminary (Miami); St. Vincent de Paul Regional Seminary
- Motto: Caritas Christi urget nos (The love of Christ inspires us)

Styles of Fernando Isern
- Reference style: His Excellency; The Most Reverend
- Spoken style: Your Excellency
- Religious style: Bishop

Fernando Isern (born September 22, 1958) is a Cuban-born prelate of the Roman Catholic Church. Formerly a pastor and high school president in the Archdiocese of Miami, he served as bishop of the Diocese of Pueblo in Colorado from 2009 to 2013.

== Biography ==
=== Early life and education ===
Fernando Isern was born on September 22, 1958, in Havana, Cuba. In 1963, his family moved to Venezuela and then in 1967 to Miami, Florida. Isern graduated from Champagnat Catholic School in Hialeah, Florida, in 1977. After high school, he attended Miami Dade College and then Florida International University, both in Miami, where he graduated in 1982 with a Bachelor of Arts degree in business administration. After graduation, Isern got a job in marketing with First National Bank of Miami, promoting the introduction of ATM machines in Florida.

While working at First National, Isern started seriously considering the priesthood. He began spending time at St. John Vianney College Seminary in Miami, eventually enrolling there. He also studied at St. Vincent de Paul Regional Seminary in Boynton Beach, Florida.

=== Ordination and Ministry ===
Isern was ordained to the priesthood for the Archdiocese of Miami on April 16, 1993. He then served as a parochial vicar at St. Mark Parish in Southwest Ranches, Florida. In 1996, Isern was transferred to St. Elizabeth of Hungary Parish in Pompano Beach, Florida.

In 1999, Isern became an adjunct professor at St. Vincent de Paul and assistant chaplain for the archdiocesan Youth Center and for Encuentros Juveniles. He was also appointed as parochial vicar at St. Agnes Parish in Key Biscayne, Florida. In 2002, Isern was sent to Our Lady of Lourdes Parish in Miami as parochial vicar. In 2003, he was appointed pastor of that parish. From 2008 to 2009, Isern also served as president of Archbishop Coleman F. Carroll High School in Miami. He is affiliated with the Schoenstatt Movement.

=== Bishop of Pueblo, Colorado ===
On October 15, 2009, Isern was appointed the fourth bishop of Pueblo by Pope Benedict XVI. Isern received his episcopal consecration on December 10, 2009, at an arena at Colorado State University-Pueblo. His principal consecrator was Archbishop Charles J. Chaput; the principal co-consecrators were Archbishop John C. Favalora and Bishop Arthur N. Tafoya. Isern was the 11th priest from the Archdiocese of Miami to become a bishop. As bishop, Isern instituted perpetual adoration at the Shrine of Saint Therese in Pueblo.

=== Retirement ===
On June 13, 2013, Pope Francis accepted Isern's resignation due to poor health as bishop of Pueblo.

== See also ==
- Catholic Church hierarchy
- Catholic Church in the United States
- Historical list of the Catholic bishops of the United States
- List of Catholic bishops of the United States
- Lists of patriarchs, archbishops, and bishops

Catholic Church titles
Preceded by -	Bishop Emeritus of Pueblo; 2013-Present	Succeeded by -
Preceded by Arthur Nicholas Tafoya	Bishop of Pueblo; 2009-2013	Succeeded by Stephen Jay Berg
