= Jacob M. Gile =

American architect (1849–1937)

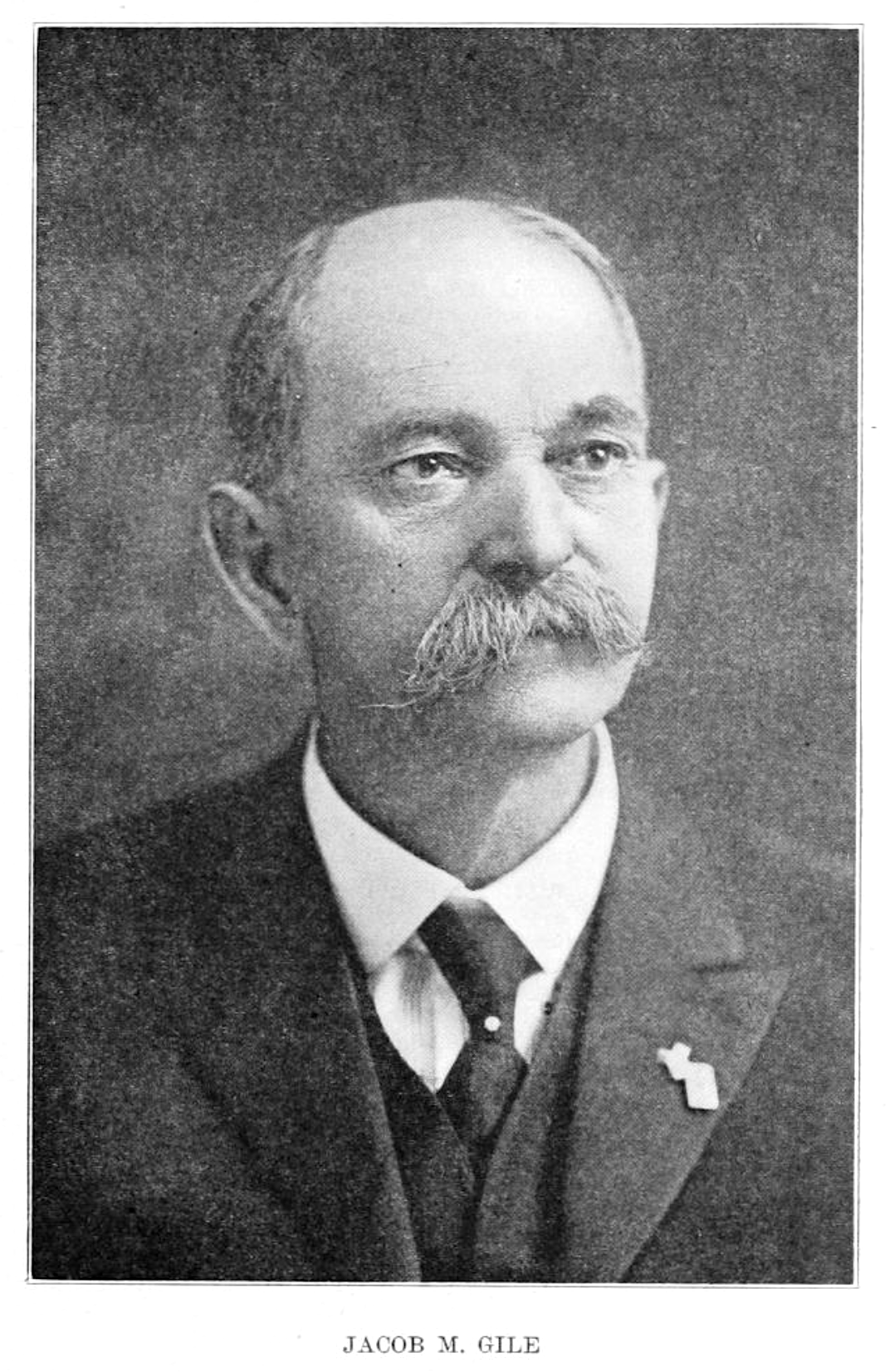
- Born: March 18, 1849; Lebanon, Indiana, U.S.
- Died: December 28, 1937 (aged 88); Pueblo, Colorado, U.S.
- Other names: J.M. Gile
- Occupation: Architect
- Years active: 1900–1932

Jacob M. Gile (1849 – 1937), was an American architect and building contractor in Colorado. He worked primarily in Pueblo, Colorado, and was active from 1900 to 1932.

== Biography ==
Gile was born on March 18, 1849, in Lebanon, Boone County, Indiana. When he was a young child the family moved to Benton County, Iowa, where they lived until around 1867. Sometime after the death of his father, Gile moved to Maryville, Missouri where he learned the carpenter trade and became a building contractor. In 1890, he moved to Denver, Colorado.

Gile moved to Pueblo, Colorado in 1900, when he was hired to design and supervise the building construction of the Minnequa Hospital (1902). He also supervised construction of the International Order of Foresters Home for Indigents in Cañon City, Colorado. Its architect has not been documented but the design is considered characteristic of Gile's work." He worked with Pueblo architect John F. Bishop from 1902 to 1903, but worked alone for most of his career. Gile also worked with architects Robert Willison and Montana Fallis on the Vail Hotel (1910), and the Cathedral of the Sacred Heart (1912). Both buildings are located in Pueblo, Colorado and are listed on the National Register.

He died at the age of 89 on December 28, 1937, in Pueblo, Colorado.

== List of works ==
- Temple Emanuel (1900), 1325 North Grand Ave., Pueblo, Colorado; NRHP-listed
- Minnequa Hospital (1902), Pueblo, Colorado; part of St. Mary-Corwin Medical Center
- Edison School (1909), 900 East Mesa, Pueblo, Colorado
- Vail Hotel (1910), 217 South Grand Ave., Pueblo, Colorado; with Robert Willison and Montana FaIlis; NRHP-listed
- Cathedral of the Sacred Heart (1912), 1025 North Grand Ave., Pueblo, Colorado; with Robert Willison and Montana FaIlis; NRHP-listed
- Simon House, 2304 North Grand Ave., Pueblo, Colorado
- International Order of Foresters Home for Indigents, Cañon City, Colorado; as supervisor
