= Paulin Ladeuze =

- Titular Bishop of Tiberias
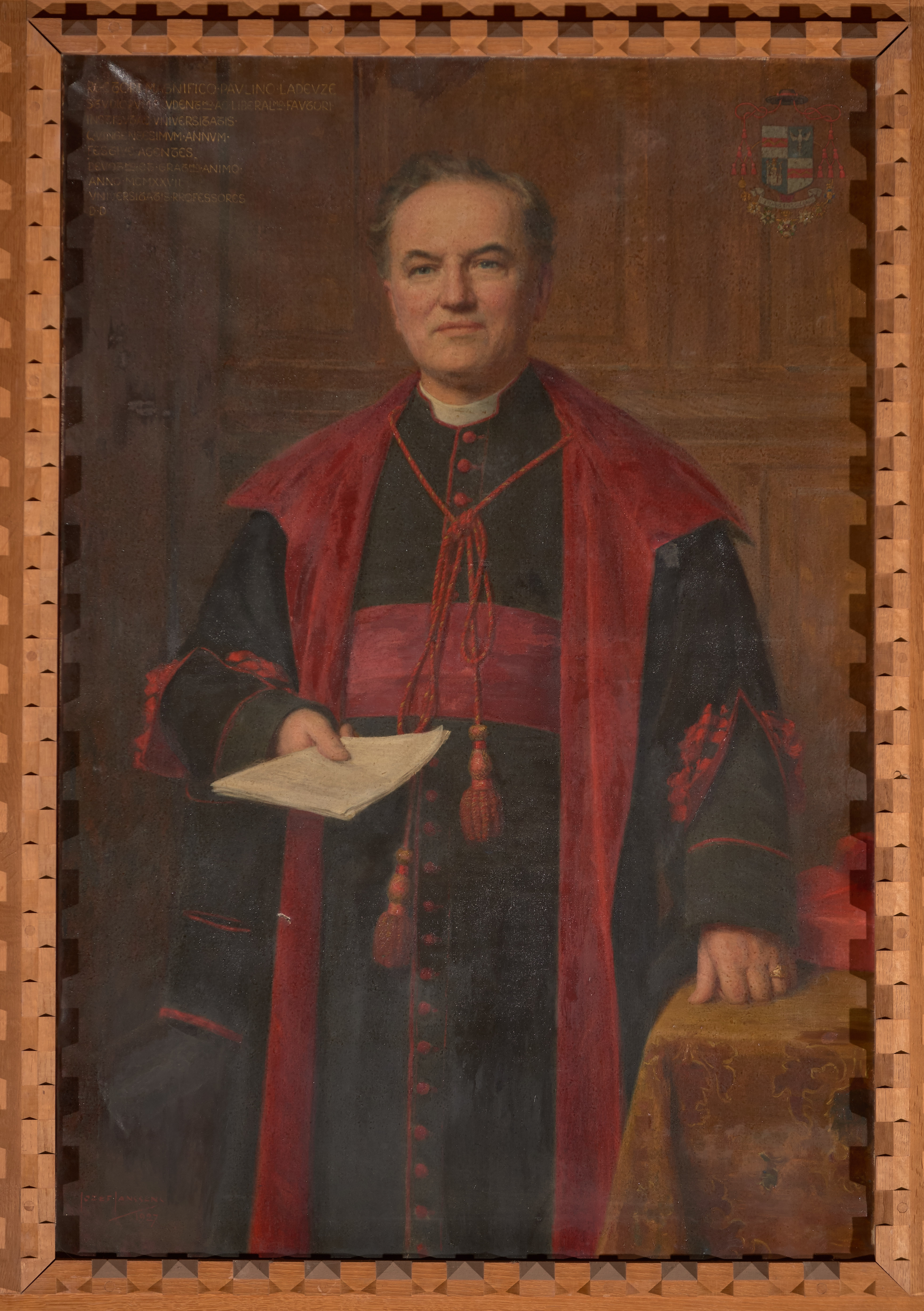
- Church: Catholic Church
- Diocese: Diocese of Tiberias
- In office: 21 October 1928 – 10 February 1940
- Predecessor: Giacomo Sinibaldi
- Successor: Egidio Luigi Lanzo

Orders
- Ordination: 17 December 1892
- Consecration: 2 February 1929 by Jozef-Ernest van Roey

Personal details
- Born: 3 July 1870 Harveng, Belgium
- Died: 10 February 1940 (aged 69) Louvain, Belgium

Paulin Ladeuze (French pronunciation: [polɛ̃ ladøz]; 1870–1940) was a Belgian bishop and theologian.

== Biography ==
Paulin Ladeuze was born in Harveng, Belgium on 3 July 1870. He was educated at the Catholic University of Leuven, where he earned his doctorate in 1898, became professor in the same year and became rector in 1909, serving until his death.

He was a contributor to the Catholic Encyclopedia.

He died in Louvain, near Brussels, on 10 February 1940.
