= Boone Santa Fe Railroad Depot =

- U.S. National Register of Historic Places
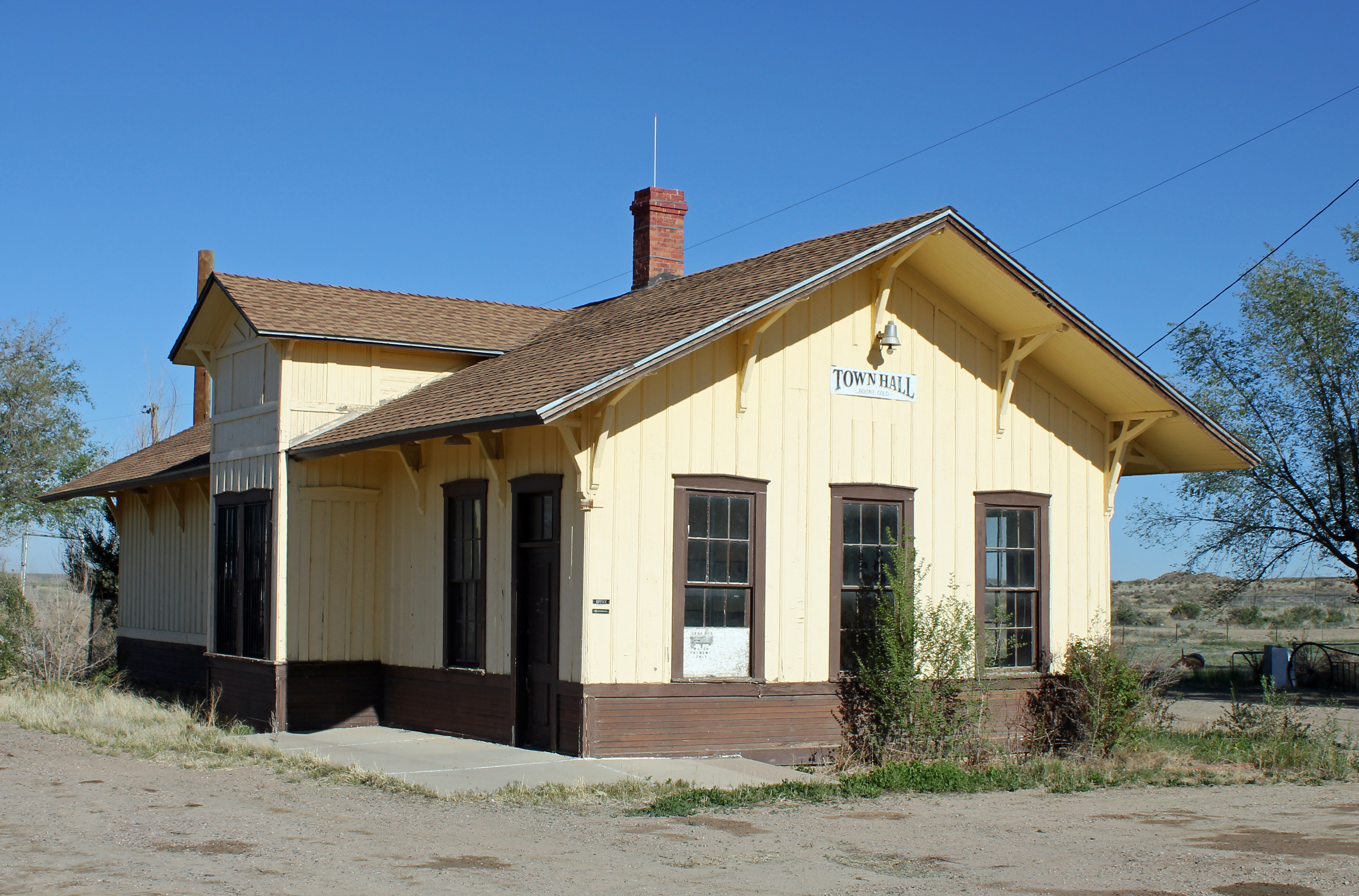
- Depot building in 2012

- Location within Colorado
- Location: 100 Baker Ave., Boone, Colorado
- Coordinates: 38°14′55″N 104°15′23″W
- Area: less than 1 acre (0.40 ha)
- NRHP reference No.: 97000618
- Added to NRHP: June 27, 1997

The Boone Santa Fe Railroad Depot, at 100 Baker Ave. in Boone, Colorado, was listed on the National Register of Historic Places in 1997.

It has also been known as Boone Town Hall as the city offices were moved there in 1996 upon damage to its main town hall building.

It is a railway station and shipping point for the Atchison, Topeka and Santa Fe Railway's main line running through southern Colorado.

It was deemed significant as representing "the impact that railroads had on a town's growth and development" and for its architectural significance: "This well-preserved building is one of the few surviving wood frame combination depots still at its original location. The Boone Depot was one of two otherwise standard structures [of the Santa Fe Railway in Southern Colorado] known to have an enlarged operator's bay."

== See also ==
- National Register of Historic Places listings in Pueblo County, Colorado
