= Jesus Machado =

American football player (born 2001)

No. 99 – Rice Owls
- Position: Linebacker
- Class: Graduate

Personal information
- Born: April 15, 2001 (age 25)
- Listed height: 6 ft 1 in (1.85 m)
- Listed weight: 220 lb (100 kg)

Career information
- High school: Champagnat Catholic (Hialeah, Florida)
- College: Tulane (2020–2024); Houston (2025); Rice (2026–present)

Awards and highlights
- Second-team All-AAC (2023)
- Stats at ESPN

Jesus Machado Jr. (born April 15, 2001) is an American college football linebacker for the Rice Owls. He previously played for the Houston Cougars and the Tulane Green Wave.

== Early life ==
Machado played football for much of his early life. He attended Champagnat Catholic School because the school offer classes for grades six through twelve, meaning he could play on the high school football team while he was in eighth grade. He received his first scholarship offer from the NC State Wolfpack in May 2016. All offers made prior to a player's senior season are verbal-only, but he additionally received offers from Alabama, Iowa State, Michigan, and West Virginia. His offer for Alabama came from offensive coordinator Mario Cristobal.

== College career ==
Machado chose to play for Tulane in 2020. He played in 45 games during his first four years at the school, totaling 150 tackles. In the 2023 Military Bowl, he tore his ACL. He chose not to play at all in the 2024 season because of the injury. Machado entered the transfer portal in March 2025.

Machado committed to Houston in April 2025. He appeared in two games and made five tackles prior to leaving the team in October. In December 2025, it was officially confirmed that he would enter the transfer portal.

Machado committed to Rice on January 12, 2026.
