= Temple Emanuel (Pueblo, Colorado) =

Reform synagogue in Pueblo, Colorado, US

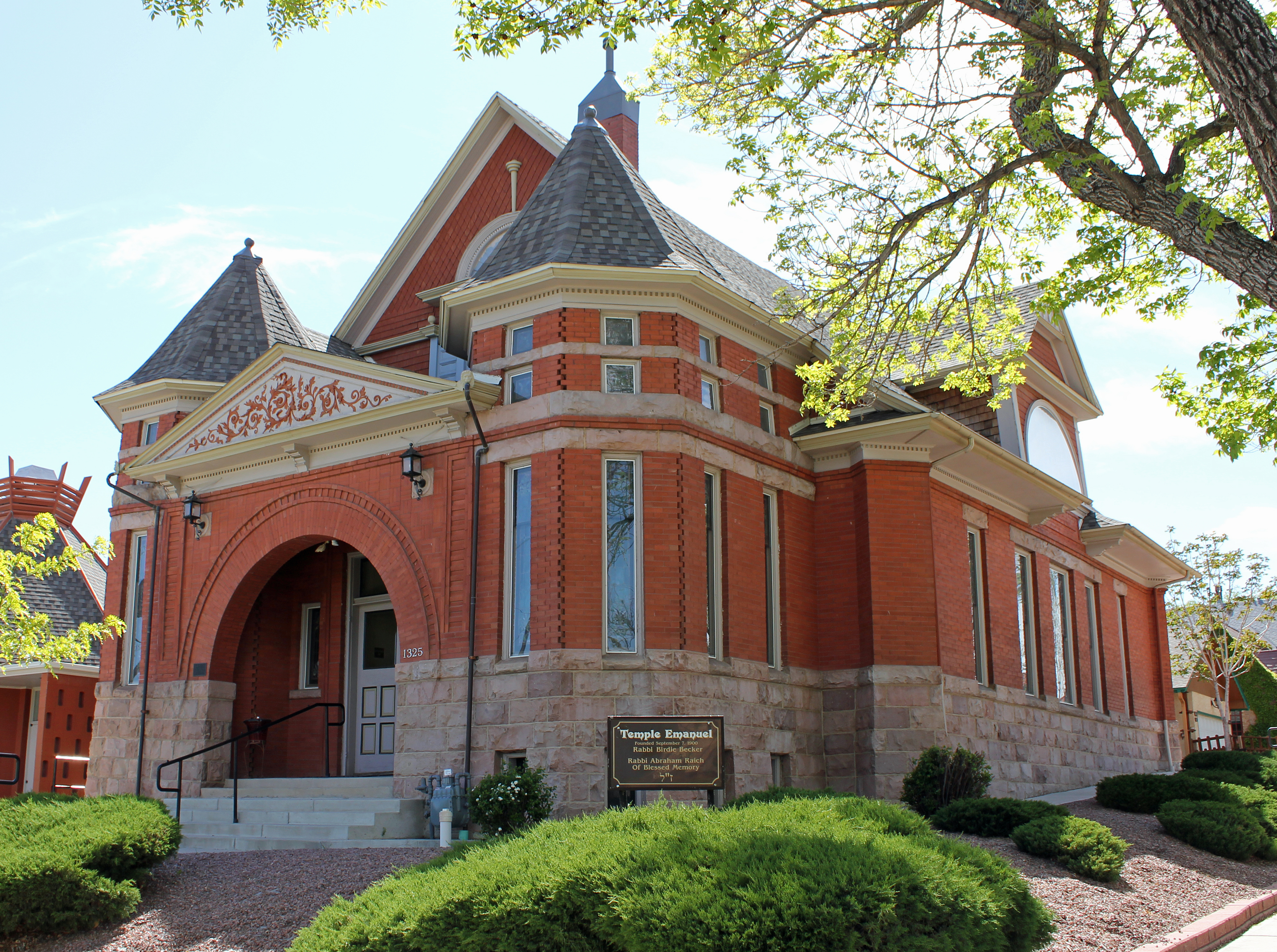
- The synagogue, in 2012

- Location in Colorado

Religion
- Affiliation: Reform Judaism
- Ecclesiastical or organizational status: Synagogue
- Leadership: Rabbi Birdie Becker (Emerita)
- Status: Active

Location
- Location: 1325 North Grand Avenue, Pueblo, Colorado 81003
- Country: United States
- Interactive map of Temple Emanuel
- Coordinates: 38°16′47″N 104°36′44″W

Architecture
- Architect: Jacob M. Gile
- Type: Synagogue architecture
- Style: Queen Anne; Neoclassical; Richardsonian Romanesque
- Established: 1898 (as a congregation)
- Completed: 1900

Specifications
- Direction of façade: East
- Materials: Brick, sandstone, asphalt

Website
- templeemanuelpueblo.net
- Temple Emanuel
- U.S. National Register of Historic Places
- Area: less than one acre
- NRHP reference No.: 96000273
- Added to NRHP: March 14, 1996

The Temple Emanuel is a Reform Jewish congregation and synagogue, located at 1325 North Grand Avenue, in Pueblo, Colorado, in the United States.

Built in 1900, the synagogue is located in one of the oldest neighborhoods in the city of Pueblo. The Temple Emanuel was listed on the National Register of Historic Places on March 14, 1996.

== History ==
In 1895, the Jewish population of Pueblo, Colorado was about forty to fifty families, which was large enough to organize the first Orthodox congregation known as B'nai Jacob. A Reform Jewish group called The Ladies Temple Association was formed three years later in 1898, which later became known as the Temple Emanuel congregation. Temple Emanuel is the city of Pueblo's oldest synagogue, however the Jewish community had existed many years prior.

The synagogue building was designed by Pueblo-based architect and builder, Jacob M. Gile; and was designed in the Queen Anne style with Neoclassical and Richardsonian Romanesque influences. The building has had limited alterations since it was finished in 1900. The masonry one-story building has a front-gabled roof, two polygonal towers, and an entry protected by a Syrian arch. In 1963, a separate temple education building was completed, and it is a brick structure in the shape of the Star of David. The education building is a non-contributing property.

== 2019 plotted attack ==
In 2019, the temple was threatened with violence by a white supremacist, who was intercepted by the FBI. Richard Holzer, aged 28 years who self-identified as a Neo-Nazi and white supremacist, pleaded guilty to intentionally attempting to obstruct persons in the enjoyment of their free exercise of religious beliefs, through force and the attempted use of explosives and fire. In February 2021 Holzer was sentenced to 19.5 years in custody.

== See also ==
- History of the Jews in Denver
- National Register of Historic Places listings in Pueblo County, Colorado
