= Butler House (Pueblo, Colorado) =

- U.S. National Register of Historic Places
- Location within Colorado
- Location: 6916 Broadacre Rd., Pueblo County, Colorado, in vic. of Avondale, Colorado, broadly near Pueblo, Colorado
- Coordinates: 38.01204°N 104.45480°W
- Area: 22.5 acres (9.1 ha)
- Built: c.1880
- NRHP reference No.: 84000880
- Added to NRHP: August 16, 1984

The Butler House in the general area of Pueblo, Colorado was built around 1880, or before. It was listed on the National Register of Historic Places in 1984. The listing included five contributing buildings and a contributing site on 22.5 acres (9.1 ha).

The main house of the Butler House ranch complex is a one-story adobe residence of about 2,800 square feet (260 m^{2}), which was built in the 1880s or before; perhaps portions of it are from the former Craig residence, built in 1864 and burned in 1879.

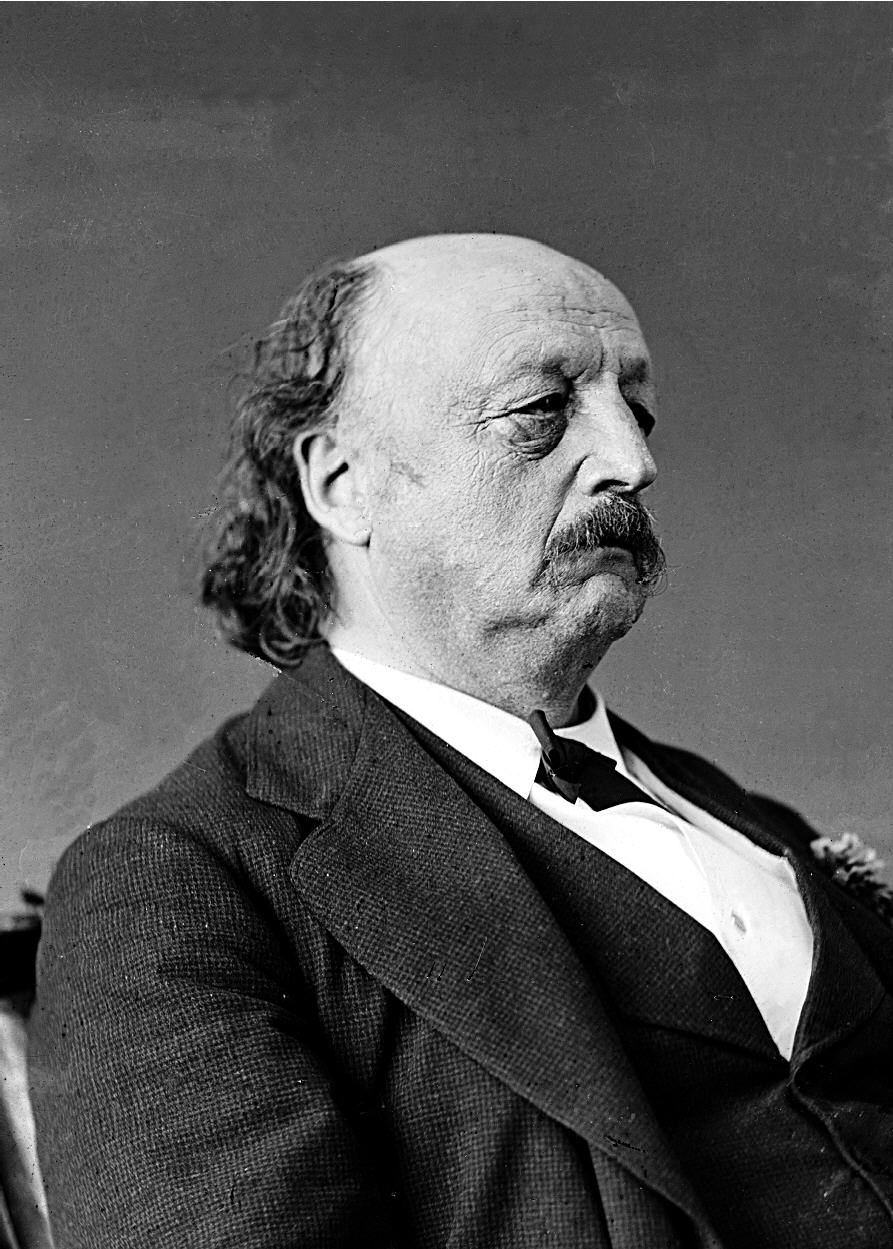
Benjamin Butler, a politician and Union Major General stymied in the Bermuda Hundred campaign

In 1882 it became the ranch of Benjamin F. Butler, "a prominent military figure and attorney from the east."

Other elements of the complex are: an agent's stone house, a stone outbuilding, a barn, and a cow shed.

It is located 26 miles southeast of Pueblo on the Huerfano River, in the plain just after the river comes out of its canyon, in the vicinity of Avondale.

In 2021, the Pueblo County Assessor identifies the owner of 6916 Broadacre as "Bar Nothing Ranches LLC", which had acquired title in 1997 from the Paul Butler Trust. The property has 640 acres (1.00 sq mi) total land area, though only 22.5 acres (9.1 ha) is NRHP-listed.

== See also ==
- National Register of Historic Places listings in Pueblo County, Colorado
