= Gast Mansion =

Historic house in Pueblo, Colorado, US

- U.S. National Register of Historic Places
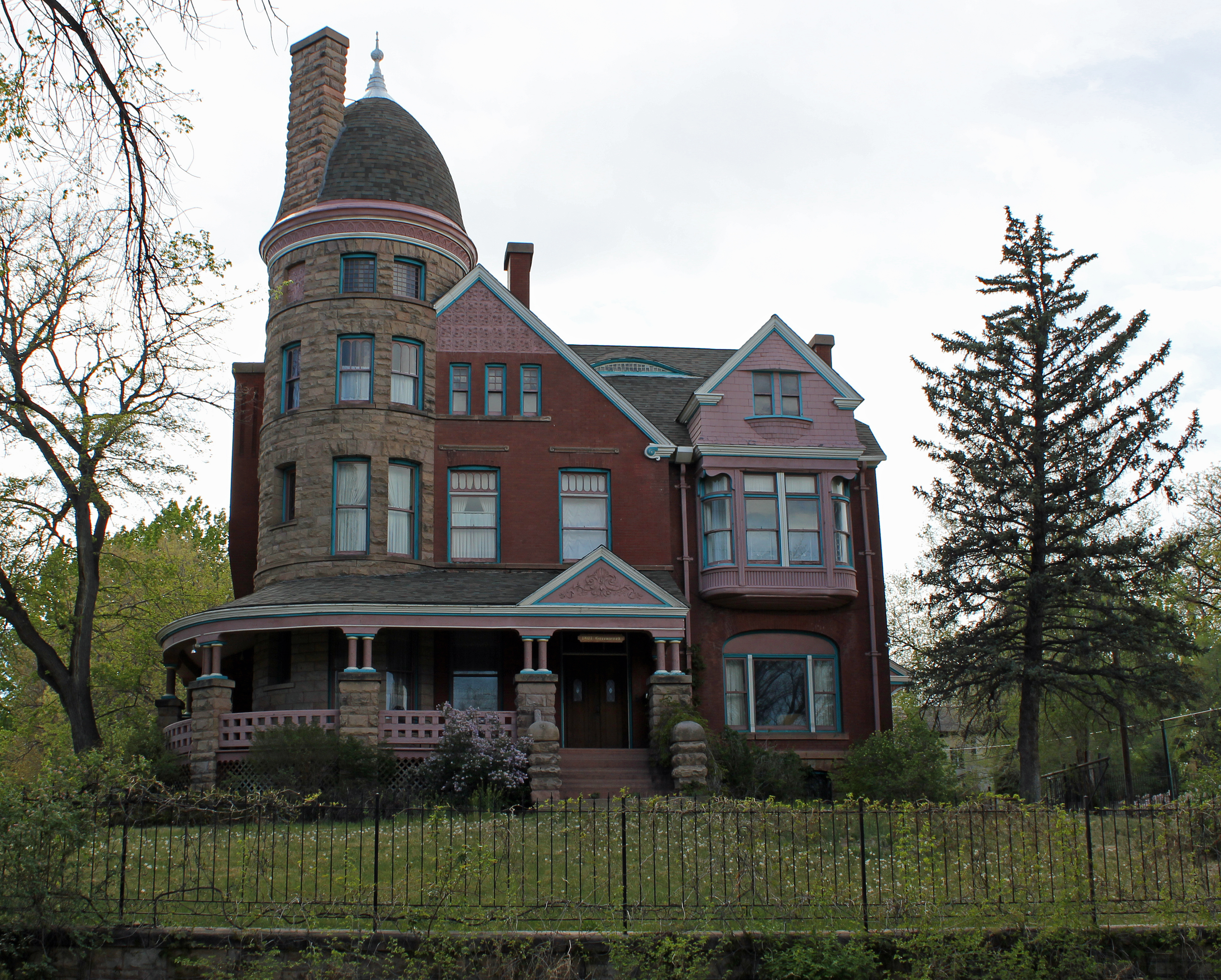

- Location within Colorado
- Location: 1801 Greenwood Street, Pueblo, Colorado, US
- Coordinates: 38°17′02″N 104°36′47″W
- Area: less than one acre
- Built: 1892
- Architectural style: Queen Anne, Romanesque
- NRHP reference No.: 82002312
- Added to NRHP: June 3, 1982

Gast Mansion is an 1892 historic house at 1801 Greenwood Street in Pueblo, Colorado. It was built for attorney Charles Edwin Gast in 1892, as a mixture of the Richardsonian Romanesque and Queen Anne styles of architecture. The Gast Mansion was lived in by the Gast family for four generations over a period of 68 years.

It is listed on the National Register of Historic Places since 1982.

== See also ==
- National Register of Historic Places listings in Pueblo County, Colorado
