= R.T. Frazier House =

House in Pueblo, Colorado, US

- U.S. National Register of Historic Places
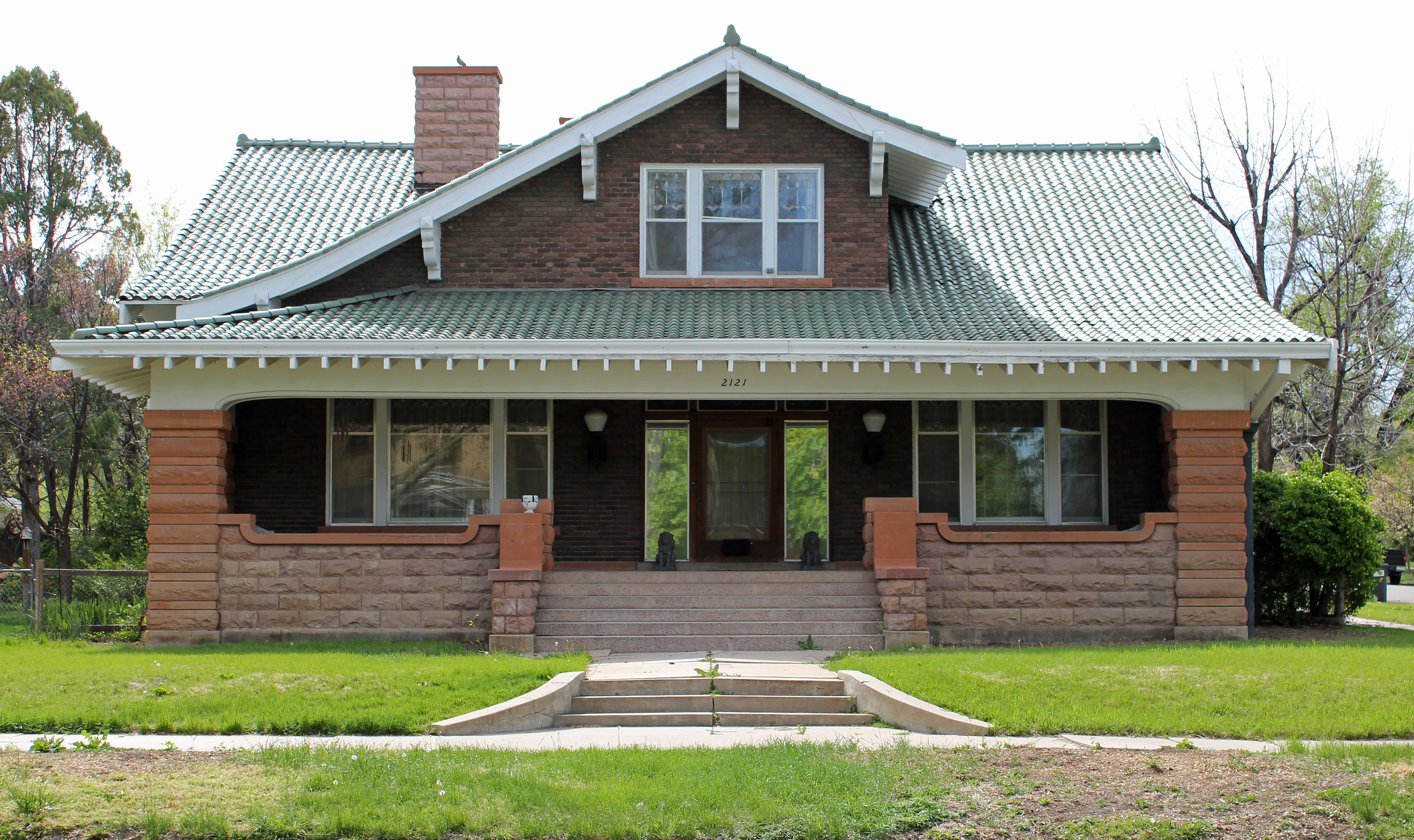
- House in 2012

- Location within Colorado
- Location: 2121 N. Elizabeth St., Pueblo, Colorado, US
- Coordinates: 38.28834°N 104.61533°W
- Area: 0.5 acres (0.20 ha)
- Built: 1915
- Built by: R. T. Frazier
- Architectural style: Bungalow, Craftsman
- NRHP reference No.: 85001329
- Added to NRHP: June 19, 1985

The R.T. Frazier House is a historic Craftsman-style bungalow house built in 1915 in Pueblo, Colorado. It was listed on the National Register of Historic Places in 1985. It was deemed significant for its association with R.T. Frazier and as an architectural work.

== History ==
It was built in 1915 for local saddle and harness manufacturer Robert T. Frazier, of R.T. Frazier Saddlery. Frazier was wealthy and spared no expense. The construction budget was US $15,000; however they spent more than double at US $35,000 (without furnishings).

Frazier's saddles won many awards, including first place at the 1893 Columbia Exposition, and was considered the finest saddle in the world at the 1915 Panama-Pacific Exposition. Two of Frazier's famous saddlery customers were Buffalo Bill Cody and Pancho Villa (José Doroteo Arango Arámbula).

Its construction of the R.T. Frazier House was announced and reviewed favorably by the Pueblo Star Journal, the local newspaper, in 1916, which called it "utter perfection". It has been speculated that the house may have been designed from the popular style of books of the time period. It is a front-gabled house with tapestry brick and rhyolite stone; the foundation appears to be made of ryolite stone with the four large pillars. The porch and the railing made of sandstone.

== See also ==
- National Register of Historic Places listings in Pueblo County, Colorado
