= Vail Hotel =

- U.S. National Register of Historic Places
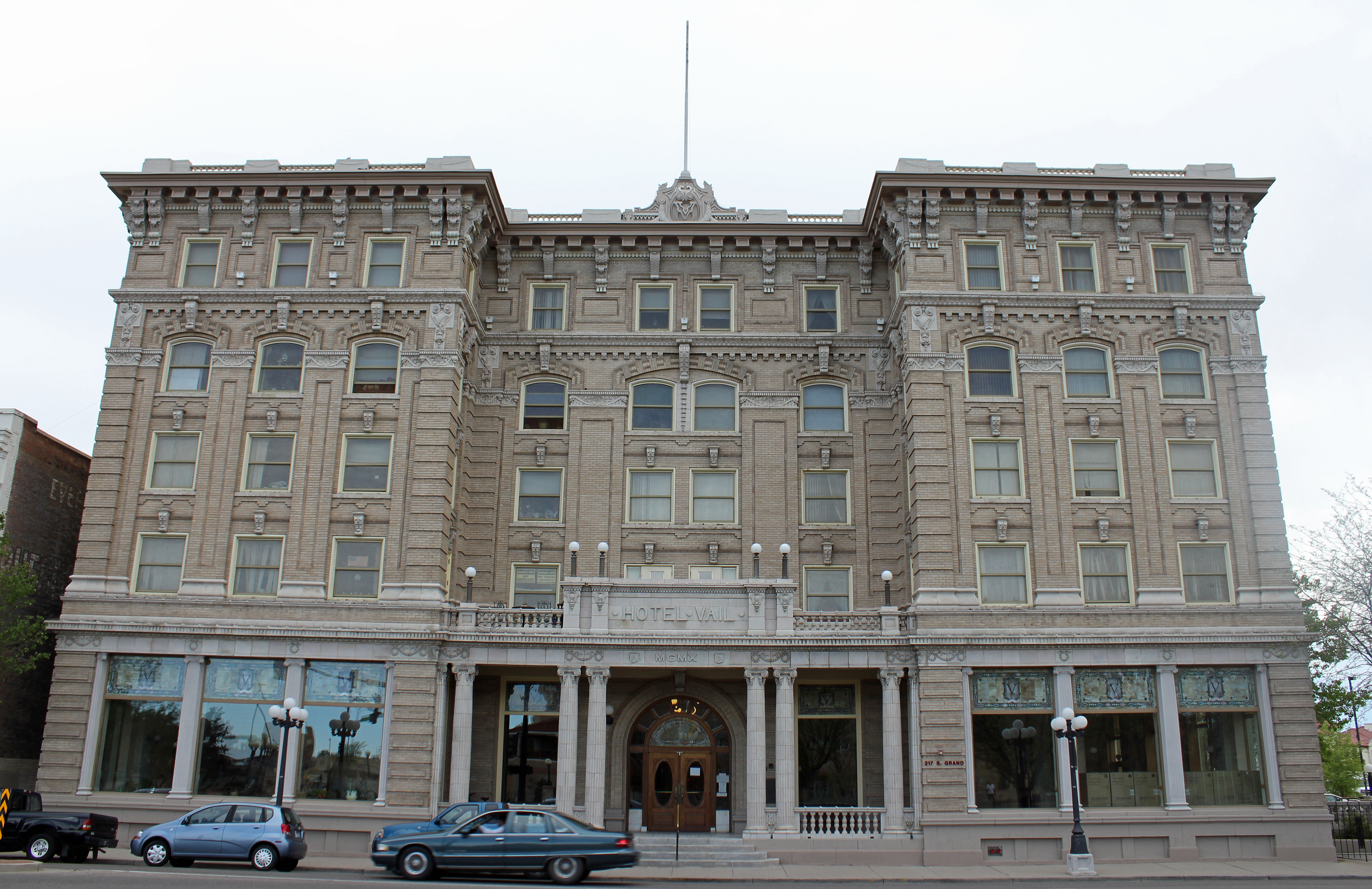

- Location within Colorado Location within the United States
- Location: 217 S. Grand Ave., Pueblo, Colorado
- Coordinates: 38°15′59″N 104°37′18″W
- Area: 0.4 acres (0.16 ha)
- Built: 1910
- Architect: J.M. Gile, et al.
- Architectural style: Late 19th And 20th Century Revivals, Second Renaissance Revival
- NRHP reference No.: 78000882
- Added to NRHP: December 18, 1978

Vail Hotel is located in Pueblo, Colorado. Named after Pueblo newspaperman John E Vail, the hotel constructed in 1910 was considered to be the most modern hotel west of Chicago at that time. It was designed by architect Jacob M. Gile.

== Contemporary use ==
The Housing Authority of the City of Pueblo bought the building in 1979. The agency then extensively refurbished the property, preserving its historic elements. The building's current use is public housing units for the elderly and disabled. Residents first occupied the renovated apartments in 1984.

== See also ==
- Yule marble
