= Stephen Jay Berg =

Fifth bishop of the Roman Catholic Diocese of Pueblo

His Excellency, The Most Reverend Stephen Jay Berg
- Bishop of Pueblo
- Diocese: Diocese of Pueblo
- Appointed: January 15, 2014
- Installed: February 27, 2014
- Predecessor: Fernando Isern

Orders
- Ordination: May 15, 1999 by Joseph Charron
- Consecration: February 27, 2014 by Samuel Joseph Aquila, Joseph Charron, and Michael John Sheridan

Personal details
- Born: March 3, 1951 (age 75) Miles City, Montana, US
- Education: University of Colorado Boulder; Eastern New Mexico University; Assumption Seminary; Oblate School of Theology
- Motto: Thy will be done

Styles of Stephen Jay Berg
- Reference style: The Most Reverend
- Spoken style: Your Excellency
- Religious style: Bishop

Stephen Jay Berg (born March 3, 1951) is an American prelate of the Roman Catholic Church who has been serving as bishop of the Diocese of Pueblo in Colorado since 2014.

== Biography ==
=== Early life ===
Stephen Berg was born on March 3, 1951, the eldest of ten children to Connie and Jeanne Berg, in Miles City, Montana. He was educated in the local Catholic schools and in 1969 graduated from Sacred Heart High School in Miles City. He earned a Bachelor of Music degree in piano performance from the University of Colorado Boulder in Boulder, Colorado, and a Master of Music degree from Eastern New Mexico University in Portales, New Mexico. After college, Berg taught music at Tarrant County College in Fort Worth, Texas. He later worked in management for a nursery company in Georgia, California, and Texas for 14 years.

In 1993, Berg started studies for the priesthood at Assumption Seminary in San Antonio, Texas. In 1999, he received a Master of Divinity degree at the Oblate School of Theology also in San Antonio.

=== Priesthood ===
On May 15, 1999, Berg was ordained a priest for the Diocese of Fort Worth by his uncle, Bishop Joseph Charron. After his ordination, Berg began serving as the parochial vicar at St. Michael’s Parish in Bedford, Texas. In 2001 he became parochial vicar at St. John the Apostle Parish in North Richland Hills, Texas.

In 2002, Berg was appointed pastor for four parishes in rural Texas:

- St. Mary's in Henrietta
- St. Jerome in Bowie
- St. William in Montague
- St. Joseph in Nocona

In 2008, Berg was appointed the vicar general of the diocese while also serving as the pastor of St. Peter the Apostle Parish in Fort Worth. In 2012, he was named moderator of the curia and parochial administrator of Holy Name of Jesus Parish in Fort Worth. In December 2012, Berg was elected diocesan administrator sede vacante by the diocesan board of consultors.

=== Bishop of Pueblo ===
Pope Francis named Berg as the bishop of the Diocese of Pueblo on January 15, 2014. He was consecrated on February 27, 2014, by Archbishop Samuel Aquila. Bishop Charron and Bishop Michael Sheridan were the principal co-consecrators. The liturgy was held in Pueblo Memorial Hall in Pueblo, Colorado.

In 2020, the Diocese of Pueblo faced scrutiny following a report released by former U.S. Attorney Bob Troyer concerning its handling of historical sexual abuse allegations. According to local media reports, the diocese delayed notifying law enforcement for several months after receiving an allegation involving a former priest. Advocacy organizations, including (SNAP) Survivors Network of those Abused by Priests, called for disciplinary action, citing concerns about transparency and accountability in the diocese’s response. Bishop Stephen Berg disputed aspects of the report, stating that the diocese had followed its established procedures and that most allegations are reported promptly, attributing the delay to the manner in which the claim was initially received.

On August 10, 2021, Berg and other Colorado bishops signed a letter opposing mandatory COVID-19 vaccinations for business and government employees. In June 2022, Berg and the other Colorado bishops expressed their displeasure at the passing of the Reproductive Health Equity Act (RHEA) by the Colorado General Assembly. The bishops called for state legislators who supported the bill to refrain from taking communion during mass.

== See also ==
- Catholic Church hierarchy
- Catholic Church in the United States
- Historical list of the Catholic bishops of the United States
- List of Catholic bishops of the United States
- Lists of patriarchs, archbishops, and bishops

== Episcopal succession ==
Catholic Church titles
Preceded by Fernando Isern	Bishop of Pueblo; 2014 – present	Succeeded by incumbent
