= Galligan House =

- U.S. National Register of Historic Places
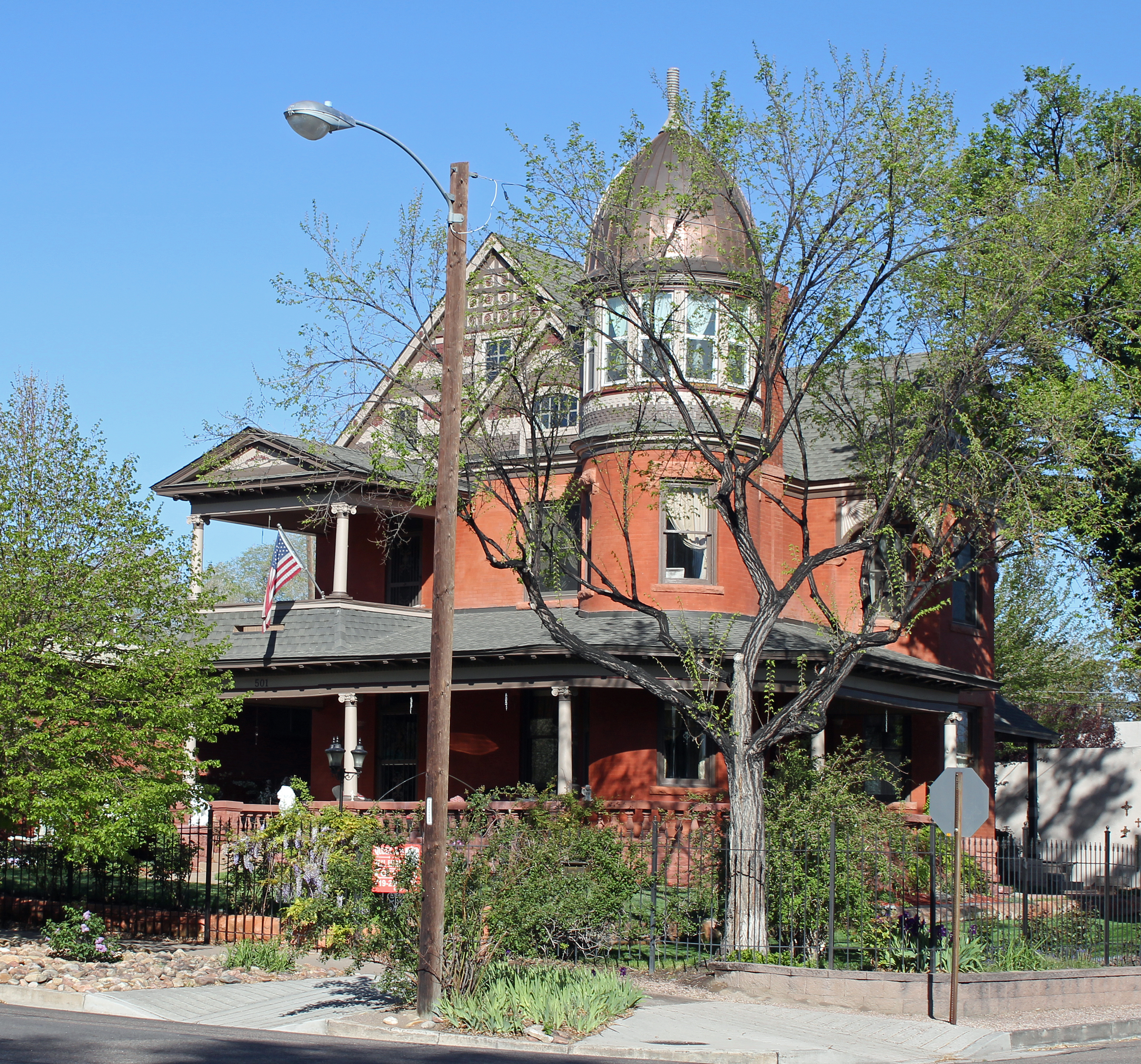

- Location within Colorado
- Location: 501 Colorado Ave., Pueblo, Colorado
- Coordinates: 38°15′19″N 104°37′34″W
- Area: less than one acre
- Built: 1891
- Built by: Miles McGrath
- Architect: Miles McGrath
- Architectural style: Queen Anne
- NRHP reference No.: 82002311
- Added to NRHP: June 3, 1982

The Galligan House, at 501 Colorado Ave. in Pueblo, Colorado, is a Queen Anne-style house which was built in 1891 for a prominent Pueblo lawyer. It was listed on the National Register of Historic Places in 1982.

It was built for Judge Mathew J. Galligan and his wife Minnie J. Bailey Galligan by Miles McGrath. McGrath was the architect, contractor and building supervisor. Galligan (1855-1930), was born in Washington County, Wisconsin, worked for Union Pacific in Nebraska and Iowa, and studied law, and practiced briefly in Denver, and moved to Pueblo in 1883.

The house was deemed "significant architecturally as an intact example of a well designed and beautifully finished upper-class dwelling of its era" and "significant historically for its connection with the well respected and civic minded lawyer, Mathew J. Galligan. Members of the Galligan family lived in the home for eighty-six years."

Another source calls the house "a fine example of the Queen Anne style with its wrap around porch and circular tower."
