= Martin Walter House =

- U.S. National Register of Historic Places
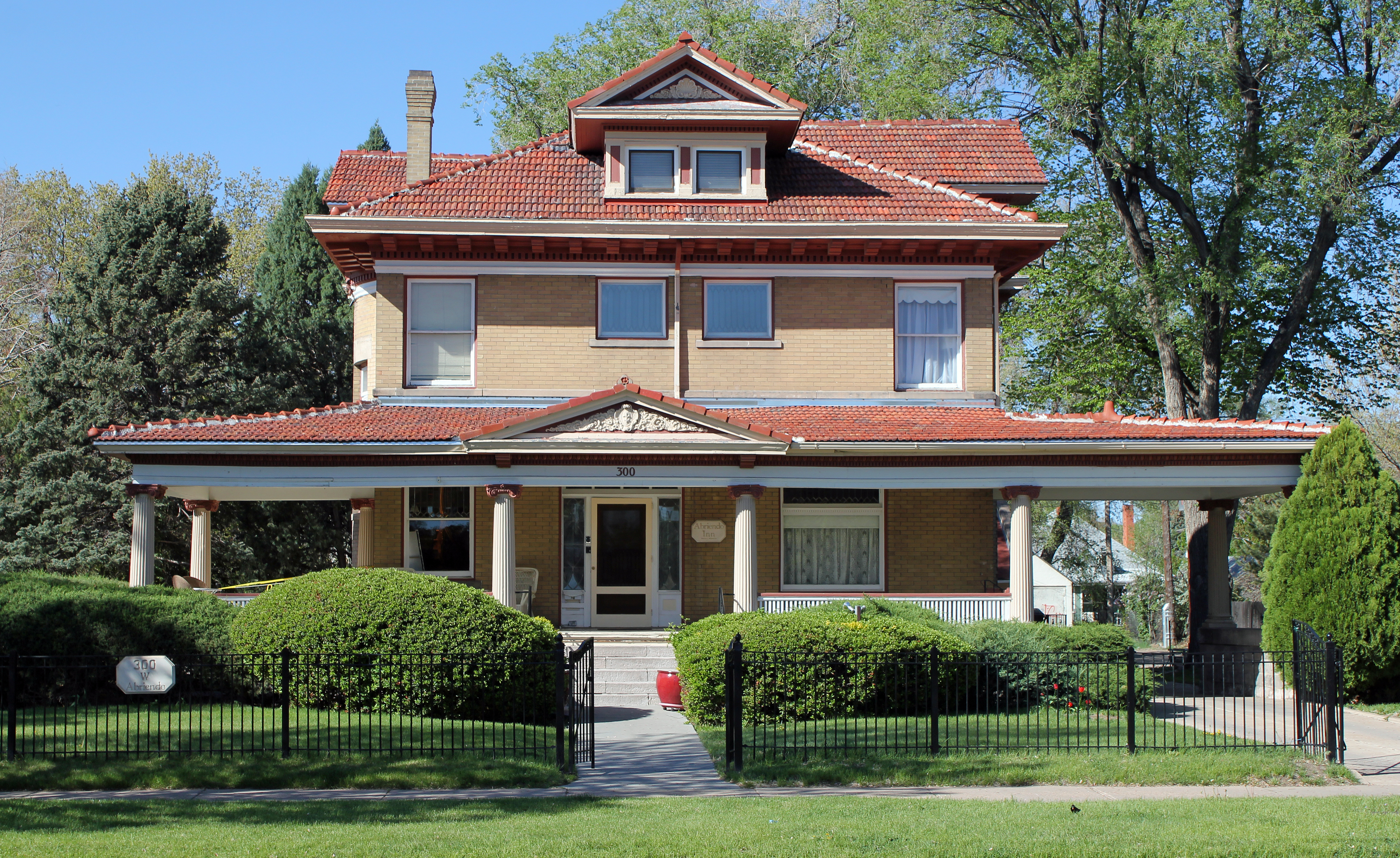

- Location within Colorado
- Location: 300 W. Abriendo Ave., Pueblo, Colorado
- Coordinates: 38.26159°N 104.62440°W
- Area: 0.7 acres (0.28 ha)
- Built: c.1906-08, c.1912
- Architect: P.C. Pape
- Architectural style: Foursquare
- NRHP reference No.: 84000894
- Added to NRHP: May 17, 1984

The Martin Walter House, also known as Walter's Mansion, at 300 W. Abriendo Ave. in Pueblo, Colorado, was built c. 1906–08. It was listed on the National Register of Historic Places in 1984.

== History ==
It is a two-story, brick building. It was "one of the largest-scale and most elaborately detailed structures designed in the "Foursquare" or "Classic Box" style found in Pueblo."

Around 1912, a Los Angeles architect named P.C. Pape drew up plans for remodeling of the house; the only part of the plans implemented was to add a porte cochere.

Walter had moved to Pueblo to operate the Pueblo Brewery, which he had purchased for $7,000 in 1898; it became one of the two most-known Colorado breweries along with Coors Brewery.

The historical merit of the house includes serving as "the sole landmark of the Walter family and the role Martin Walter played in the early development of Pueblo", after the brewery itself was destroyed by fire and vandalism, after its closing.

== See also ==
- Walter Brewing Company
