= Homestead, Oklahoma =

Unincorporated community in Oklahoma, US

- Unincorporated community and Census designated place
- Location of Homestead in Oklahoma Homestead, Oklahoma (the United States)
- Coordinates: 36°09′00″N 98°23′49″W
- Country: United States
- State: Oklahoma
- County: Blaine

Area
  - Total: 0.76 sq mi (1.96 km^{2})
  - Land: 0.76 sq mi (1.96 km^{2})
  - Water: 0 sq mi (0.00 km^{2})
- Elevation: 1,257 ft (383 m)

Population (2020)
  - Total: 41
  - Density: 54/sq mi (20.9/km^{2})
- Time zone: UTC-6 (Central (CST))
  - Summer (DST): UTC-5 (CDT)
- Area code: 580
- FIPS code: 40-35800
- GNIS feature ID: 2805324

Homestead is a small unincorporated community in northern Blaine County, Oklahoma, United States. As of the 2020 census, Homestead had a population of 41. The town was platted along the Choctaw Northern Railroad (later the Rock Island) before statehood. The Homestead Post Office opened January 26, 1893. Homestead had a population of 150 residents in 1905, according to the Oklahoma Territorial Census. The town lost rail service around 1926.

== Demographics ==
=== 2020 census ===
As of the 2020 census, Homestead had a population of 41. The median age was 40.3 years. 26.8% of residents were under the age of 18 and 39.0% of residents were 65 years of age or older. For every 100 females there were 95.2 males, and for every 100 females age 18 and over there were 87.5 males age 18 and over.

0.0% of residents lived in urban areas, while 100.0% lived in rural areas.

There were 19 households in Homestead, of which 42.1% had children under the age of 18 living in them. Of all households, 57.9% were married-couple households, 10.5% were households with a male householder and no spouse or partner present, and 15.8% were households with a female householder and no spouse or partner present. About 21.0% of all households were made up of individuals and 5.3% had someone living alone who was 65 years of age or older.

There were 19 housing units, of which 0.0% were vacant. The homeowner vacancy rate was 0.0% and the rental vacancy rate was 0.0%.

Racial composition as of the 2020 census
Race	Number	Percent
White	37	90.2%
Black or African American	0	0.0%
American Indian and Alaska Native	0	0.0%
Asian	0	0.0%
Native Hawaiian and Other Pacific Islander	0	0.0%
Some other race	2	4.9%
Two or more races	2	4.9%
Hispanic or Latino (of any race)	4	9.8%
