= Barndollar–Gann House =

Historic house in Pueblo, Colorado, US

- U.S. National Register of Historic Places
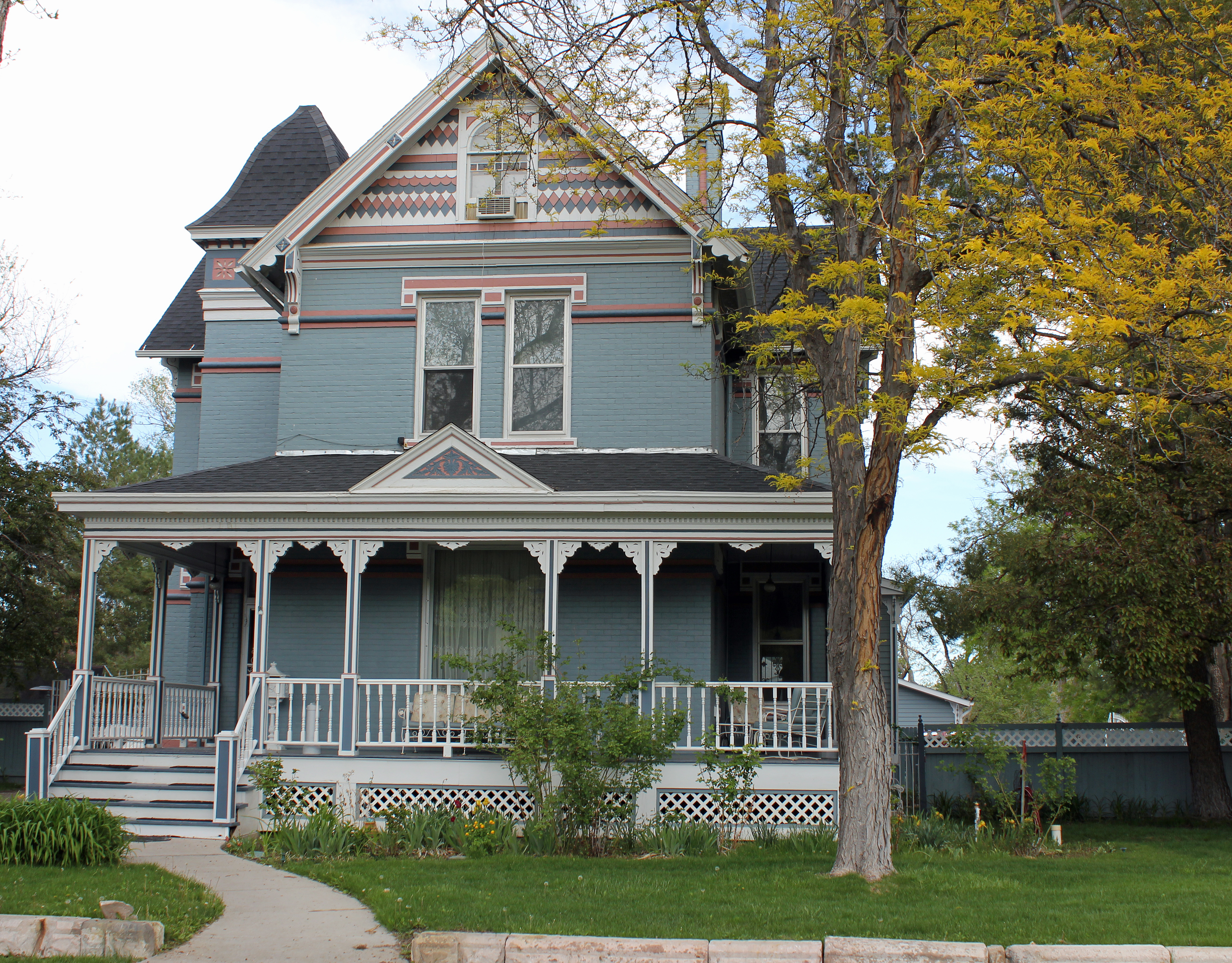

- Location within Colorado
- Location: 1906 Court Street, Pueblo, Colorado, US
- Coordinates: 38°17′06″N 104°36′34″W
- Area: 0.4 acres (0.16 ha)
- Built: 1889
- Architect: Patrick P. Mills
- Architectural style: Queen Anne
- NRHP reference No.: 85002761
- Added to NRHP: November 7, 1985

The Barndollar–Gann House is an 1889 historic house in Pueblo, Colorado, U.S. It has been listed on the National Register of Historic Places since 1985, for the architecture.

== History and architecture ==
The 1889 Barndollar–Gann House was designed in the Queen Anne style by architect P. P. Mills (Patrick P. Mills), for W. J. Barndollar, a banker, businessman, real estate broker, and politician. Barndollar was murdered on March 21, 1896 at his home in a robbery. Subsequently the house was purchased by George L. L. Gann, a local merchant.

The original exterior detailing is intact. Important features of the building design include the wrap-around porch, multi-gabled roof, a tower, shingled gables, and tall chimneys.

== See also ==
- National Register of Historic Places listings in Pueblo County, Colorado
