= Rood Candy Company Building =

- U.S. National Register of Historic Places
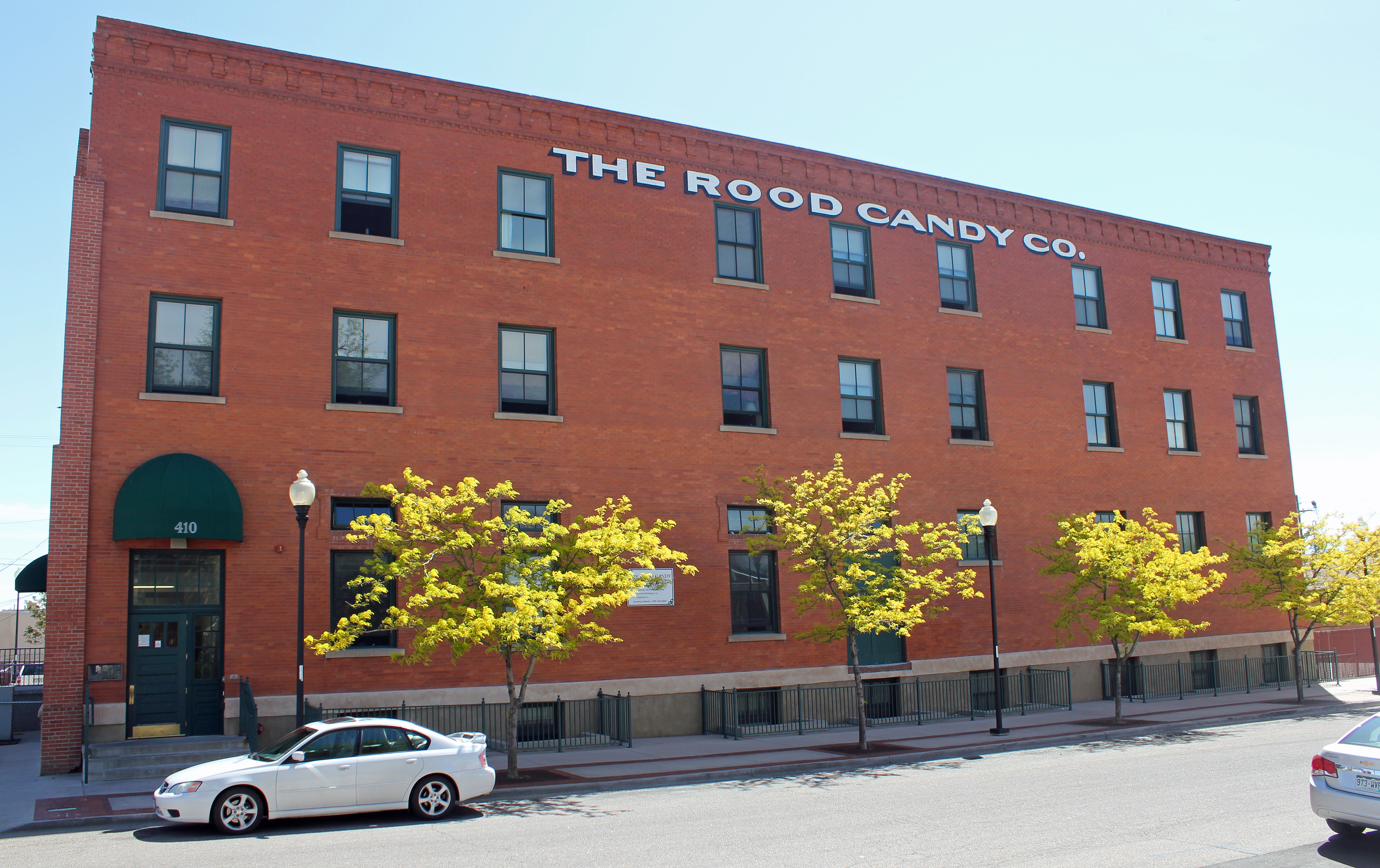

- Location within Colorado Location within the United States
- Location: 408-416 W. 7th St., Pueblo, Colorado
- Coordinates: 38°16′23″N 104°36′43″W
- Area: 0.6 acres (0.24 ha)
- Built: 1909
- NRHP reference No.: 84000882
- Added to NRHP: May 17, 1984

The Rood Candy Company Building is a historic manufacturing plant of the Rood Candy Company in Pueblo, Colorado, United States. It was built in 1909 and was listed on the National Register of Historic Places in 1984.

The company was founded by Aaron Rood, who was born in Windham County, Connecticut in 1845. He served in Company B, Ninety-Second Illinois Infantry, during the American Civil War. He moved to Boulder, Colorado in 1872 and to Pueblo in 1895. He helped build the Pueblo Cracker and Confectionery Company which was sold to the American Biscuit Company in 1891. He founded the Colorado Confectionery Company in the early 1900s which became the Rood Candy Company around 1910. It was one of the leading candy manufacturers in the state, operating up to the late 1930s.

There is the main building and also a second contributing building, which is a gable-roofed stable.
