= Harveng =

Sub-municipality of the city of Mons, Belgium

Harveng Harvent (Walloon)
- Sub-municipality of Mons
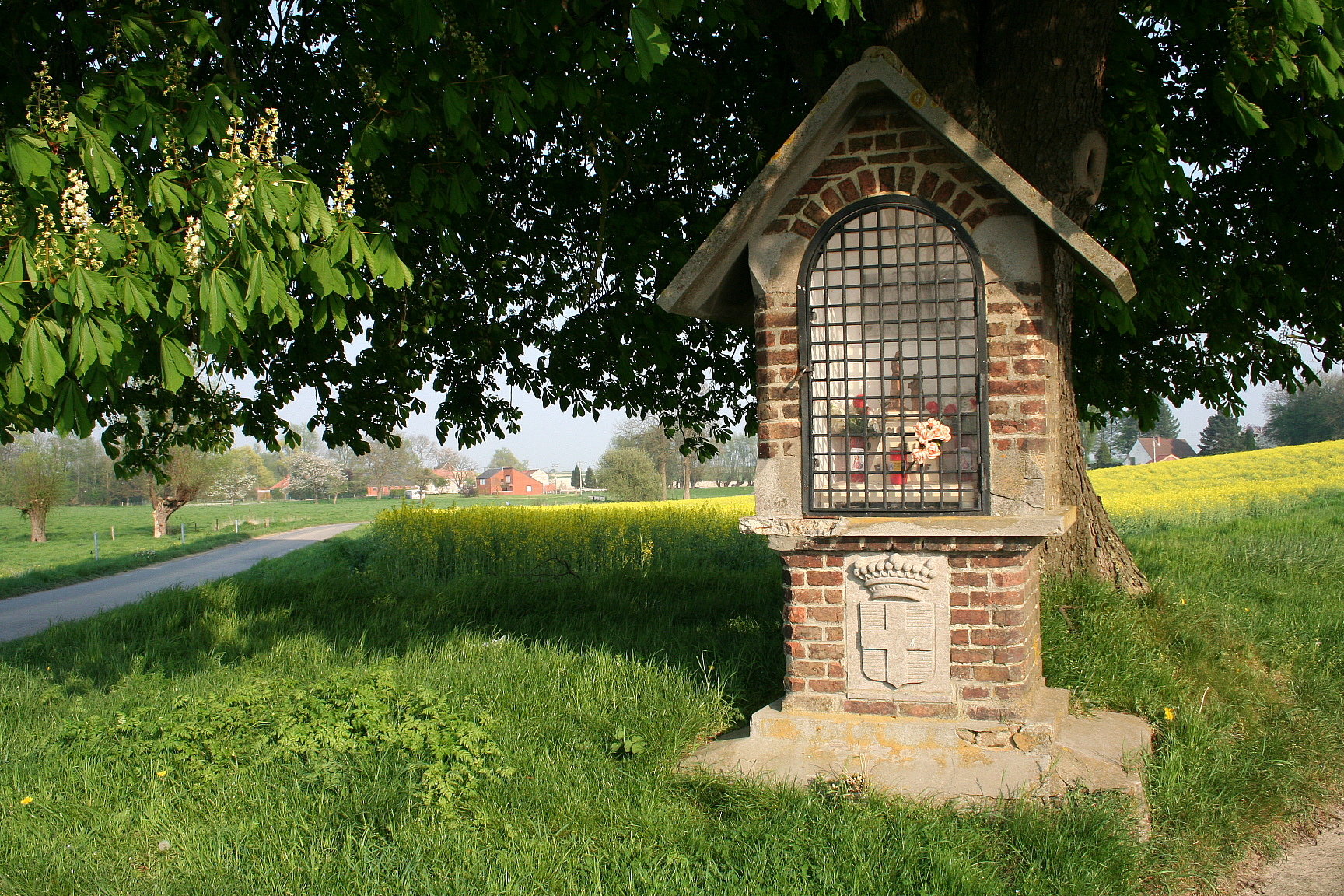

- Location of Harveng in Mons
- Interactive map of Harveng
- Location within Belgium Location within Hainaut (Belgium)
- Coordinates: 50°23′42″N 3°59′13″E
- Country: Belgium
- Community: French Community
- Region: Wallonia
- Province: Hainaut
- Arrondissement: Mons
- Municipality: Mons

Area
  - Total: 6.68 km^{2} (2.58 sq mi)

Population (2020-01-01)
  - Total: 473
  - Density: 70.8/km^{2} (183/sq mi)
- Postal codes: 7022
- Area codes: 065

Harveng (French pronunciation: [aʁvɑ̃]; Walloon: Harvent) is a sub-municipality of the city of Mons located in the province of Hainaut, Wallonia, Belgium. It was a separate municipality until 1977. On 1 January 1977, it was merged into Mons.

== Gallery ==
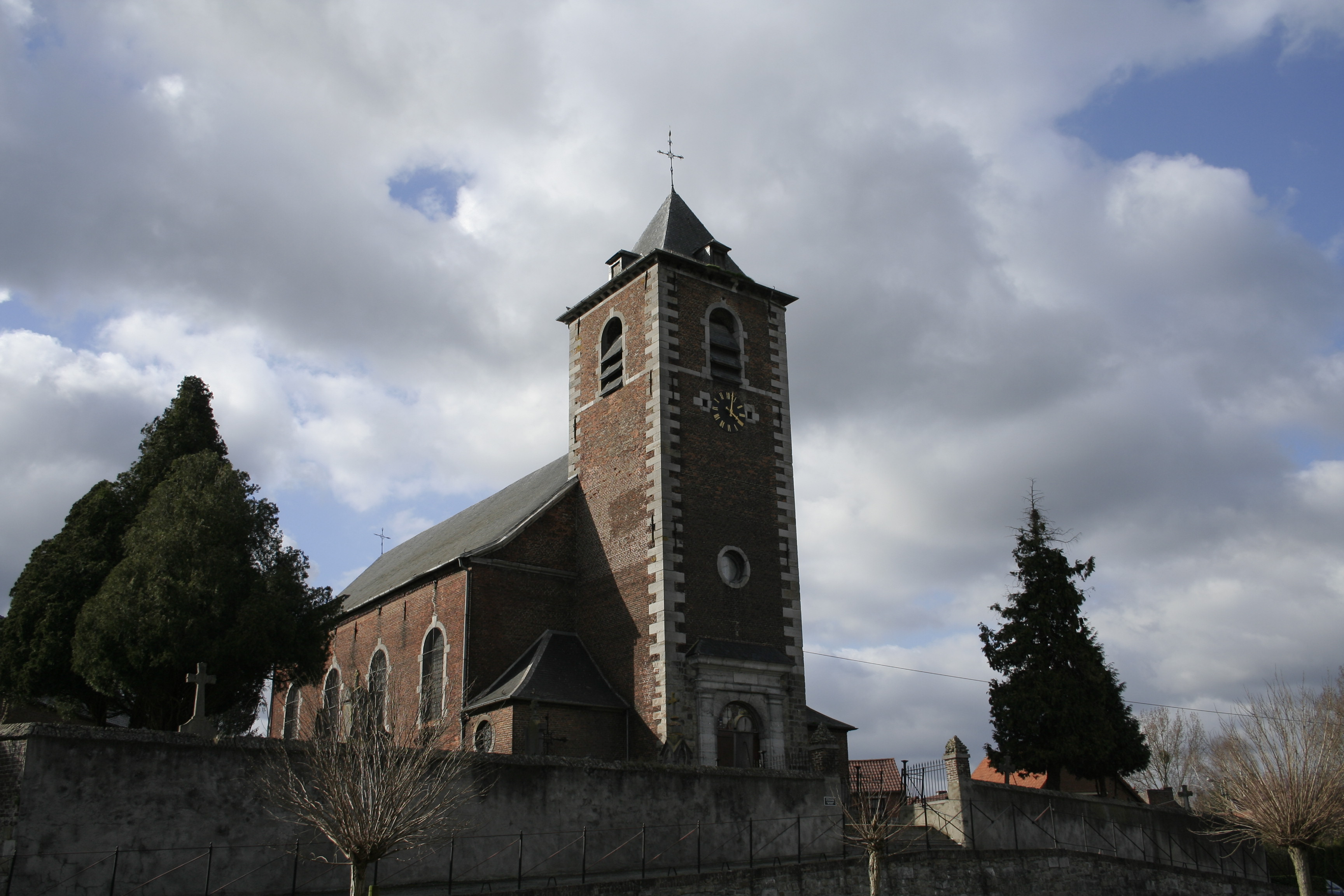
Church Saint-Martin (1780).

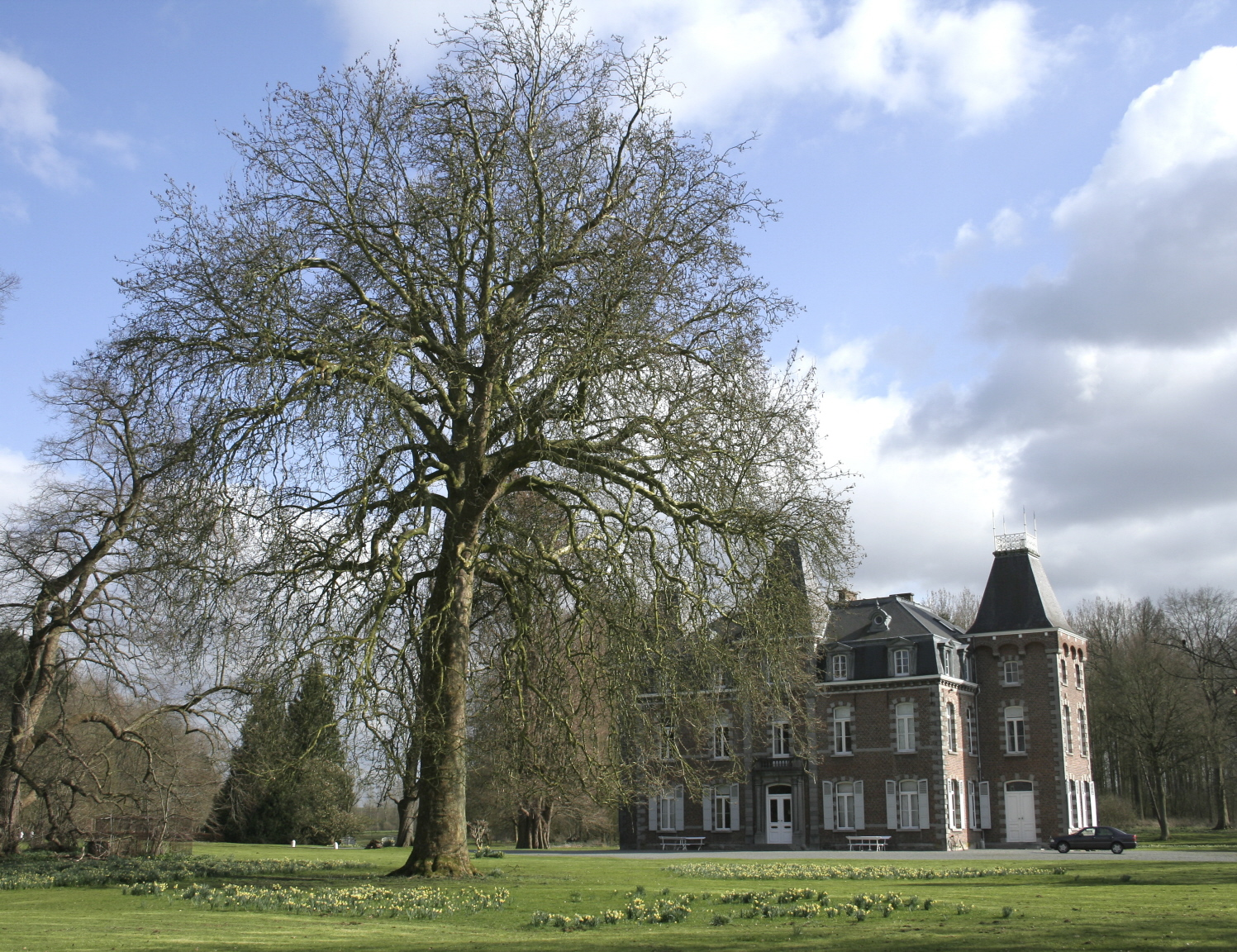
Castle of Marchienne and park (18th/19th centuries)
