= J. L. Streit House =

- U.S. National Register of Historic Places
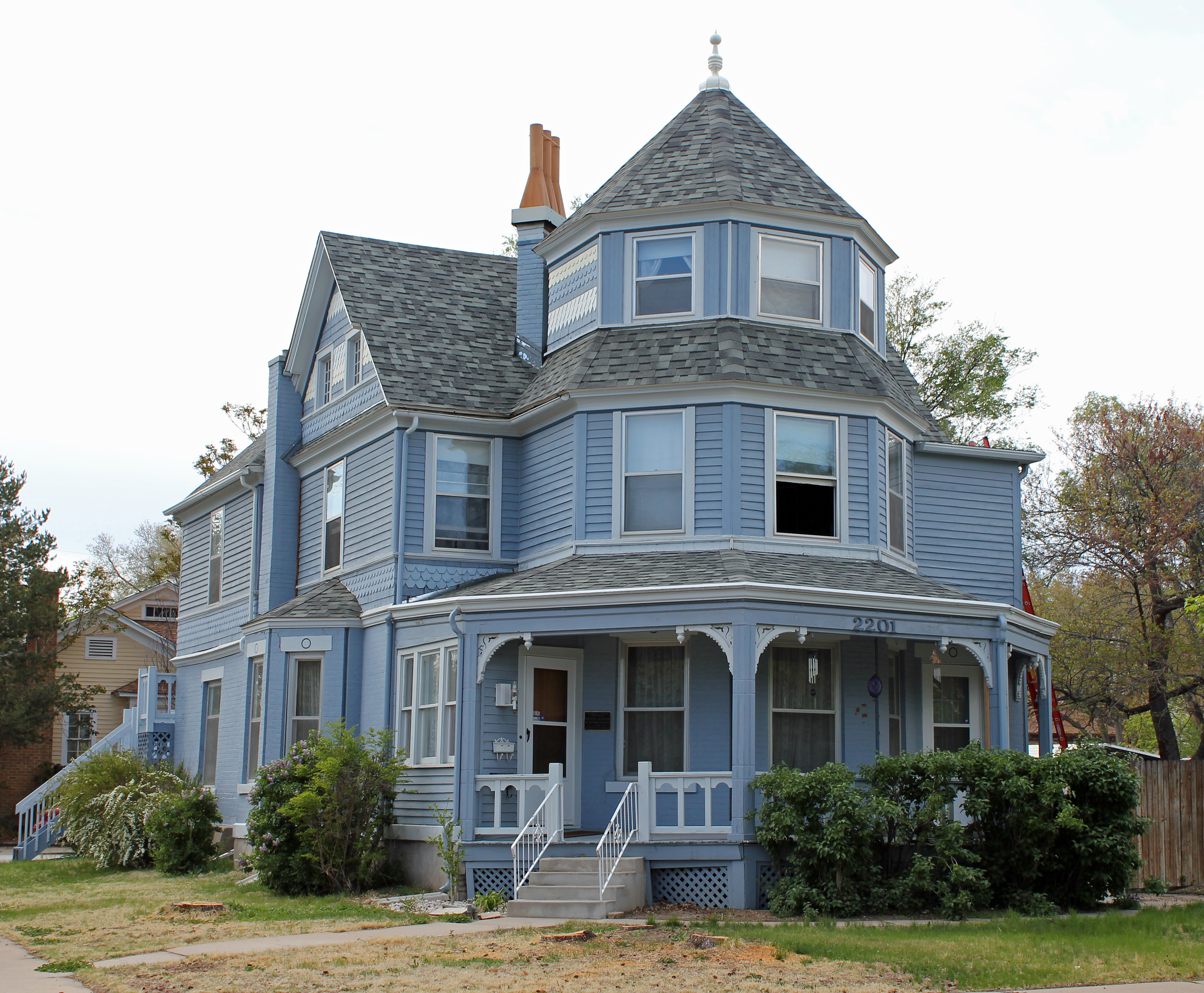

- Location within Colorado
- Location: 2201 Grand Ave., Pueblo, Colorado
- Coordinates: 38.288611°N 104.611667°W
- Area: 0.1 acres (0.040 ha)
- Built: 1888
- Built by: Meyers Bros.
- Architect: Patrick P. Mills
- Architectural style: Queen Anne
- NRHP reference No.: 84000892
- Added to NRHP: September 20, 1984

The J. L. Streit House, at 2201 Grand Ave. in Pueblo, Colorado, is a Queen Anne-style house which was built in 1888. It was listed on the National Register of Historic Places in 1984.

Its front is dominated by a polygonal tower which gave rise to it being known locally as the "octagon house".

It was designed by local architect Patrick P. Mills (d.1933).

It was deemed significant "due to its historic role in the development of Pueblo as one of the premier model homes for the Dundee Investment Company, and for its unique octagonal frontal tower which gained, for it, local landmark status as the brainchild of pioneer architect, P. P. Mills."

It has also been known as the Creel House.
