= Alameda, New Mexico =

- Unincorporated community
- Location within New Mexico
- Coordinates: 35°11′12″N 106°37′05″W
- Country: United States
- State: New Mexico
- County: Bernalillo
- Elevation: 5,003 ft (1,525 m)
- Time zone: UTC-7 (Mountain (MST))
  - Summer (DST): UTC-6 (MDT)
- Area code: 505
- GNIS feature ID: 903031

Alameda is an unincorporated community in Bernalillo County, New Mexico.

== Notable person ==
- Arthur Tafoya (1933–2018), Roman Catholic bishop
