= List of contributing properties in the Historic Union Ave Commercial District =

List of historic buildings

This is a list of contributing properties in the Union Avenue Historic Commercial District:

Leading contributing properties
Name	Address	Date of construction	Notability
The Favorite Tavern	119 W. B St.	1905	
Union Depot	132 W. B St.	1890	Richardsonian Romanesque Revival style, the depot was one of the largest and busiest in the region. listed on the National Register 04/01/1975, 5PE.494
Vail Hotel	217 S. Grand	1910	When Construction was completed it was regarded as the most modern hotel west of Chicago
City Hall	1 City Hall Pl.	1917	Represents the work of a master
Pueblo Memorial Auditorium	1 City Hall Pl.	1919	Site of President Woodrow Wilson's last public speech, as well as hosting the third largest pipe organ in the U.S.
Quaker Flour Mill	102 S. Oneida St.	1869	
Joseph H. Edwards Senior Center	230 N. Union Ave.	1887	
Cope Office Supply	102 S. Victoria Ave.	1893	
Elmer's Sheet Metal	101-103 S. Union Ave.	1889	
Boyle Block	105-107 S. Union Ave.	1889	
Heart-Light Metaphysical Store	124 S. Union Ave.	1905	
Lamplight Coffee Company	126 S. Union Ave.	1905	
Gold Dust Block	130 S. Union Ave.	1889	Originally owned by Andrew Mcgovern, an Irish immigrant, later city councilman and prominent Pueblo Merchant. Responsible for raising the first Pueblo Catholic Church south of the Arkansas River.
Lamplight Coffee Company	126 S. Union Ave.	1905	
Military Surplus	206 S. Union Ave.	1891	
Lamplight Coffee Company	126 S. Union Ave.	1905	
Kushnir Furniture Building	214-216 S. Union Ave.	1900	
Angelo's Pizza	223 S. Union Ave.	1905	
	226-228 S. Union Ave.	1887	listed on National Register Of Historic Places
Seabel's	231-233 S. Union Ave.	1881	Distinct Architectural style, also notable for association with Delos L. Holden, prominent banker, building, Investor and politician
Magpies	229 S. Union Ave.	1896	
Deremer Block	230 S. Union Ave.	1882	
McLaughlin Building	330 S. Union Ave.	1891	
Holmes Hardware	400 S. Union Ave.	1915	
Pueblo Southwest Trading	104 S. Victoria Ave.	1894	
The Senate Bar	219 S. Grand Ave.	1904	Best known for association with two previously competing Pueblo Newspapers.
