= Veterans Bridge =

Veterans Bridge may refer to a bridge in the United States:

- Veterans Bridge (Chesapeake, Virginia), on U.S. 17 which replaced Dominion Boulevard Steel Bridge
- Veterans Bridge (Pittsburgh), Pennsylvania, part of Interstate 579
- Veterans' Bridge (Pueblo), Colorado
- Veterans Bridge (St. Cloud, Minnesota)
- Veteran's International Bridge, in Brownsville, Texas
- Martin Luther King Bridge (St. Louis), Missouri, formerly known as the Veterans Bridge

== See also ==
- Veterans Memorial Bridge (disambiguation)
