= Drew Dennis Dix =

United States Army Medal of Honor recipient

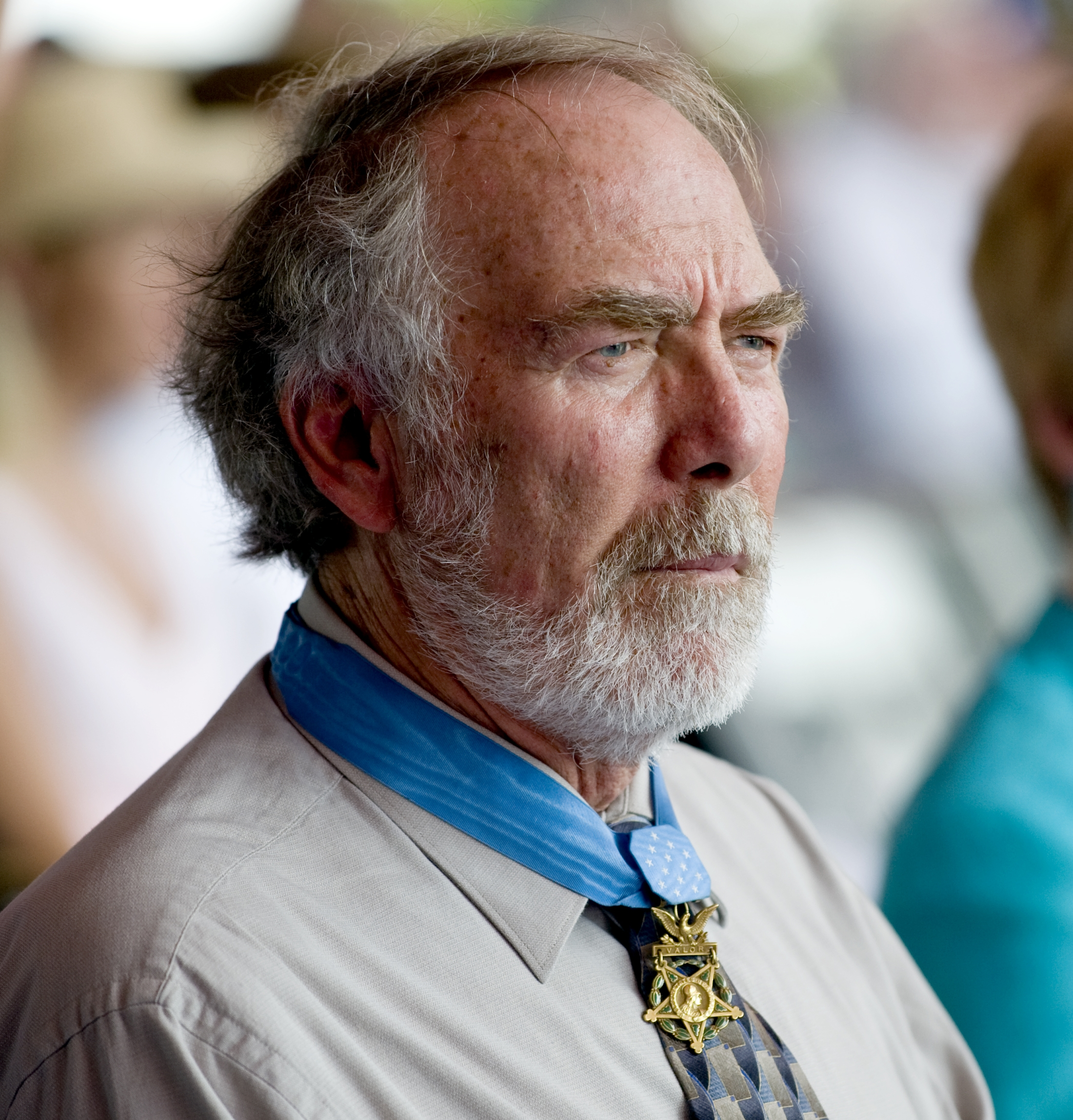
- Dix in 2010
- Born: December 14, 1944 (age 81); West Point, New York, U.S.
- Military career
- Allegiance: United States
- Branch: United States Army
- Service years: 1962–1982
- Rank: Major
- Units: 82nd Airborne Division; 5th Special Forces Group; 9th Infantry Regiment
- Conflicts: Operation Power Pack; Vietnam War
- Awards: Medal of Honor; Purple Heart; Cross of Gallantry (Vietnam)

Drew Dennis Dix (born December 14, 1944) is a decorated United States military veteran and retired major in the United States Army. He received the Medal of Honor for his actions in the Vietnam War; he was the first enlisted Special Forces soldier to receive the medal.

== Early life ==
Dix was born in West Point, New York, and raised in Pueblo, Colorado. He attended and graduated from Centennial High School.

== Military career ==
Dix enlisted in the United States Army at age 18 in 1962, hoping to join the Special Forces. Initially turned down because of his young age, he spent three years serving with the 82nd Airborne Division before being accepted into the Special Forces at the age of 21. During this time, he served in Operation Power Pack, the United States military intervention in the Dominican Republic.

By 1968, Dix had reached the rank of staff sergeant, and was assigned as a military adviser to the Army of the Republic of Vietnam (ARVN) in Chau Phu, South Vietnam, near the Cambodian border. On January 31, 1968, Viet Cong forces attacked Chau Phu in the first days of the Tet Offensive. Throughout that day and the next, Dix led groups of local fighters in rescuing endangered civilians and driving Viet Cong forces out of buildings in the city.

For these actions, Dix was awarded the Medal of Honor by President Lyndon B. Johnson during a ceremony at the White House on January 19, 1969. He is one of four Medal of Honor recipients from Pueblo, Colorado. In 1993, the Pueblo City Council adopted the tagline "Home of Heroes" for the city due to the fact that Pueblo can claim more recipients of the Medal per capita than any other city in the United States. On July 1, 1993, the Congressional Record recognized Pueblo as the "Home of Heroes." The other men were William J. Crawford, Raymond G. Murphy, and Carl L. Sitter.

Dix later received a direct commission to first lieutenant and retired as a major after 20 years of service. His last duty assignment was Executive Officer of the 4th Battalion, 9th Infantry Regiment, 172nd Infantry Brigade (Separate), Fort Wainwright, Alaska, from 1981 to 1982.

== Later life ==
After leaving the army, Dix worked as a security consultant, ran an air service in Alaska, and served as Alaska's deputy commissioner for homeland security.

In 2000, Dix wrote a memoir about the fight for Chau Phu entitled "The Rescue of River City" (ISBN 978-0970309600). Since receiving the medal, he has made numerous public speaking engagements. He currently lives in the interior region of Alaska.

In 2010, Dix co-founded the Center for American Values in Pueblo, Colorado.

== Awards and decorations ==
=== Medal of Honor ===
The President of the United States in the name of the Congress takes pride in presenting the Medal of Honor to Staff Sergeant Drew Dennis Dix United States Army for service as set forth in the following citation:

For conspicuous gallantry and intrepidity in action at the risk of his life above and beyond the call of duty. SSG. Dix distinguished himself by exceptional heroism while serving as a unit adviser. Two heavily armed Viet Cong battalions attacked the Province capital city of Chau Phu resulting in the complete breakdown and fragmentation of the defenses of the city. SSG. Dix, with a patrol of Vietnamese soldiers, was recalled to assist in the defense of Chau Phu. Learning that a nurse was trapped in a house near the center of the city, SSG. Dix organized a relief force, successfully rescued the nurse, and returned her to the safety of the Tactical Operations Center. Being informed of other trapped civilians within the city, SSG. Dix voluntarily led another force to rescue eight civilian employees located in a building which was under heavy mortar and small-arms fire. SSG. Dix then returned to the center of the city. Upon approaching a building, he was subjected to intense automatic rifle and machinegun fire from an unknown number of Viet Cong. He personally assaulted the building, killing six Viet Cong, and rescuing two Filipinos. The following day SSG. Dix, still on his own volition, assembled a 20-man force and though under intense enemy fire cleared the Viet Cong out of the hotel, theater, and other adjacent buildings within the city. During this portion of the attack, Army Republic of Vietnam soldiers inspired by the heroism and success of SSG. Dix, rallied and commenced firing upon the Viet Cong. SSG. Dix captured 20 prisoners, including a high ranking Viet Cong official. He then attacked enemy troops who had entered the residence of the Deputy Province Chief and was successful in rescuing the official's wife and children. SSG. Dix's personal heroic actions resulted in 14 confirmed Viet Cong killed in action and possibly 25 more, the capture of 20 prisoners, 15 weapons, and the rescue of the 14 United States and free world civilians. The heroism of SSG. Dix was in the highest tradition and reflects great credit upon the U.S. Army.

=== Commendations ===

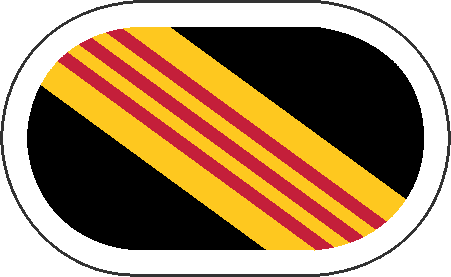
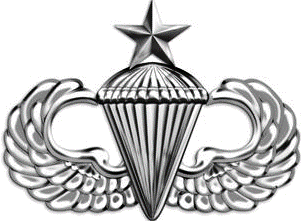

Badge	Combat Infantryman Badge		
1st row	Medal of Honor		Bronze Star
2nd row	Purple Heart	Air Medal	Army Good Conduct Medal awarded prior to receiving commission
3rd row	National Defense Service Medal	Armed Forces Expeditionary Medal	Vietnam Service Medal with 3 bronze campaign stars
4th row	Army Service Ribbon	Vietnamese Gallantry Cross with palm	Vietnam Campaign Medal
Badges	Special Forces Tab		Senior Parachutist Badge; 5th SFG (A) background trimming

== Publications ==
- Dix, Drew. The Rescue of River City. Fairbanks, Alaska: Drew Dix Pub, 2000. ISBN 0970309600

== See also ==
- List of Medal of Honor recipients for the Vietnam War
