= Pueblo Catholic High School =

Defunct Catholic high school in Colorado, USA

Coordinates: 38°15′15.33″N 104°37′13.96″W

Information
- Religious affiliation(s): Catholicism
- Established: 1875
- Closed: 1971
- Affiliation: Roman Catholic Diocese of Pueblo

Pueblo Catholic High School was a Catholic high school in Pueblo, Colorado, under the Roman Catholic Diocese of Pueblo.

The first Catholic school in Pueblo opened on Michigan Street in 1875 as St. Patrick High School, it was renamed in 1935 to Pueblo Catholic High. In 1950, a new Pueblo Catholic High School building was completed on Lake Avenue.

The school closed in 1971.

== Notable alumni ==
- Raymond G. Murphy- Class of 1947, awarded the Medal of Honor in 1953 for actions while serving in the United States Marine Corps during the Korean War
