= Union Avenue Historic Commercial District =

Historic district in Colorado, United States

- U.S. National Register of Historic Places
- U.S. Historic district
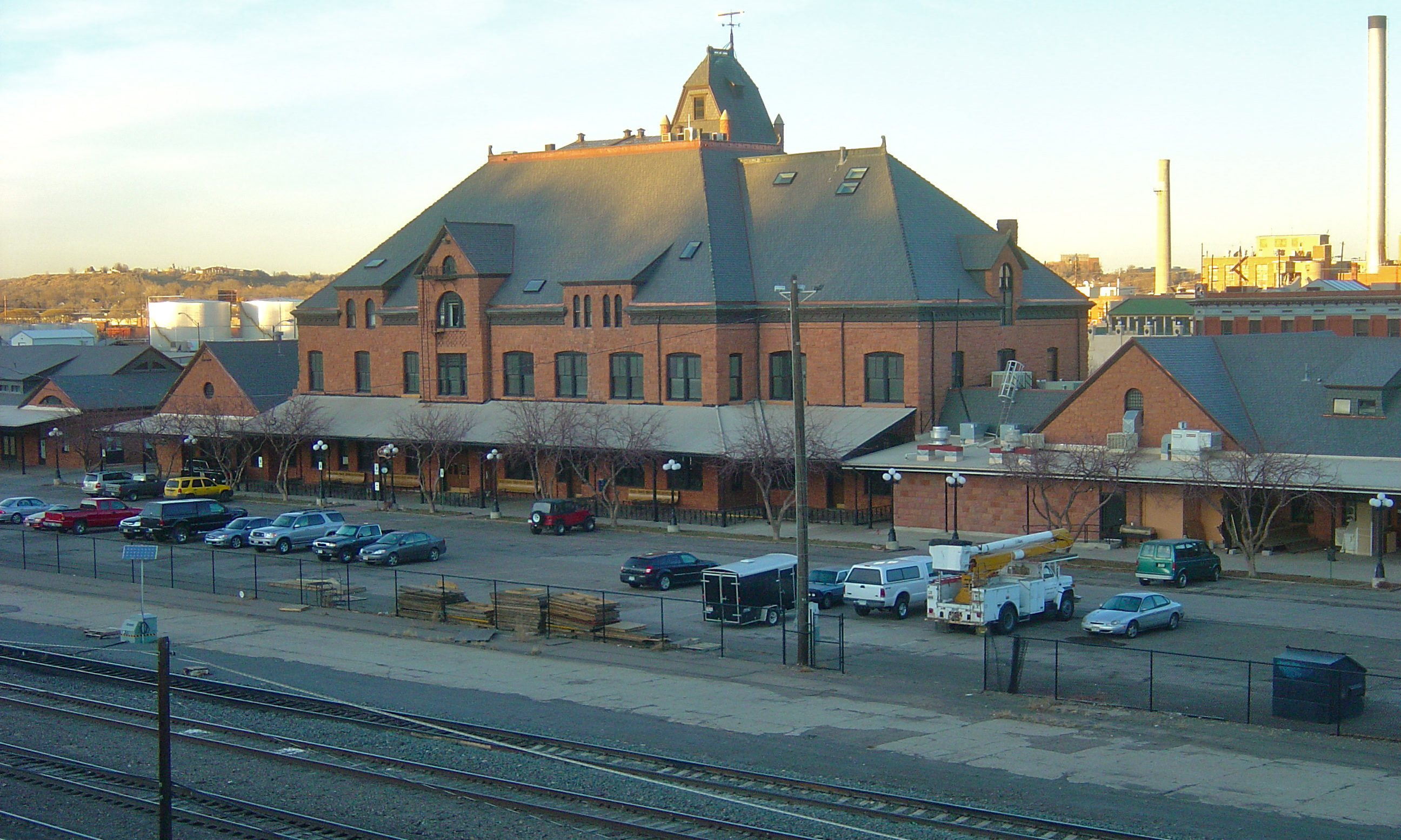
- Union Depot, a prominent building in the district

- Location within Colorado Location within the United States
- Location: Roughly bounded by railroad tracks, Main St., and Grand and Victoria Aves., Pueblo, Colorado
- Coordinates: 38°15′51″N 104°36′48″W
- Area: 27 acres (11 ha)
- Architects: G.W. Roe; P.P. Mills
- Architectural style: Late Victorian
- NRHP reference No.: 82001021
- Added to NRHP: December 28, 1982

The Union Avenue Historic Commercial District is a century-old business district in Pueblo, Colorado, United States. The district comprises sixty-nine contributing properties in a total area of 27 acres (11 ha) including the Union Depot, Vail Hotel and Quaker Flour Mill. In 1983, the district was listed on the National Register of Historic Places. The historic district was originally located within South Pueblo and Central Pueblo, two small cities until incorporated into Pueblo, Colorado which combined South Pueblo, Central Pueblo, Pueblo and Bessemer into one municipality. While still South Pueblo, Bat Masterson, best known for his association with Wyatt Earp and Doc Holliday was brought in as sheriff to protect a railroad that was being built.

== History ==
Little is known about the early history of the area. On maps as early as 1872, the area was called 5th Street, with the first known reference to Union Avenue in 1880. The Pueblo City Hall, also on the National Historic Register of Places, had a key part in the formation of the modern city of Pueblo. In Article VI of The Articles of Consolidation, it was agreed that City hall had to be within this district "not further north then 2nd street in the present city of Pueblo and not further south then the Arkansas River."

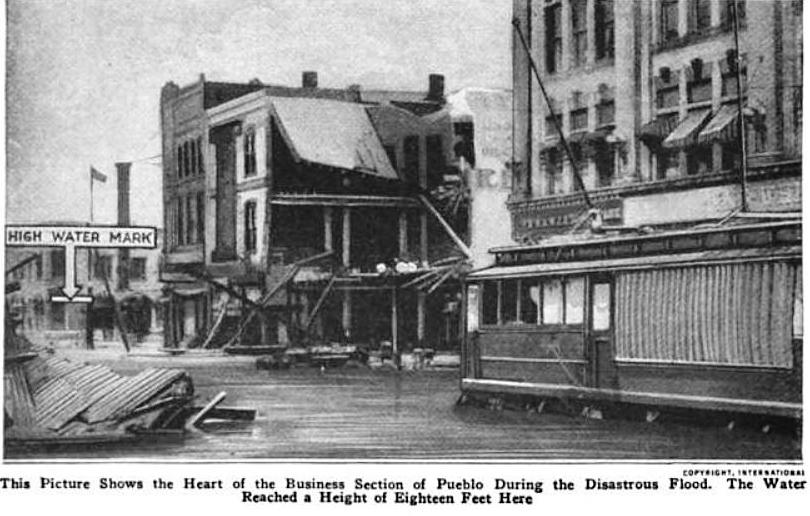
Caption from Popular Mechanics Magazine, 1921

The area has suffered several floods that have received national coverage due to the scope and the damage they caused to both the local and national economies. Before the current levee was constructed, the district and most of the rest of Pueblo was devastated by the single largest flood in Pueblo history in 1921. The damage was described to The Los Angeles Times by Maj. Paul P. Newlon, who took command of the state troops sent to help recovery, as "Conditions are beyond description...Virtually every building from the postoffice [sic] to the square beyond the Union station on Union avenue was completely wiped out." Waters as deep as 18 feet (5.5 m) almost completely destroyed the city's downtown and killed over 1,500 people. As Pueblo was the leading economic center of southern Colorado before the flood, both the city economy and the regional economy were severely set back.

Many of the existing buildings were built in the 1880s, but due to the floods many were remodeled to the standards of the time preceding the region's floods. Most notably this was an issue with the flood in 1921. With the collapse of the district economically and the decline of passenger railway use, the district soon became a notorious "Red Light District", known also for its many Taverns. Local folklore says that in the late 1930s the residents of Union Ave in the mesa junction area petitioned to have the street name changed, in order to avoid association with this element. In 1939 the upper portion of the street was renamed Colorado Ave.

Due to the impacts of negligent ownership and the age of the buildings, decay soon set in. Starting in 1996, a major voter approved project was started to renew the "unsightly" district to be a catalyst for cultural and economic growth. The Historic Arkansas River Project follows the original path of the Arkansas River, which had been rerouted after the 1921 flood. It has a special significance for Pueblo as it marks the former borders of France and Spain and later United States of America, Mexico and the Republic of Texas. By 2001 the addition of the Riverwalk was deemed a success in not only revitalizing the district, but helping the Pueblo city economy recover from a decade long recession the city had experienced after CF & I Steel laid off 3800 workers in 1982.

In November 2008, The Branch Inn, a historic building with ties to reputed mafioso Jo Jo Concialdi, was destroyed by a sudden explosion. One woman was killed and multiple other individuals were injured in the destruction of the Branch Inn. The century-old building was not only lost, but many other buildings in the area were damaged. An investigation by the Bureau of Alcohol, Tobacco, Firearms and Explosives determined that the explosion was the result of a gas leak. However, responsibility for the accident is disputed, with multiple parties alleging that the city is responsible for neglecting possible warning signs, and the city claiming that the local utility company failed to properly maintain the leaking pipeline. The local district attorney has announced that no criminal charges will be filed. By late 2009, plans had been laid for new construction on the vacant lot, a move welcomed by neighboring business owners.

The Union Avenue Historic Commercial District is a common location for community events. Annual events held in the district include the "B Street Bash" in June, Oktoberfest in September, and the autumn Pueblo Chile and Frijoles Festival. The district has been host to several well-known politicians over its history. Pueblo Memorial Hall hosted the Pueblo speech, which was the last public speech of president Woodrow Wilson. The city erected a plaque commemorating his speech in support of the League of Nations. The Union Avenue Historic Commercial District was the location of a rally for Barack Obama's presidential campaign on October 31, 2008.

== See also ==
- Contributing Properties in the Historic Union Ave Commercial District
