= William J. Crawford =

United States Army Medal of Honor recipient

William J. "Bill" Crawford
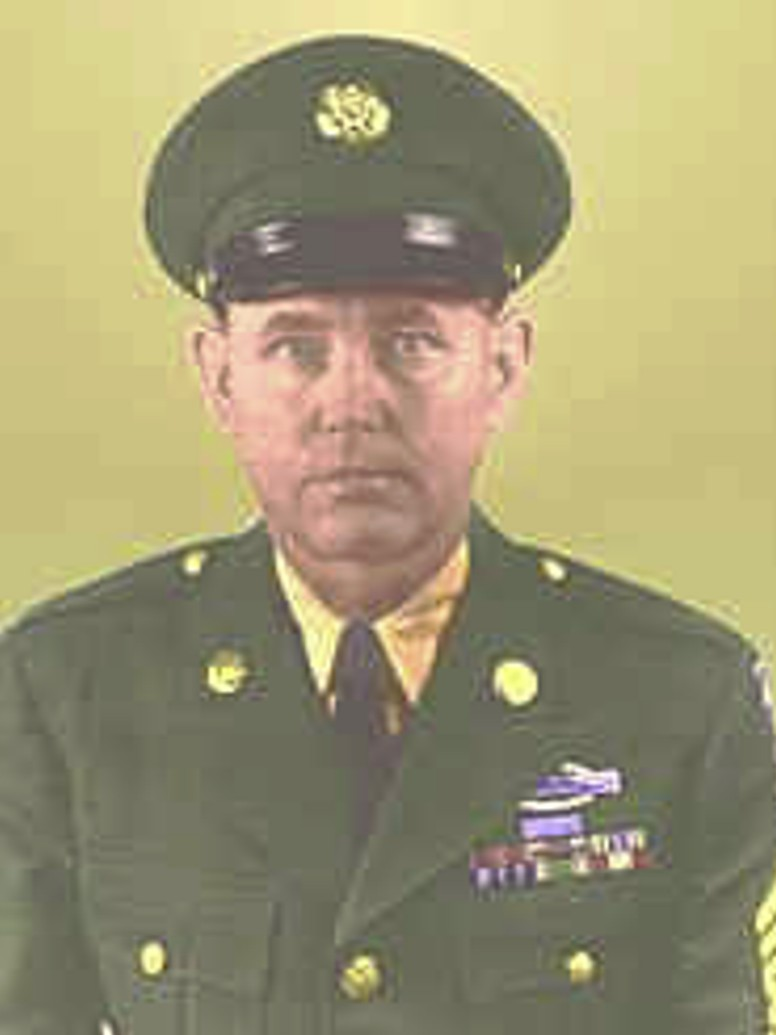
- William J. Crawford, Medal of Honor recipient
- Born: May 19, 1918; Pueblo, Colorado, US
- Died: March 15, 2000 (aged 81); Palmer Lake, Colorado, US
- Burial place: United States Air Force Academy, Colorado Springs, Colorado
- Military career
- Allegiance: United States of America
- Branch: United States Army
- Service years: 1942 – 1945, 1947–1967
- Rank: Master Sergeant
- Nickname: Bill
- Units: 3rd Battalion, 142nd Infantry Regiment, 36th Infantry Division
- Conflicts: World War II
- Awards: Medal of Honor

William John Crawford (May 19, 1918 – March 15, 2000) was a United States Army soldier who received the Medal of Honor for his actions during World War II. The Medal of Honor award was believed to be posthumous, although he was a prisoner of war at the time. He was also a career U.S. Army enlisted soldier, reaching the rank of master sergeant. After retirement from the military, he became a janitor at the United States Air Force Academy, where he received the Medal of Honor award from President Ronald Reagan in 1984.

== Biography ==
Crawford was born on May 19, 1918, in Pueblo, Colorado, and later joined the U.S. Army from that city in July 1942. By September 13, 1943, he was serving as a private with the 142nd Infantry Regiment 36th Infantry Division in southern Italy. On that day, he was acting as a squad scout when his company attacked Hill 424 near Altavilla Silentina. During the battle, Crawford twice moved forward through continuous fire and, using hand grenades and his rifle, destroyed machine gun nests which were holding back his platoon's advance.

After the battle, Crawford was captured by the Germans and presumed dead. So in 1944 the Medal of Honor was presented posthumously to his father. Later in the year, Crawford was among a group of soldiers rescued from German captivity.

On January 13, 1946, he married Eileen Bruce. He re-enlisted in the Army in 1947, retired in 1967 with the rank of master sergeant. He later worked as a janitor at the United States Air Force Academy in Colorado Springs and as director of the Lucretia Vaile Museum in Palmer Lake.

While working at the Air Force Academy, he mentioned to friends that he had never received the Medal from the president. In 1984, during that year's graduation ceremony, President Ronald Reagan formally presented him with the Medal.

Crawford died at age 81 on March 15, 2000, in his residence at Palmer Lake. Upon his death Governor Bill Owens authorized all Colorado flags to be lowered to half staff in his honor. He is buried at the United States Air Force Academy Cemetery in Colorado Springs. He is the only US Army enlisted person buried there.

He is one of four Medal of Honor recipients from Pueblo, Colorado, the others being Drew Dennis Dix, Raymond G. Murphy, and Carl L. Sitter. A bronze statue of Crawford resides at Hero Plaza at the Pueblo Convention Center with the other three Pueblo Medal of Honor statues.

The Crawford House in Colorado Springs was named in his honor.

Anonymous Indigenous Woman with Fairy and Demon Artwork on a Tree Stump at the Crawford House in Colorado Springs, Colorado

== Medal of Honor citation ==
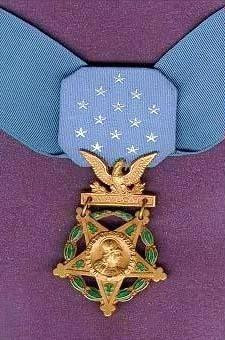

Crawford's official Medal of Honor citation reads:

36th Infantry Division shoulder patch.

For conspicuous gallantry and intrepidity at risk of life above and beyond the call of duty in action with the enemy near Altavilla, Italy, 13 September 1943. When Company I attacked an enemy-held position on Hill 424, the 3rd Platoon, in which Pvt. Crawford was a squad scout, attacked as base platoon for the company. After reaching the crest of the hill, the platoon was pinned down by intense enemy machine-gun and small-arms fire. Locating 1 of these guns, which was dug in on a terrace on his immediate front, Pvt. Crawford, without orders and on his own initiative, moved over the hill under enemy fire to a point within a few yards of the gun emplacement and single-handedly destroyed the machine-gun and killed 3 of the crew with a hand grenade, thus enabling his platoon to continue its advance. When the platoon, after reaching the crest, was once more delayed by enemy fire, Pvt. Crawford again, in the face of intense fire, advanced directly to the front midway between 2 hostile machine-gun nests located on a higher terrace and emplaced in a small ravine. Moving first to the left, with a hand grenade he destroyed 1 gun emplacement and killed the crew; he then worked his way, under continuous fire, to the other and with 1 grenade and the use of his rifle, killed 1 enemy and forced the remainder to flee. Seizing the enemy machine gun, he fired on the withdrawing Germans and facilitated his company's advance.

== Leadership ==
After retiring from the military, Crawford procured a job working as a janitor at the U.S. Air Force Academy. He was not openly eulogized by any of the cadets and staff because he was humble and liked to keep anonymous. "Mr. Crawford" was described as "an unimpressive figure, one you could easily overlook during a hectic day at the U.S. Air Force Academy." Crawford being shy and unassuming did his work well and "blended into the woodwork and became just another fixture around the squadron."

Cadet James Moschgat "was reading a book about World War II and the tough Allied ground campaign in Italy," when he read an incredible story of a private William Crawford who was presumed killed in action and whose father received the Medal of Honor for his son. Unknown to the Army and his family, Crawford had been captured by German soldiers and held as a prisoner of war for nineteen months until the war ended. In that book was a picture of a man who resembled his squadron janitor. Moschgat shared this with the other cadets and confirmed the story with Crawford who replied similar to "Yep, that's me." When asked why he did not talk about it, Crawford said, "That was one day in my life and it happened a long time ago." The word spread with new formed respect for Crawford.

In time, Crawford told his story and things he had learned in life to each academy class. His example also taught them many lessons. These sometimes subtle lessons became of great importance to many of the cadets. Here was a man presumed dead, whose father had received the Medal of Honor for his son from an Army general, then who returned with honor and continued to serve his country and later served them.

After Crawford rejoined the military and throughout his career he reluctantly wore his medal. For over 40 years, Crawford never had a single ceremony or recognition regarding his Medal of Honor award. The cadets at the USAF Academy decided to change this. In 1984, Crawford was a guest of the graduating class. Many past graduates, generals and VIPs attended this graduation. President Ronald Reagan arrived and presented the Medal of Honor to Crawford and formally recognized Crawford's action. In his remarks, President Reagan cited a few leadership lessons they learned from their janitor. Later these lessons were formalized by a former cadet, now COL (Ret.) James E. Moschgat:

Bill Crawford, our janitor, taught me many valuable, unforgettable leadership lessons. Here are ten I'd like to share with you.

- 1. Be Cautious of Labels. Labels you place on people may define your relationship to them and bound their potential. Sadly, and for a long time, we labeled Bill as just a janitor, but he was so much more. Therefore, be cautious of a leader who callously says, "Hey, he's just an Airman". Likewise, don't tolerate the O-1, who says, "I can't do that, I'm just a lieutenant."
- 2. Everyone Deserves Respect. Because we hung the "janitor" label on Mr. Crawford, we often wrongly treated him with less respect than others around us. He deserved much more, and not just because he was a Medal of Honor winner. Bill deserved respect because he was a janitor, walked among us, and was a part of our team.
- 3. Courtesy Makes a Difference. Be courteous to all around you, regardless of rank or position. Military customs, as well as common courtesies, help bond a team. When our daily words to Mr. Crawford turned from perfunctory "hellos" to heartfelt greetings, his demeanor and personality outwardly changed. It made a difference for all of us.
- 4. Take Time to Know Your People. Life in the military is hectic, but that's no excuse for not knowing the people you work for and with. For years a hero walked among us at the Academy and we never knew it. Who are the heroes that walk in your midst?
- 5. Anyone Can Be a Hero. Mr. Crawford certainly didn't fit anyone's standard definition of a hero. Moreover, he was a private on the day he won his Medal. Don't sell your people short, for any one of them may be the hero who rises to the occasion when duty calls. On the other hand, it's easy to turn to your proven performers when the chips are down, but don't ignore the rest of the team. Today's rookie could and should be tomorrow's superstar.
- 6. Leaders Should Be Humble. Most modern day heroes and some leaders are anything but humble, especially if you calibrate your hero meter on today's athletic fields. End zone celebrations and self-aggrandizement are what we've come to expect from sports greats. Not Mr. Crawford-he was too busy working to celebrate his past heroics. Leaders would be well-served to do the same.
- 7. Life Won't Always Hand You What You Think You Deserve. We in the military work hard and, dang it, we deserve recognition, right? However, sometimes you just have to persevere, even when accolades don't come your way. Perhaps you weren't nominated for junior officer or airman of the quarter as you thought you should; don't let that stop you.
- 8. Don't pursue glory; pursue excellence. Private Bill Crawford didn't pursue glory; he did his duty and then swept floors for a living.
- 9. No job is beneath a Leader. If Bill Crawford, a Medal of Honor winner, could clean latrines and smile, is there a job beneath your dignity? Think about it. Pursue Excellence. No matter what task life hands you, do it well. Dr. Martin Luther King said, "If life makes you a street sweeper, be the best street sweeper you can be." Mr. Crawford modeled that philosophy and helped make our dormitory area a home.
- 10. Life is a Leadership Laboratory. All too often we look to some school or PME class to teach us about leadership when, in fact, life is a leadership laboratory. Those you meet everyday will teach you enduring lessons if you just take time to stop, look and listen. I spent four years at the Air Force Academy, took dozens of classes, read hundreds of books, and met thousands of great people. I gleaned leadership skills from all of them, but one of the people I remember most is Mr. Bill Crawford and the lessons he unknowingly taught. Don't miss your opportunity to learn.

Bill Crawford was a janitor. However, he was also a teacher, friend, role model and one great American hero. Thanks, Mr. Crawford, for some valuable leadership lessons.

== Awards and decorations ==

Combat Infantryman Badge
Medal of Honor	Bronze Star	Army Commendation Medal
Prisoner of War Medal	Army Good Conduct Medal	American Campaign Medal
European–African–Middle Eastern Campaign Medal with 1 campaign star and arrowhead device	World War II Victory Medal	National Defense Service Medal with 1 bronze service star

== See also ==
- List of Medal of Honor recipients for World War II
- Home of Heroes – William J. Crawford – includes older image.
