= Veterans' Memorial Bridge =

Veterans' Memorial Bridge may refer to:

== United States ==
- Veterans Memorial Bridge (Bay City, Michigan)
- Veterans Memorial Bridge (Chattanooga), in Tennessee
- Veterans Memorial Bridge (Neches River), connecting Port Arthur and Bridge City, Texas
- Veteran's Memorial Bridge (Portland, Maine)
- Siouxland Veterans Memorial Bridge, connecting Sioux City, Iowa, and South Sioux City, Nebraska
- Smith County Veterans Memorial Bridge, connecting Carthage and South Carthage, Tennessee
- South Omaha Veterans Memorial Bridge, connecting Nebraska and Iowa
- World War II Veterans Memorial Bridge (Virginia)
- Yadkin River Veterans Memorial Bridge, twin bridges (one complete) in North Carolina
- Gramercy Bridge, in Gramercy, Louisiana, officially known as the Veterans Memorial Bridge

=== Florida ===
- Veterans Memorial Bridge (Daytona Beach), which carries County Road 4050 traffic
- Veterans Memorial Bridge (Tallahassee), in Florida
- St. Johns River Veterans Memorial Bridge, connecting Sanford FL and DeBary FL

=== Massachusetts ===
- Veterans Memorial Bridge (Bristol County, Massachusetts), which connects Fall River and Somerset, Massachusetts
- Veterans Memorial Bridge (Essex County, Massachusetts), Salem and Beverly, Massachusetts

=== Missouri ===
- Veterans Memorial Bridge (Missouri), twin bridges crossing the Missouri River in the St. Louis metropolitan area
- Martin Luther King Bridge (St. Louis), Missouri, formerly known as the Veterans Memorial Bridge
- Stan Musial Veterans Memorial Bridge, carrying Interstate 70 across the Mississippi River at St. Louis

=== New York ===
- Veterans Memorial Bridge (Rochester, New York)
- Cross Bay Veterans Memorial Bridge in New York, New York
- Walden Veterans' Memorial Bridge in Walden, New York

=== Ohio ===
- Veterans Memorial Bridge (Steubenville, Ohio), connecting Steubenville to Weirton, WV
- Detroit–Superior Bridge in Cleveland, Ohio, officially known as the Veterans Memorial Bridge

=== Pennsylvania ===
- Veterans Memorial Bridge (Oil City, Pennsylvania)
- Veterans Memorial Bridge (Sunbury, Pennsylvania), to Shamokin Dam, Pennsylvania
- Columbia-Wrightsville Bridge, Columbia and Wrightsville, Pennsylvania

=== Wisconsin ===
- Veterans Memorial Bridge (Kaukauna, Wisconsin)

== See also ==
- Veterans Bridge (disambiguation)
- Midpoint Memorial Bridge, in Fort Myers, Florida, which carries Veterans Memorial Parkway
