= Historic Arkansas Riverwalk =

In Pueblo, Colorado, along the Arkansas River

Coordinates: 38°15′55″N 104°36′44″W

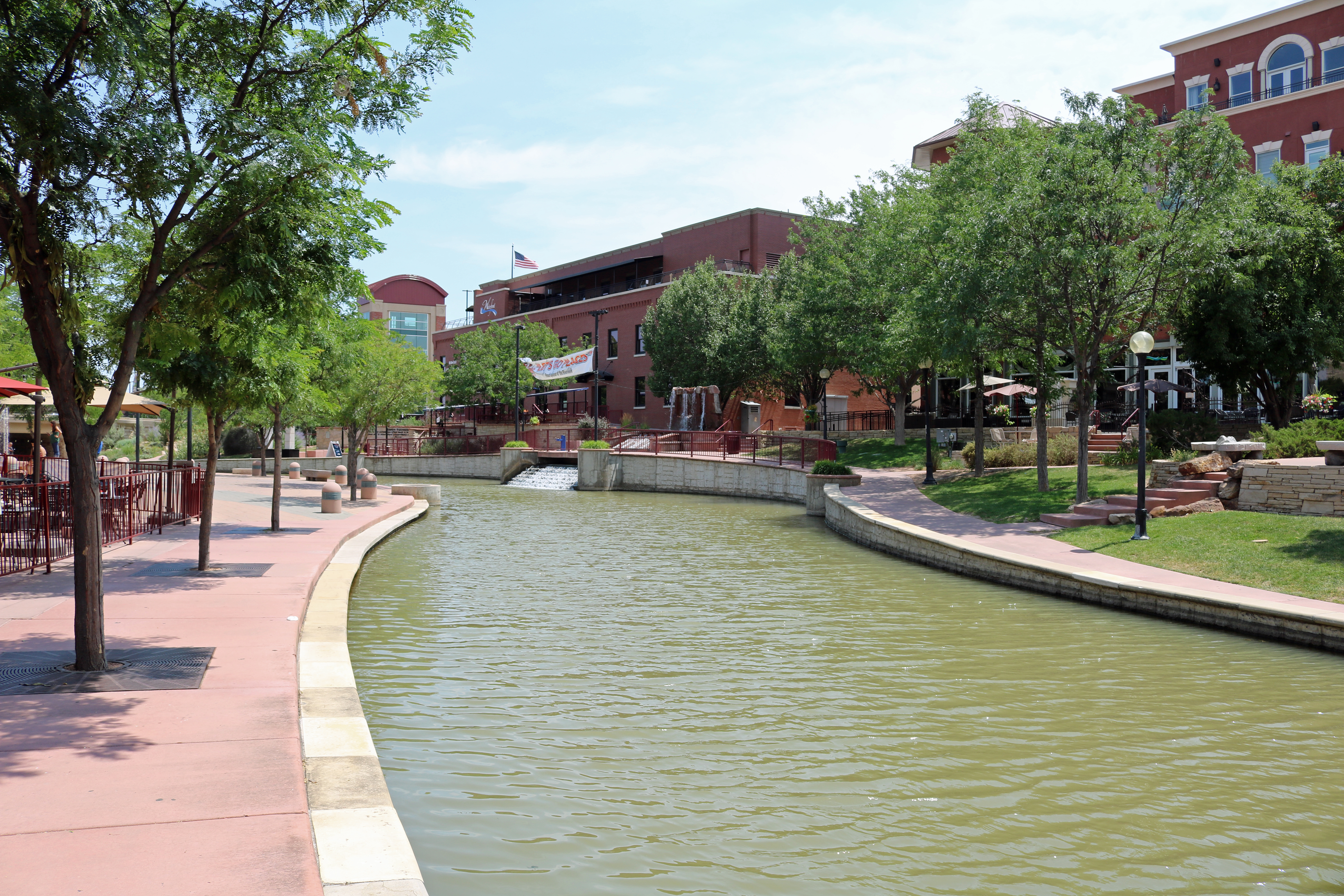
Along the Pueblo Riverwalk

The Historic Arkansas Riverwalk is a 32-acre urban waterfront area in the city of Pueblo, Colorado, with 1.2 mile loop trail along the Arkansas River. The riverwalk was constructed as part of an effort to attract tourists and trade to the city. The riverwalk features history about the Pueblo Flood of 1921, and also hosts recreation and restaurants.

== History ==
Before the Pueblo Flood of 1921, the Arkansas River ran through the middle of the Union Avenue Historic Commercial District. But after the flood, the river had to be rerouted to south of the city for prevention of future floods. Plans for a riverwalk in town first started in 1991, when a group of citizens became interested in building a riverwalk styled after the San Antonio Riverwalk. In 1993, the City of Pueblo created the HARP Commission to help design and fund the project. Major goals with the project include beautifying the city for tourists and citizens, and getting Pueblo out of an economic slump. On October 6, 2000, the riverwalk opened to the public, and in later years having multiple additions such as the nearby Gateway Park which was completed in 2006, or the Veterans Bridge which was completed in 2010. Since its opening in the center of town, it has boosted tourism to the city, and the economy as well.
