= Raymond G. Murphy =

United States Marine Corps Medal of Honor recipient (1930–2007)

Raymond Gerald Murphy
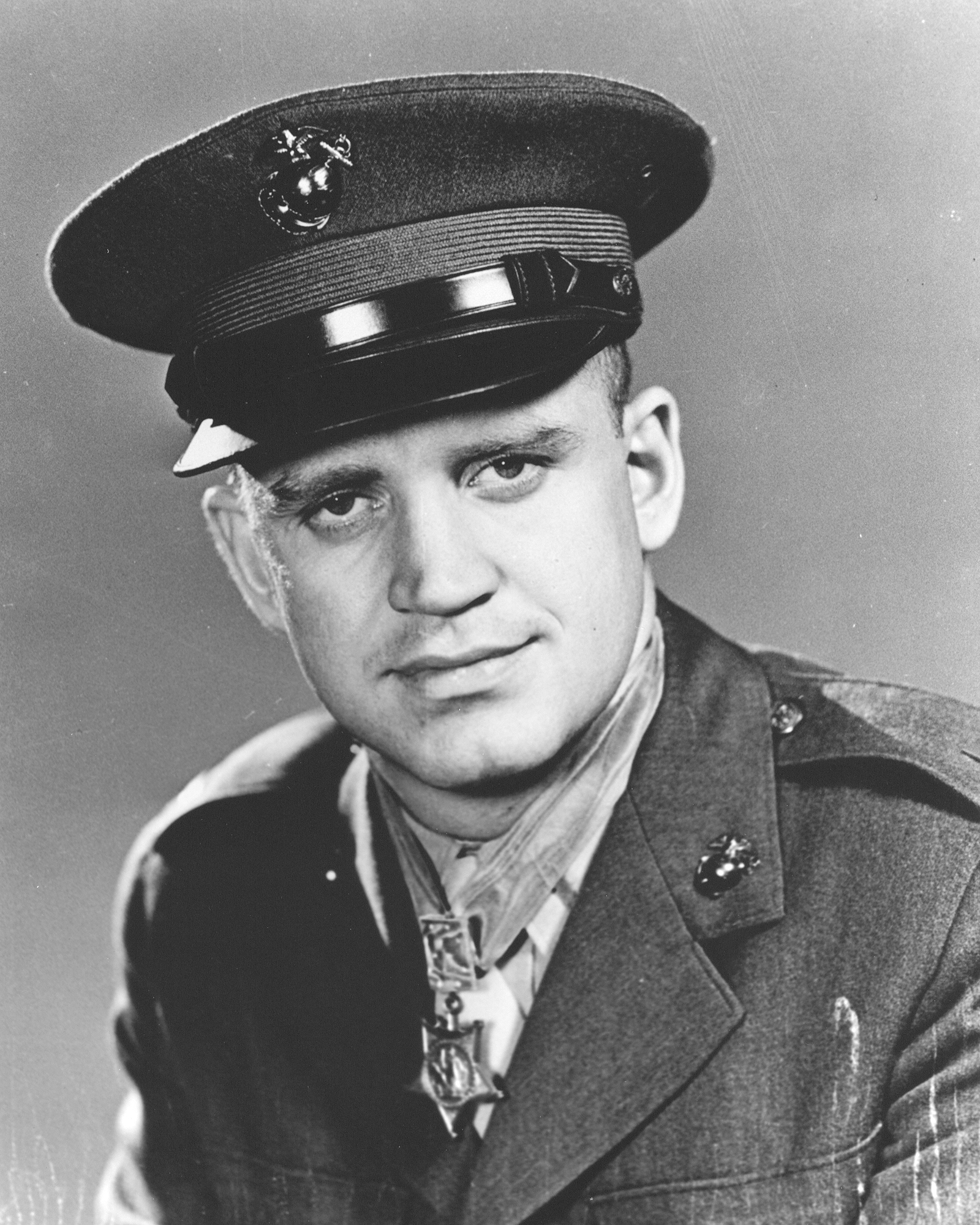
- Raymond G. Murphy, Medal of Honor recipient
- Born: January 14, 1930; Pueblo, Colorado
- Died: April 6, 2007 (aged 77); Pueblo, Colorado
- Burial place: Santa Fe National Cemetery; Santa Fe, New Mexico
- Military career
- Allegiance: United States of America
- Branch: United States Marine Corps
- Service years: 1951–1959
- Rank: Captain
- Nickname: "Jerry"
- Unit: 1st Battalion, 5th Marines
- Conflicts: Korean War
- Awards: Medal of Honor; Silver Star; Purple Heart Medal; Combat Action Ribbon
- Other work: Veterans Administration, counselor

Captain Raymond Gerald "Jerry" Murphy (January 14, 1930 – April 6, 2007) was the 39th United States Marine to receive the Medal of Honor for heroism in the Korean War. He was decorated by President Dwight D. Eisenhower in a White House ceremony on October 27, 1953. He earned the Nation's highest military decoration for heroic action for valor in the Reno-Vegas fighting of February 1953.

== Biography ==
Raymond Gerald Murphy was born in Pueblo, Colorado, on January 14, 1930, to Thomas and Mame Murphy. He graduated from Pueblo Catholic High School in 1947. He attended Fort Lewis Junior College in Durango, Colorado, for two years before transferring to Adams State College in Alamosa, Colorado. While in college, he played varsity football, basketball, & baseball, and worked as a swimming instructor in Durango in the summer of 1950. In 1951, Murphy graduated from Adams State College with a degree in physical education. He joined the Marine Corps Reserve in May 1951 and entered Officers Candidate School at Parris Island, South Carolina, the following month.

Commissioned a second lieutenant in September 1951, he was then ordered to Officers' Basic School at Quantico, Virginia. Completing the course the following February, he was transferred to Camp Pendleton, California, for advanced training before embarking for Korea in July 1952. In Korea, Second Lieutenant Murphy served with the 5th Marines, 1st Marine Division until he was wounded in the action where he earned the Medal of Honor. After treatment aboard the Danish hospital ship Jutlandia, the American hospital ship USS Repose, and later in Japan, he was returned to the U. S. Naval Hospital, Mare Island, California, in March 1953. He was promoted to first lieutenant that same month.

He returned to Pueblo after his discharge from the hospital and was released from active duty April 7, 1953. On October 27, President Dwight Eisenhower presented Murphy and six others with the Medal of Honor during a ceremony at the White House. He is one of four Medal of Honor recipients from Pueblo, Colorado, the others being William J. Crawford, Drew Dennis Dix, and Carl L. Sitter. Murphy was promoted to captain on December 31, 1954, and discharged from the Marine Corps Reserve five years later on December 28, 1959.

After the war, Murphy moved to New Mexico. From 1974 until his retirement, he worked as a counselor for the Veterans Administration and became the Chief of Veterans Services. After retiring from the VA Jerry stayed on as a volunteer at the hospital until 2005. He and his wife, Maryann, raised three sons, John, Tim, and Michael, and a daughter, Eleanor.

Murphy died on April 6, 2007, in the Veterans Administration Nursing Home in Pueblo at age 77, after a long illness. He was buried at Santa Fe National Cemetery in Santa Fe, New Mexico.

Prior to his death, a bill was introduced in the U.S. Senate to name the Veterans' hospital in Albuquerque the Raymond G. Murphy Department of Veterans Affairs Medical Center. The bill was passed by both houses of Congress and signed by President Bush on July 5, 2007.

== Citations ==
=== Medal of Honor citation ===

The President of the United States in the name of The Congress takes pleasure in presenting the Medal of Honor to SECOND LIEUTENANT RAYMOND G. MURPHY
UNITED STATES MARINE CORPS for service as set forth in the following

CITATION:

For conspicuous gallantry and intrepidity at the risk of his life above and beyond the call of duty as a Platoon Commander of Company A, First Battalion, Fifth Marines, First Marine Division (Reinforced), in action against enemy aggressor forces in Korea on February 3, 1953. Although painfully wounded by fragments from an enemy mortar shell while leading his evacuation platoon in support of assault units attacking a cleverly concealed and well-entrenched hostile force occupying commanding ground, Second Lieutenant MURPHY steadfastly refused medical aid and continued to lead his men up a hill through a withering barrage of hostile mortar and small-arms fire, skillfully maneuvering his force from one position to the next and shouting words of encouragement. Undeterred by the increasing intense enemy fire, he immediately located casualties as they fell and made several trips up and down the fire-swept hill to direct evacuation teams to the wounded, personally carrying many of the stricken Marines to safety. When reinforcements were needed by the assaulting elements, Second Lieutenant MURPHY employed part of his Unit as support and, during the ensuing battle, personally killed two of the enemy with his pistol. When all the wounded evacuated and the assaulting units beginning to disengage, he remained behind with a carbine to cover the movement of friendly forces off the hill and, though suffering intense pain from his previous wounds, seized an automatic rifle to provide more firepower when the enemy reappeared in the trenches. After reaching the base of the hill, he organized a search party and again ascended the slope for a final check on missing Marines, locating and carrying the bodies of a machine-gun crew back down the hill. Wounded a second time while conducting the entire force to the line of departure through a continuing barrage of enemy small-arms, artillery and mortar fire, he again refused medical assistance until assured that every one of his men, including all casualties, had preceded him to the main lines. His resolute and inspiring leadership, exceptional fortitude and great personal valor reflect the highest credit upon Second Lieutenant MURPHY and enhance the finest traditions of the United States Naval Service.

/S/ DWIGHT D. EISENHOWER

=== Silver Star citation ===
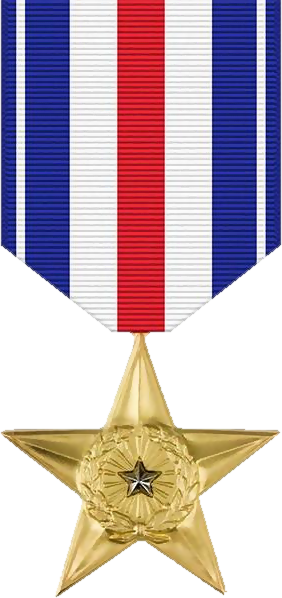

Citation:

The President of the United States of America takes pleasure in presenting the Silver Star to Second Lieutenant Raymond Gerald Murphy (MCSN: 0-54837), United States Marine Corps, for conspicuous gallantry and intrepidity as a Platoon Commander of Company A, First Battalion, Fifth Marines, FIRST Marine Division (Reinforced), in action against enemy aggressor forces in Korea on 22 November 1952. Assigned the extremely hazardous mission of assaulting a strong point of the enemy main line of resistance, Second Lieutenant Murphy courageously exposed himself to devastating enemy mortar and artillery fire to press the assault on the objective. On three separate occasions, when the enemy attempted to prevent him from accomplishing his mission, he skillfully coordinated and utilized supporting arms to repulse the foe. Although the platoon suffered severe casualties by the time the objective was reached, the unit succeeded in evacuating the wounded in the face of continuous enemy fire. Upon successful completion of the mission, he ordered the withdrawal and personally remained behind until assured that all of his men had withdrawn. By his outstanding courage, superb leadership and indomitable spirit, Second Lieutenant Murphy served to inspire all who observed him and upheld the highest traditions of the United States Naval Service.

== Awards and Decorations ==

1st row	Medal of Honor		
2nd row	Silver Star	Purple Heart	Combat Action Ribbon Retroactively Awarded, 1999
3rd row	Navy Unit Commendation	National Defense Service Medal	Korean Service Medal with 2 Campaign stars
4th row	Korean Presidential Unit Citation	United Nations Service Medal Korea	Korean War Service Medal Retroactively Awarded, 2003

== See also ==
- List of Korean War Medal of Honor recipients
