= Carl L. Sitter =

United States Marine Corps officer

Carl Leonard Sitter
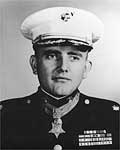
- Born: December 2, 1922; Syracuse, Missouri, U.S.
- Died: April 4, 2000 (aged 77); Richmond, Virginia, U.S.
- Burial place: Arlington National Cemetery
- Military career
- Allegiance: United States
- Branch: United States Marine Corps
- Service years: 1940–1970
- Rank: Colonel
- Conflicts: World War II: Battle of Eniwetok; Battle of Guam; Korean War: Battle of Inchon; Battle of Chosin Reservoir
- Awards: Medal of Honor; Silver Star; Legion of Merit; Purple Heart (4)
- Other work: Virginia Department of Social Services

Carl Leonard Sitter (December 2, 1922 – April 4, 2000) was a highly decorated United States Marine Corps officer and Korean War Medal of Honor recipient for his actions during the Battle of Chosin Reservoir.

== Marine Corps career ==
He was born in Syracuse, Missouri, but grew up in Pueblo, Colorado. Upon graduating from Central High School, he enlisted in the United States Marine Corps on June 22, 1940. He served for eight months in Iceland, then was ordered to the Pacific area. He was serving as a corporal in the Wallis Islands when, on December 12, 1942, he was given a field commission as a second lieutenant in the Marine Corps Reserve.

Sitter saw combat on Eniwetok in the Marshall Islands, and Guam in the Marianas. He was first wounded on February 20, 1944, on Eniwetok, but went back into action almost immediately.

He was wounded again the following July on Guam, during the action in which he earned the Silver Star. The situation was similar, though on a smaller scale, to the one in which he earned the Medal of Honor: he exposed himself to enemy fire to lead his rifle platoon, and when wounded refused to be evacuated until his mission was accomplished.

Captain Sitter was awarded the Medal of Honor for leadership during a two-day battle at Hagaru-ri, Korea during the Battle of Chosin Reservoir. In the bitter fighting between the Chinese and the surrounded US forces near the Chosin Reservoir in November 1950, Captain Sitter was wounded by hand grenades, but continued to lead his men until he repulsed a counterattack. He is one of four Medal of Honor recipients from Pueblo, Colorado, the others being William J. Crawford, Drew Dennis Dix, and Raymond G. Murphy.

He retired from active duty on June 30, 1970, after reaching the rank of colonel in the Marine Corps.

== Post-Marine Corps career ==
After 30 years in the Marine Corps, Sitter went to work for the Virginia Department of Social Services. He retired in 1985 at age 63.

In 1998, at age 75, Sitter returned to college, graduating on May 28, 1999, at age 76.

Sitter died in Richmond, Virginia, and is buried in Arlington National Cemetery, Arlington, Virginia.

== Citations ==
=== Medal of Honor citation ===

The President of the United States takes pride in presenting the MEDAL OF HONOR to

CAPTAIN CARL L. SITTER
UNITED STATES MARINE CORPS

for service as set forth in the following CITATION:

For conspicuous gallantry and intrepidity at the risk of his life above and beyond the call of duty as Commanding Officer of Company G, Third Battalion, First Marines, First Marine Division (Reinforced), in action against enemy aggressor forces at Hagaru-ri, Korea, on 29 and November 30, 1950. Ordered to break through enemy-infested territory to reinforce his Battalion the early morning of November 29, Captain Sitter continuously exposed himself to enemy fire as he led his company forward and, despite twenty-five percent casualties suffered in the furious action, succeeded in driving through to his objective. Assuming the responsibility of attempting to seize and occupy a strategic area occupied by a hostile force of regiment strength deeply entrenched on a snow-covered hill commanding the entire valley southeast of the town, as well as the line of march of friendly troops withdrawing to the south, he reorganized his depleted units the following morning and boldly led them up the steep, frozen hillside under blistering fire, encouraging and redeploying his troops as casualties occurred and directing forward platoons as they continued the drive to the top of the ridge. During the night when a vastly outnumbering enemy launched a sudden, vicious counterattack, setting the hill ablaze with mortar, machine-gun, and automatic weapons fire and taking a heavy toll in troops, Captain Sitter visited each foxhole and gun position, coolly deploying and integrating reinforcing units consisting of service personnel unfamiliar with infantry tactics into a coordinated combat team and instilling in every man the will and determination to hold his position at all costs. With the enemy penetrating his lines in repeated counterattacks which often required hand-to-hand combat and, on one occasion infiltrating to the command post with hand grenades, he fought gallantly with his men in repulsing and killing the fanatic attackers in each encounter. Painfully wounded in the face, arms and chest by bursting grenades, he staunchly refused to be evacuated and continued to fight on until a successful defense of the area was assured with a loss to the enemy of more than fifty percent dead, wounded and captured. His valiant leadership, superb tactics and great personal valor throughout thirty-six hours of bitter combat reflect the highest credit upon Captain Sitter, and the United States Naval Service.

/S/ HARRY S. TRUMAN

=== Silver Star citation ===
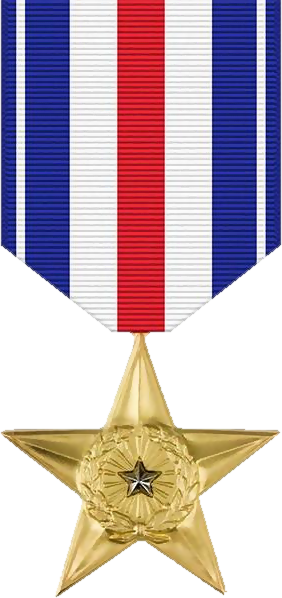

Citation:

The President of the United States of America takes pleasure in presenting the Silver Star to First Lieutenant Carl Leonard Sitter (MCSN: 0-16377), United States Marine Corps, for conspicuous gallantry and intrepidity in action against the enemy while serving as platoon leader of a rifle platoon on Guam, Marianas Islands, during the period 21 July to 28 July 1944. Lieutenant Sitter, leading his platoon into combat under the most adverse conditions, constantly subjected himself to intense enemy rifle, machine gun, and mortar fire, without regard for his personal safety, so that he could personally direct the fire and tactical disposition of his troops. While so leading his troops, Lieutenant Sitter was wounded in the right leg. In spite of his severe and painful wound, he refused to be evacuated, stayed with his troops, and continued to press forward the attack with skill and vigor. Three days later when his platoon was again assaulting an enemy position against fierce and desperate resistance, Lieutenant Sitter was so seriously wounded in his left arm that it necessitated his immediate evacuation. His skill, initiative, and determination contributed materially to the successful accomplishment of his battalion's mission. His courageous leadership was an inspiration to all those serving with him and was in keeping with the highest traditions of the United States Naval Service.

== Awards and Decorations ==

1st row	Medal of Honor		Silver Star
2nd row	Legion of Merit	Purple Heart with 3 5/16 inch stars	Combat Action Ribbon with 5/16 inch star
	Navy Presidential Unit Citation with 1 Service star	Navy Unit Commendation with 2 Service stars	Marine Corps Good Conduct Medal
	American Defense Service Medal with 'Foreign Service' clasp	American Campaign Medal	Asiatic-Pacific Campaign Medal with 2 Campaign stars
3rd row	World War II Victory Medal	National Defense Service Medal	Korean Service Medal with 3 Campaign stars
4th row	Korean Presidential Unit Citation	United Nations Service Medal Korea	Korean War Service Medal Retroactively Awarded, 2003

Order of Military Merit

Chungmu Cordon Medal

== See also ==
- List of Medal of Honor recipients
