= Warren C. Dockum =

- Born: January 1, 1844; Clintonville, New York
- Died: October 2, 1921 (aged 77); Pueblo, Colorado
- Burial place: Pueblo, Colorado
- Military career
- Allegiance: United States of America
- Branch: United States Army
- Rank: Private
- Unit: (New York (state)) 121st New York Volunteer Infantry Regiment - Company H
- Awards: Medal of Honor

Private Warren C. Dockum (January 1, 1844 – October 2, 1921) was an American soldier who fought in the American Civil War. Dockum received the United States' highest award for bravery during combat, the Medal of Honor, for his action during the Battle of Sayler's Creek in Virginia on 6 April 1865. He was honored with the award on 10 May 1865.

== Biography ==
Dockum was born in Clintonville, New York on 1 January 1844. He enlisted into the 121st New York Infantry. He died on 2 October 1921, and his remains are interred at the Roselawn Cemetery in Pueblo, Colorado.

== Medal of Honor citation ==
Capture of flag of Savannah Guards (Confederate States of America), after 2 other men had been killed in the effort.

== See also ==
- List of American Civil War Medal of Honor recipients: A–F
