= Veterans' Bridge (Pueblo) =

Coordinates: 38°15′55″N 104°36′34″W

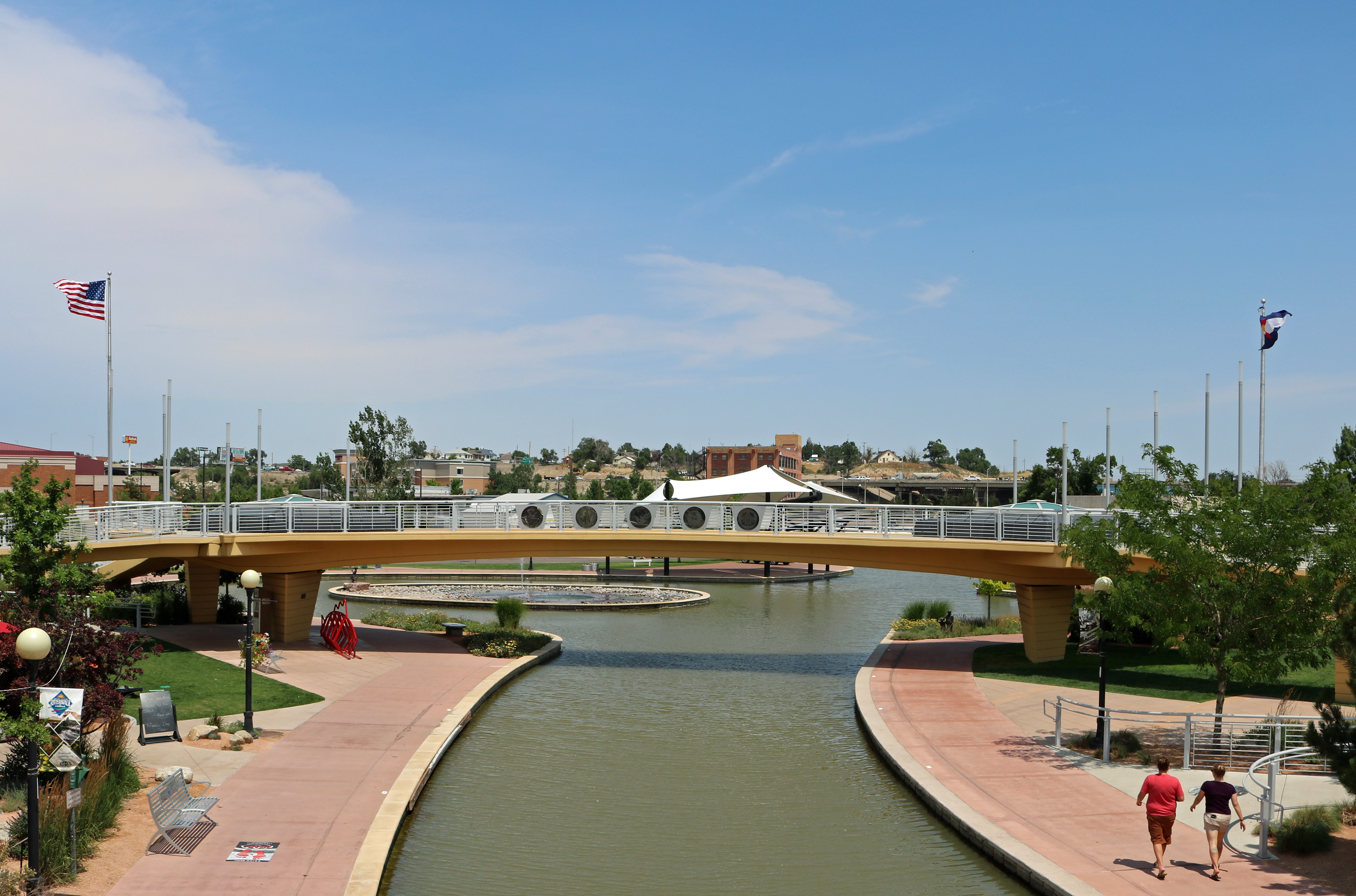
The bridge in 2017.

Veterans' Bridge is a $1.5 million pedestrian footbridge and monument honoring all veterans (usually those who have ties to Pueblo, Colorado) regardless of branch of military service or whether they served in peace time or war. The bridge — located on the Historic Arkansas Riverwalk of Pueblo — was formally opened and dedicated to the public on Veterans Day, November 11, 2010.

== Overview ==
Upon completion of construction in October 2010, eight granite plaques were placed on top of two large pyramids that are located on the walking area of the bridge. Engravings of approximately 5,800 veterans will be placed upon these pieces of granite. When the bridge was opened in 2010, it was then filled to approximately 5,000 names. According to HARP Authority members, a rush for several hundred names came immediately following the dedication.

== Dedication ==
Veteran's Bridge was opened during a grand ceremony on Veterans Day 2010. 5,000 supporters filled the streets of downtown Pueblo to help welcome this new monument.
