= Union Depot (Pueblo, Colorado) =

- U.S. National Register of Historic Places
- U.S. Historic district – Contributing property
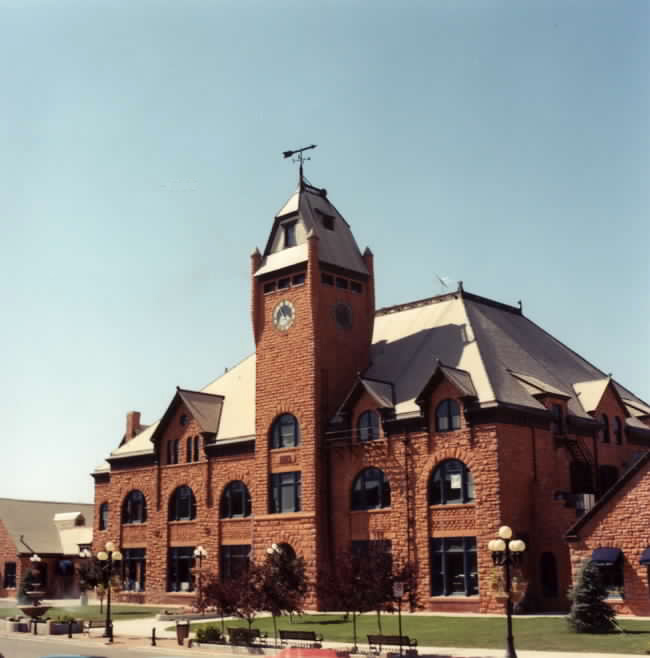

- Location within Colorado Location within the United States
- Location: Victoria Avenue and B Street; Pueblo, Colorado
- Coordinates: 38.2630°N 104.6173°W
- Built: 1889–1890
- Architect: Sprague & Newell
- Architectural style: Richardsonian Romanesque
- Part of: Union Avenue Historic Commercial District (ID82001021)
- NRHP reference No.: 75000535

Pueblo Union Depot is the historic railroad station in Pueblo, Colorado. It was built in the Richardsonian Romanesque style in 1889–1890 and added to the National Register of Historic Places in 1975. It is located within the Union Avenue Historic Commercial District.

== History ==
Initially the station was served by the Denver & Rio Grande Western Railroad, the Atchison, Topeka and Santa Fe Railway, the Colorado & Southern Railway (which was acquired by the Chicago, Burlington and Quincy Railroad in 1908), the Missouri Pacific Railroad, and the Chicago Rock Island & Pacific Railroad. Today the Union Pacific Railroad and the BNSF Railroad share use of the tracks, and the depot is privately owned. Regular passenger train service no longer exists, though there are proposals such as Front Range Passenger Rail, which would provide service to Denver and Colorado Springs. In addition, the depot has been proposed to operate on Amtrak's Southwest Chief.

Presidents Theodore Roosevelt and Woodrow Wilson arrived at the depot, as did vice-presidential candidate Joe Biden and presidential candidate John Kerry.

| Preceding station | Atchison, Topeka and Santa Fe Railway | Following station |
|---|---|---|
| Bragdon toward Denver | Denver Branch | Baxter toward La Junta |
| Preceding station | Burlington Route | Following station |
| Bragdon toward Denver | Denver – Teague Colorado and Southern Railway | Furman toward Teague |
| Preceding station | Denver and Rio Grande Western Railroad | Following station |
| Swallows toward Ogden | Royal Gorge Route | Eden toward Denver |
| Preceding station | Missouri Pacific Railroad | Following station |
| Terminus | Pueblo – Kansas City | Baxter toward Kansas City |
