= Quaker Flour Mill =

- U.S. National Register of Historic Places
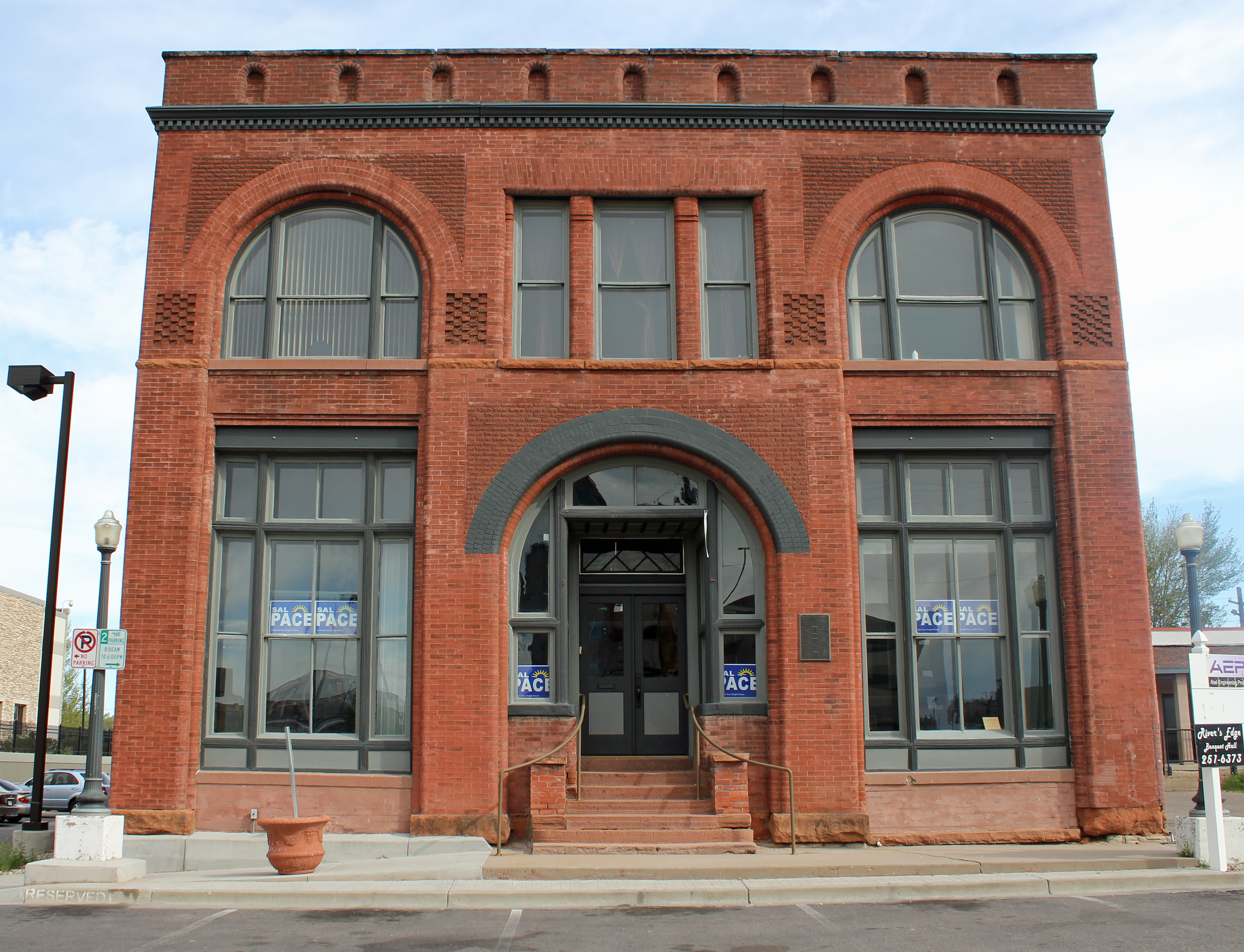

- Location within Colorado Location within the United States
- Location: 102 S. Oneida St., Pueblo, Colorado
- Coordinates: 38°15′45″N 104°36′32″W
- Area: less than one acre
- Built: 1869
- NRHP reference No.: 76000568
- Added to NRHP: September 30, 1976

The Quaker Flour Mill, also known as Show Room , is a historic building in Pueblo, Colorado. The building once served as a flour mill and in 1976 it was a theatre. It was listed on the National Register of Historic Places in 1976.

Its original portion, built in 1869, is the oldest building in Pueblo. It was used first by the Quaker Flour Mill, and, from 1879, by the South Pueblo Flour Mill. In about 1890 it was bought by the Joseph Schlitz Brewing Co. which operated it to bottle and distribute beer, up to the Prohibition.

It was built as a four-story building with sandstone block walls 30 inches (0.76 m) thick. In 1890 the fourth floor and the gable roof were removed and a two-story brick section was added at the front. A one-story extension to the rear was added in 1927.
