= Pueblo, Colorado =

Home rule city and seat of Pueblo County, Colorado, United States

- Home rule city
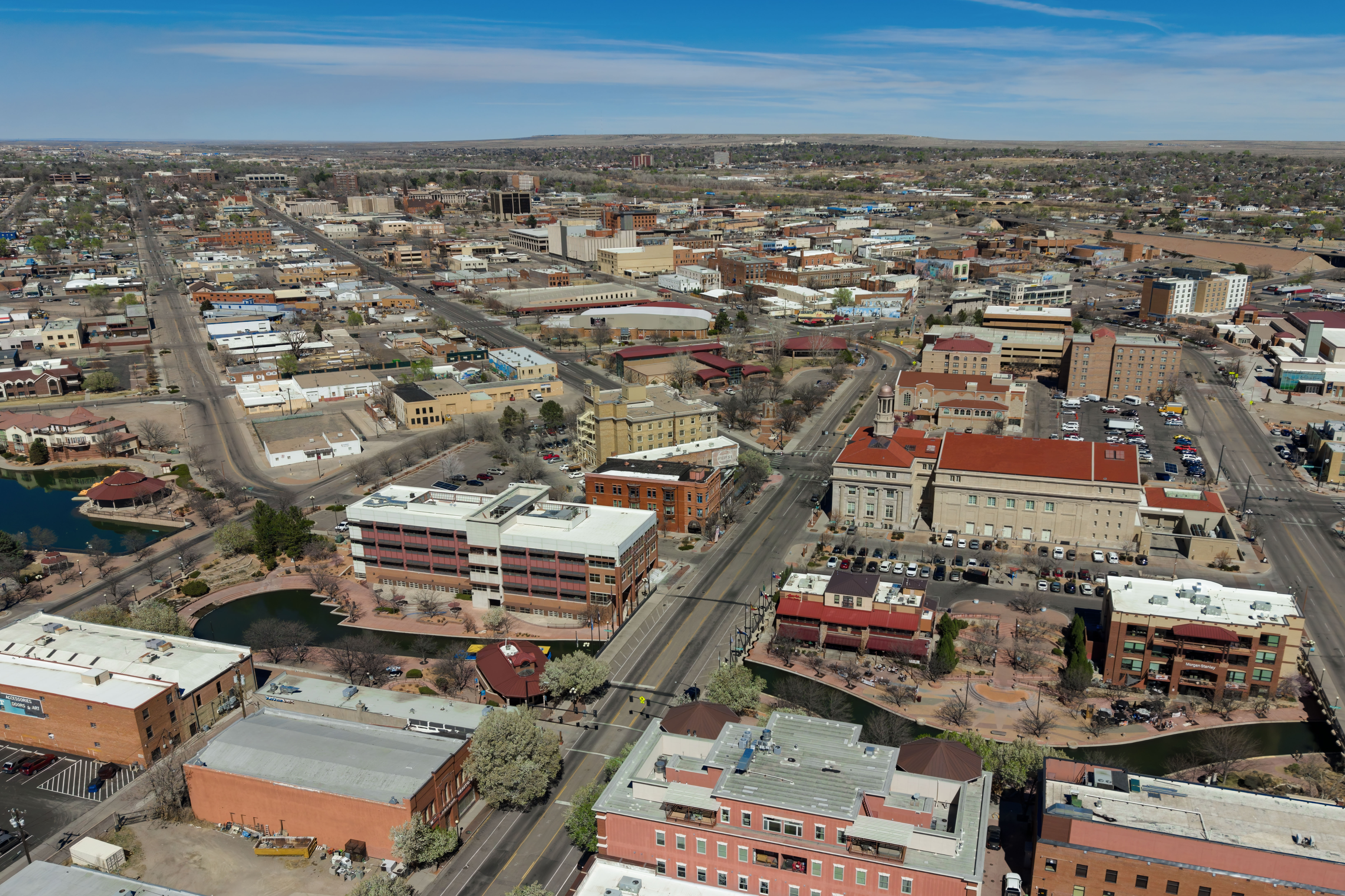
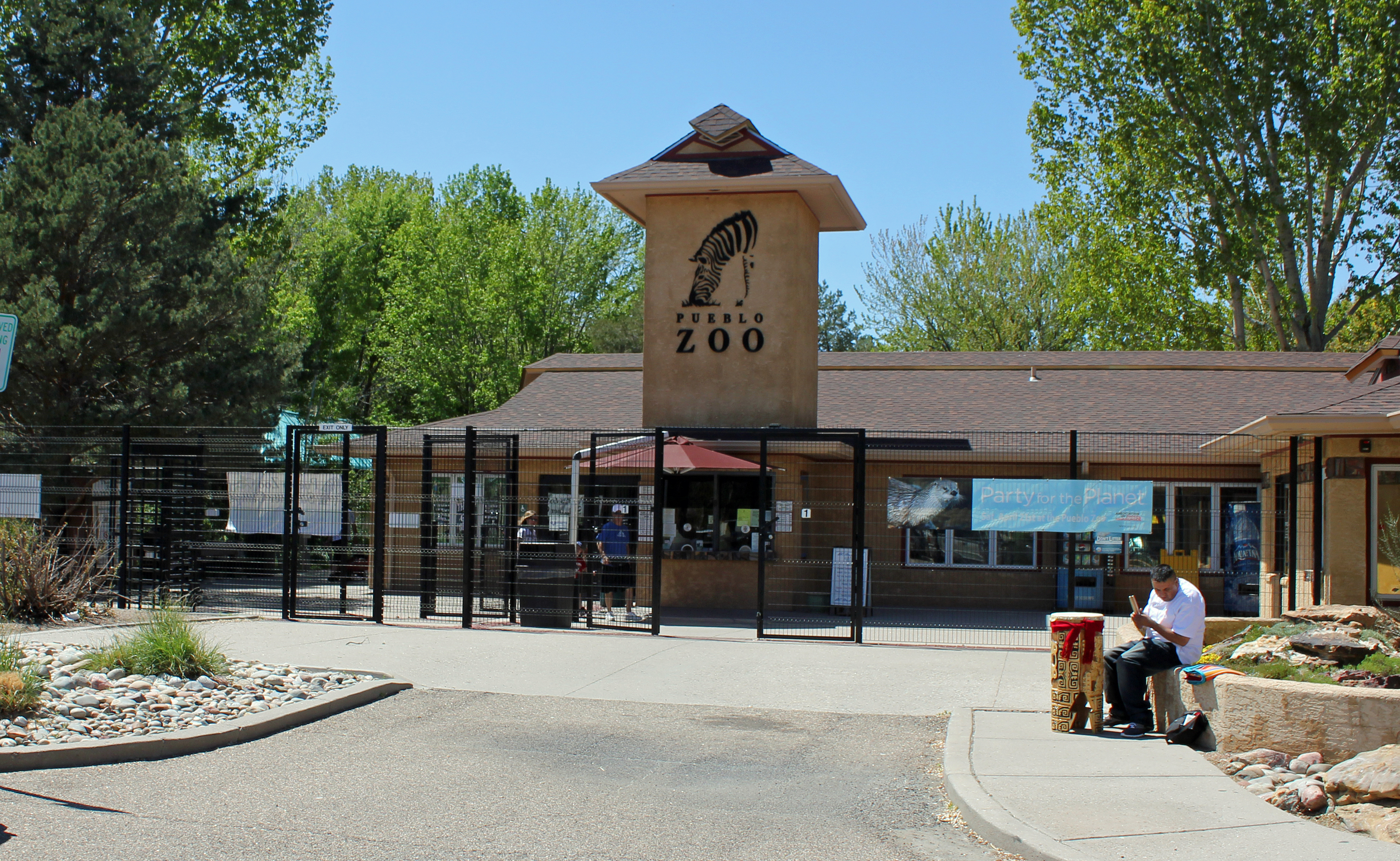
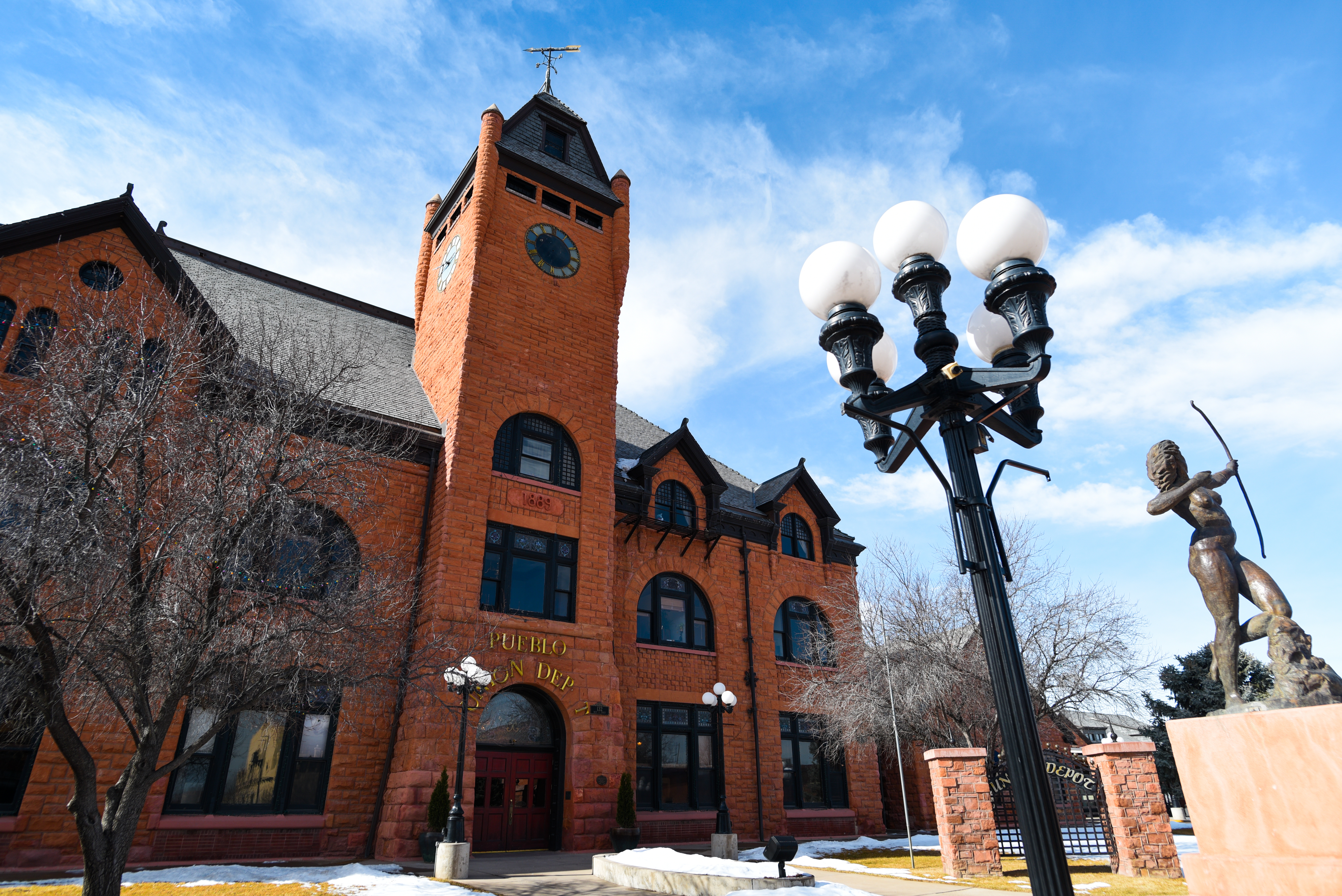
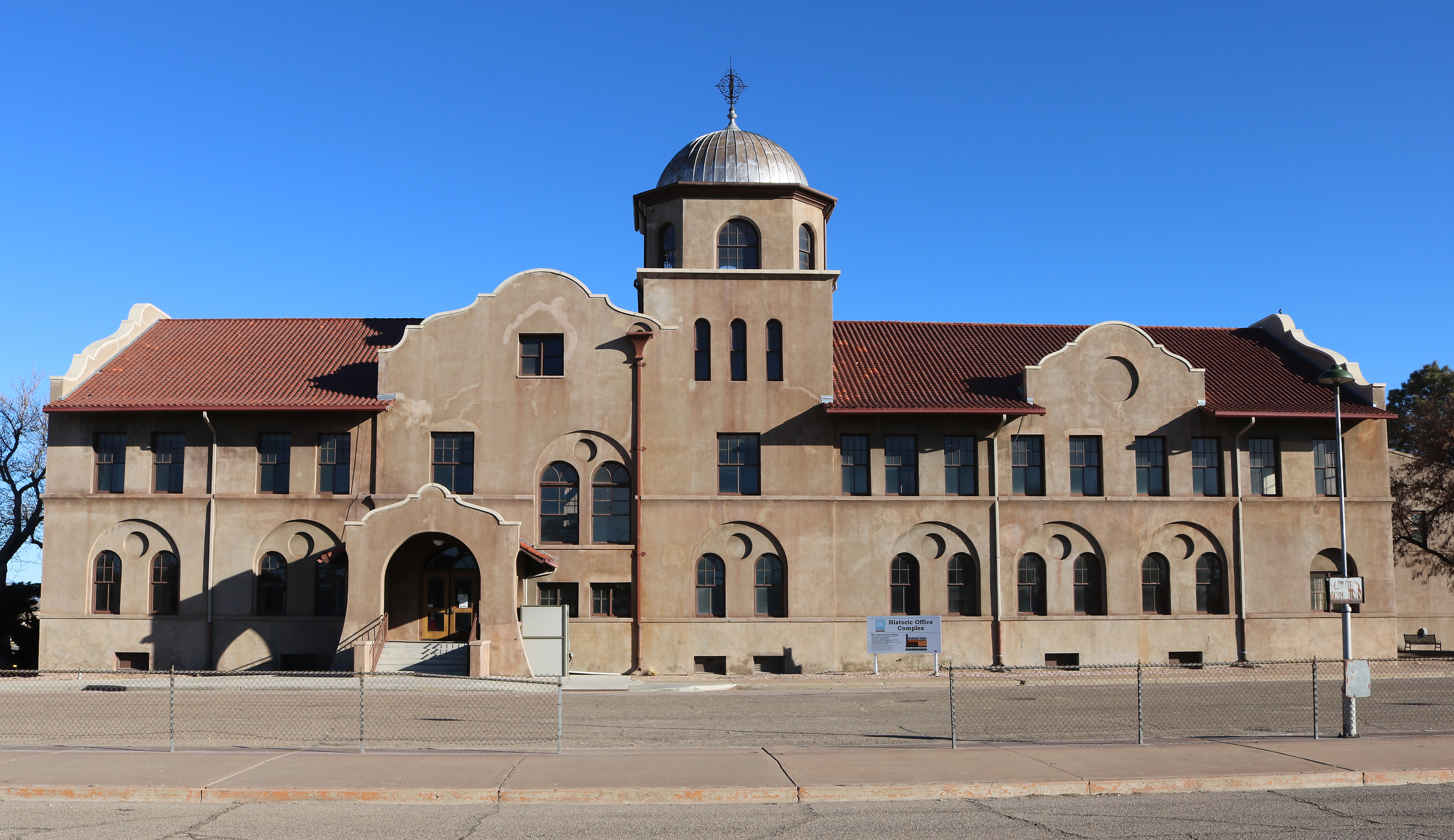
- View of downtown and the Historic Arkansas Riverwalk Pueblo Zoo Pueblo Union Depot Minnequa Steel Works Office Building Colorado State University-Pueblo Pueblo County Courthouse

- Flag Seal
- Nicknames: Home of Heroes, Steel City
- Motto: "A City Of Excellence"
- Interactive map of Pueblo, Colorado
- Location within Colorado Location within the United States
- Coordinates: 38°15′20″N 104°36′50″W
- Country: United States
- State: Colorado
- County: Pueblo
- Incorporated: November 15, 1885

Government
  - Type: Home rule city
  - Body: Pueblo City Council
  - Mayor: Heather Graham

Area
  - Total: 56.083 sq mi (145.254 km^{2})
  - Land: 55.382 sq mi (143.439 km^{2})
  - Water: 0.701 sq mi (1.815 km^{2})
- Elevation: 4,692 ft (1,430 m)

Population (2020)
  - Total: 111,876
  - Rank: 9th in Colorado; 273rd in the United States
  - Density: 2,020.07/sq mi (779.955/km^{2})
- Demonym: Puebloan
- Time zone: UTC−07:00 (MST)
  - Summer (DST): UTC−06:00 (MDT)
- ZIP codes: 81001-81012
- Area code: 719
- GNIS town ID: 2411501
- FIPS code: FIPS 08 62000
- Website: pueblo.us

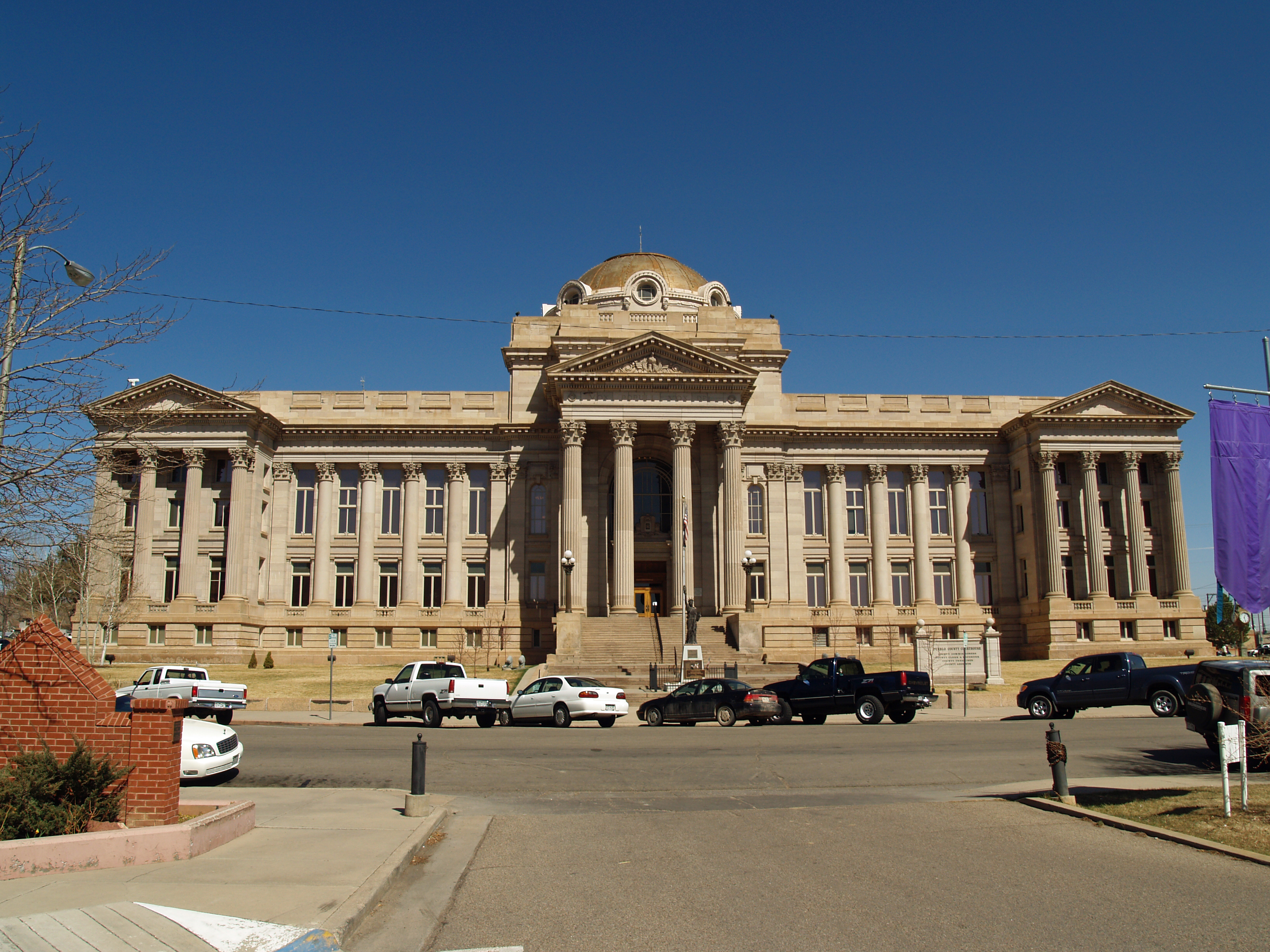
The Pueblo County Courthouse has a large brass top easily seen from Interstate 25 to the east.

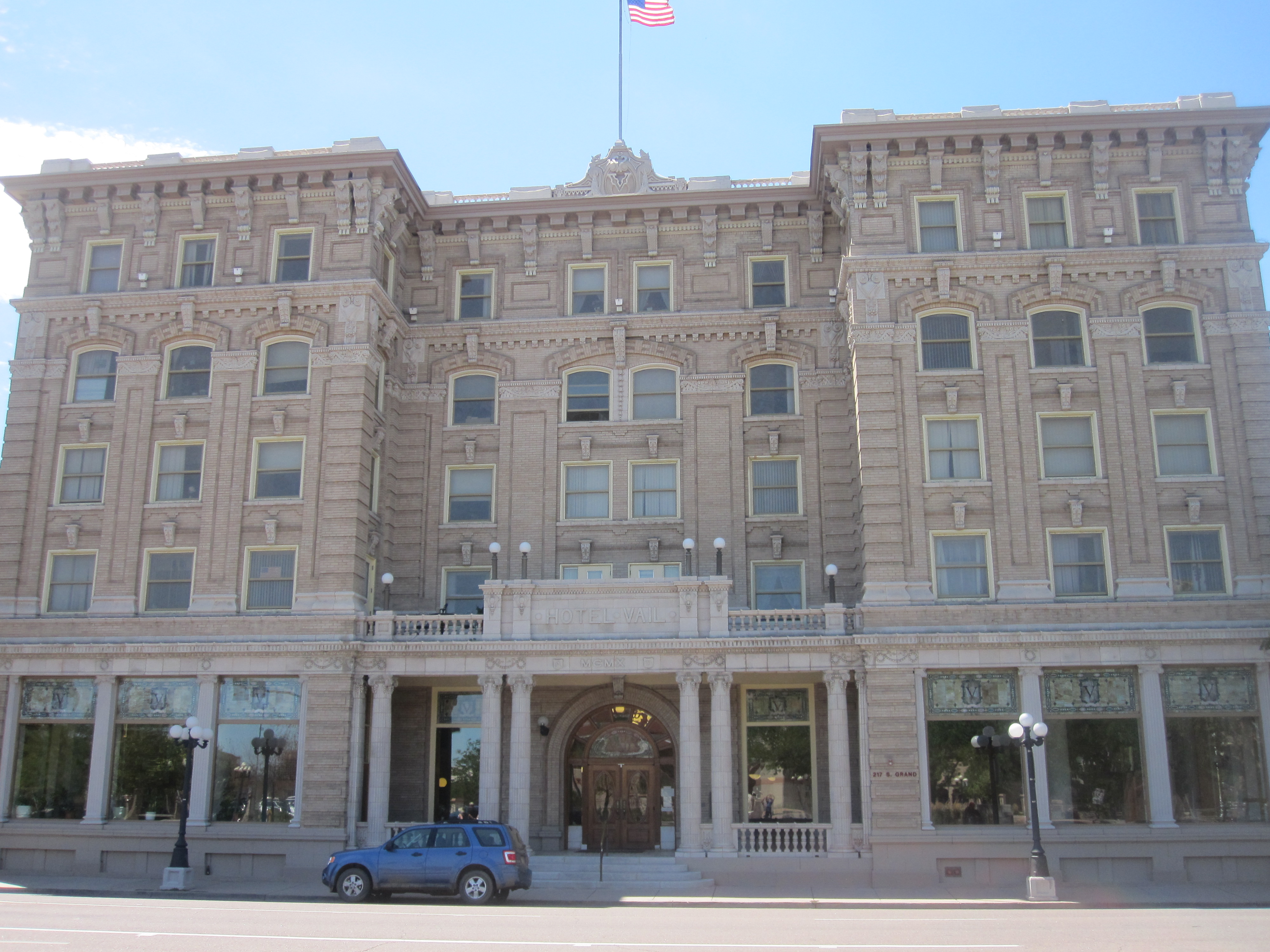
The Hotel Vail in downtown Pueblo

Pueblo (/ˈpwɛbloʊ/ PWEB-loh; Spanish for "town") is the home rule municipality that is the county seat of and the most populous municipality in Pueblo County, Colorado, United States. The city population was 111,876 at the 2020 census, making Pueblo the ninth-most populous city in Colorado. Pueblo is the principal city of the Pueblo, CO Metropolitan Statistical Area and a major city of the Front Range Urban Corridor.

Pueblo is situated at the confluence of the Arkansas River and Fountain Creek, 112 miles (180 km) south of the Colorado State Capitol in Denver. The area is considered semi-arid desert land, with approximately 12 inches (304.80 mm) of precipitation annually. With its location in the "Banana Belt", Pueblo tends to get less snow than the other major cities in Colorado.

Pueblo is one of the largest steel-producing cities in the United States, for which reason Pueblo is referred to as the "Steel City". The city is also a hub of higher education, enrolling nearly 14,000 students between Colorado State University Pueblo and Pueblo Community College. The Historic Arkansas River Project (HARP) is a riverwalk in the Union Avenue Historic Commercial District, and shows the history of the devastating Pueblo Flood of 1921.

== History ==
=== Indigenous history ===
From 1050 to 1450, the area that is now Pueblo was first inhabited by Paleo-Indians and Archaic peoples, as well as people of the Apishapa culture. By 1500, the Ute hunter-gatherers inhabited the region, who hunted in the mountains during the summer and wintered in warmer areas, such as modern-day Pueblo, during the winter. In 1521, Spain assumed control of the land, however, very little settlement or occupation ever occurred. By the time of the 17th century, the Ute acquired horses from the Spanish allowing them to hunt bison on the plains. The Ute bands of the Pueblo area were the Tabaguache and the Muache. Along the eastern Arkansas River, the Jicarilla Apache lived in villages and hunted bison, and grew corn, beans, and squash.

During the middle of the 18th century, the Comanche came through the middle of Colorado on horseback, claiming the Arkansas River valley and pushing up against the boundary of New Spain. The Ute and Comanche formed an alliance, trading and raiding along modern-day Southern Colorado and Northern New Mexico. In 1779 between modern-day Pueblo and Colorado City, Juan Bautista de Anza invaded the area and killed the Comanche leader Cuerno Verde. Despite the loss, the indigenous peoples continued to fight back against the Spanish, with the Comanche claiming swathes of land from Southeastern Colorado to Texas.

By the early 1800s, the Arapaho entered and claimed modern-day Pueblo as well, having a fierce rivalry with the Ute. The area was also frequented by the Cheyenne and the Pawnee.

=== El Pueblo ===
James Beckwourth, George Simpson, and other trappers such as Mathew Kinkead and John Brown, claimed to have helped construct the plaza that became known as El Pueblo around 1842. According to accounts of residents who traded at the plaza (including that of George Simpson), the Fort Pueblo Massacre happened sometime between December 23 and 25, 1854, by a war party of Utes and Jicarilla Apaches under the leadership of Tierra Blanca, a Ute chief. They allegedly killed between fifteen and nineteen men, as well as captured two children and one woman. The trading post was abandoned after the raid.

=== Early development: railroads, steel, expansion, and orphanages ===
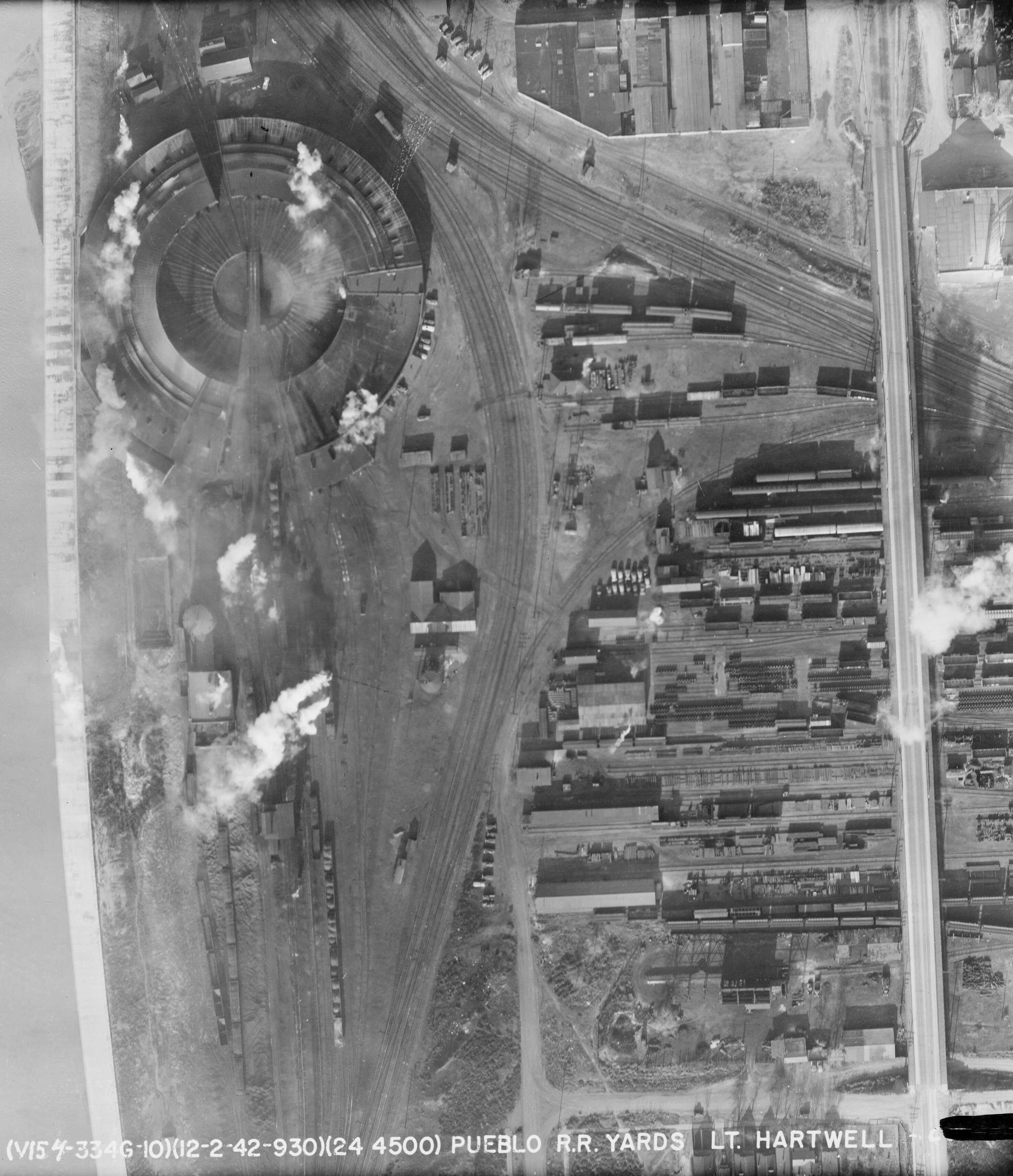
Railroad yards in Pueblo, 1943

In 1848, as a result of the Mexican-American War, the United States acquired the area of Pueblo County south of the Arkansas as part of the Mexican Cession. The Colorado Gold Rush began in 1858, springing interest in the area back up. Independence, a traveling camp opened on the east side of Fountain creek, later being named Fountain City once Josiah Smith's prospecting party arrived in September. Pueblo as well as Fountain City were both platted in 1860. The Pueblo, Kansas Territory, post office opened on December 13, 1860. Pueblo became the namesake of the county when the Territory of Colorado was established by Congress in 1861.

By the outbreak of the American Civil War in 1861, the area was used as a secret gathering place for Coloradoan recruits of the Confederate States Army.

The Cheyenne and Arapahoe were ousted from Colorado to Oklahoma in 1867 from the Medicine Lodge Treaty, and the Ute were ousted to Western Colorado via the Treaty of 1868. 1869 saw Charles Goodnight pioneering the Goodnight-Loving Trail, afterwards he grazed cattle in the region. His ranch headquarters were established in Rock Canyon Ranch (also known as Goodnight Ranch), west of Pueblo in the Nolan Grant. The bison population nationwide began to significantly lower, leading to cattle heads from the plains coming during the 1870s.

The current city of Pueblo represents the consolidation of four towns: Pueblo (incorporated 1870), South Pueblo (incorporated 1873), Central Pueblo (incorporated 1882), and Bessemer (incorporated 1886). Pueblo, South Pueblo, and Central Pueblo legally consolidated as the City of Pueblo between March 9 and April 6, 1886. Bessemer joined Pueblo in 1894.

The consolidated city became a major economic and social center of Colorado, and was home to important early Colorado families such as the Thatchers, the Ormans, and the Adams. By the early 1870s the city was being hailed as a beacon of development, with newspapers like the Chicago Tribune boasting of how the region's lawless reputation was giving way to orderly agriculture with triumphalist rhetoric. One author crowed of Pueblo that "the necessity exists no longer for Sharp's rifles and revolvers. These have been [supplanted] by the plow and the mowing-machine."

The arrival of railroads accelerated the development of industry. The narrow gauge Denver & Rio Grande was the first, arriving from the north in mid 1871. In 1882 the Denver & New Orleans (later part of the Colorado and Southern) extended southward, connecting to the Fort Worth and Denver City Railway. The Denver & Santa Fe (a subsidiary of the Atchison Topeka & Santa Fe) arrived from the south in 1887. The Missouri Pacific Railroad also arrived that year from the east, as did the Rock Island soon after.

Pueblo's development quickly stretched beyond agriculture. Steel emerged as a key industry very early, and in 1909 the city was considered the only steel town west of the Mississippi River.

Until a series of major floods culminated in the Great Flood of 1921, Pueblo was considered the 'Saddle-Making capital of the World'. Roughly one-third of Pueblo's downtown businesses were lost in this flood, along with a substantial number of buildings. Pueblo struggled with this significant loss, but has had a resurgence in growth.

Historically, many people were influenced by the orphanages of Pueblo, and the homes are now all historical sites. The three orphanages in Pueblo were known as Sacred Heart, Lincoln, and McClelland. Lincoln was the first historically black orphanage in Colorado, and one of only seven in the country. Sacred Heart was run by the Catholic Welfare Bureau, while McClelland was run by the Lutheran Church. Several children from Cuba were placed at Sacred Heart as part of "Operation Pedro Pan". Though the orphanages in Pueblo are no longer in service, the buildings still exist and have transformed with the times. According to the Rocky Mountain News, in 1988 the Sacred Heart Orphanage was bought by the Pueblo Housing Authority and turned into 40 small-family housing units.

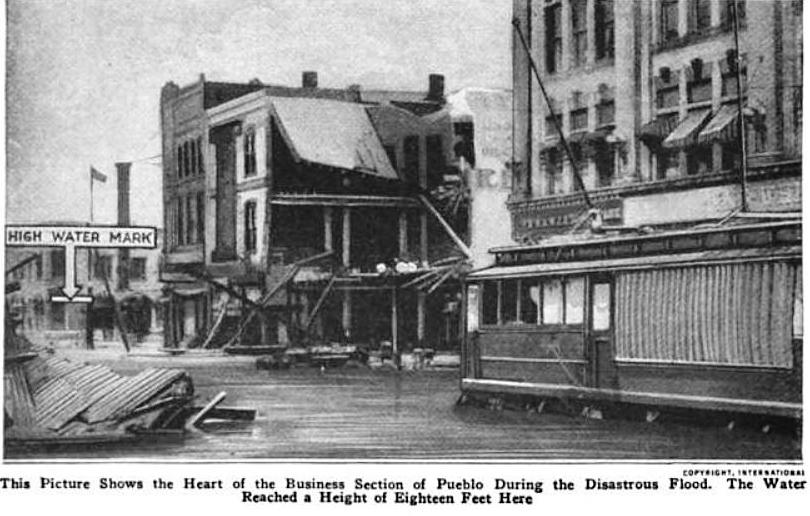
From Popular Mechanics magazine (1921)

=== Steel mill ===
The main industry in Pueblo for most of its history was the Colorado Fuel and Iron (CF&I) Steel Mill on the south side of town. For nearly a century the CF&I was the largest employer in the state of Colorado. The steel-market crash of 1982 led to the decline of the company. After several bankruptcies, the company was acquired by Oregon Steel Mills and changed its name to Rocky Mountain Steel Mills. The buyout, as well as the end of the union contract in 1997 led to a union strike over pension liabilities, as well as working conditions, wherein the union argued the new owners still needed to pay the pension liabilities provided by the previous owners. With the conclusion of the strike on December 30, 1997, CF&I had replaced several hundred union workers with local employees.

In September 2004, both United Steelworkers locals 2102 and 3267 won the strike and the unfair labor practice charges. All of the striking steel workers returned to their jobs, and the company paid them the back pay owed for the seven years they were on strike. In 2007, shortly after Oregon Steel made amends with the union and its workers, Evraz Group, one of Russia's biggest steel producers, agreed to buy the company for $2.3 billion.

Of the many production and fabrication mills that once existed on the site, only the steel production (electric furnaces, used for scrap recycling), rail, rod, bar, and seamless tube mills are still in operation. The wire mill was sold in the late 1990s to Davis Wire, which produced products such as fence and nails under the CF&I brand name. The facility operated blast furnaces until 1982, when the steel market collapsed. The main blast furnace structures were torn down in 1989 and the remaining ones in 1990.

Several of the administration buildings, including the main office building, dispensary, and tunnel gatehouse were purchased in 2003 by the Bessemer Historical Society. In 2006, they underwent renovation. In addition to housing the historic CF&I Archives, they also house the Steelworks Museum of Industry and Culture.

=== "Melting Pot of the West" ===
Due to the growth of the CF&I steel mill and the employment that it offered, Pueblo in the early twentieth century attracted a large number of immigrant laborers. The groups represented led to Pueblo becoming the most ethnically and culturally diverse city in Colorado and the West. At one point, more than 40 languages were spoken in the steel mill and more than two-dozen foreign language newspapers were published in the city. Irish, Italian, German, Slovenian, Greek, Jewish, Lithuanian, Russian, Hungarian, Japanese, and African-American groups arrived in the area at the turn of the century and remain to the present time. The convergence of cultures led to a cosmopolitan character to the city that resulted in a number of ethnically rooted neighborhoods that are typically not seen west of the Mississippi. Respective cultural groups maintain cultural festivals to the present, with the city being home to locations of the Order Sons of Italy, American Slovenian Catholic Union, and I.O.O.F., among others.

=== Colorado Mental Health Institute at Pueblo ===
Another major employer in Pueblo is Colorado State Hospital. The hospital is the preeminent mental health facility in the Rocky Mountain region. Established in 1879 as the Colorado State Insane Asylum, it was renamed as the Colorado State Hospital in 1917. In 1991, the name was changed to the Colorado Mental Health Institute at Pueblo (CMHIP). The Robert L. Hawkins High Security Forensic Institute opened in June 2009 and is a 200-bed, high-security facility.

=== Home of Heroes ===
Pueblo is the hometown of four Medal of Honor recipients (tied only with Holland, Michigan, also with four, each having more than any other municipality in the United States): William J. Crawford, Carl L. Sitter, Raymond G. Murphy, and Drew D. Dix. President Dwight D. Eisenhower, upon presenting Raymond G. "Jerry" Murphy with his medal in 1953, commented, "What is it... something in the water out there in Pueblo? All you guys turn out to be heroes!"

In 1993, Pueblo City Council adopted the tagline "Home of Heroes" for the city due to the fact that Pueblo can claim more recipients of the Medal per capita than any other city in the United States. On July 1, 1993, the Congressional Record recognized Pueblo as the "Home of Heroes." A memorial to the recipients of the medal is at the Pueblo Convention Center.

From 1846 to 1847, three detachments of the Mormon Battalion wintered in Pueblo during the Mexican–American War.

== Geography ==
Pueblo is 115 miles (185 km) south of Denver and is on the front range of the Rocky Mountains. Pueblo sits on the western edge of the Great Plains in a high desert area of terrain in southern Colorado and is near the western edge of the Southwestern Tablelands ecology region.

At the 2020 United States Census, the city had a total area of 35,893 acres (145.254 km^{2}), including 448 acres (1.815 km^{2}) of water.

=== Climate ===
Climate chart for Pueblo

Pueblo has a Semi-arid climate (Köppen BSk), with four distinct seasons. Winter days are usually mild, but the high does not surpass freezing on an average 14.4 days per year, and lows fall to 0 °F (−18 °C) or below on 6.2 nights. Snowfall usually falls in light amounts, and rarely remains on the ground for long (typically, for one or two days). January is the snowiest month, and the seasonal average is 28.3 inches (72 cm); however, snow is uncommon in October, and in May or September, snow is exceedingly rare, with an average first and last date of measurable (≥0.1 in or 0.25 cm) snowfall being November 4 and April 9, respectively. Summers are hot and dry, with 90 °F (32 °C) or greater highs are on average seen 71.6 days per year, with 100 °F (38 °C) or greater on 12.0 days. Diurnal temperature ranges are large throughout the year, averaging 32.5 °F (18.1 °C).

Precipitation is generally low, with the winter months receiving very little. Sunshine is abundant throughout the year, with an annual total of nearly 3,470 hours, or 78% of the possible total. Pueblo is considered a high desert climate, and sits on the desert lands in southern Colorado between Pueblo and the Royal Gorge.

The hottest temperature recorded in Pueblo was 109 °F (42.8 °C) on July 13, 2003, while the coldest temperature recorded was −31 °F (−35.0 °C) on February 1, 1951.

Climate data for Pueblo, Colorado (Pueblo Memorial Airport), 1991–2020 normals, extremes 1888–present
Month	Jan	Feb	Mar	Apr	May	Jun	Jul	Aug	Sep	Oct	Nov	Dec	Year
Record high °F (°C)	81 (27)	83 (28)	93 (34)	94 (34)	102 (39)	108 (42)	109 (43)	107 (42)	103 (39)	94 (34)	86 (30)	82 (28)	109 (43)
Mean maximum °F (°C)	70.3 (21.3)	71.8 (22.1)	79.9 (26.6)	86.2 (30.1)	93.4 (34.1)	101.2 (38.4)	103.3 (39.6)	100.2 (37.9)	96.3 (35.7)	88.5 (31.4)	77.2 (25.1)	69.3 (20.7)	103.9 (39.9)
Mean daily maximum °F (°C)	48.4 (9.1)	51.1 (10.6)	60.6 (15.9)	67.3 (19.6)	77.2 (25.1)	88.6 (31.4)	93.4 (34.1)	90.2 (32.3)	83.1 (28.4)	69.7 (20.9)	56.7 (13.7)	47.5 (8.6)	69.5 (20.8)
Daily mean °F (°C)	31.9 (−0.1)	35.1 (1.7)	43.9 (6.6)	51.3 (10.7)	61.4 (16.3)	71.8 (22.1)	77.2 (25.1)	74.8 (23.8)	66.6 (19.2)	52.8 (11.6)	40.5 (4.7)	31.7 (−0.2)	53.2 (11.8)
Mean daily minimum °F (°C)	15.4 (−9.2)	19.0 (−7.2)	27.1 (−2.7)	35.3 (1.8)	45.6 (7.6)	55.0 (12.8)	61.0 (16.1)	59.4 (15.2)	50.1 (10.1)	35.9 (2.2)	24.2 (−4.3)	15.9 (−8.9)	37.0 (2.8)
Mean minimum °F (°C)	−4.8 (−20.4)	−1.2 (−18.4)	9.6 (−12.4)	20.9 (−6.2)	31.0 (−0.6)	43.4 (6.3)	52.1 (11.2)	50.2 (10.1)	35.9 (2.2)	18.5 (−7.5)	5.1 (−14.9)	−5.2 (−20.7)	−10.4 (−23.6)
Record low °F (°C)	−29 (−34)	−31 (−35)	−20 (−29)	2 (−17)	23 (−5)	32 (0)	41 (5)	39 (4)	21 (−6)	−8 (−22)	−17 (−27)	−28 (−33)	−31 (−35)
Average precipitation inches (mm)	0.29 (7.4)	0.32 (8.1)	0.82 (21)	1.57 (40)	1.57 (40)	1.28 (33)	1.89 (48)	2.11 (54)	0.65 (17)	0.76 (19)	0.47 (12)	0.29 (7.4)	12.02 (305)
Average snowfall inches (cm)	4.9 (12)	4.7 (12)	4.5 (11)	3.4 (8.6)	0.0 (0.0)	0.0 (0.0)	0.0 (0.0)	0.0 (0.0)	0.2 (0.51)	1.9 (4.8)	4.1 (10)	4.6 (12)	28.3 (72)
Average extreme snow depth inches (cm)	2.4 (6.1)	2.2 (5.6)	2.1 (5.3)	1.1 (2.8)	0.0 (0.0)	0.0 (0.0)	0.0 (0.0)	0.0 (0.0)	0.0 (0.0)	0.8 (2.0)	2.2 (5.6)	2.4 (6.1)	5.2 (13)
Average precipitation days (≥ 0.01 in)	3.8	4.0	5.7	7.0	7.9	6.6	9.2	8.8	4.6	4.2	4.1	3.3	69.2
Average snowy days (≥ 0.1 in)	3.8	3.8	3.0	2.1	0.1	0.0	0.0	0.0	0.1	1.0	2.8	3.6	20.3
Average relative humidity (%)	57.1	52.1	48.7	43.5	44.6	44.9	49.3	51.5	50.2	47.0	57.1	56.6	50.2
Average dew point °F (°C)	13.6 (−10.2)	16.3 (−8.7)	19.8 (−6.8)	25.9 (−3.4)	35.8 (2.1)	44.1 (6.7)	52.5 (11.4)	51.8 (11.0)	42.6 (5.9)	30.2 (−1.0)	23.2 (−4.9)	15.1 (−9.4)	30.9 (−0.6)
Mean monthly sunshine hours	231.0	227.3	284.0	315.1	344.2	360.0	358.8	336.8	298.7	275.5	219.7	210.7	3,461.8
Percentage possible sunshine	76	75	77	80	78	81	80	80	80	79	72	71	78
Source 1: NOAA
Source 2: National Weather Service

See or edit raw graph data.

== Demographics ==
Historical population
Census	Pop.	Note	%±
1870	666		—
1880	3,217		383.0%
1890	24,558		663.4%
1900	28,157		14.7%
1910	41,747		48.3%
1920	43,050		3.1%
1930	50,096		16.4%
1940	52,162		4.1%
1950	63,685		22.1%
1960	91,181		43.2%
1970	97,774		7.2%
1980	101,686		4.0%
1990	98,640		−3.0%
2000	102,121		3.5%
2010	106,595		4.4%
2020	111,876		5.0%
2024 (est.)	111,166	▼	−0.6%
U.S. Decennial Census

=== 2020 census ===
Pueblo, Colorado – Racial and ethnic composition Note: the US Census treats Hispanic/Latino as an ethnic category. This table excludes Latinos from the racial categories and assigns them to a separate category. Hispanics/Latinos may be of any race.
Race / Ethnicity (NH = Non-Hispanic)	Pop 2000	Pop 2010	Pop 2020	% 2000	% 2010	% 2020
White alone (NH)	52,202	48,195	48,001	51.12%	45.21%	42.91%
Black or African American alone (NH)	2,199	2,221	2,492	2.15%	2.08%	2.23%
Native American or Alaska Native alone (NH)	622	682	923	0.61%	0.64%	0.83%
Asian alone (NH)	623	792	1,065	0.61%	0.74%	0.95%
Pacific Islander alone (NH)	39	79	107	0.04%	0.07%	0.10%
Some Other Race alone (NH)	170	195	647	0.17%	0.18%	0.58%
Mixed Race or Multi-Racial (NH)	1,200	1,333	3,508	1.18%	1.25%	3.14%
Hispanic or Latino (any race)	45,066	53,098	55,133	44.13%	49.81%	49.28%
Total	102,121	106,595	111,876	100.00%	100.00%	100.00%

=== 2010 ===
As of the 2010 census, the population of Pueblo was 106,544 (259th most populous U.S. city), the population of the Pueblo Metropolitan Statistical Area was 159,063 (190th most populous MSA), the population of the Pueblo–Cañon City, CO Combined Statistical Area was 205,887, the population of the South Central Colorado Urban Area was 851,500, and the population of the Front Range Urban Corridor in Colorado was an estimated 4,166,855.

In 2010, the racial makeup of the city was: 75.2% White, 2.5% Black or African American, 2.2% American Indian and Alaska Native, 0.8% Asian, 0.1% Native Hawaiian and Other Pacific Islander, 4.1% two or more races. Hispanic or Latino residents (of any race) were 49.8% and Non-Hispanic Whites were 45.2% of the population.

=== 2000 ===
As of the census of 2000, there were 102,121 people, 40,307 households, and 26,118 families residing in the city. The population density was 2,265.5 inhabitants per square mile (874.7/km^{2}). There were 43,121 housing units at an average density of 956.6 units per square mile (369.3 units/km^{2}). The racial makeup of the city was 56.21% White, 2.41% African American, 1.73% Native American, 0.67% Asian, 0.06% Pacific Islander, 15.20% from other races, and 3.71% from two or more races. Residents of Hispanic or Latino ancestry made up 44.13% of the population. 10.1% were of German, 8.1% Italian, 6.0% American, 5.5% English and 5.4% Irish ancestry according to Census 2000.

According to the 2005 Census estimates, the city had grown to an estimated population of 104,951 and had become the ninth most populous city in the state of Colorado and the 245th most populous city in the United States.

There were 40,307 households, out of which 29.8% had children under the age of 18 living with them, 44.5% were married couples living together, 15.1% had a female householder with no husband present, and 35.2% were non-families. 30.0% of all households were made up of individuals, and 12.9% had someone living alone who was 65 years of age or older. The average household size was 2.44 and the average family size was 3.03.

In the city, 25.1% of the population was under the age of 18, 10.3% was from 18 to 24, 26.6% from 25 to 44, 21.4% from 45 to 64, and 16.6% was 65 years of age or older. The median age was 36 years. For every 100 females, there were 93.9 males. For every 100 females age 18 and over, there were 90.2 males.

The median income for a household in the city was $29,650, and the median income for a family was $35,620. Males had a median income of $29,702 versus $22,197 for females. The per capita income for the city was $16,026. About 13.9% of families and 17.8% of the population were below the poverty line, including 24.3% of those under age 18 and 9.1% of those age 65 or over.

== Economy ==
Pueblo is the home of the Federal Citizen Information Center, operated by the General Services Administration, and its Consumer Information Catalog. For over 30 years, public service announcements invited Americans to write for information at "Pueblo, Colorado, 81009". In recent times GSA has incorporated Pueblo into FCIC's toll-free telephone number.

Vestas Wind Systems constructed the largest (nearly 700,000 square feet) wind turbine tower manufacturing plant in the world at Pueblo's industrial park. It sold the facility to CS Wind in 2021.

Renewable Energy Systems Americas broke ground on the Comanche Solar Project seven miles south of Pueblo in 2015. When complete, it will be the largest solar energy farm east of the Rocky Mountains, and its backers say the project will produce electricity more cheaply than natural gas. The project will cover 1,000 acres with 500,000 solar panels, providing a capacity of 156 megawatts of power—enough to supply 31,000 homes. The project will be run by SunEdison, with a power purchase agreement signed by Xcel Energy. A number of scientific studies now list Pueblo as the state's primary locale for solar energy development and the premier setting for solar companies to locate, placing it ahead of regional rivals such as Boulder, Colorado and Taos, New Mexico.

In February 2017, Pueblo City Council voted to commit the city to 100% renewable energy ("Ready for 100%") by 2035, with the city's electric franchisee, Black Hills Energy, expected to ramp up its renewable energy portfolio from 29% to 65%. Pueblo County commissioners joined the renewable commitment in April 2018. For several years, Pueblo's Energy Future has been pushing the city to become a municipal electric provider. Among the claimed advantages for the move toward independence: lower cost to the consumer, increased reliability and the opportunity to move more aggressively toward renewable energy development. At one time, an August 2020 "divorce" seemed possible.

Top employers

According to Pueblo's 2023 Comprehensive Annual Financial Report, the top employers in the city are:

#	Employer	# of Employees
1	UCHealth Parkview Medical Center	4,293
2	Colorado Mental Health Hospital in Pueblo	2,000
3	Pueblo School District 60	1,677
4	Colorado State University Pueblo	1,500
5	Walmart*	1,493
6	Pueblo County	1,242
7	Pueblo County School District 70	1,195
8	Evraz Rocky Mountain Steel	931
9	City of Pueblo	776
10	Trane Commercial Systems	760
*Includes all stores and management in Pueblo County

== Arts and culture ==
Pueblo is the home to Colorado's largest single event, the Colorado State Fair, held annually in the late summer, and the largest parade, the state fair parade, as well as an annual Chile & Frijoles Festival.

=== Venues, museums, and sites ===
- Rosemount Museum
- Sangre de Cristo Arts and Conference Center
- Buell Children's Museum
- City Park Carousel
- El Pueblo History Museum
- Lake Pueblo State Park
- Nature and Wildlife Discovery Center
- Pueblo Ice Arena
- Pueblo Zoo
- Steelworks Museum managed by the Steelworks Center of the West
- Union Avenue Historic Commercial District
- Weisbrod Aircraft Museum
- Pueblo City-County Library District

== Sports ==
Pueblo is the hometown of Dutch Clark, the first man from Colorado inducted into the Pro Football Hall of Fame as well as the Colorado Sports Hall of Fame. The primary football stadium belonging to Pueblo School District 60 is named for him. Two long-standing high school rivalries are played annually at this stadium. The Bell Game has been played annually since 1892 between the Central Wildcats and the Centennial Bulldogs in what is touted as the oldest football rivalry west of the Mississippi River.

In 2008, Professional Bull Riders (PBR) moved its corporate headquarters to Pueblo. This became the site of their world headquarters based at the Historic Arkansas Riverwalk located bordering the Union Avenue Historic Commercial District.

In 2014, the Colorado State University Pueblo ThunderWolves won the NCAA Division II Football Championship, a first national title for the football program.

In 2019, the Pueblo Bulls junior ice hockey team in the United States Premier Hockey League, began play out of the Pueblo Ice Arena.

== Government ==
City Government:
Mayor	Heather Graham
Deputy mayor	Chris Noeller, Police Chief
District 1	Dianne Danti
District 2	Joe Latino
District 3	Ted Hernandez
District 4	Roger Gomez (VP)
At-large	Brett Boston
At-large	Selena Ruiz-Gomez
At-large	Mark Aliff (President)

Pueblo is a state-chartered municipal corporation, previously governed by its city council without the office of mayor and administered by a city manager. In 2017 voters passed Question 2A changing the city charter to a strong-mayor form of city government known as "Mayor-Council Government". Only two other cities in the state of Colorado use the strong-mayor form of government, Denver and Colorado Springs. In 2018 an election was held for mayor for the first time in over sixty years, due to none of the sixteen candidates getting more than fifty percent of the vote, a runoff was required to decide the winner.

In January 2019, attorney Nick Gradisar faced former Pueblo City Council President Steve Nawrocki, Gradisar prevailed and was sworn in as mayor on the first of February for a term of five years, with all subsequent mayoral terms being four years and a maximum of two consecutive terms.

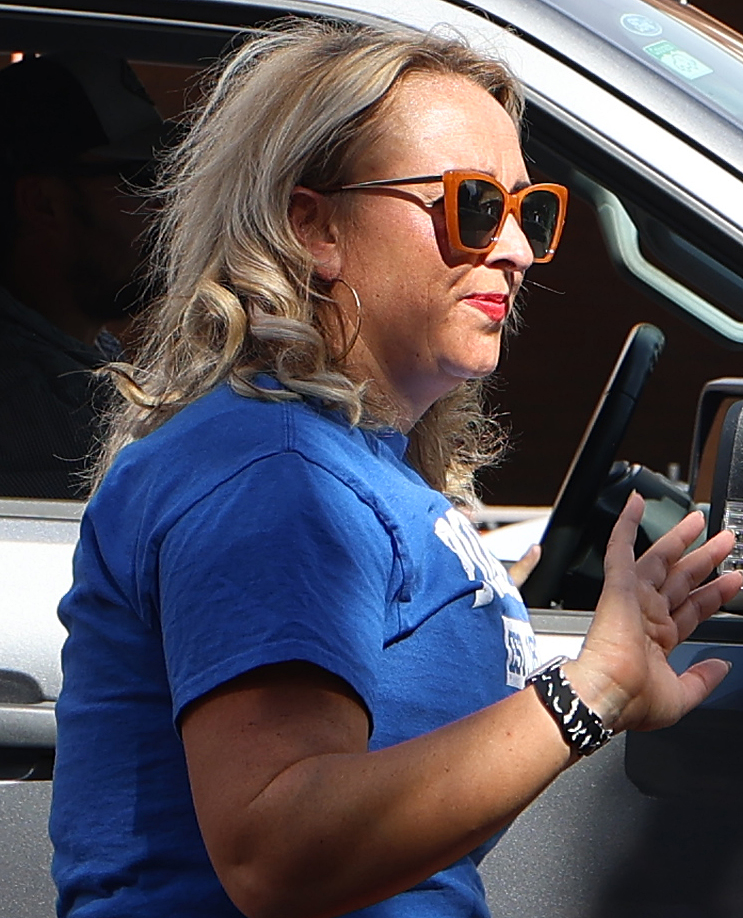
Mayor Heather Graham in 2026

Gradisar ran for re-election in 2023 and faced a runoff against Heather Graham in January 2024. In the runoff, Graham defeated Gradisar and was sworn in as mayor on February 1, 2024.

The deputy mayor is selected by the mayor and must be confirmed by a vote of the city council, the deputy mayor serves a term of one year. According to the city charter, the deputy mayor must be a city department head.

The city council is elected by the residents of the city. There are seven council seats, four of which are elected by district, and three elected at-large.

Pueblo is included in Colorado's 3rd Congressional District in the U.S. House of Representatives, and is currently represented by Republican Jeff Hurd. Pueblo is also included in the 3rd District of the Colorado State Senate, currently represented by Democrat Nick Hinrichsen, and districts 46 and 62 of the Colorado State House, currently represented by Democrats Tisha Mauro and Matthew Martinez.

=== Municipal law enforcement ===
The Pueblo Police Department is led by Chief Chris Noeller Per capita, the crime rate in Pueblo is higher than the national average for a city of the same size and does not take into account the surrounding unincorporated cumulative population of 176,529. In 2016, the FBI's Uniform Crime Report listed Pueblo's major reported crimes stats as: 1,081 violent crime, murders 9, rape 171, robbery 224, aggravated assault 677, property crimes (all) 7,473, burglary 1,797, larceny 4,505, motor vehicle theft (all) 1,171, arson 49.

== Education ==
=== Higher education ===
Pueblo is home to Colorado State University Pueblo (CSU Pueblo), a regional comprehensive university. It is part of the Colorado State University System (CSU System), with about 4,500 students. On May 8, 2007, CSU Pueblo received approval from the Board of Governors of the Colorado State University System to bring back football as a member of the Rocky Mountain Athletic Conference. The first game was played in the fall of 2008 at the ThunderBowl, a stadium at CSU Pueblo for over 12,000 spectators. In 2014, the football team won the NCAA Division II Football Championship.

Pueblo Community College (PCC) is a two-year, public, comprehensive community college, one of thirteen community colleges within the Colorado Community College System (CCCS). It operates three campuses serving a widely dispersed eight-county region in Southern Colorado. The main campus is located in Pueblo and serves Pueblo County. The Fremont Campus is located approximately 35 miles (56 km) west of Pueblo in Cañon City and serves Fremont and Custer Counties. The Southwest Campus, 280 miles (450 km) southwest of Pueblo, serves Montezuma, Dolores, La Plata, San Juan, and Archuleta counties. PCC is a Hispanic Serving Institution as designated by the Federal Government. Approximately 5,000 students attend PCC per semester.

=== Primary and secondary education ===
Almost all of the city limits is within Pueblo School District 60. Very small portions lie within Pueblo County School District 70.

Centennial High School was founded north of downtown on Eleventh Street in 1876, the year Colorado entered the Union. Centennial was rebuilt on a new site to the northwest in 1973. Central High School was founded in Bessemer in 1882. Central's present campus on East Orman Avenue was built in 1906 and expanded in the early 1970s. Its original building still stands four blocks away on East Pitkin Avenue. South High School and East High School were built in the late 1950s to accommodate the Baby Boomer generation. Pueblo County High School, east of the city in Vineland, serves rural residents. Rye High School is in a foothills town southwest of Pueblo. Pueblo West High School is located in the northwestern suburb of Pueblo West.

Pueblo Catholic High School closed in 1971. Its building became Roncalli Middle School in the early 1970s. By 1975 all Catholic schools in Pueblo (under the Roman Catholic Diocese of Pueblo) had closed. As of 2017 there are two Catholic grade schools in Pueblo: St. John Neumann Catholic School and St. Therese Catholic School.

Dolores Huerta Preparatory High School was founded in 2004, and relocated to its current building in 2007. It features the only Early College Program in Pueblo recognized by the State of Colorado, where many students graduate with their associate degree from Pueblo Community College while also earning credit from Colorado State University Pueblo. Other Pueblo area high schools include Southern Colorado Early College, School of Engineering and Biomedical Science (formerly Pueblo Technical Academy), Parkhill Christian Academy and the Health Academy.

== Media ==
=== Print ===
- The Pueblo Chieftain
- CSU Pueblo TODAY
- PULP News Magazine
- Senior Beacon

=== Radio ===
The Pueblo radio market includes all of Pueblo County. In its Fall 2013 ranking of radio markets by population, Arbitron ranked the Pueblo market 238th in the United States. Six AM and 15 FM radio stations broadcast from or are licensed to the city.

Due to Pueblo's proximity to Colorado Springs, local listeners can also receive the signal of most radio stations broadcasting from the Colorado Springs radio market.

=== Television ===
The Colorado Springs–Pueblo market is the 90th largest television market in the United States.

== Transportation ==
Union Depot, built in 1889–1890

=== Local and regional buses ===
The City of Pueblo operates Pueblo Transit. Greyhound Lines provides bus service towards Denver, Colorado; Amarillo, Texas; Albuquerque, New Mexico. Regional bus service to La Junta, Lamar, Colorado Springs, Alamosa, and Trinidad is provided by the CDOT operated Bustang.

=== Rail ===
Freight rail service is provided by BNSF and Union Pacific.

Pueblo and its Union Depot last saw passenger train service in 1971. Once an important hub, the city was served by four Class 1 railroads, as well as a number of smaller operators.

Amtrak's daily Southwest Chief makes a stop 64 miles (103 km) east of Pueblo at La Junta, providing direct rail transport to Los Angeles, Albuquerque, Kansas City, Chicago, and dozens of smaller locales. In 2016, Amtrak looked at rerouting the Southwest Chief to serve Pueblo directly. It estimated the new stop would increase annual ridership by 14,000 and ticket revenue by $1.45 million.

Pueblo has been proposed as the southern terminus for Front Range Passenger Rail, which would provide service to Colorado Springs, Denver, Boulder, Fort Collins, and Cheyenne.

=== Aviation ===
- Pueblo Memorial Airport - The local airport lies to the east of the city. Throughout the year, aircraft spotters can see large C-130, C-17, and E-3 performing landings and takeoffs. Modern fighters such as the F-22, F-15, F-35, and F-16 are also seen on occasion flying around the facility and parked on the ramp. SkyWest Airlines under the flag of United Express services the airport with non-stop daily flights to Denver International Airport, utilizing Bombardier's CRJ-200 aircraft. The airport is also home to the Pueblo Weisbrod Aircraft Museum (named for Fred Weisbrod, late city manager), reflecting the airport's beginnings as an Army Air Corps base in 1943.
- Pueblo Historical Aircraft Society
- Fremont County Airport is a general aviation field approximately 35 miles (56 km) northwest of Pueblo, near Penrose.

=== Major highways ===
Interstate 25 and US Route 85 run in tandem on the same north–south expressway through Pueblo. US Route 50 runs east–west through Pueblo.

== Notable people ==
=== Politics ===
- Alva Adams, the fifth, tenth, and fourteenth governor of Colorado, from 1887 to 1889, 1897 to 1899, and briefly in 1905
- Alva Blanchard Adams, U.S. senator from Colorado, 1923–1925 and 1933–1941. Son of Alva Adams
- Gordon L. Allott, U.S. senator from Colorado, 1955–1973. Lieutenant Governor of Colorado, 1950–1955
- John Beno (1931–2000), Colorado state senator and Roman Catholic priest
- Thomas M. Bowen, U.S. senator from Colorado, 1883–1889, Governor of Idaho Territory, 1871, Arkansas Supreme Court Justice, 1867–1871
- David Courtney Coates, Lieutenant Governor of Colorado, founding member of the Industrial Workers of the World
- Jeff Crank, U.S. representative from Colorado
- Frank Evans, U.S. representative from Colorado, 1965–1979
- Thomas T. Farley, Colorado state legislator and lawyer
- Joseph A. Garcia, 48th lieutenant governor of Colorado, 2011–2016, former president of Colorado State University Pueblo.
- Simon Guggenheim, U.S. senator from Colorado, 1907–1913, businessman and son of Benjamin Guggenheim
- Asma Gull Hasan, political pundit
- Walter Walford Johnson, 32nd governor of Colorado, 1950–1951
- Raymond P. Kogovsek, U.S. representative from Colorado, 1979–1985
- Joyce Lawrence, former city councilor and Colorado state legislator
- John Andrew Martin, U.S. representative from Colorado, 1909–1913, 1933–1939
- Bat Masterson, iconic figure of American West, sheriff of South Pueblo
- Tisha Mauro, American state legislator
- Rita Martinez, activist against Columbus Day
- James Bradley Orman, twelfth governor of Colorado, in office 1901–1903
- Jim Parco, former United States Air Force lieutenant colonel. Leading critic in religious intolerance crisis at the United States Air Force Academy
- Dana Perino, White House Press Secretary in 2007–2009, graduated from Colorado State University Pueblo in 1994
- Frederick Walker Pitkin, second governor of Colorado from 1879 to 1883
- John E. Rickards, first lieutenant governor of Montana and second governor of Montana
- Fitch Robertson, Mayor of Berkeley, California, from 1943 to 1947
- Ray Herbert Talbot, 26th lieutenant governor of Colorado, from 1932 to 1937. 27th Governor of Colorado, 1937
- Bill Thiebaut, former district attorney, former Colorado state senator, and state senate majority leader
- Larry Trujillo, Colorado state legislator
- Hubert Work, 47th United States Postmaster General, 1922 to 1923. Later the 29th United States Secretary of the Interior, 1923 to 1928

=== Military ===
- William J. Crawford, Medal of Honor recipient for his service in World War II
- Drew Dennis Dix, Medal of Honor recipient for service in the Vietnam War
- Warren C. Dockum, Medal of Honor recipient for service in the American Civil War. Buried in Pueblo
- Raymond G. Murphy, Medal of Honor recipient for service in the Korean War
- Carl L. Sitter, Medal of Honor recipient for service in the Korean War
- Robert M. Stillman, U.S. Air Force general
- Cathay Williams, first African-American woman to enlist in the United States Army, and the only person documented to have served while posing as a man

=== Business ===
- Ed Beauvais, airline executive
- Jim Bishop, creator of Bishop Castle
- Nona L. Brooks, leader in the New Thought movement and a founder of the Church of Divine Science
- Dan DeRose, businessman and college football player
- Charles Goodnight, legendary Texas cattleman, lived in Pueblo in the 1870s
- Benjamin Guggenheim, businessman who lived in Pueblo from 1888 to 1894, perished aboard the Titanic in 1912
- David Packard, co-founder of Hewlett-Packard computers, considered the "Father of Silicon Valley", Graduated from Pueblo Centennial High School
- William Jackson Palmer, founder of Colorado Fuel and Iron and the Denver and Rio Grande Railroad

=== Arts ===
- Kent Haruf, novelist, born in Pueblo
- Dustin Hodge, television writer and producer, lives in Pueblo
- Bat Masterson, newspaperman, former sheriff of South Pueblo
- John Meston, co-creator and script writer of CBS Western television series Gunsmoke
- E. J. Peaker, actress, star of Hello Dolly, graduated from Centennial High School in 1958
- Blaine L. Reininger, singer and musician of proto-punk and new wave, co-founder of Tuxedomoon
- Kelly Reno, child actor in the 1979 film The Black Stallion and its sequel
- Charles Rocket, Saturday Night Live cast member, formerly a news anchor in Pueblo
- Dan Rowan, star of Rowan & Martin's Laugh-In, lived in McClelland Orphanage in Pueblo and graduated from Pueblo Central High School
- Damon Runyon, newspaperman and playwright; author of Guys and Dolls. Mentioned Pueblo in many of his newspaper columns
- Connie Sawyer, actress
- Rose Siggins, actress
- Lise Simms, actress, singer, designer and dancer
- Margaret Tracey, ballet dancer and educator
- Wanda Tuchock, writer, producer, film pioneer
- Mildred Cozzens Turner, composer
- Michael K. White, writer
- Grant Withers, Hollywood actor from the silent film era to the 1950s
- Ledger Wood, philosopher

=== Sports ===
- Kain Medrano, professional football player
- Nat Borchers, soccer player
- Dax Charles, Division II National Wrestling Champion competing for University of Southern Colorado now known as CSU Pueblo, CSU Pueblo wrestling coach
- Earl "Dutch" Clark, professional football player 1934 – 1938, charter member of Pro Football Hall of Fame, graduated from Pueblo Central High School
- John Davis, Major League Baseball pitcher (1987–1990)
- Tony Falkenstein, pro football fullback and quarterback
- Dave Feamster, ice hockey player who played for the Chicago Blackhawks and businessman
- Nino Giarratano (born 1962), college baseball coach
- John Gill, climber, father of modern bouldering; taught at University of Southern Colorado (CSU Pueblo)
- Kimberly Kim, professional golfer, youngest player to win the U.S. Women's Amateur
- Gary Knafelc, professional football player (1954–1963)
- Turk Lown, Major League Baseball pitcher (1951–1962)
- Bob McGraw, Major League Baseball pitcher (1917–1929), buried in Pueblo
- Tony Mendes, PBR bull rider
- Joe Pannunzio, college football administrator, player and coach.
- Frank Papish, Major League Baseball pitcher (1945 to 1950); deputy sheriff after his baseball career
- Ken Ramos, Major League Baseball outfielder
- Marty Servo, boxing Welterweight Champion of the World, retired to Pueblo
- Kory Sperry, NFL tight end; attended Pueblo County High School
- Shorty Templeman, racing driver
- Cedric Tillman, professional football player
- George Zaharias, professional wrestler, husband of Babe Didrikson

=== Infamous figures ===
- Joe Arridy, mentally disabled man wrongfully convicted of murder and rape; put to death in the 1930s; pardoned in 2011 as the first and only posthumous gubernatorial pardon in the state of Colorado.
- Frank DeSimone, boss of the Los Angeles crime family, born in Pueblo
- Edmund Kemper, serial killer who called police from a phone booth in Pueblo and turned himself in on April 25, 1973, after fleeing from California

=== Activists and organizers ===
- Las Madres de la Casa Verde
- Deborah Mora Espinosa and Juan Espinosa
- Rita Martinez
- Carmen Roybal Arteaga, teacher and founder of the Chicana women's group, OmeXicana and a member of the Chicano Educators
- Judy Baca
- Martín Serna, Chicano activist

=== Other ===
- John Brown, Mountain man, fur trapper, trader, resident of Pueblo in the 1840s.
- Mary Babnik Brown, donated her hair during World War II for the manufacture of hygrometers (hair falsely reported to have been used to make Norden bombsights)
- Rick Edgeman, American statistician and sustainability researcher, born 1954 in Pueblo, Colorado.
- Teresita Sandoval, one of the first women to live in Pueblo. She and her daughters married Anglo mountain men.
- Virginia Tighe, housewife purported to have lived as an Irishwoman named Bridey Murphy in a previous life

== Sister cities ==
Pueblo's sister cities are:

- Bergamo, Italy
- Puebla (city), Mexico
- Maribor, Slovenia
- Chihuahua City, Mexico
- Lucca Sicula, Italy
- Weifang, China

== In popular culture ==
- Pueblo as a frontier town is the setting for Louis L'Amour's 1981 Western novel Milo Talon.
- Many scenes of National Lampoon's Vacation were shot in Pueblo and surrounding areas.
- Many of the scenes in Terrence Malick's 1973 opus Badlands were filmed in and around Pueblo. The film was subsequently selected for preservation by the Library of Congress as being "culturally, historically, or aesthetically significant".
- Pueblo and its Central High School is mentioned in Thomas Pynchon's 2006 historical novel Against the Day.
- Food Wars, a series on cable television's Travel Channel, came to Pueblo to stage a contest between the Sunset Inn's and Gray's Coors Tavern's versions of the slopper. The episode first aired in August 2010.
- Pueblo is portrayed as the city where MacGruber is laid to rest in 2000 in the 2010 film that bears his name.
- The 1959 novel The Caretakers by author Dariel Telfer, along with its 1963 film adaptation, is based upon the author's experiences as an employee at the Colorado State Hospital in Pueblo.
- In the South Park episode "The Losing Edge", Pueblo is one of the towns with which the South Park team competes.
- Many of the Colorado and Kansas scenes of the 1983 film National Lampoon's Vacation were filmed in and around Pueblo. Highway 50 East of Pueblo is the site of Cousin Eddie's house and the hotel in "Creede" Colorado is actually near St. Mary Corwin Hospital.
- The 1980s film Curse of the Blue Lights was set in Pueblo and was filmed on location.
- Little Britches Rodeo, a series on RFD-TV was filmed in Pueblo for the first 4 seasons.
- In the HGTV reality television show, My Lottery Dream Home, the episode titled ‘Brotherly Love’ prominently features Pueblo.

== See also ==
- Pueblo, CO Metropolitan Statistical Area
- Pueblo-Cañon City, CO Combined Statistical Area
- USS Pueblo, 3 ships
