= Pueblo City-County Library District =

- Robert Hoag Rawlings Public Library in Pueblo (Main Branch).
- 38°15′33.8″N 104°37′11.8″W (Main Branch)
- Location: Pueblo County, Colorado, United States
- Type: Public library
- Architect: Antoine Predock (Main Branch)
- Branches: 11

Access and use
- Population served: 165,000+

Other information
- Director: Sherri Baca

The Pueblo City-County Library District is a public library system serving Pueblo County, Colorado. The main branch, the Robert Hoag Rawlings Public Library, is located in the Mesa Junction neighborhood of the City of Pueblo, Colorado. Aside from physical books the library system also provides E-book downloads, Audiobooks, DVD collections, music, streaming movies and free wireless internet connectivity.

The main branch also hosts the InfoZone News Museum which features vintage equipment from The Pueblo Chieftain, a history of newspapers, art exhibits and films.

== Branch libraries ==
- Avondale Elementary School (Avondale)
- Frank and Marie Barkman (City of Pueblo)
- Beulah School of Natural Sciences (Beulah)
- Greenhorn Valley (Colorado City)
- Frank Lamb (City of Pueblo)
- Library @ the Y (City of Pueblo)
- Library @ the U (City of Pueblo)
- Patrick A. Lucero Library (City of Pueblo)
- PCCLD @ Pueblo Community College (City of Pueblo)
- Pueblo West (Pueblo West)
- Robert Hoag Rawlings (Main Branch)(City of Pueblo)
- Tom L. & Anna Marie Giodone Library (Blende)

== Services ==
- Adult Literacy Program
- Assistive Services (For a variety of disabilities.)
- Books in the Park (Outdoor summertime program for children.)
- Digital Memory Lab (Digitize old media.)
- Homebound (Program for residents confined to their home or a care facility.)
- Interlibrary loan
- The Music Box (Recording studio.)

== Awards ==
- 2017 rated a four star library district by Library Journal.
- 2018 rated a four-star library district by Library Journal.
- 2018 the library won the Leslie B. Knope Award for the best library in the nation.
- 2018 Pueblo City-County Library District awarded National Medal for Museum and Library Service.
