= Pueblo High School =

Pueblo High School may refer to:

- Pueblo Catholic High School, Pueblo, Colorado,
- Pueblo County High School, Vineland, Colorado
- Pueblo High School (Tucson), Tucson, Arizona
- Pueblo West High School, Pueblo West, Colorado
