= Nature and Wildlife Discovery Center =

Zoo in Pueblo, Colorado, United States

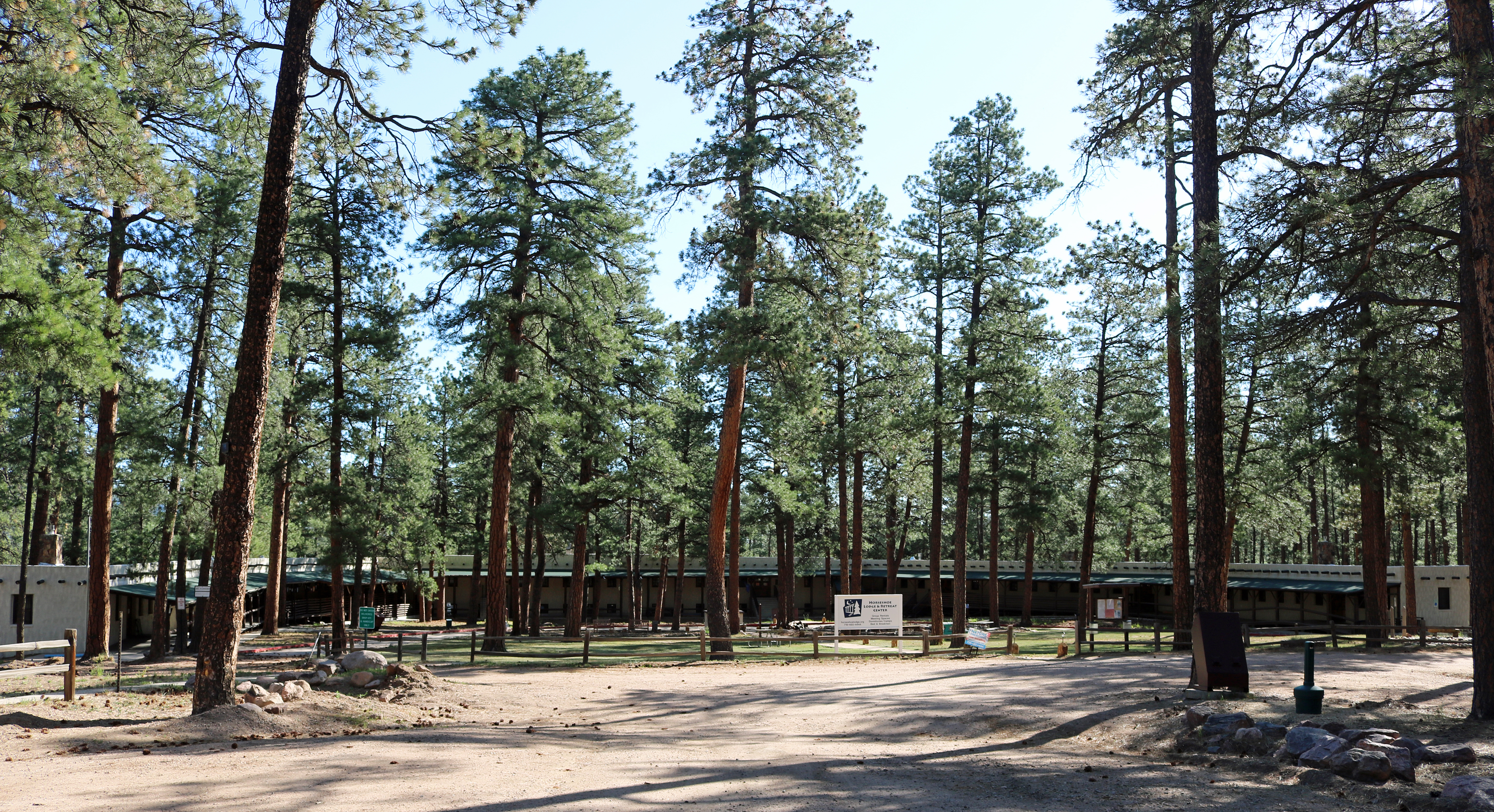
- Horseshoe Lodge is one of the first buildings built at the Pueblo Mountain Park.
- Interactive map of Nature and Wildlife Discovery Center
- 38.271543°N 104.678078°W
- Location: Pueblo, Colorado
- Website: www.hikeandlearn.org

The Nature and Wildlife Discovery Center (NWDC) is a multi-campus nature preserve and educational center in Pueblo County, Colorado. It includes a 611-acre mountain park, a lodge, a gift shop, a museum in Beulah, Colorado, a small museum and educational center, an open-space park on the Arkansas River in Pueblo, and an adjacent raptor education and rehabilitation facility.

The NWDC provides access to two distinct areas of Pueblo County. The NWDC's River Campus is located in Rock Canyon on the banks of the Arkansas River at 5200 Nature Center Road, and includes aquatic, riparian, transition, and semi-arid shortgrass prairie habitats. The Raptor Center is adjacent to the river.

The NWDC Mountain Campus is located in Beulah, CO, at 9112 Mountain Park Road, and has ponderosa pine and mixed fir forests, foothills, transition habitats, and access to the adjacent San Isabel National Forest. The NWDC is organized as a 501(c)(3) tax-exempt corporation.

The NWDC Mountain Campus unfortunately burned down in the Aspen Acres Fire and is closed to the public for the foreseeable future.

== History ==
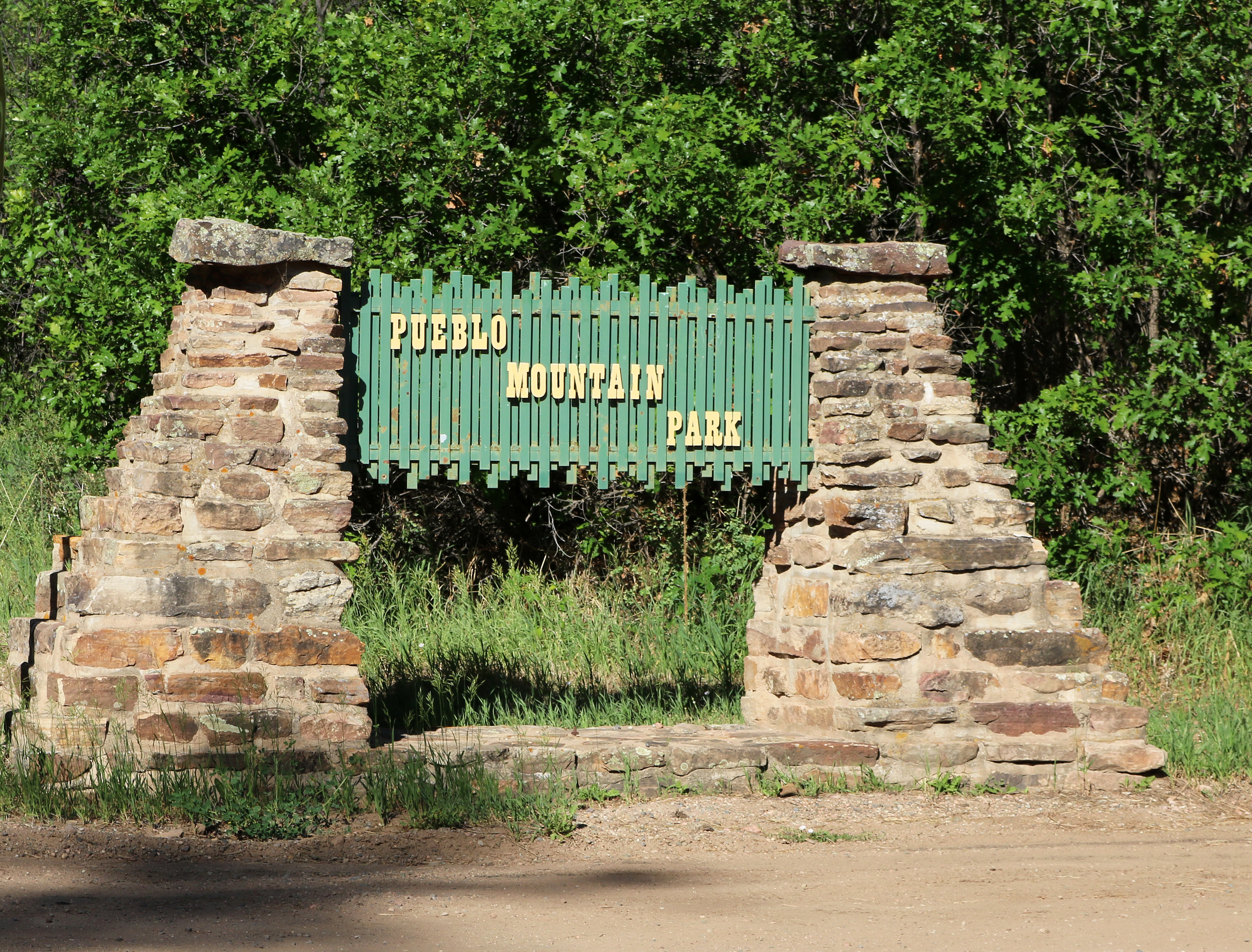
The park is owned by the City of Pueblo, but the park is managed by the Nature and Wildlife Discovery Center.

The Arkansas Valley Audubon Society established the Audubon River Trails Nature Center in 1979 to preserve a public-use area. In 1981, the Raptor Center was added, and by 1983, the nature center was incorporated as a 501(c)(3) tax-exempt organization known as "The Greenway and Nature Center of Pueblo." In 2008, it was renamed the "Nature and Raptor Center of Pueblo."

Pueblo Mountain Park, located in Pueblo, Colorado, was acquired by the City of Pueblo in 1920, following the advocacy of the San Isabel Public Recreation Association and inspiration from United States Forest Service official Arthur Carhart. During the Great Depression, the Works Progress Administration (WPA) and Civilian Conservation Corps (CCC) constructed several facilities at the park, including the original Horseshoe Lodge, the Pavilion, the Ballfield, and various road grades and bridges. Throughout the 20th century, the park experienced periods of disuse, and there were times when the City of Pueblo considered selling the property.

In 1999, the Mountain Park Environmental Association was formed by Pueblo citizens to develop programs and improve access to the mountain park. Since 2000, this organization, which later became the Mountain Park Environmental Center, managed the park on behalf of the City of Pueblo. In 2018, the Mountain Park Environmental Center merged with the Nature and Raptor Center of Pueblo to form the current Nature and Wildlife Discovery Center, which continues to manage the park while the City of Pueblo retains ownership of the land. Since 2018, the center reaches 7,500 people per year through awareness on the dangers raptors face due to environmental changes.

== Facilities ==
The Nature and Wildlife Discovery Center (NWDC) offers a diverse array of opportunities across its two campuses: the River Campus and the Mountain Park Campus. Each campus provides unique habitats and activities for visitors.

=== River Campus ===
The River Campus features a mix of aquatic, riparian, transition, and semi-arid grassland habitats. Activities available at this campus include picnicking, wildlife viewing, fishing, kayaking, and nature walks. The campus provides access to several trails and parks, including:

- Pueblo River Trail System
- Honor Farm Open Space Park
- Pueblo Motorsports Park
- Pueblo Whitewater Park
- Valco Ponds
- Lake Pueblo State Park

=== Raptor Center ===
The Raptor Center, established in 1981, is part of the River Campus and focuses on the rehabilitation of birds of prey. It cares for injured and orphaned birds from southeastern Colorado, aiming to release them back into the wild. The center attracts thousands of visitors annually, including out-of-town guests, college students, K-12 students, and the general public. In partnership with the Pueblo Zoo, some non-releasable birds are housed at the zoo, providing educational opportunities for the public and ensuring a quality life for the birds.

=== Mountain Park Campus ===
The Mountain Campus, sadly, burned down in the Aspen Acres Fire and is closed to the public.

Located in Beulah, Colorado, the Mountain Park Campus offers access to extensive trails within its 611 acres and on adjacent federal land managed by the United States Forest Service as part of the San Isabel National Forest. The campus features structures from the Works Progress Administration era, including the renovated Horseshoe Lodge, which hosts a small museum, gift shop, and overnight accommodations. The park spans various ecosystems in the foothills transition zone, including forests of ponderosa pine, Douglas fir, white fir, juniper, and oak shrublands.

== Events ==
The Nature and Wildlife Discovery Center kicks off the year by participating in First Day Hike in partnership with Colorado Parks and Wildlife and the Colorado Lottery. In June, NWDC participates in the Steel City Arkansas River Festival (SCARF). On the first Saturday in September, NWDC hosts a Vulture Day celebration at the Raptor Center. In December, NWDC hosts an annual Solstice Walk.

Monthly, NWDC hosts Kneehigh Nature Hour, biweekly Raptor Center Public Tours, third Saturday Yoga on the River, and fourth Saturday Arkansas Valley Audubon Society (AVAS) Bird Walks.

NWDC hosts other public events periodically. See their event calendar on their website for more information and to book tickets to any events.

== Education ==
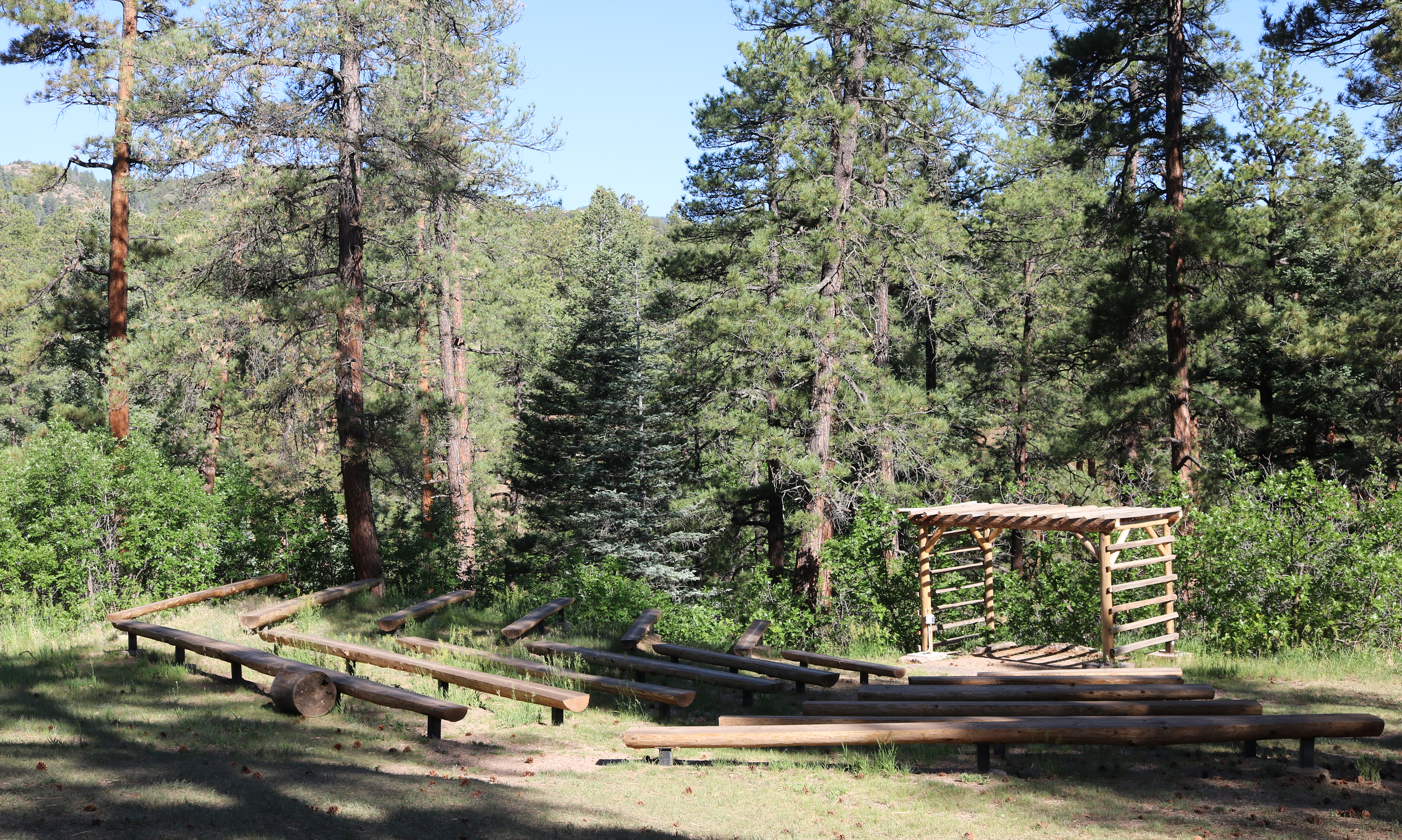
The amphitheater at Pueblo Mountain Park is just one area where educational events take place.

The Nature and Wildlife Discovery Center provides a wide variety of experiential education to local K-12 students, college and university students, interest groups, and the general public. There are biweekly public Raptor Center tours on the first and third Saturdays of the month, a monthly fourth Saturday Birdwalk (led by members of the Arkansas Valley Audubon Society) and full-day Summer Nature Camps for children entering Kindergarten to 12th grade. Registration for camps begins in March and continues through May.

Throughout the academic year, NWDC staff design and lead a environmental science program called Earth Studies for all District 60 5th graders, which uses the outdoor spaces at both campuses to teach concepts in the natural sciences. Students visit each campus several times and experience the seasons, the wildlife, the plants, and the land across the year. The Earth Studies program received an award, titled "Best New Program Award", from the Colorado Alliance for Environmental Education (CAEE), in 2003.

NWDC also operates an early-childhood preschool program called Earthkeeper Nature School. For children ages 4–7, it offers a progressive, nature-based curriculum at both campuses. Students from Pueblo Community College and Colorado State University-Pueblo also visit NWDC's campuses to develop skills in outdoor education.

NWDC also offers a free homeschool enrichment program called the Outdoor Explorations Program (OEP) for students K-12th grade. OEP is on hiatus for the 26-27 school year but will hopefully return in the 27-28 school year.

== Conservation ==
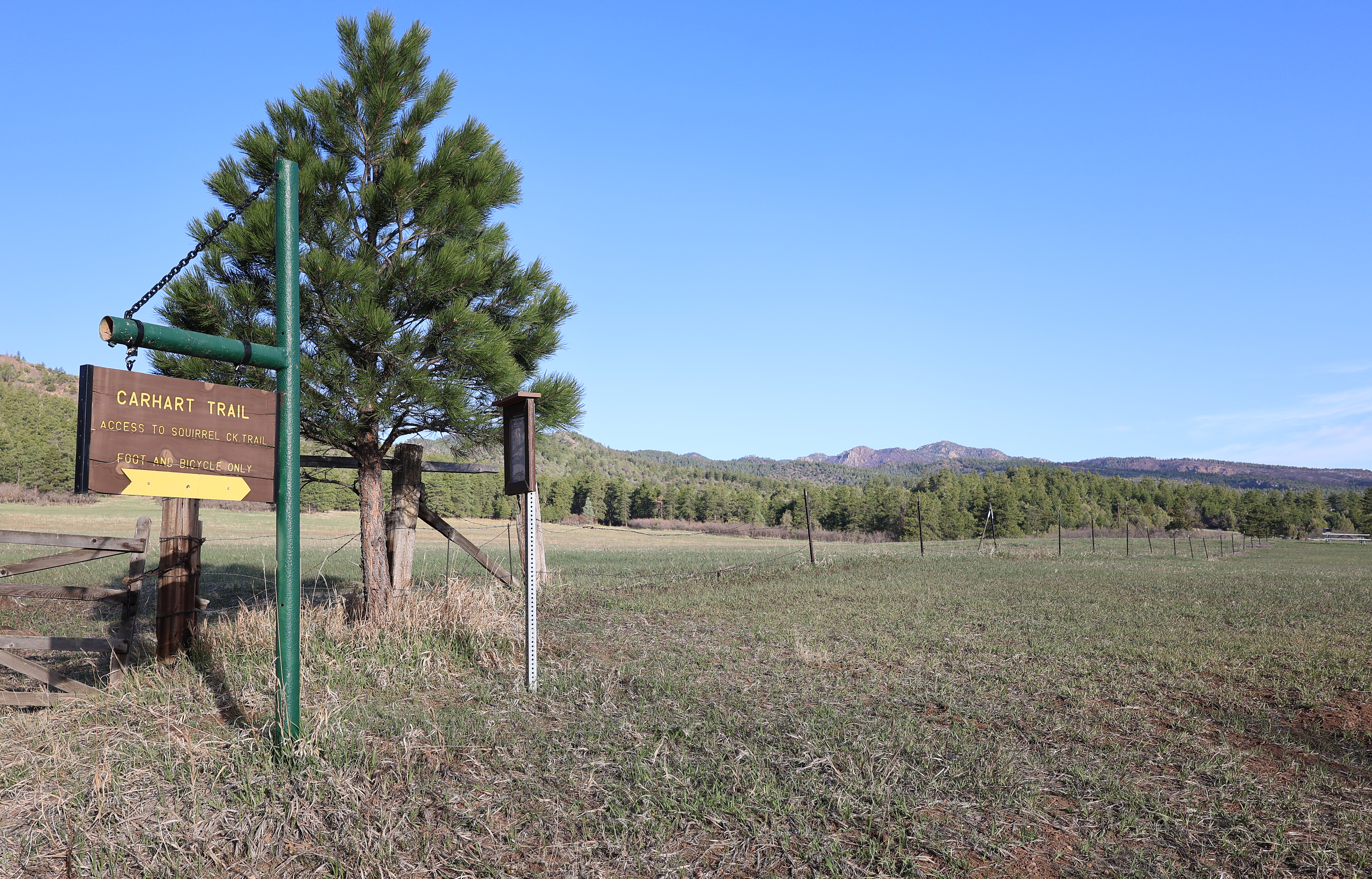
Carhart Trail trailhead which connects to Squirrel Creek.

Each year, the Raptor Center admits, rehabilitates, and releases hundreds of injured, orphaned, or otherwise compromised eagles, hawks, owls, falcons, vultures, and other birds of prey.

NWDC and Southern Colorado Trail Builders constructed the Carhart Trail, a multi-use trail at the Mountain Campus that connects to Squirrel Creek campground and trail system in the San Isabel National Forest. The Carhart Trail is the first trail at the Mountain Campus accessible to mountain bikers as well as pedestrians and horseback riders. The Carhart Trail is named for Arthur Carhart, an early pioneer in the design of recreational access points for National Forest lands.

NWDC also hosts annual river cleanups at the River Campus, coordinating volunteers in cleaning the banks of the Arkansas River through Rock Canyon.
