= Rye High School =

Rye High School may refer to:

- Rye High School (Colorado), located in Rye, Colorado
- Rye High School (New York), located in Rye, New York
- Toronto Metropolitan University, formerly known as Ryerson University, pejoratively known as Rye High by many students of the University of Toronto due the former's lower academic standards
