= Vineland, Colorado =

Census-designated place in Pueblo County, CO, USA

- Census-designated place
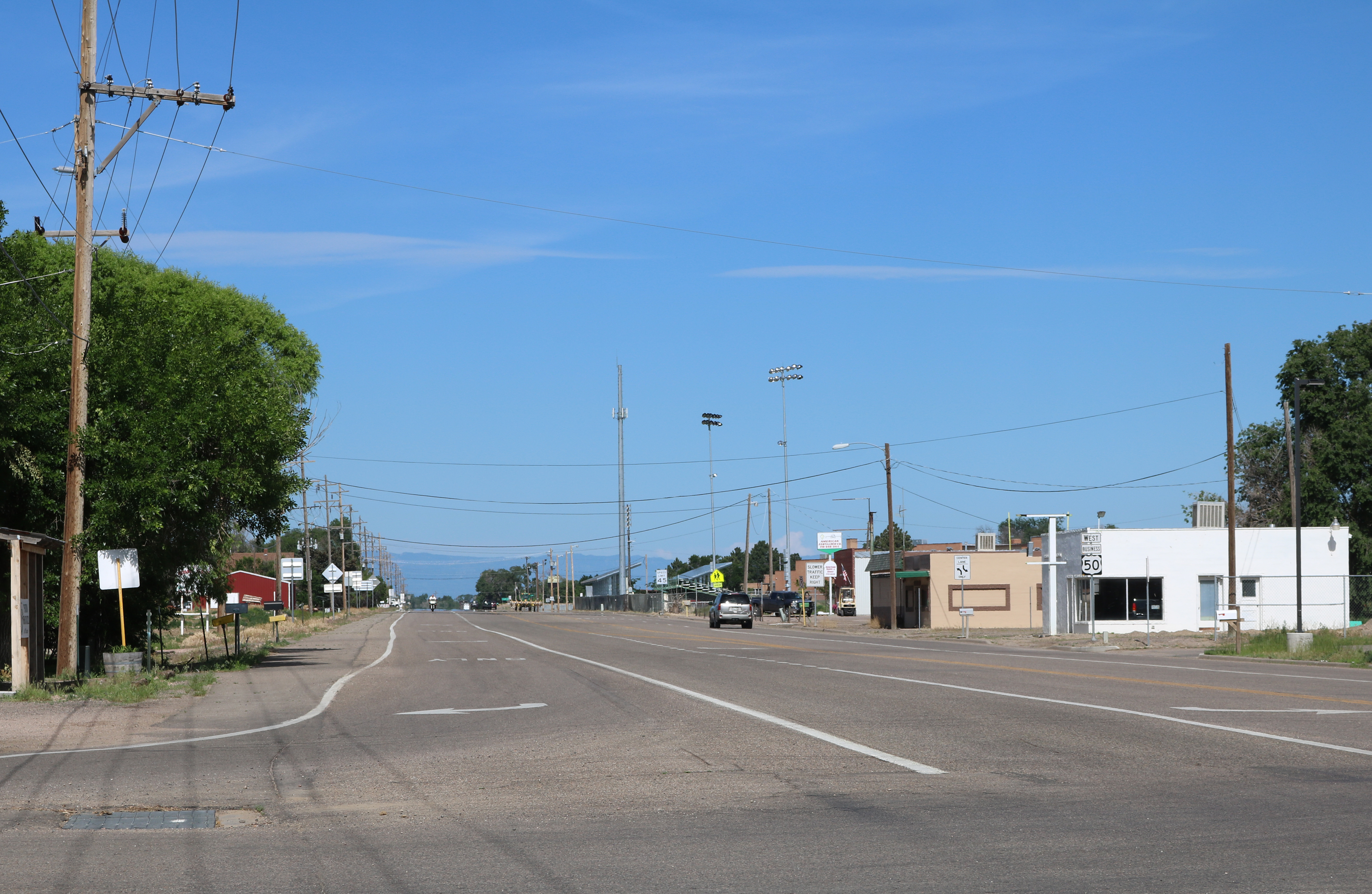
- Santa Fe Drive in Vineland, looking west from 36th Lane.

- Location of the Vineland CDP in Pueblo County, Colorado
- Coordinates: 38°14′41″N 104°27′36″W
- Country: United States
- State: Colorado
- County: Pueblo County

Government
  - Type: unincorporated community

Area
  - Total: 0.566 sq mi (1.467 km^{2})
  - Land: 0.566 sq mi (1.467 km^{2})
  - Water: 0 sq mi (0.000 km^{2})
- Elevation: 4,646 ft (1,416 m)

Population (2020)
  - Total: 269
  - Density: 475/sq mi (183/km^{2})
- Time zone: UTC-7 (MST)
  - Summer (DST): UTC-6 (MDT)
- ZIP Code: Pueblo 81006
- Area code: 719
- GNIS feature ID: 2583313

Vineland is a census-designated place (CDP) in and governed by Pueblo County, Colorado, United States. The CDP is a part of the Pueblo, CO Metropolitan Statistical Area. The population of the Vineland CDP was 269 at the United States Census 2020. The Pueblo post office (Zip Code 81006) serves the area.

== Geography ==
Vineland is just east of the St. Charles River on East US Highway 50 (Business), sometimes called Santa Fe. The area is known in for its family-operated vegetable farms.

The Vineland CDP has an area of 363 acres (1.467 km^{2}), all land.

== Demographics ==
Vineland CDP, Colorado
Year	Pop.	±%
2010	251	—
2020	269	+7.2%
Source: United States Census Bureau

The United States Census Bureau initially defined the Vineland CDP for the United States Census 2010.

== Education ==
Vineland is served by the Pueblo County School District 70. It is the home of Pueblo County High School, Vineland Elementary School, and Vineland Middle School.

Vineland was first zoned to Pueblo County High in 1953. Prior to that year, its high school was Vineland High School. By 2020, Vineland Elementary received a science, technology, engineering, agriculture, and mathematics (STEAM) program.

== See also ==
- List of census-designated places in Colorado
