= Boone, Colorado =

Statutory town in Pueblo County, Colorado, United States

- Statutory town
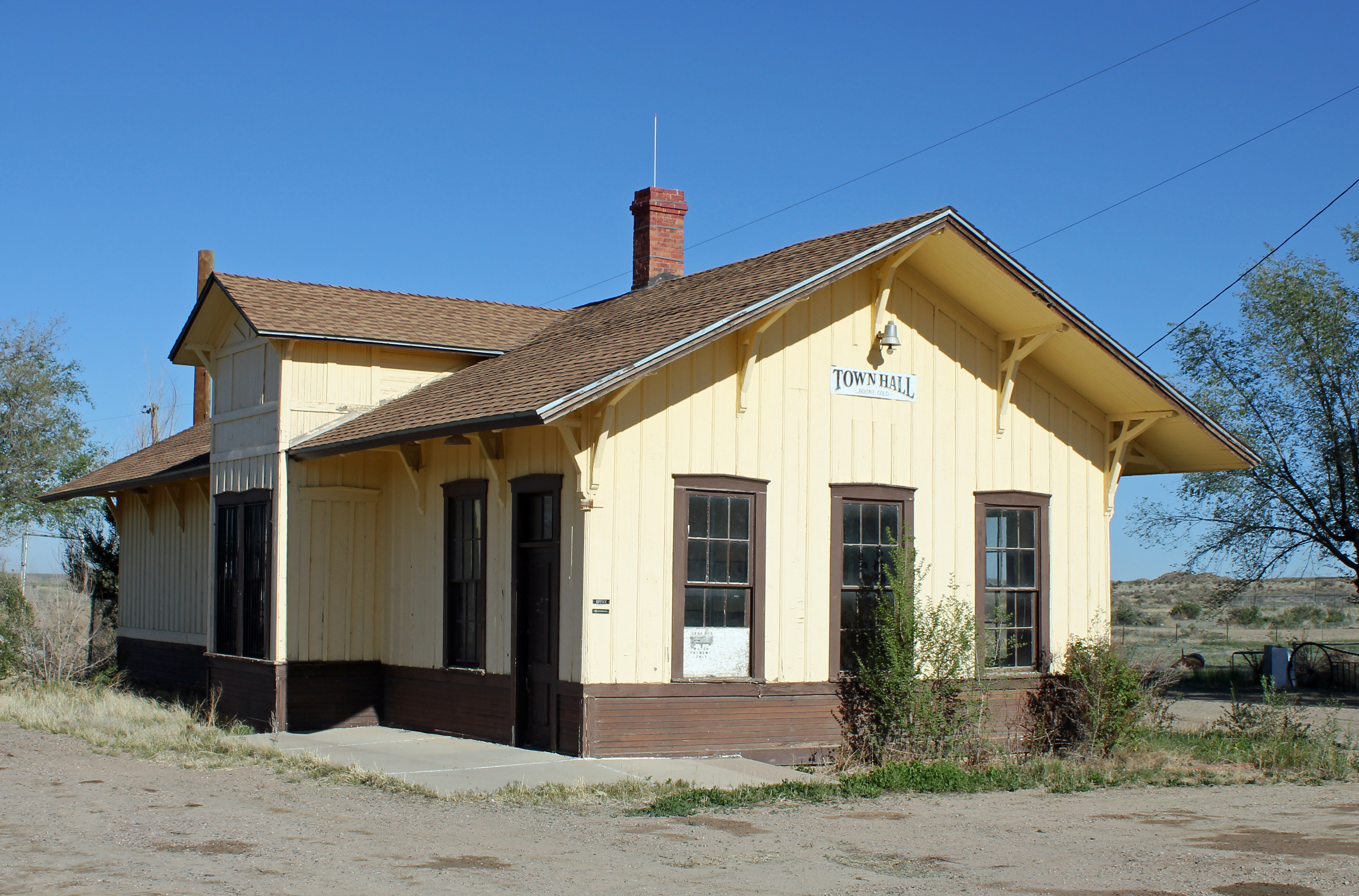
- The old Boone Santa Fe Railroad depot that used to serve as the town hall.

- Location of the Town of Boone in Pueblo County, Colorado
- Coordinates: 38°15′02″N 104°15′28″W
- Country: United States
- State: Colorado
- County: Pueblo
- Incorporated (town): September 22, 1956

Government
  - Type: Statutory town

Area
  - Total: 0.388 sq mi (1.006 km^{2})
  - Land: 0.379 sq mi (0.981 km^{2})
  - Water: 0.0097 sq mi (0.025 km^{2})
- Elevation: 4,465 ft (1,361 m)

Population (2020)
  - Total: 305
  - Density: 805/sq mi (311/km^{2})
- Time zone: UTC−07:00 (MST)
  - Summer (DST): UTC−06:00 (MDT)
- ZIP code: 81025
- Area code: 719
- GNIS town ID: 2411709
- FIPS code: 08-07795
- Website: boone.colorado.gov

Boone is a statutory town located along the Arkansas River in Pueblo County, Colorado, United States. The town population was 305 at the 2020 United States census.

== History ==
Boone was founded as Booneville during the Pikes Peak Gold Rush by Albert Gallatin Boone, a grandson of Daniel Boone. The Booneville, Colorado Territory, post office opened on January 2, 1863. Boone was the first postmaster and for a brief time Indian agent to the Cheyenne and Arapaho. Colorado became a state on August 1, 1876. The name of the Booneville post office was shortened to Boone on December 5, 1891, and the Town of Boone was incorporated on September 22, 1956.

== Geography ==
At the 2020 United States census, the town had a total area of 249 acres (1.006 km^{2}) including 6.2 acres (0.025 km^{2}) of water.

== Demographics ==
Historical population
Census	Pop.	Note	%±
1960	548		—
1970	448		−18.2%
1980	431		−3.8%
1990	341		−20.9%
2000	323		−5.3%
2010	339		5.0%
2020	305		−10.0%
U.S. Decennial Census

Boone is a part of the Pueblo, CO Metropolitan Statistical Area and the Front Range Urban Corridor.

As of the census of 2000, there were 323 people, 131 households, and 89 families residing in the town. The population density was 719.7 inhabitants per square mile (277.9/km^{2}). There were 148 housing units at an average density of 329.8 per square mile (127.3/km^{2}). The racial makeup of the town was 93.50% White, 0.62% African American, 0.62% Native American, 1.55% from other races, and 3.72% from two or more races. Hispanic or Latino of any race were 31.58% of the population.

There were 131 households, out of which 26.0% had children under the age of 18 living with them, 50.4% were married couples living together, 14.5% had a female householder with no husband present, and 31.3% were non-families. 26.0% of all households were made up of individuals, and 14.5% had someone living alone who was 65 years of age or older. The average household size was 2.38 and the average family size was 2.84.

In the town, the population was spread out, with 23.2% under the age of 18, 7.1% from 18 to 24, 22.6% from 25 to 44, 22.3% from 45 to 64, and 24.8% who were 65 years of age or older. The median age was 43 years. For every 100 females, there were 88.9 males. For every 100 females age 18 and over, there were 89.3 males.

The median income for a household in the town was $26,250, and the median income for a family was $26,964. Males had a median income of $26,563 versus $21,875 for females. The per capita income for the town was $18,628. About 7.8% of families and 16.0% of the population were below the poverty line, including 28.9% of those under age 18 and 13.0% of those age 65 or over.

== Education ==
It is in the Pueblo County School District 70. Zoned schools include Avondale Elementary School, Vineland Middle School, and Pueblo County High School.

Boone was first zoned to Pueblo County High at some point after 1953. Boone previously had its own elementary school, with its final building opening in the 1950s, but the numbers of students declined, and it closed in 1987.

== See also ==
- Pike's Peak Gold Rush
- Pueblo, CO Metropolitan Statistical Area
