= Pueblo County High School =

- Main entrance of the school

Location
- 1050 Lane 35; Pueblo, Colorado address 81006; United States; 38°14′47″N 104°28′04″W

Information
- Type: Public School
- Motto: "Small School Environment with Big School Opportunities"
- Established: 1953 (73 years ago)
- School district: Pueblo County School District 70
- CEEB code: 061205
- Principal: Brian Dilka
- Staff: 59.66 (FTE)
- Grades: 9–12
- Enrollment: 1,194 (2023-2024)
- Student to teacher ratio: 20.01
- Colors: Green and gold
- Athletics: League 3A-4 South Central, Division 3A-4A
- Mascot: Hornet
- Website: pch.district70.org

Pueblo County High School is a four-year public high school in Vineland, an unincorporated area in Pueblo County, Colorado, near Pueblo. It is a part of the Pueblo County School District 70.

Pueblo County High School offers courses for all academic levels, as well as the languages of Spanish and Italian. It also incorporates the School of Engineering and Biomedical Science (SEBS) program.

== History ==
In the early 1950s it was decided by the School Board to build Pueblo County High School as a merging school. The school district chose a cornfield as the site for the new school and bought the land, with April 1953 being the month of the start of construction. A federal grant funded the remainder of the building costs. The total price of the school was $578,000. Students from Avondale, Blende, Pleasant View, and Vineland were enrolled to attend Pueblo County High School in the fall of 1953; at the time, classes were held at Vineland Middle School. In November of that year, the permanent campus of Pueblo County High opened. Students took up Pueblo County High School's new colors and school mascot. A school-wide vote was cast to select the mascot, and a pair of colors. The selected mascot was a Hornet, the colors chosen were green and gold. Later Boone joined the high school's attendance boundary.

While the school opened as a legal senior high school, construction of the building was still in progress, leaving many classrooms unavailable. Students and teachers took learning to the grass, boiler rooms, or inside buses as an alternative. Originally, the location in which Pueblo County High School was built was used as farmland and was tended as such. Harvest time and planting season respectively were the most important times of the year for Pueblo in that era, which caused many students to miss months of school, as Harvesting and Planting was more of a priority.

The Arts Academy at Pueblo County High School was scheduled to begin operations in 2017.

=== Principals ===
The school is overseen by a principal. There has only been one female principal: Terrie Tafoya (2010–2016).

Name	Year
Brian Dilka	(2016 – present)
Terrie Tafoya	(2010–2016)
John DeLuca	(2006–2010)
Jose Perea	(2004–2006)
Chris Gramstorff	(1999–2004)
Dick Amman	(1987–1999)
Jim Blanc	(1983–1987)
John Klomp	(1973–1983)
Mike Stefanic	(1971–1973)
Jerry Ellis	(1962–1971)
Robert Hall	(1955–1962)
Tommy Tucker	(1953–1955)

=== Bond projects ===
In the 1970s Pueblo County High School had roughly 1400 students, and the campus needed to be expanded. A bond issue project, originating in 1977, allowed construction of a pool, auditorium, original stadium, and another building containing classrooms for English and other languages.

In November 2012, Ballot Question 3A was approved, granting a second bond to Pueblo District 70 schools for improvements. NorthStar and H&L were responsible for facility changes. Renovation began in early 2013, including an artificial turf football field and a multi-weather track. The main office structure was moved from the West Building to the center south side of County. A new auxiliary gym, wrestling room, and breezeway were also built.

=== Demographics ===
A visual representation of the Demographics of the school year 2016–2017

As of 2017 there was a close 50–50 ratio between Hispanics or Latinos to Whites. This was due to Pueblo's tie with the largest steel industry in the 1970s, where immigrants came to work, largely Hispanics. Not only did the steel industry influence the demographics of Pueblo, but the land has also been owned by multiple nations, becoming a cultural melting point.

== SEBS – School of Engineering and Biomedical Science ==
The school of Engineering and Biomedical Science, more commonly known as "SEBS," is a specialized program offered to high-level students to prepare for career readiness and hands-on experience in the fields of Engineering and Biomedical Science. There are also courses that assist in careers revolving around software and computer programing within SEBS. SEBS is paired with Project Lead the Way (PLTW) courses, and is a certified PLTW school. SEBS courses are only found at Pueblo County High School, although other schools may have a similar plan known as STEM.

Although classified as a separate course, the SEBS program is more commonly known to be a school within a school, rather than offered courses. Students must register into SEBS program. It is expected of all SEBS students to stay within an unweighted Grade Point Average (GPA) of 3.0 or higher. Managers, advisors, and/or counselors may recommend other courses if a student's grade does not meet the above criteria.

Formerly known as Pueblo Technical Academy, SEBS started off as its own District 70 school in the GoodYear building of the Pueblo Industrial Park. John Musso, the current principal of SEBS, was among others who worked on the startup of the school. Economic issues forced the Tech Academy to move to PCC around 2005, then finally to Pueblo County High School in the year of 2010.

== Notable alumni ==
- Kory Sperry, former professional football player
- Kelly Reno, actor
- Andrea Neu, Miss Colorado and 2013 Miss US International
- Tisha Mauro, American politician
- Kim Borrego-Couture, UFC fighter and former wife of Randy Couture
- Joe Pannunzio, running-backs coach at the University of Alabama

== Foreign Exchange Students ==
=== 1984/85 ===
- Stefano Bonzi, Italy
- Andres Handschy, Mexico
- Robertino Janesky, Germany
- Atsuko Obata, Japan
- Jorge Olivares, Mexico
- Günter Pilz, Germany
