= Kory Sperry =

American football player (born 1985)

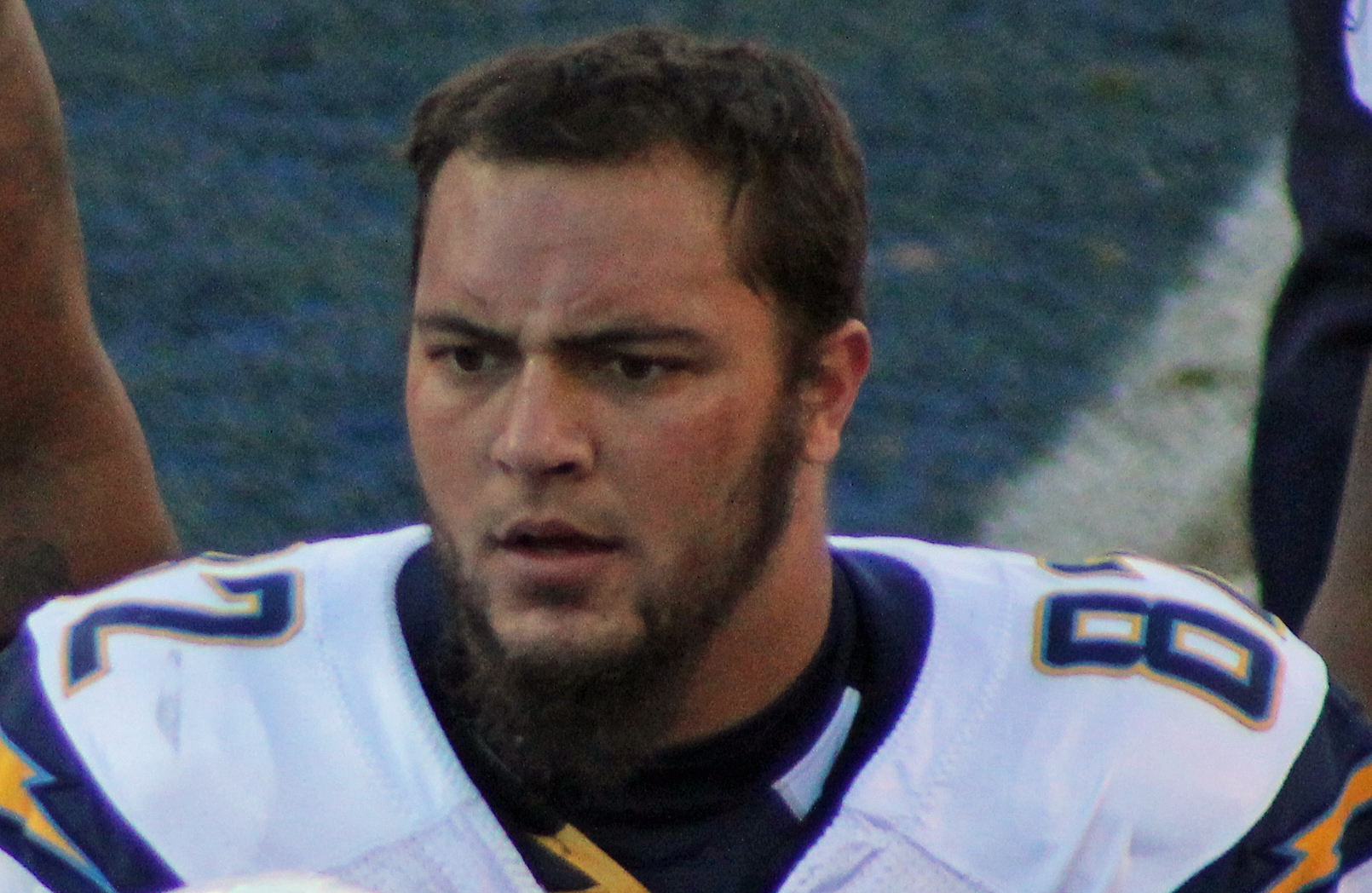
- Sperry in 2011

No. 85, 82, 83
- Position: Tight end

Personal information
- Born: April 10, 1985 (age 41); Pueblo, Colorado, U.S.
- Listed height: 6 ft 5 in (1.96 m)
- Listed weight: 265 lb (120 kg)

Career information
- High school: Pueblo County (Pueblo, Colorado)
- College: Colorado State
- NFL draft: 2009: undrafted

Career history
- San Diego Chargers (2009)*; Miami Dolphins (2009); Denver Broncos (2010)*; San Diego Chargers (2010−2011); Arizona Cardinals (2012−2013); Minnesota Vikings (2014)*
- * Offseason or practice squad member only

Awards and highlights
- Second-team All-MW (2008)

Career NFL statistics
- Receptions: 9
- Receiving yards: 152
- Receiving average: 16.9
- Receiving touchdowns: 1
- Stats at Pro Football Reference

Kory Kalani Kahaunaele Sperry (born April 10, 1985) is an American former professional football player who was a tight end in the National Football League (NFL). He played college football for the Colorado State Rams.

== Early life ==
He attended high school at Pueblo County High School in Pueblo, Colorado.

== Professional career ==
=== Miami Dolphins ===
In Week 10 of the 2009 NFL season, Sperry was activated by the Dolphins. He caught the first touchdown pass of his career against the Tampa Bay Buccaneers.

Sperry was waived by Miami on August 23, 2010.

=== Denver Broncos ===
Sperry was claimed off waivers by the Denver Broncos on August 24.

Sperry was waived by Denver Broncos on September 3, 2010.

=== San Diego Chargers ===
Sperry was signed by the San Diego Chargers on September 7, 2010. Sperry was waived by the chargers on August 31, 2012.

=== Arizona Cardinals ===
Sperry was signed by the Arizona Cardinals on December 4, 2012.

=== Minnesota Vikings ===
Sperry was signed by the Minnesota Vikings on August 10, 2014. The Vikings released Sperry on August 25, 2014.
