= Rye, Colorado =

Town in Colorado, United States

- Town
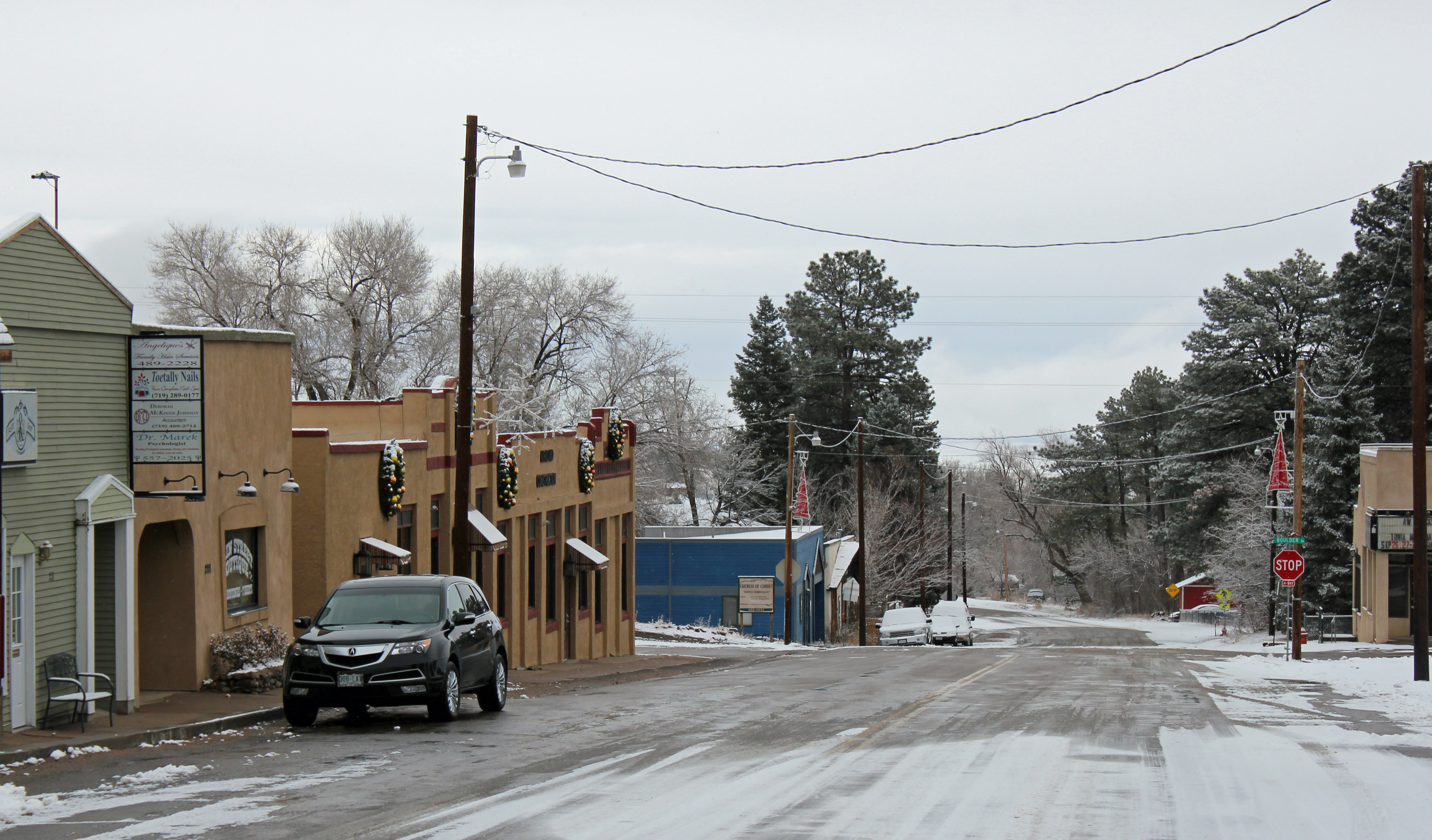
- Main Street in Rye, looking east.

- Location of Rye in Pueblo County, Colorado.
- Coordinates: 37°55′17″N 104°55′55″W
- Country: United States
- State: Colorado
- County: Pueblo County
- Incorporated: November 22, 1937

Government
  - Type: Statutory Town

Area
  - Total: 0.093 sq mi (0.24 km^{2})
  - Land: 0.093 sq mi (0.24 km^{2})
  - Water: 0 sq mi (0.00 km^{2})
- Elevation: 6,828 ft (2,081 m)

Population (2020)
  - Total: 206
  - Density: 2,200/sq mi (860/km^{2})
- Time zone: UTC-7 (Mountain (MST))
  - Summer (DST): UTC-6 (MDT)
- ZIP code: 81069
- Area code: 719
- GNIS feature ID: 2412588
- FIPS code: 08-66895
- Website: Official website

Rye is a Statutory Town in Pueblo County, Colorado, United States. The population was 206 at the 2020 census.

== History ==
A post office called Rye has been in operation since 1881.

Some say the community was named for the wild rye native to the area, while others believe the place is named for rye whiskey.

== Geography ==
Rye is located in the Greenhorn Valley.

According to the United States Census Bureau, the town has a total area of 0.1 square miles (0.26 km^{2}), all of it land.

=== Climate ===
Rye has a subtropical highland climate (Köppen Cfb), a climate type usually associated with maritime regions, but is also found in high elevation areas in which summer temperatures are moderated by altitude. Precipitation exceeds that of semi-arid places, and average winter temperatures exceed freezing (O°C, 32 °F). This isolated pocket of climate exists due to the orographic enhancement of precipitation levels and summers moderated by altitude. Despite its climate Rye has much in common with other locations in its part of Colorado. Although conditions are not wet at any time of year, there is increased precipitation in March and April, as well as a snowfall maximum in March, with the snowiest periods being November and January through April. The North American Monsoon creates a second wet period in June and July. This climate features summers with warm daytime temperatures and mild to cool nights, along with chilly and snowy winters. Typical of its region, winters are quite variable, with December–February temperatures having ranged from as low as −36 °F (−38 °C) to as high as 76 °F (24.4 °C). The all-time record high is 101 °F (38.3 °C), set on June 21, 1981, and the all-time record low is −36 °F (−37.8 °C), set on January 12, 1963.

Climate data for RYE 1SW, CO (1991-2020 normals)
Month	Jan	Feb	Mar	Apr	May	Jun	Jul	Aug	Sep	Oct	Nov	Dec	Year
Mean daily maximum °F (°C)	43.6 (6.4)	44.5 (6.9)	52.3 (11.3)	57.8 (14.3)	67.0 (19.4)	78.6 (25.9)	81.8 (27.7)	79.0 (26.1)	73.4 (23.0)	62.1 (16.7)	51.2 (10.7)	43.1 (6.2)	61.2 (16.2)
Daily mean °F (°C)	33.3 (0.7)	34.3 (1.3)	41.0 (5.0)	46.5 (8.1)	55.4 (13.0)	65.9 (18.8)	69.8 (21.0)	67.6 (19.8)	61.9 (16.6)	50.5 (10.3)	40.7 (4.8)	32.9 (0.5)	50.0 (10.0)
Mean daily minimum °F (°C)	23.1 (−4.9)	24.0 (−4.4)	29.7 (−1.3)	35.3 (1.8)	43.9 (6.6)	53.3 (11.8)	57.8 (14.3)	56.3 (13.5)	50.5 (10.3)	38.9 (3.8)	30.2 (−1.0)	22.7 (−5.2)	38.8 (3.8)
Average precipitation inches (mm)	1.25 (32)	1.20 (30)	2.37 (60)	3.26 (83)	2.39 (61)	1.81 (46)	3.79 (96)	3.08 (78)	1.73 (44)	1.73 (44)	1.55 (39)	1.21 (31)	25.37 (644)
Average snowfall inches (cm)	18.1 (46)	20.3 (52)	23.9 (61)	21.1 (54)	2.6 (6.6)	0.0 (0.0)	0.0 (0.0)	0.0 (0.0)	0.6 (1.5)	9.1 (23)	13.4 (34)	21.1 (54)	130.2 (331)
Average precipitation days (≥ 0.01 in)	6.4	7.5	8.4	9.7	10.5	8.8	13.8	13.7	8.2	6.8	6.0	6.8	106.6
Average snowy days (≥ 0.1 in)	6.1	7.3	6.9	5.9	1.5	0.0	0.0	0.0	0.3	2.5	4.5	6.5	41.5
Source: NOAA

== Demographics ==
Historical population
Census	Pop.	Note	%±
1940	163		—
1950	166		1.8%
1960	179		7.8%
1970	207		15.6%
1980	232		12.1%
1990	168		−27.6%
2000	202		20.2%
2010	153		−24.3%
2020	206		34.6%

It is part of the Pueblo, Colorado Metropolitan Statistical Area.

As of the census of 2000, there were 202 people, 87 households, and 52 families residing in the town. The population density was 2,016.5 inhabitants per square mile (778.6/km^{2}). There were 119 housing units at an average density of 1,187.9 per square mile (458.7/km^{2}). The racial makeup of the town was 91.09% White, 0.50% African American, 0.50% Native American, 1.49% from other races, and 6.44% from two or more races. Hispanic or Latino of any race were 3.47% of the population.

There were 87 households, out of which 27.6% had children under the age of 18 living with them, 43.7% were married couples living together, 5.7% had a female householder with no husband present, and 39.1% were non-families. 34.5% of all households were made up of individuals, and 14.9% had someone living alone who was 65 years of age or older. The average household size was 2.32 and the average family size was 3.02.

In the town, the population was spread out, with 23.8% under the age of 18, 8.9% from 18 to 24, 23.8% from 25 to 44, 24.3% from 45 to 64, and 19.3% who were 65 years of age or older. The median age was 42 years. For every 100 females, there were 110.4 males. For every 100 females age 18 and over, there were 102.6 males.

The median income for a household in the town was $33,750, and the median income for a family was $43,750. Males had a median income of $21,250 versus $20,625 for females. The per capita income for the town was $15,681. About 7.1% of families and 11.8% of the population were below the poverty line, including 13.3% of those under the age of eighteen and 11.8% of those 65 or over.

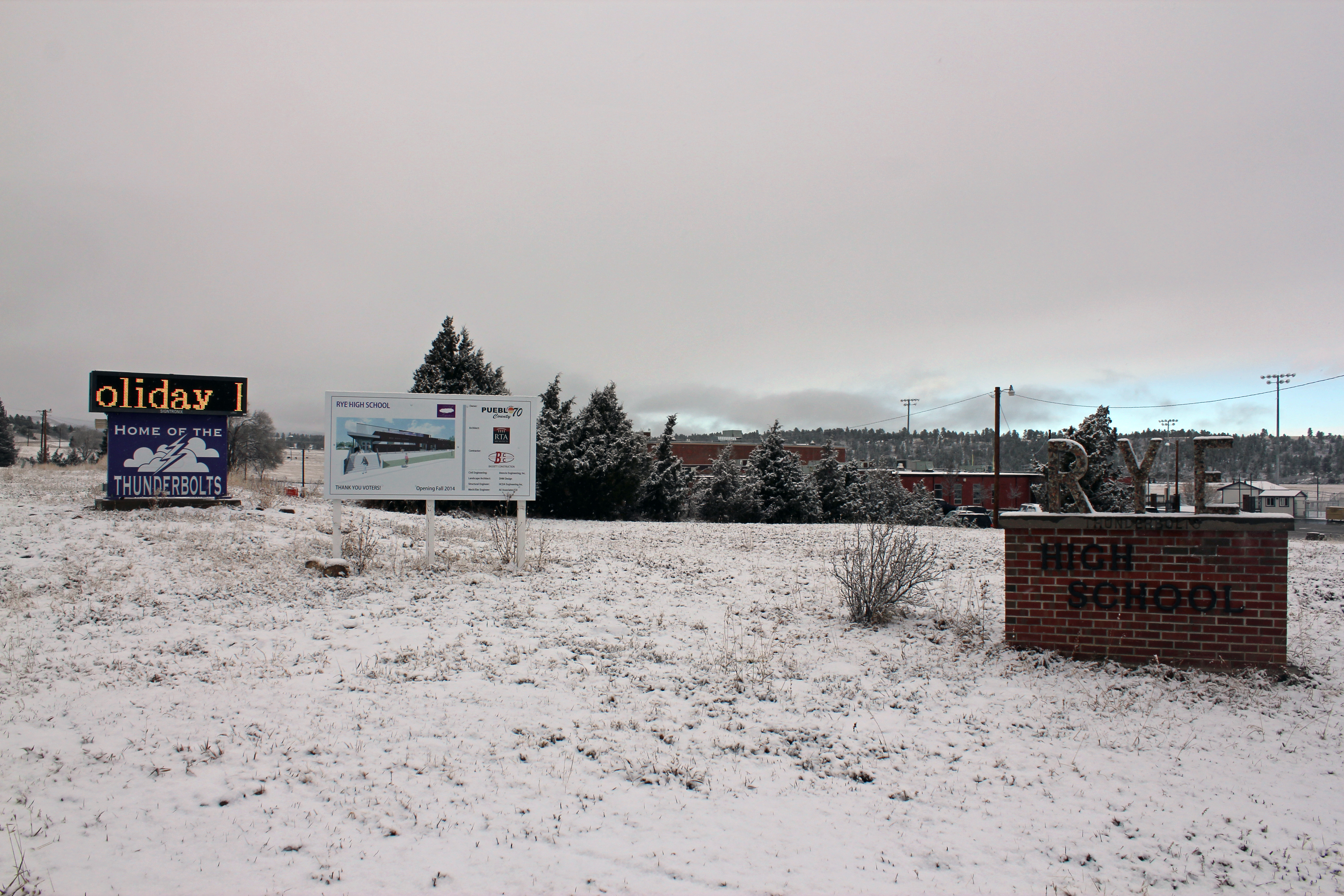
Rye High School, just outside the town limits

== Education ==
Pueblo County School District 70, which covers the municipality, operates public schools, including Rye Elementary School and Rye High School, both near the town limits. The zoned middle school is Craver Middle School, located in neighboring Colorado City.

== See also ==
- Pueblo County, Colorado
- Pueblo, CO Metropolitan Statistical Area
- Bishop Castle
