= Rye High School (Colorado) =

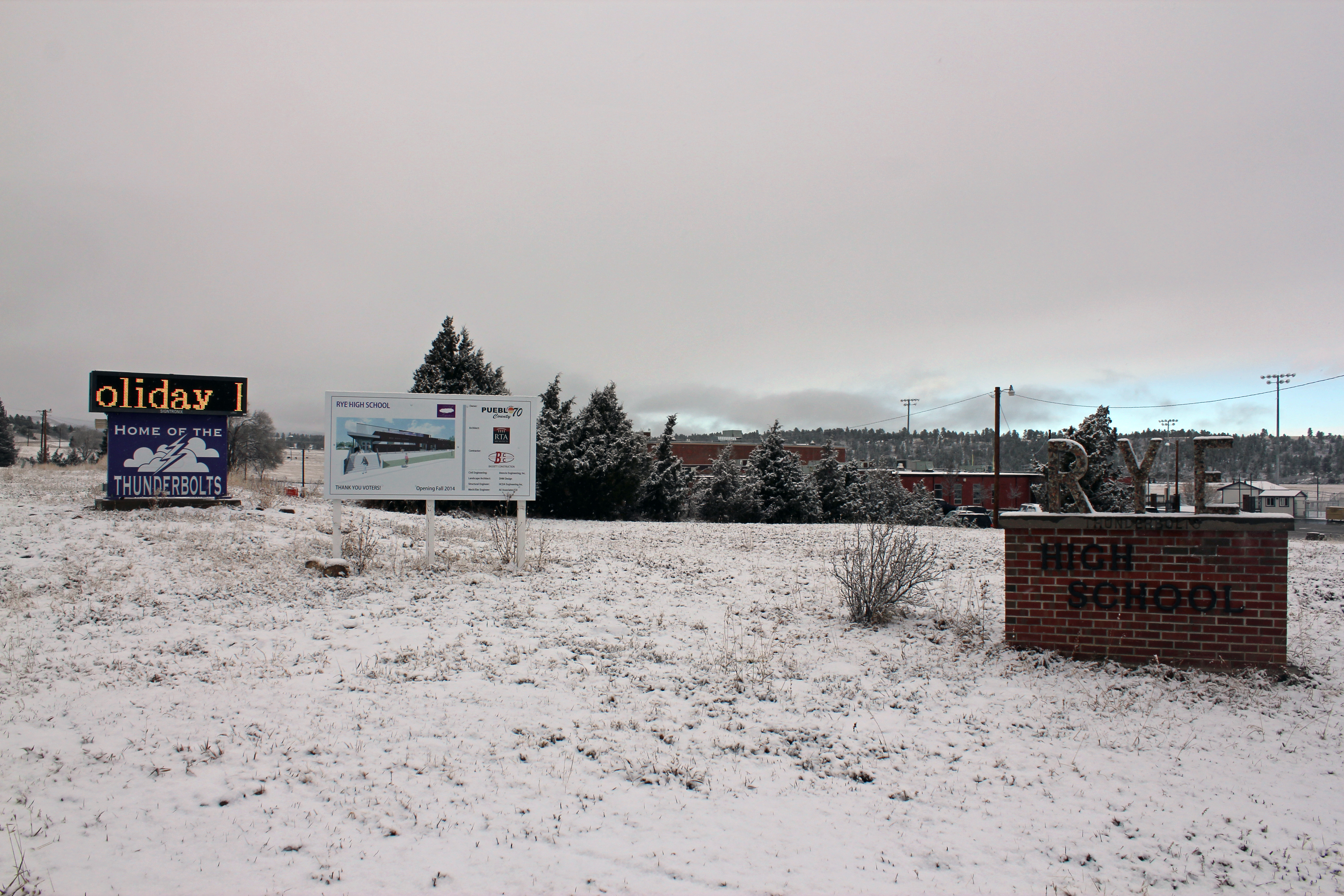
- Signs in front of the school in late 2014

Location
- 1 Thunderbolt Way; Rye, Colorado 81069; United States
- Coordinates: 37°55′31″N 104°55′45″W

Information
- School district: Pueblo County School District 70
- CEEB code: 061240
- NCES School ID: 080615001082
- Principal: Matt DeJong
- Teaching staff: 17.74 (on an FTE basis)
- Grades: 9-12
- Enrollment: 266 (2023-2024)
- Student to teacher ratio: 14.99
- Colours: Purple and white
- Athletics: CHSAA 3A
- Athletics conference: Tri-Peaks League
- Mascot: Thunderbolt
- Website: ryh.district70.org

Rye High School is a public high school in unincorporated Pueblo County, Colorado, United States, near Rye. It is a part of the Pueblo County School District.

As of 2015, the school reported 222 students. The school fields teams in baseball, basketball, cross country, football, golf, soccer, track, volleyball, and wrestling.
