= Pueblo County School District 70 =

School district in Colorado, United States

Address
- 301 28th Lane Pueblo, Colorado, 81001; United States

District information
- Type: Public
- Grades: PreK–12
- NCES District ID: 0806150

Students and staff
- Students: 10,320
- Teachers: 520.01
- Staff: 467.76
- Student–teacher ratio: 19.85

Other information
- Website: www.district70.org

Pueblo County School District 70 (D70) is a school district headquartered in unincorporated Pueblo County, Colorado, near Pueblo.

The district includes the municipalities of Boone and Rye, as well as the census-designated places of Avondale, Beulah Valley, Colorado City, Pueblo West, and Vineland. It also includes most of the Blende CDP and small portions of the municipality of Pueblo.

== History ==
The school district was created in 1950 after 33 school districts consolidated into one. The former Pleasant View High School became the D70 headquarters and, as of 2000, remained as such.

In 2010, the district began holding classes four days per week instead of five.

== Schools ==
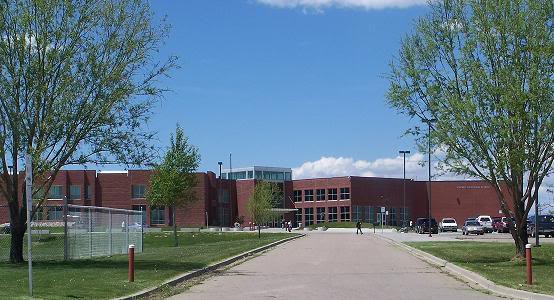
Pueblo West High School

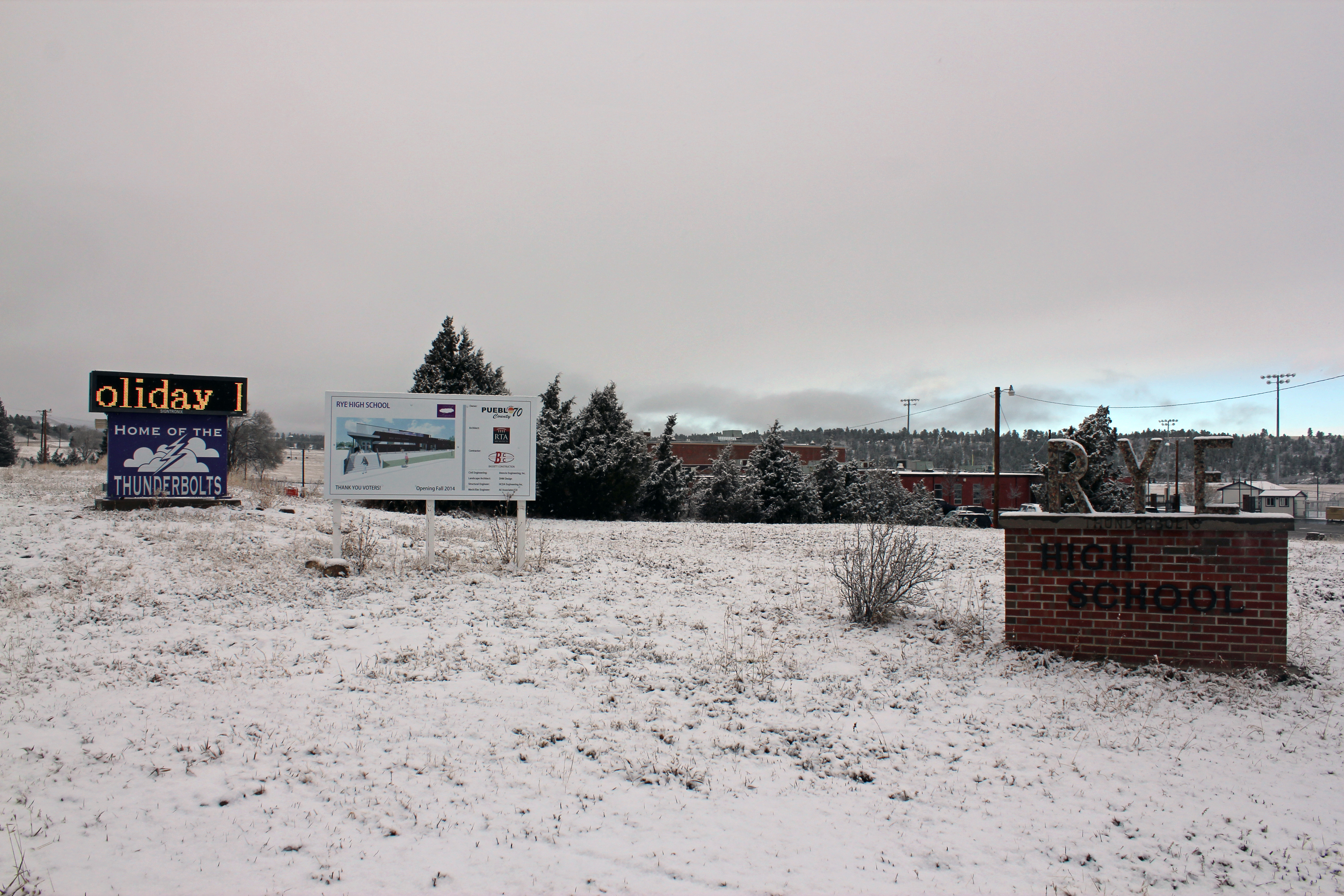
Rye High School

High schools:

- Pueblo County High School (Vineland, in an unincorporated area)
- Pueblo West High School (Pueblo West, in an unincorporated area)
- Rye High School (unincorporated area, near Rye)

K-8 schools:

- Beulah School of Natural Sciences (Beulah)

Middle schools:

- Craver Middle School (Colorado City)
- Pleasant View Middle School
- Liberty Point International School (formerly Pueblo West Middle School) (Pueblo West)
- Skyview Middle School (Pueblo West)
- Vineland Middle School (Vineland)

Elementary schools:

- Avondale Elementary School
- Cedar Ridge Elementary School
- Desert Sage Elementary School
- Liberty Point Elementary School
- North Mesa Elementary School
- Prairie Winds Elementary School
- Rye Elementary School
- South Mesa Elementary School
- Sierra Vista Elementary School
- Vineland Elementary School
