= Pueblo West High School =

Public high school in Pueblo West, Colorado

Location
- 661 West Capistrano Avenue; Pueblo West, Colorado 81007; United States; 38°18′50″N 104°46′24″W

Information
- School type: Public high school
- Established: August 1997; 29 years ago
- School district: Pueblo County 70
- CEEB code: 061203
- NCES School ID: 080615001613
- Principal: Jamison Wagner
- Teaching staff: 73.04 (on an FTE basis)
- Grades: 9–12
- Gender: Coeducational
- Enrollment: 1,503 (2023–24)
- Student to teacher ratio: 20.58
- Campus type: Town, Fringe
- Colors: Carolina blue, black, and white
- Athletics conference: CHSAA
- Mascot: Cyclone
- Website: pwh.district70.org
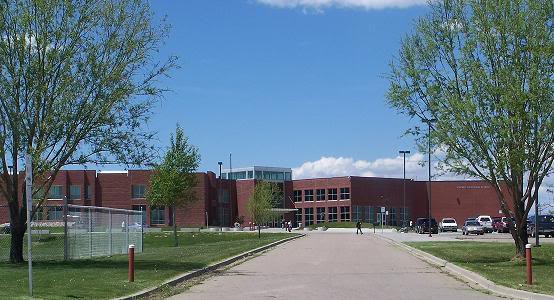

Pueblo West High School is a public high school in Pueblo West, Colorado. It is one of three high schools in Pueblo County School District 70. In the 2023–24 academic year, it enrolled approximately 1,503 students.

Founded in 1997, the school became an International Baccalaureate world school in 2009, offering the IB Diploma Programme.

== Extracurricular activities ==
Pueblo West is a member of the Colorado High School Activities Association (CHSAA) and competes in the CSML Metro league. Their school colors are Carolina blue, black, and white, and their mascot is the cyclone.

=== Athletics ===
The Pueblo West Cyclones have won five 4A state championships. The girls' softball team won back-to-back state championships at the 4A level in 2004 and 2005. The football team brought home the state championship two years later in 2007. The boys' basketball team claimed the championship in 2016, and the boys' baseball team won the state championship in 2019.

=== Esports ===
The school earned the state championship in competitive Mario Kart in 2024, defeating the team from Rocky Mountain High School. The two teams had faced each other the year prior as well, with Pueblo West losing the championship game.
