= Pueblo West, Colorado =

Place in Pueblo County, Colorado, US

- Census-designated place
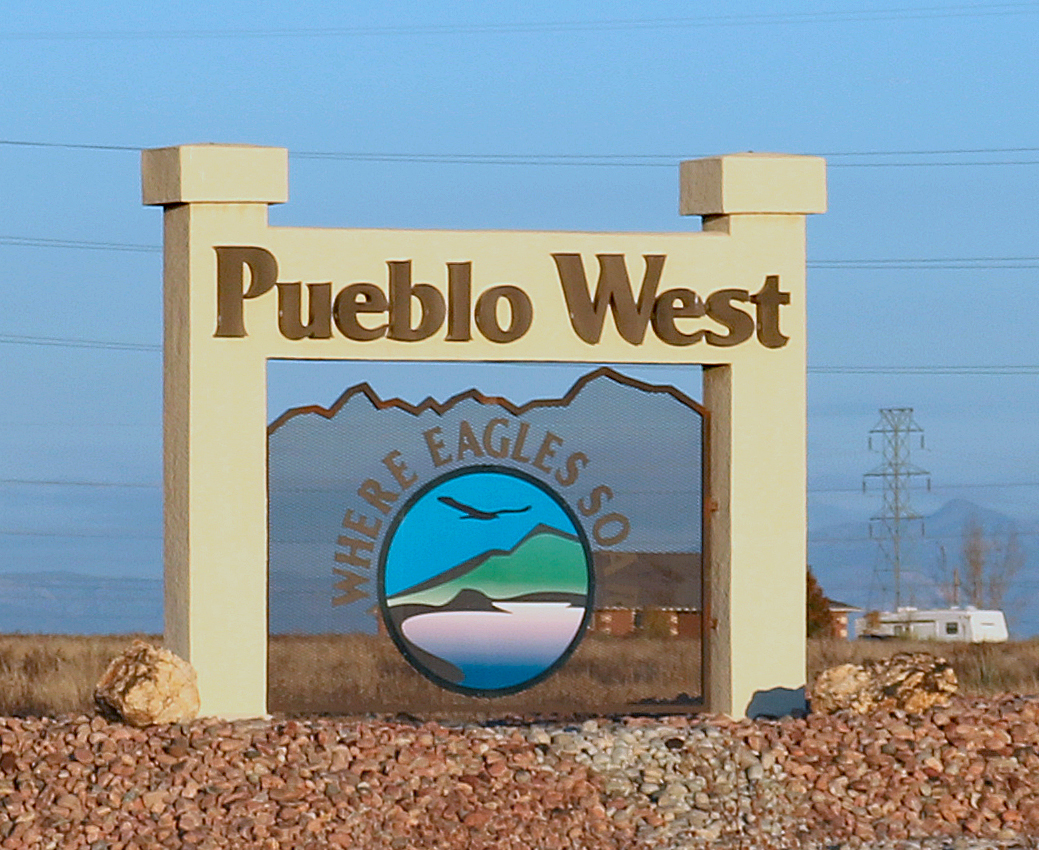

- Flag
- Motto: "Where Eagles Soar"
- Location of the Pueblo West CDP in Pueblo County, Colorado
- Coordinates: 38°20′12″N 104°42′20″W
- Country: United States
- State: Colorado
- County: Pueblo County
- Founded: 1970

Government
  - Type: Metropolitan district

Area
  - Total: 49.708 sq mi (128.744 km^{2})
  - Land: 49.688 sq mi (128.692 km^{2})
  - Water: 0.020 sq mi (0.052 km^{2})
- Elevation: 5,033 ft (1,534 m)

Population (2020)
  - Total: 33,086
  - Density: 665.87/sq mi (257.09/km^{2})
- Time zone: UTC-7 (MST)
  - Summer (DST): UTC-6 (MDT)
- ZIP Code: 81007
- Area code: 719
- GNIS feature ID: 2409109

Pueblo West is a census-designated place (CDP) in and governed by Pueblo County, Colorado, United States. The CDP is part of the Pueblo, CO Metropolitan Statistical Area. The population of the Pueblo West CDP was 33,086 according to the United States Census 2020. The Pueblo West Metropolitan District provides services. The Pueblo post office (Zip Code 81007) serves Pueblo West postal addresses.

== History ==
The area that is now known as Pueblo West was undeveloped rangeland before Robert P. McCulloch, land developer and oil magnate, and his company McCulloch Properties, Inc. came to Colorado. Historically occupied by Ute and Comanche people, most recently the land was used for ranching, supported by the water from the Arkansas River. Inspired by the neighboring City of Pueblo, Colorado, and the momentum of successfully creating Lake Havasu City, Arizona, McCulloch, and his company was formally founded in the Pueblo West Metropolitan District (the District) on September 16, 1969. Shortly after the creation of the District, McCulloch built the Pueblo West Inn, where guests were treated to a luxurious experience to sell land in the rolling prairies of the new community. The Pueblo West News, the District's first newspaper, reported by 1974, over 2,000 new residents had moved into Pueblo West, and Pueblo School District 70 founded Pueblo West Elementary with 200 students enrolling in the fall. In 1977 McCulloch Properties pleaded guilty to criminal fraud for large‐scale land sales misrepresentation.

Since the 1970s, recreational and industrial opportunities were also being founded on Pueblo West property, including the South Equestrian Center, National Horseman's Arena, the Pueblo West Golf and Tennis Club, and manufacturing company Aspen Skiwear, all making use of the area's expansive plains for their ventures. Pueblo West had a population of nearly 4,500 by the early 1980s, requiring the building of Pueblo West Middle School. With developmental opportunities abounding in the North Industrial Park, the economy of the District was growing alongside its residential areas. Following a population boom in the 1990s, several new elementary schools were built, with Pueblo West High School officially opening in 1996. In the early 2000s, a trail system was created along with an additional fire station being built to serve the north side of the District. Pueblo West also entered into the Southern Delivery System, a bilateral agreement to supply water from the Pueblo Reservoir to Colorado Springs. Today, Pueblo West is home to over 30,000 residents and boasts a growing industrial center.

In January 2019, the Pueblo West Metro District Board initiated a feasibility study regarding incorporation.

== Geography ==
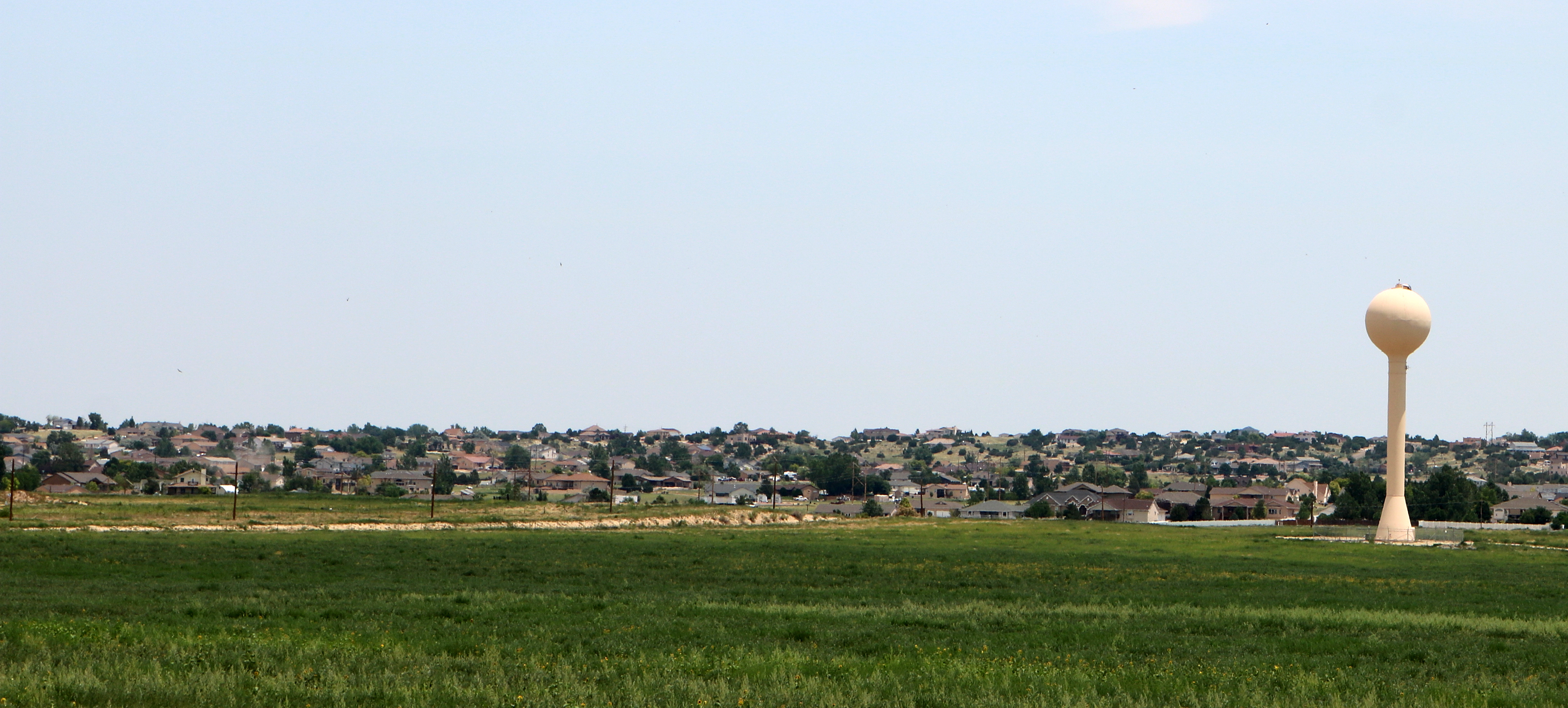
View of the community

Pueblo West is approximately 49 square miles in size and is located along the southern edge of the state's major growth corridor. Situated on Highway 50, roughly 7 miles west of the City of Pueblo and 38 miles east of Cañon City, Pueblo West is bisected by U.S. Route 50, and its northeastern border is adjacent to Interstate 25. Lake Pueblo State Park is situated along the southern boundary of Pueblo West, and the remainder of the community is mostly landlocked by ranch land, conservation easements, and private property.

The Pueblo West CDP has an area of 31,813 acres (128.744 km^{2}), including 13 acres (0.052 km^{2}) of water.

=== Climate ===
(All temperature ranges given are in Fahrenheit degrees)

Pueblo West, located in Southern Colorado, boasts nearly 300 days of sunshine a year. While the temperature tends to be mild and dry, monsoon years can bring higher amounts of rain and cooler summer temperatures. According to the national weather service, the record high summer rainfall for this area was 14.64 inches in 1921, while the record low rainfall was less than an inch during the Dust Bowl in 1939. The 30 year average for summer precipitation is just over 5 inches.

Spring temperatures can fluctuate greatly during the day, with the average highs for March, April, and May typically registering from the 50s to the mid 70s. However, in some years late spring snow storms can dump inches of snow, sometimes in a matter of a few hours. Some years might see light snowfall well into May. Nighttime lows typically range from the 20s to the 40s for these months. Pueblo West is rather windy in general, and particularly windy in the spring.

In the summer, high temperatures typically start out in the 80s-90s range, but can quickly reach 100 or higher. However, the evenings are pleasantly cool, with the average summer low evening temperature being in the 50s to 60s, although occasionally temperatures can drop down into the upper 30s even during the summer.

Fall is often crisp and very dry. September, October, and November typically start out in the 80s and fall through the 70s to reach high temperatures in the 50s during November, although, depending on the year, October or even September can sometimes see the first snowfall. Lows for this time period tend to move from the 50s down into the upper 20s. Frequently these months will also become windier and can exacerbate Red flag warnings for wildfires. Campers and hikers should be aware that campfires are frequently prohibited during these months.

The winter months of December, January, and February see average highs in the 40s and 50s with lows in the 20s. Milder winter temperatures also mean less snowfall, with a yearly average snowfall of 31 inches.

Averages and graphs for the above information can be found here:

== Demographics ==
Pueblo West CDP, Colorado
Year	Pop.	±%
1990	4,386	—
2000	16,899	+285.3%
2010	29,637	+75.4%
2020	33,086	+11.6%
Source: United States Census Bureau

=== 2020 census ===
As of the 2020 census, Pueblo West had a population of 33,086. The median age was 42.0 years. 23.7% of residents were under the age of 18 and 18.9% of residents were 65 years of age or older. For every 100 females there were 101.2 males, and for every 100 females age 18 and over there were 99.1 males age 18 and over.

76.8% of residents lived in urban areas, while 23.2% lived in rural areas.

There were 12,121 households in Pueblo West, of which 32.4% had children under the age of 18 living in them. Of all households, 60.6% were married-couple households, 15.2% were households with a male householder and no spouse or partner present, and 18.0% were households with a female householder and no spouse or partner present. About 19.1% of all households were made up of individuals and 8.7% had someone living alone who was 65 years of age or older.

There were 12,533 housing units, of which 3.3% were vacant. The homeowner vacancy rate was 1.3% and the rental vacancy rate was 4.6%.

Racial composition as of the 2020 census
Race	Number	Percent
White	24,869	75.2%
Black or African American	442	1.3%
American Indian and Alaska Native	434	1.3%
Asian	439	1.3%
Native Hawaiian and Other Pacific Islander	40	0.1%
Some other race	2,073	6.3%
Two or more races	4,789	14.5%
Hispanic or Latino (of any race)	8,418	25.4%

The United States Census Bureau initially defined the Pueblo West CDP for the 1990 United States census.

== Recreation ==
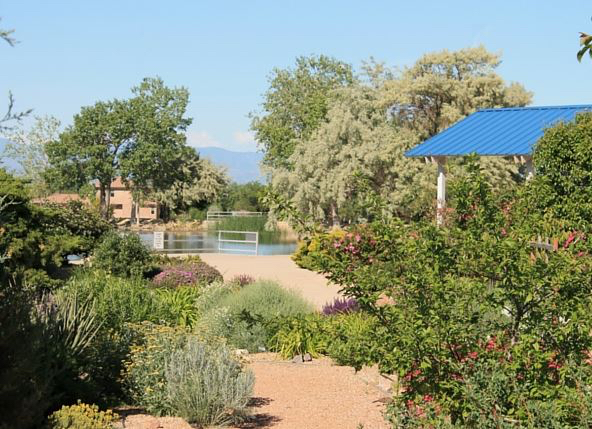
Park in Pueblo West

Lake Pueblo State Park offers fishing, boating, water skiing, hiking, horseback riding, and mountain biking opportunities. Other major attractions, such as the Royal Gorge Bridge and Park, Monarch Mountain, and the Historic Arkansas Riverwalk of Pueblo, are nearby.

== Government ==
The Pueblo West Metropolitan District operates one of the leanest local governments in Colorado and provides services to over 30,000 residents, businesses, and visitors. As a special district form of government, Pueblo West exists to provide services in an unincorporated portion of Pueblo County and is not considered a city. This classification recognizes Pueblo West as a quasi-municipal local government governed by Title 32, Article 1 of the Colorado Revised Statutes. Pueblo West was formed to perform local government functions outlined in the District's service plan. These services include covenant enforcement, fire protection, parks and recreation, public works, and water and wastewater utilities. Law enforcement, planning and zoning, and court services are provided by Pueblo County. In addition, services such as the Health Department, Regional Building Department, and the Pueblo West Library are provided by partnerships between the City of Pueblo and Pueblo County.

The District is governed by a five (5) member Board of Directors, who are elected by registered voters consisting of Pueblo West residents and property owners. Elections for board members occur in May of even years and alternate between two (2) seats and three (3) seats.

Pueblo West lies within Colorado's 3rd U.S. Congressional District. For representation in the Colorado General Assembly, Pueblo West is located in the 46th and 47th districts of the Colorado House of Representatives and the 3rd districts of the Colorado State Senate.

=== Taxes ===
Property taxes serve as the District's primary method of raising general fund revenue, with miscellaneous fees and grants covering the remainder. In 2015, Pueblo West generated $4,337,155 in revenue from property taxes and $1,757,287 in miscellaneous taxes. As an unincorporated special district, Pueblo West is limited in its ability to generate the revenue needed to provide necessary services to its growing population. Of the 3.9% sales tax collected in Pueblo West, 2.9% goes to the State of Colorado, while the remaining 1% goes to Pueblo County.

In November 2015, Pueblo West voters passed a ballot initiative asking for an excise tax on the first transfer of cultivated recreational marijuana within Pueblo West.

In November 2016, Pueblo West voters passed ballot initiative 5A, asking for a Tax Payers Bill of Rights (TABOR) timeout to fund the design, construction, and maintenance of a new community pool and aquatic facility. The TABOR time-out will sunset in 2026.

== Education ==
Pueblo West is entirely within Pueblo County School District 70. It is home to nine District 70 schools and a charter school, including:

=== High schools ===
- Pueblo West High School

=== Middle schools ===
- Liberty Point International (formerly Pueblo West Middle School)
- Skyview Middle School

=== Elementary schools ===
- Liberty Point International (formerly Pueblo West Elementary School)
- Sierra Vista Elementary
- Desert Sage Elementary School
- Prairie Winds Elementary School
- Cedar Ridge Elementary School

=== Charter schools ===
- Swallows Charter Academy High School (Kindergarten through 12th grade)

== Transportation ==
=== Public transport ===
Pueblo West is part of Colorado's Bustang network. It is on the Alamosa-Pueblo Outrider line.

=== Major highways ===
- Interstate 25 (I-25) / U.S. Route 85 (US 85)
- U.S. Route 50 (US 50)

== See also ==
- List of census-designated places in Colorado
