= Avondale, Colorado =

Census-designated place in Pueblo County, Colorado, United States

- Census-designated place
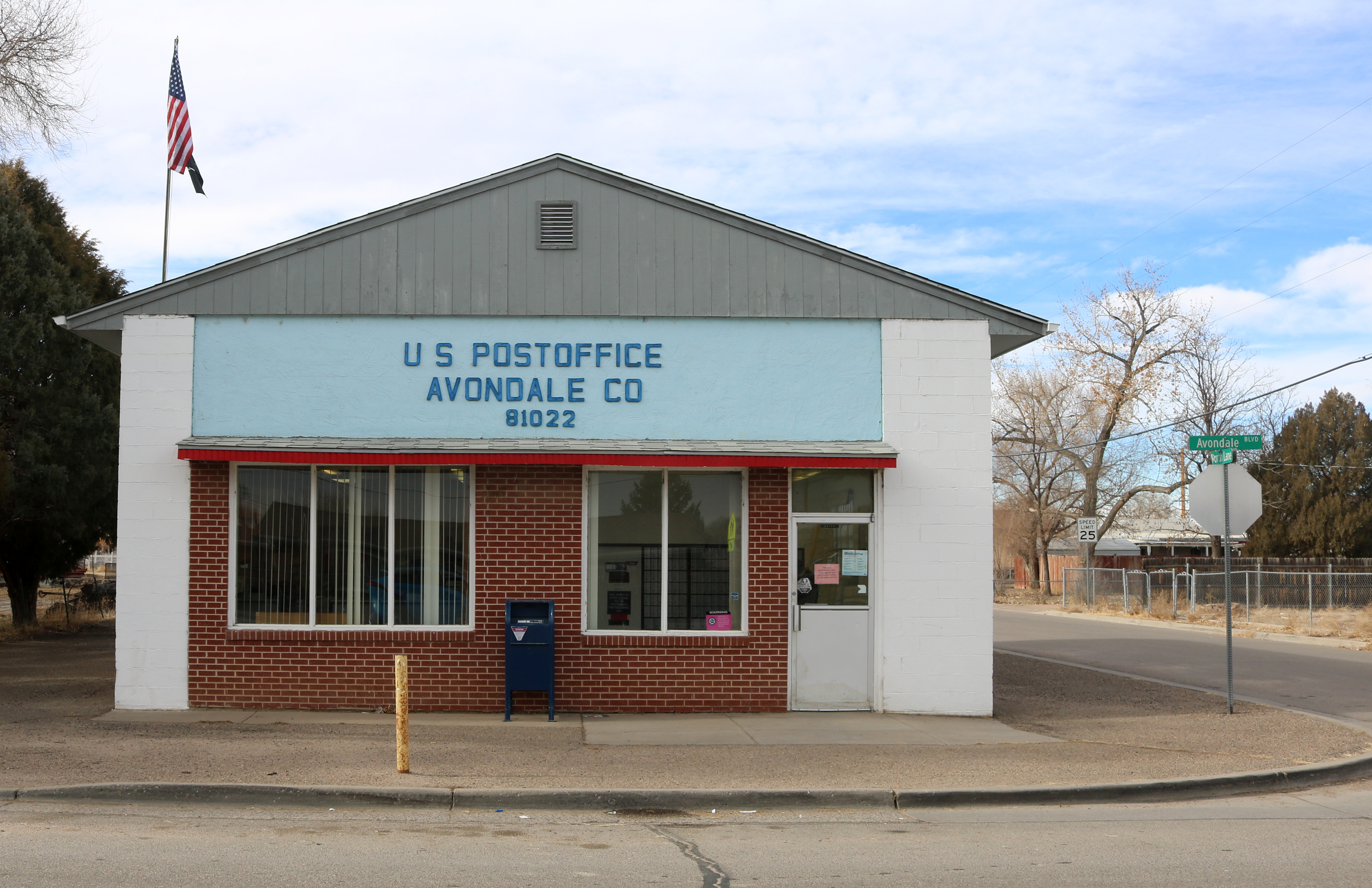
- Avondale post office.

- Location of the Avondale CDP in Pueblo County, Colorado
- Coordinates: 38°14′07″N 104°20′54″W
- Country: United States
- State: Colorado
- County: Pueblo

Government
  - Type: Unincorporated community
  - Body: Pueblo County

Area
  - Total: 0.628 sq mi (1.627 km^{2})
  - Land: 0.628 sq mi (1.627 km^{2})
  - Water: 0 sq mi (0.000 km^{2})
- Elevation: 4,557 ft (1,389 m)

Population (2020)
  - Total: 594
  - Density: 946/sq mi (365/km^{2})
- Time zone: UTC−07:00 (MST)
  - Summer (DST): UTC−06:00 (MDT)
- ZIP Code: 81022
- Area code: 719
- GNIS CDP ID: 2407788
- FIPS code: 08 04165

Avondale is a census-designated place (CDP) and post office located in Pueblo County, Colorado, United States. The CDP is a part of the Pueblo, CO Metropolitan Statistical Area. The Avondale post office has the ZIP Code 81022. At the United States Census 2020, the population of the Avondale CDP was 594, while the population of the 81022 ZIP Code Tabulation Area was 1,624 including adjacent areas.

== History ==
The Avondale, Colorado, post office opened on March 22, 1892. The name Avondale is derived from Stratford-upon-Avon.

== Geography ==
At the 2020 United States census, the Avondale CDP had an area of 402 acres (1.627 km^{2}), all land.

== Demographics ==
Avondale CDP, Colorado
Year	Pop.	±%
2000	754	—
2010	674	−10.6%
2020	594	−11.9%
Source: United States Census Bureau

The United States Census Bureau initially defined the Avondale CDP for the United States Census 2000.

== Education ==
It is in the Pueblo County School District 70. Zoned schools include Avondale Elementary School, Vineland Middle School, and Pueblo County High School.

Avondale was first zoned to Pueblo County High in 1953. Prior to that year, its high school was Avondale High School.

== See also ==
- Pueblo, CO Metropolitan Statistical Area
