= Pueblo County, Colorado =

County in Colorado, United States

- County
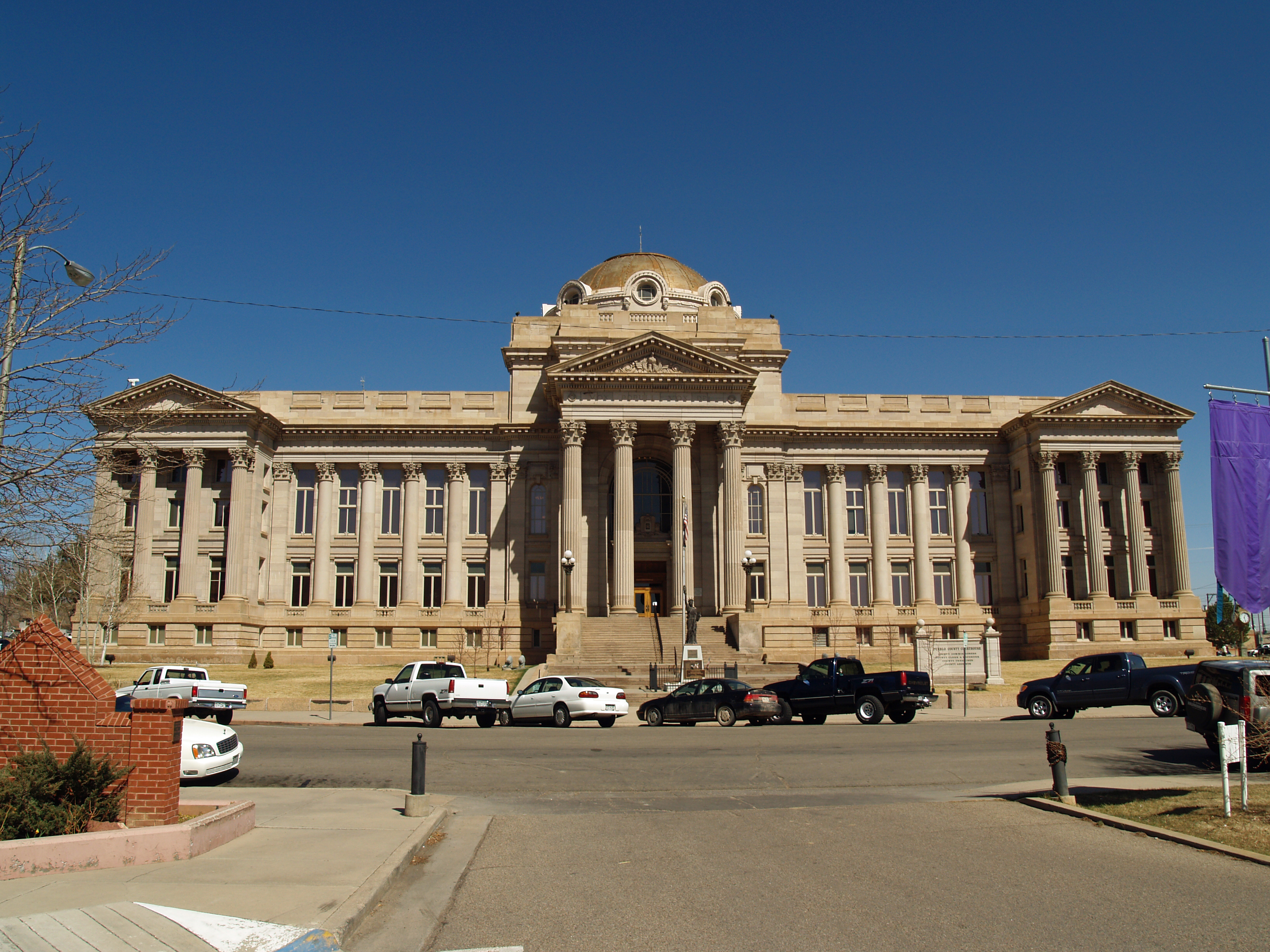
- The Pueblo County Courthouse with brass dome in Pueblo

- Seal

- Location within the U.S. state of Colorado
- Coordinates: 38.15°N 104.51°W
- Country: United States
- State: Colorado
- Founded: November 1, 1861
- Named for: City of Pueblo
- Seat: Pueblo
- Largest city: Pueblo

Area
  - Total: 2,398 sq mi (6,210 km^{2})
  - Land: 2,386 sq mi (6,180 km^{2})
  - Water: 12 sq mi (31 km^{2}) 0.5%

Population (2020)
  - Total: 168,162
  - Estimate (2025): 169,277 ▲
  - Density: 70.48/sq mi (27.21/km^{2})
- Time zone: UTC−7 (Mountain)
  - Summer (DST): UTC−6 (MDT)
- Congressional district: 3rd
- Website: county.pueblo.org

Pueblo County (/ˈpwɛbloʊ/ or /ˈpjɛbloʊ/) is a county located in the U.S. state of Colorado. As of the 2020 census, the population was 168,162. The county seat is Pueblo. The county was named for the historic city of Pueblo which took its name from the Spanish language word meaning "town" or "village". Pueblo County comprises the Pueblo, CO Metropolitan Statistical Area.

== Geography ==
According to the U.S. Census Bureau, the county has a total area of 2,398 square miles (6,210 km^{2}), of which 2,386 square miles (6,180 km^{2}) is land and 12 square miles (31 km^{2}) (0.5%) is water.

=== Adjacent counties ===
- El Paso County - north
- Lincoln County - northeast
- Crowley County - east
- Otero County - east
- Las Animas County - south
- Huerfano County - southwest
- Custer County - west
- Fremont County - northwest

=== Major highways ===
- I-25 / US 85 / US 87
- US 50
- SH 10
- SH 45
- SH 47
- SH 78
- SH 96
- SH 120
- SH 165
- SH 167

=== National protected areas ===
- San Isabel National Forest
- Greenhorn Mountain Wilderness

=== Trails and byways ===
- American Discovery Trail
- Frontier Pathways National Scenic and Historic Byway
- TransAmerica Trail Bicycle Route
- Western Express Bicycle Route

== Demographics ==
Historical population
| Census | Pop. | Note | %± |
|---|---|---|---|
| 1870 | 2,265 | | — |
| 1880 | 7,167 | | 216.4% |
| 1890 | 31,191 | | 335.2% |
| 1900 | 34,418 | | 10.3% |
| 1910 | 52,223 | | 51.7% |
| 1920 | 57,368 | | 9.9% |
| 1930 | 66,033 | | 15.1% |
| 1940 | 68,870 | | 4.3% |
| 1950 | 90,188 | | 31.0% |
| 1960 | 118,685 | | 31.6% |
| 1970 | 118,238 | | −0.4% |
| 1980 | 120,984 | | 2.3% |
| 1990 | 123,051 | | 1.7% |
| 2000 | 141,472 | | 15.0% |
| 2010 | 159,063 | | 12.4% |
| 2020 | 168,162 | | 5.7% |
| 2025 (est.) | 169,277 | ▲ | 0.7% |
U.S. Decennial Census; 1790-1960 1900-1990; 1990-2000 2010-2020

=== 2020 census ===
As of the 2020 census, the county had a population of 168,162. Of the residents, 22.2% were under the age of 18 and 19.7% were 65 years of age or older; the median age was 40.8 years. For every 100 females there were 97.6 males, and for every 100 females age 18 and over there were 95.5 males. 86.9% of residents lived in urban areas and 13.1% lived in rural areas.

Pueblo County, Colorado – Racial and ethnic composition Note: the US Census treats Hispanic/Latino as an ethnic category. This table excludes Latinos from the racial categories and assigns them to a separate category. Hispanics/Latinos may be of any race.
| Race / Ethnicity (NH = Non-Hispanic) | Pop 2000 | Pop 2010 | Pop 2020 | % 2000 | % 2010 | % 2020 |
|---|---|---|---|---|---|---|
| White alone (NH) | 81,624 | 86,054 | 85,527 | 57.70% | 54.10% | 50.86% |
| Black or African American alone (NH) | 2,391 | 2,646 | 2,995 | 1.69% | 1.66% | 1.78% |
| Native American or Alaska Native alone (NH) | 917 | 985 | 1,246 | 0.65% | 0.62% | 0.74% |
| Asian alone (NH) | 847 | 1,123 | 1,562 | 0.60% | 0.71% | 0.93% |
| Pacific Islander alone (NH) | 58 | 111 | 138 | 0.04% | 0.07% | 0.08% |
| Other race alone (NH) | 219 | 264 | 944 | 0.15% | 0.17% | 0.56% |
| Mixed race or Multiracial (NH) | 1,706 | 2,069 | 5,829 | 1.21% | 1.30% | 3.47% |
| Hispanic or Latino (any race) | 53,710 | 65,811 | 69,921 | 37.96% | 41.37% | 41.58% |
| Total | 141,472 | 159,063 | 168,162 | 100.00% | 100.00% | 100.00% |

The racial makeup of the county was 64.7% White, 2.2% Black or African American, 2.3% American Indian and Alaska Native, 1.0% Asian, 0.1% Native Hawaiian and Pacific Islander, 12.0% from some other race, and 17.7% from two or more races. Hispanic or Latino residents of any race comprised 41.6% of the population.

There were 67,095 households in the county, of which 28.6% had children under the age of 18 living with them and 28.5% had a female householder with no spouse or partner present. About 29.7% of all households were made up of individuals and 13.5% had someone living alone who was 65 years of age or older.

There were 71,981 housing units, of which 6.8% were vacant. Among occupied housing units, 66.2% were owner-occupied and 33.8% were renter-occupied. The homeowner vacancy rate was 1.6% and the rental vacancy rate was 6.3%.

As of the Census 2007 statistical update, there were 154,712 people, 59,956 households, and 40,084 families living in the county. The population density was 59 people per square mile (23 people/km^{2}). There were 67,314 housing units at an average density of 25 units per square mile (9.7 units/km^{2}). The racial makeup of the county was 79.47% White, 1.90% Black or African American, 1.59% Native American, 0.65% Asian, 0.07% Pacific Islander, 12.93% from other races, and 3.38% from two or more races. 37.97% of the population were Hispanic or Latino of any race. 11.6% were of German, 8.8% Italian, 6.7% English, 6.6% American and 6.5% Irish ancestry.

There were 59,956 households, out of which 31.50% had children under the age of 18 living with them, 50.10% were married couples living together, 13.30% had a female householder with no husband present, and 31.60% were non-families. 26.60% of all households were made up of individuals, and 11.10% had someone living alone who was 65 years of age or older. The average household size was 2.52 and the average family size was 3.04.

In the county, the population was spread out, with 25.80% under the age of 18, 9.40% from 18 to 24, 27.20% from 25 to 44, 22.40% from 45 to 64, and 15.20% who were 65 years of age or older. The median age was 37 years. For every 100 females there were 95.80 males. For every 100 females age 18 and over, there were 92.50 males.

The median income for a household in the county was $41,283, and the median income for a family was $50,143. The per capita income for the county was $21,656. About 11.20% of families and 14.90% of the population were below the poverty line, including 19.70% of those under age 18 and 8.70% of those age 65 or over.

== Government ==
Elected Officials:
| Commissioner, District 1 | Miles Lucero |
| Commissioner, District 2 | Paula McPheeters |
| Commissioner, District 3 | Zach Swearingen |
| Assessor | Frank Beltran |
| Clerk and Recorder | Candace Rivera |
| Sheriff | Dave Lucero |
| County Surveyor | Randy Reeves |
| Treasurer | Kim Archuletta |
| Coroner | Brian Cotter |

The Board of Pueblo County Commissioners is elected by voters to represent three individual districts within Pueblo County. The board serves as the administrative and policy-setting authority for Pueblo County.

Pueblo County is coterminous with the 10th Judicial District which is represented by District Attorney Kala Beauvais.

Pueblo County is part of Colorado's 3rd congressional district and is represented by U.S. House member Jeff Hurd.

At the state level the following representatives have boundaries that cover parts of Pueblo County: Nick Hinrichsen representing Senate District 3, Tisha Mauro House representing House District 46, Ty Winter representing District 47, Stephanie Luck representing District 60 and Matt Martinez representing District 62.

=== Law enforcement ===
The sheriff's office is responsible for law enforcement and fire protection for unincorporated area in the county. As of 2022, the department had 362 sworn members.

== Politics ==
Pueblo County is historically a Democratic stronghold; however, in the 2016 presidential election, the county voted for Republican nominee Donald Trump. It was brought back into the Democratic fold in the years which followed, voting for Jared Polis in the 2018 gubernatorial election and giving Joe Biden a plurality in the 2020 presidential election, although Biden's margin of victory of 1.7 percent was much reduced from Barack Obama's 14 percent margin in 2012. The county flipped back Republican in the 2024 presidential election, this time with a full majority.

United States presidential election results for Pueblo County, Colorado
| Year | Republican | | Democratic | | Third party(ies) | |
| Year | No. | % | No. | % | No. | % |
|---|---|---|---|---|---|---|
| 1880 | 824 | 48.93% | 860 | 51.07% | 0 | 0.00% |
| 1884 | 1,784 | 53.88% | 1,449 | 43.76% | 78 | 2.36% |
| 1888 | 2,280 | 51.14% | 2,038 | 45.72% | 140 | 3.14% |
| 1892 | 2,404 | 46.06% | 0 | 0.00% | 2,815 | 53.94% |
| 1896 | 1,318 | 13.44% | 8,373 | 85.39% | 115 | 1.17% |
| 1900 | 6,028 | 49.56% | 5,878 | 48.32% | 258 | 2.12% |
| 1904 | 9,173 | 55.72% | 6,966 | 42.31% | 324 | 1.97% |
| 1908 | 7,337 | 46.04% | 8,092 | 50.77% | 508 | 3.19% |
| 1912 | 3,050 | 19.64% | 7,643 | 49.20% | 4,840 | 31.16% |
| 1916 | 6,545 | 36.08% | 10,710 | 59.04% | 886 | 4.88% |
| 1920 | 9,621 | 53.13% | 7,863 | 43.42% | 625 | 3.45% |
| 1924 | 10,577 | 52.86% | 4,917 | 24.57% | 4,515 | 22.56% |
| 1928 | 15,541 | 65.65% | 7,881 | 33.29% | 251 | 1.06% |
| 1932 | 10,414 | 39.52% | 15,325 | 58.15% | 615 | 2.33% |
| 1936 | 10,071 | 34.46% | 18,660 | 63.85% | 493 | 1.69% |
| 1940 | 14,185 | 42.84% | 18,805 | 56.79% | 125 | 0.38% |
| 1944 | 13,848 | 41.99% | 19,039 | 57.72% | 96 | 0.29% |
| 1948 | 12,756 | 36.40% | 21,637 | 61.75% | 648 | 1.85% |
| 1952 | 20,333 | 48.81% | 20,613 | 49.48% | 713 | 1.71% |
| 1956 | 23,454 | 52.34% | 20,433 | 45.60% | 927 | 2.07% |
| 1960 | 20,579 | 42.36% | 27,421 | 56.44% | 582 | 1.20% |
| 1964 | 13,103 | 27.00% | 34,933 | 71.97% | 500 | 1.03% |
| 1968 | 16,646 | 34.47% | 27,215 | 56.36% | 4,430 | 9.17% |
| 1972 | 25,607 | 54.43% | 19,620 | 41.70% | 1,818 | 3.86% |
| 1976 | 18,518 | 41.02% | 25,841 | 57.24% | 784 | 1.74% |
| 1980 | 20,770 | 44.72% | 21,874 | 47.10% | 3,797 | 8.18% |
| 1984 | 24,634 | 47.19% | 27,126 | 51.97% | 440 | 0.84% |
| 1988 | 20,119 | 37.73% | 32,788 | 61.50% | 411 | 0.77% |
| 1992 | 16,120 | 28.56% | 30,261 | 53.62% | 10,057 | 17.82% |
| 1996 | 17,402 | 34.60% | 28,791 | 57.24% | 4,108 | 8.17% |
| 2000 | 22,827 | 42.31% | 28,888 | 53.55% | 2,231 | 4.14% |
| 2004 | 31,117 | 46.31% | 35,369 | 52.64% | 701 | 1.04% |
| 2008 | 30,257 | 41.78% | 41,097 | 56.74% | 1,073 | 1.48% |
| 2012 | 31,894 | 41.74% | 42,551 | 55.68% | 1,974 | 2.58% |
| 2016 | 36,265 | 46.11% | 35,875 | 45.62% | 6,506 | 8.27% |
| 2020 | 42,252 | 47.85% | 43,772 | 49.57% | 2,277 | 2.58% |
| 2024 | 43,688 | 51.33% | 39,328 | 46.20% | 2,104 | 2.47% |

United States Senate election results for Pueblo County, Colorado2
| Year | Republican | | Democratic | | Third party(ies) | |
| Year | No. | % | No. | % | No. | % |
|---|---|---|---|---|---|---|
| 2020 | 42,098 | 48.14% | 42,791 | 48.93% | 2,561 | 2.93% |

United States Senate election results for Pueblo County, Colorado3
| Year | Republican | | Democratic | | Third party(ies) | |
| Year | No. | % | No. | % | No. | % |
|---|---|---|---|---|---|---|
| 2022 | 29,453 | 43.76% | 35,581 | 52.86% | 2,275 | 3.38% |

Colorado Gubernatorial election results for Pueblo County
| Year | Republican | | Democratic | | Third party(ies) | |
| Year | No. | % | No. | % | No. | % |
|---|---|---|---|---|---|---|
| 2022 | 28,645 | 42.43% | 36,602 | 54.22% | 2,265 | 3.35% |

== Communities ==
=== City ===
- Pueblo

=== Towns ===
- Boone
- Rye

=== Census-designated places ===
- Avondale
- Beulah Valley
- Blende
- Colorado City
- Pueblo West
- Salt Creek
- Vineland

== Education ==
School districts serving the county include:

- Pueblo School District 60
- Pueblo County School District 70
- Edison School District 54-JT
- Fowler School District R-4J

Pueblo County has thirteen high schools.

== Recreation ==
- Rosemount Museum
- Sangre de Cristo Arts and Conference Center
- Buell Children's Museum
- El Pueblo History Museum
- Pueblo Weisbrod Aircraft Museum
- Steelworks Museum
- Lake Pueblo State Park
- Nature and Wildlife Discovery Center
- Pueblo Zoo
- Pueblo City Park Carousel
- Arkansas River kayak course
- Historic Arkansas Riverwalk
- Union Avenue Historic Commercial District
- Pueblo City-County Library District

== See also ==
- Bibliography of Colorado
- Geography of Colorado
  - Saint Charles Reservoir
- History of Colorado
  - Arapahoe County, Kansas Territory
  - El Paso County, Jefferson Territory
  - National Register of Historic Places listings in Pueblo County, Colorado
- Index of Colorado-related articles
- List of Colorado-related lists
  - List of counties in Colorado
  - List of statistical areas in Colorado
- Outline of Colorado
  - Front Range Urban Corridor
