= Blende, Colorado =

Census-designated place in Pueblo County, Colorado, United States

- Census-designated place
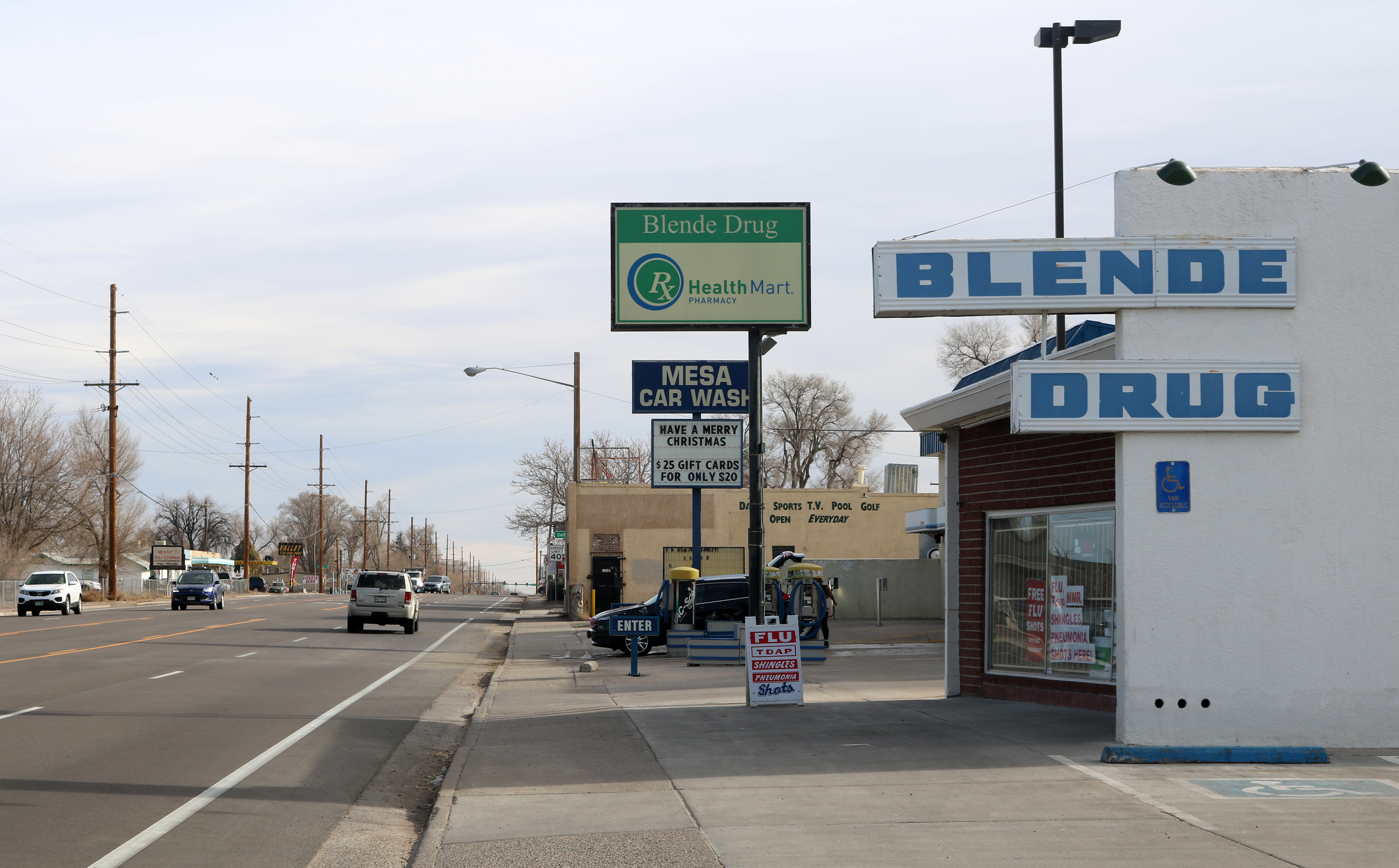
- Looking east along Santa Fe Drive in Blende.

- Location of the Blende CDP in Pueblo County, Colorado
- Coordinates: 38°14′56″N 104°34′11″W
- Country: United States
- State: Colorado
- County: Pueblo

Government
  - Type: Unincorporated community
  - Body: Pueblo County

Area
  - Total: 0.839 sq mi (2.172 km^{2})
  - Land: 0.839 sq mi (2.172 km^{2})
  - Water: 0.00015 sq mi (0.0004 km^{2})
- Elevation: 4,738 ft (1,444 m)

Population (2020)
  - Total: 788
  - Density: 940/sq mi (363/km^{2})
- Time zone: UTC−07:00 (MST)
  - Summer (DST): UTC−06:00 (MDT)
- ZIP Code: Pueblo 81006
- Area code: 719
- GNIS CDP ID: 2583212
- FIPS code: FIPS 08 07245

Blende is an unincorporated community and a census-designated place (CDP) in Pueblo County, Colorado, United States. The CDP is a part of the Pueblo, CO Metropolitan Statistical Area. The population of the Blende CDP was 788 at the United States Census 2020. Blende has never had a post office, but the Pueblo post office (Zip Code 81006) serves the area.

== Geography ==
At the 2020 United States Census, the Blende CDP had an area of 537 acres (2.172 km^{2}), including 0.01 acre (0.0004 km^{2}) of water.

== Demographics ==
Blende CDP, Colorado
Year	Pop.	±%
2010	878	—
2020	788	−10.3%
Source: United States Census Bureau

The United States Census Bureau initially defined the Blende CDP for the United States Census 2010.

== Education ==
The majority of the CDP is in the Pueblo County School District 70 while a piece is in Pueblo School District 60.

In regards to the portions in District 70, North Mesa and South Mesa elementary schools take portions of Blende CDP. All of Blende in District 70 is zoned to Pleasant View Middle School and Pueblo County High School.

Blende was first zoned to Pueblo County High in 1953. Previously a Blende elementary school existed, and the area high school was, in the pre-1953 period, Pleasant View High School. A junior high school co-located with Pleasant View High received students from the respective age group.

== See also ==
- Front Range Urban Corridor
- Pueblo, CO Metropolitan Statistical Area
