= Pueblo Zoo =

Zoo in Pueblo, Colorado, United States

- Interactive map of Pueblo Zoo
- 38.2617°N 104.6581°W
- Location: 3455 Nuckolls Avenue, Pueblo, Colorado, United States
- Land area: 30 acres (12.1 ha)
- No. of animals: 500+
- No. of species: 125+
- Memberships: AZA
- Website: www.pueblozoo.org
- Pueblo City Park Zoo
- U.S. National Register of Historic Places
- U.S. Historic district
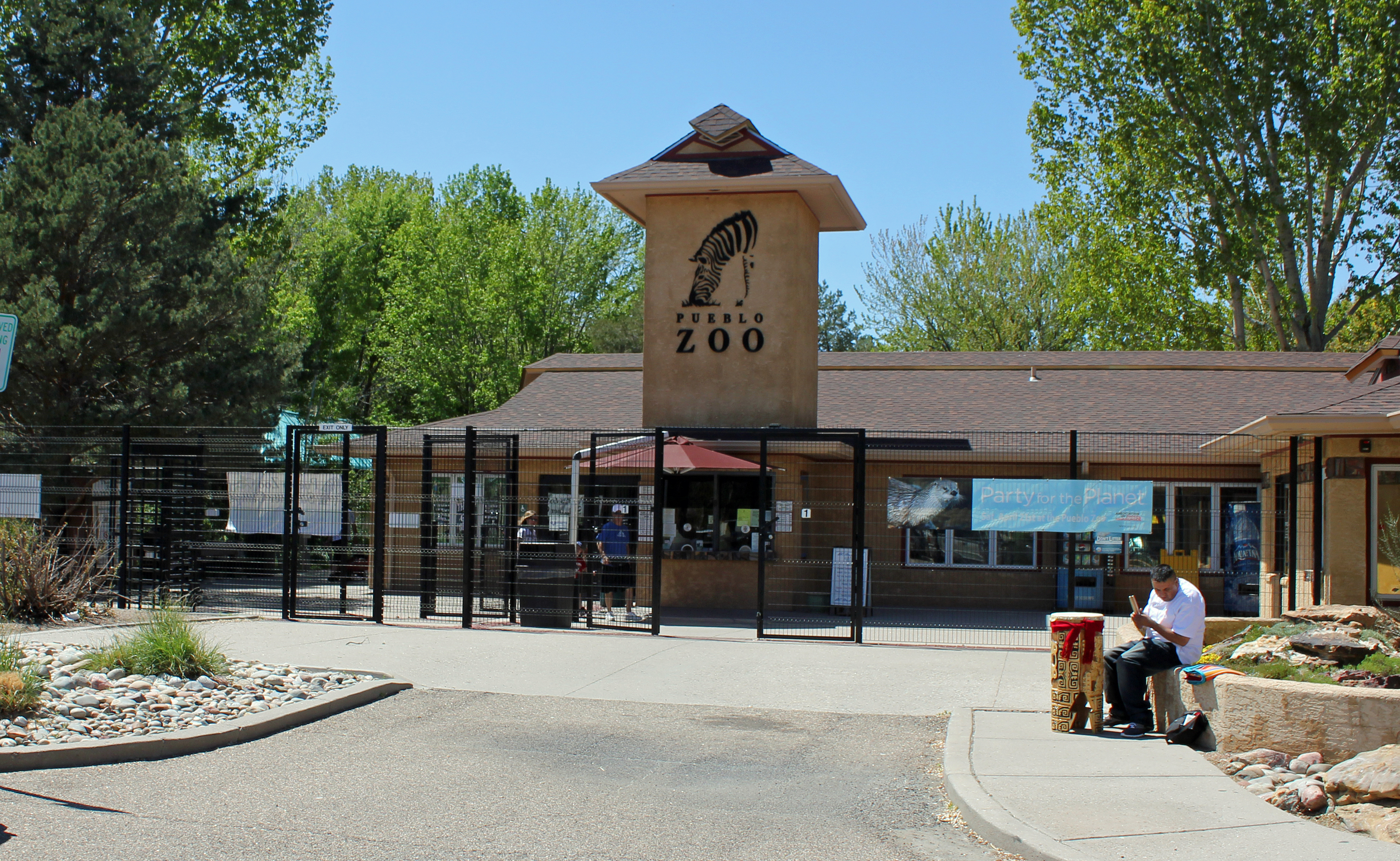
- Pueblo City Park Zoo entrance.

- Location within Colorado
- Coordinates: 38°15′42.12″N 104°39′29.16″W
- Area: 2.5 acres (1.0 ha)
- Built: 1933-1940
- Architect: Elliott, S. F., et al. Works Progress Administration
- Architectural style: Late 19th & early 20th c. American movements
- NRHP reference No.: 95000934
- Added to NRHP: July 28, 1995

Pueblo Zoo is a 25-acre (10.1 ha) zoo located in Pueblo, Colorado in the United States. The zoo is open year-round and is home to over 500 animals of more than 125 species. The Pueblo Zoological Society manages the zoo, which is accredited by the Association of Zoos and Aquariums (AZA).

== History ==
The original core of the zoo was built in 1933–1940 by the Public Works Administration, Civilian Conservation Corps, and Works Progress Administration and is listed on the National Register of Historic Places as the Pueblo City Park Zoo.

== Exhibits ==
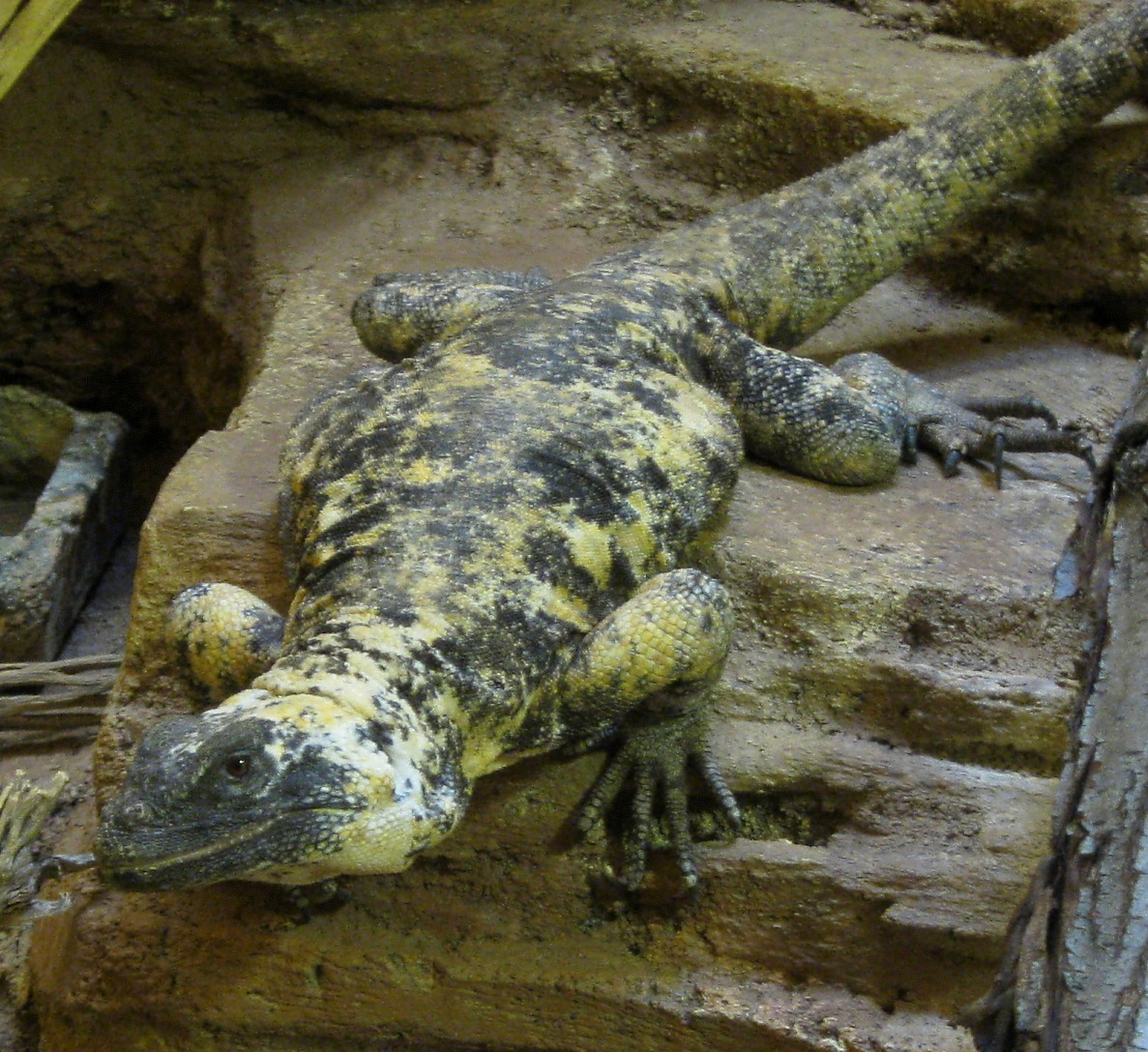
San Esteban chuckwalla (Sauromalus varius).

Major exhibits include Serengeti Safari, North American Grasslands, Colorado Wetlands, the Australian Outback, World of Color (formerly the Herpetarium,) Asian Adventure, the Ecocenter, Islands of Life and Pioneer Ranch.

Serengeti Safari includes lions, Grevy's zebras, plains zebras, topi antelopes, nyalas, ostriches, Thomson's gazelles, East African crowned cranes, lappet-faced vultures, white storks, and waterbucks. This exhibit currently includes African wild dogs.

In the Australian Outback, visitors can see emus and red kangaroos from Australia, as well as the maned wolf from South America.

Asian Adventure includes Przewalski's horses, white handed gibbons, yaks, binturongs, kulans, Reeves's muntjac, and Malayan sun bears.

Colorado Wetlands features animals such as the Rocky Mountain elk, Plains bison, white pelicans, trumpeter swans, North American wood ducks, black tailed prairie dogs, and swift foxes.

At Pioneer Ranch, guests can see animals that might live on a ranch, including cows, donkeys, miniature horses, alpacas, both dromedary and Bactrian camels, goats, hogs, sheep, llamas, owls, snakes, turkeys, chickens, rabbits, goose, ducks, and tortoises.

== Conservation ==
The Pueblo Zoo participated in the AZA Species Survival Plans for 16 species and in the Population Management Plans for 18 species as of 2009.

== Gallery ==
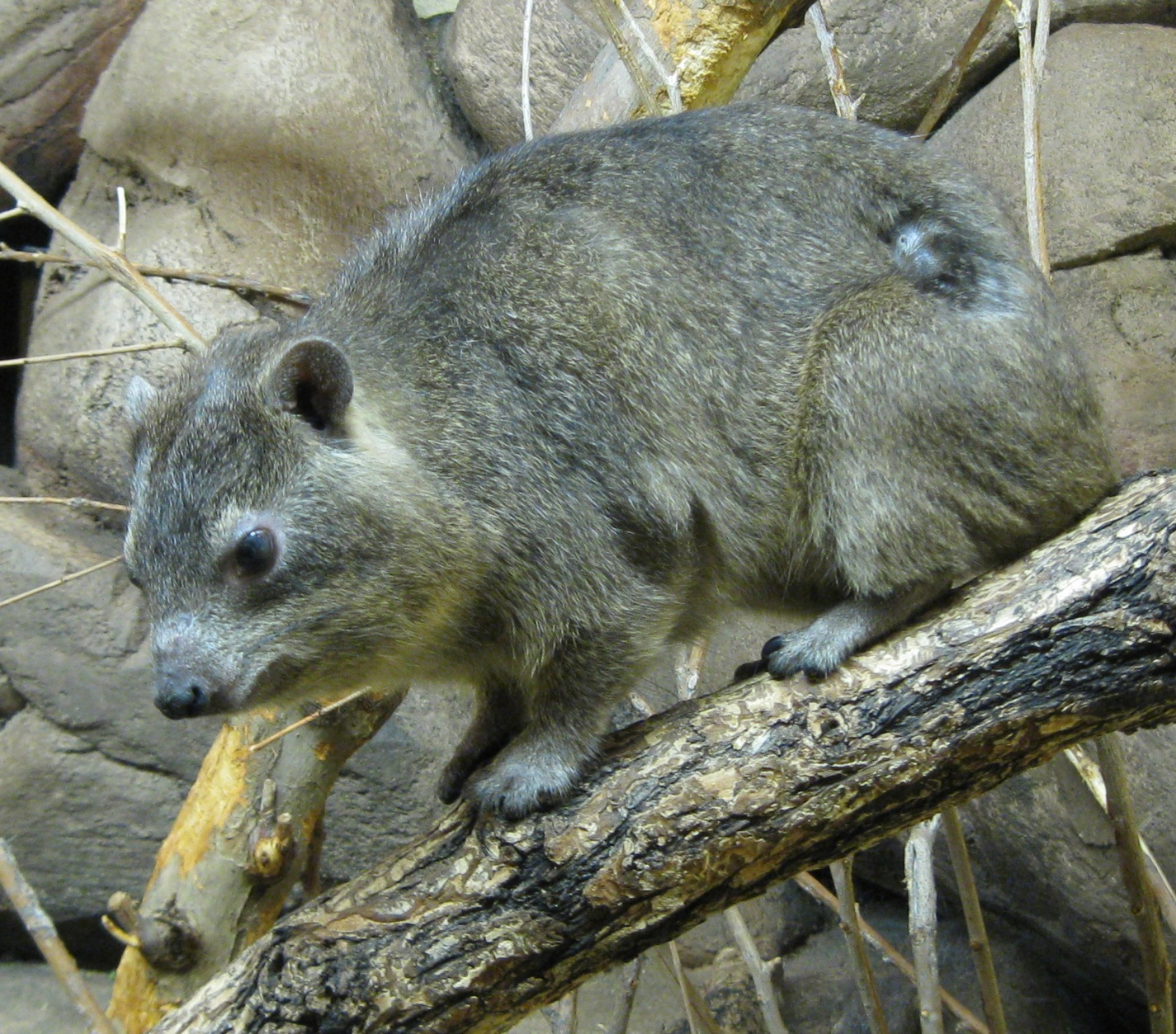
Hyrax.

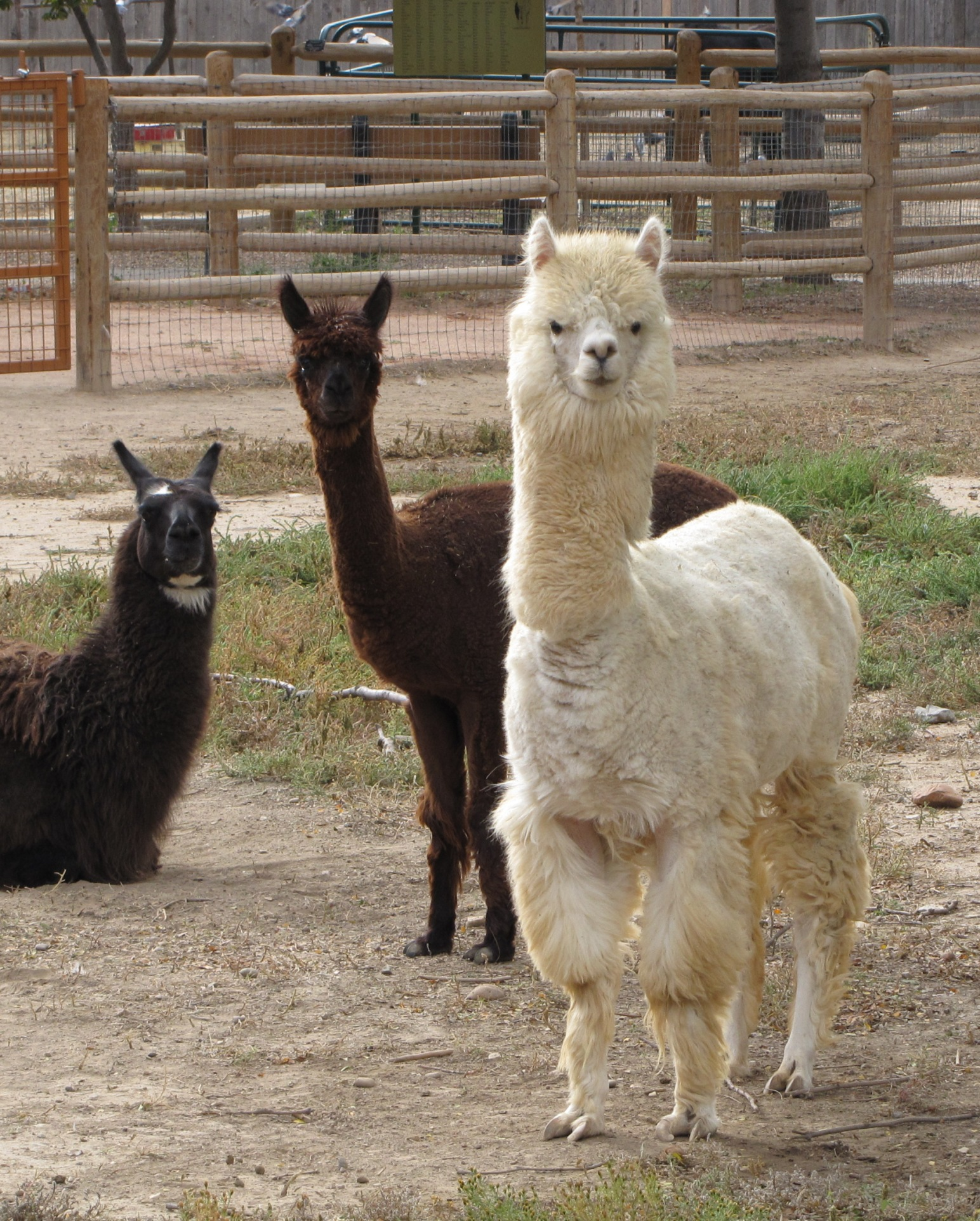
Llamas and alpaca.

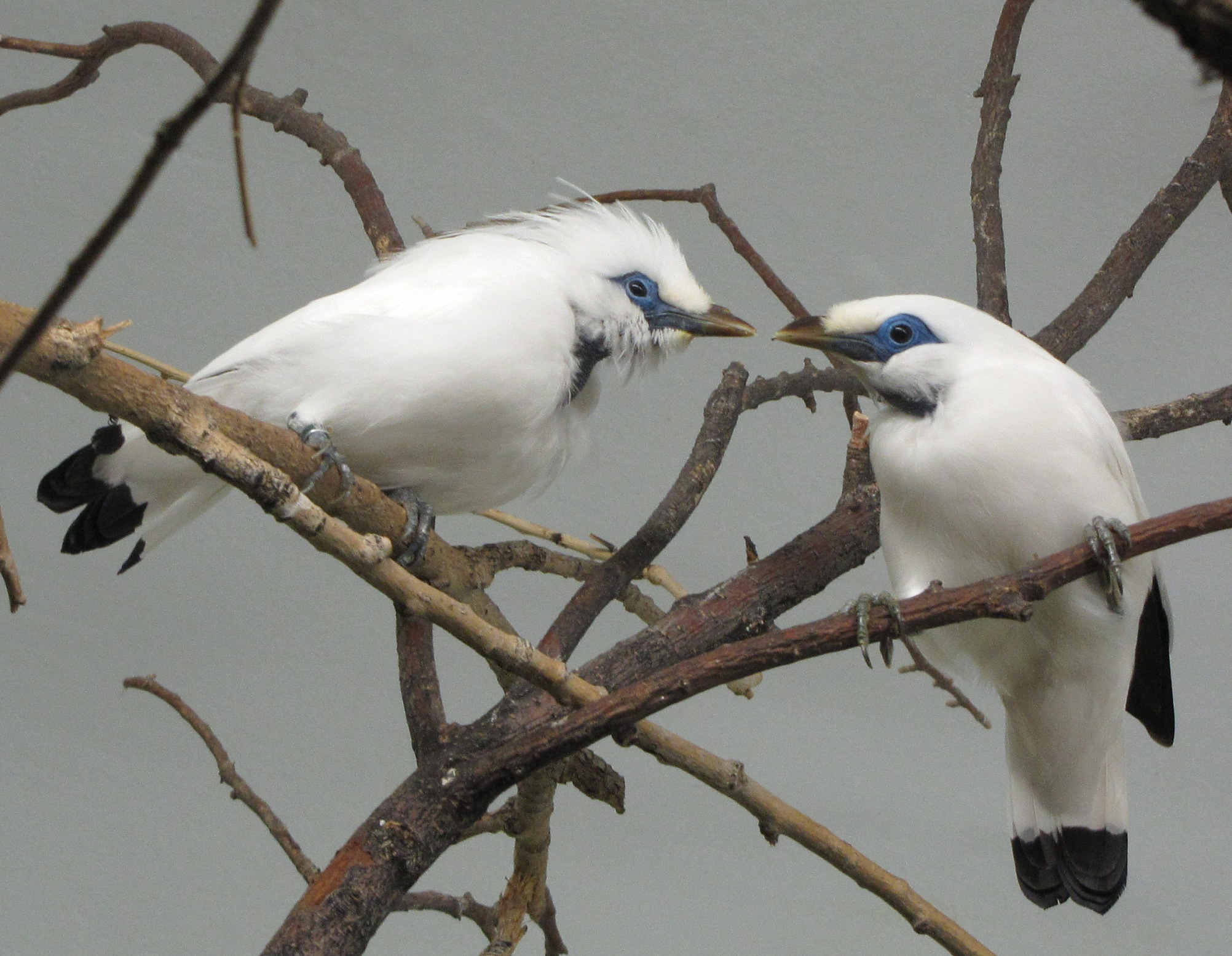
Bali mynas.

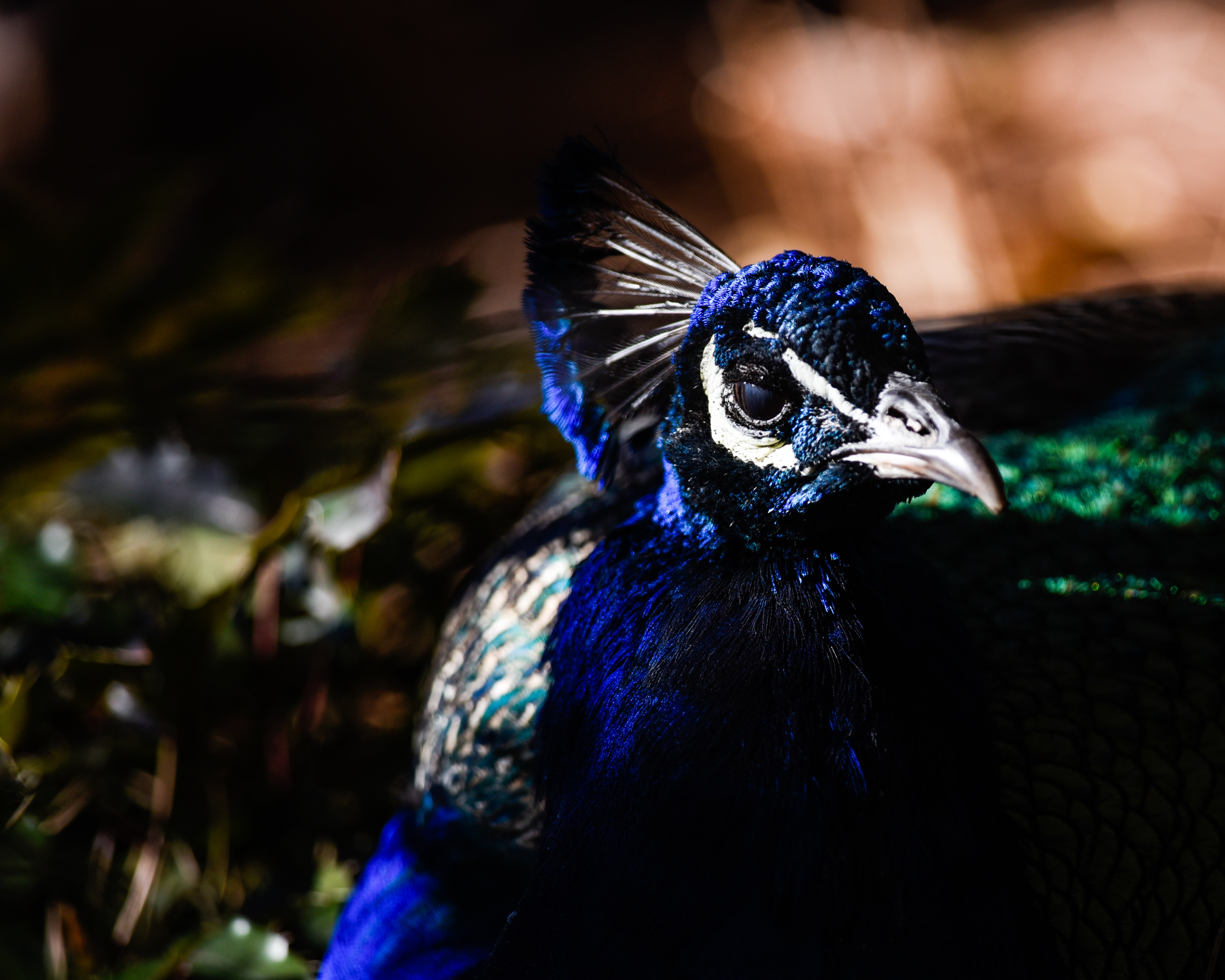
Peacock.
