= Montgomery Ward Building =

Montgomery Ward Building can refer to:

- Montgomery Ward Company Complex, the former administrative offices and distribution center for the Montgomery Ward mail order catalog and department store chain in Chicago, Illinois
- Montgomery Ward Building (Oakland, California), listed on the National Register of Historic Places
- Montgomery Ward Building (Pueblo, Colorado)
- Montgomery Ward Building (Idaho Falls, Idaho)
- Montgomery Ward Building (Evansville, Indiana)
- Montgomery Ward Building (Lewistown, Pennsylvania)
- Montgomery Ward Building (San Angelo, Texas)
- Montgomery Ward Building (Burlington, Vermont), listed on the National Register of Historic Places
- Montgomery Park (Portland, Oregon), formerly known as the Montgomery Ward & Company Building
- Montgomery Plaza, a current mixed-use development in Fort Worth, Texas, which served as a Montgomery Ward warehouse from 1928 to 2001
- Virginia Building in Columbia, Missouri, also known as Montgomery Ward Building

== See also ==
- Montgomery Ward Warehouse (disambiguation)
