= Montgomery Ward Warehouse =

Montgomery Ward Warehouse may refer to:

- Montgomery Ward Warehouse (1908), Chicago, Illinois, one of the buildings of the Montgomery Ward Company Complex
- Henkel-Duke Mercantile Company Warehouse (1895), Pueblo, Colorado, also known as "Montgomery Ward Warehouse"
- Montgomery Plaza, a current mixed-use development in Fort Worth, Texas, which served as a Montgomery Ward warehouse from 1928 to 2001

== See also ==
- Montgomery Ward Building (disambiguation)
