= The Montgomery =

The Montgomery may refer to one of the following buildings:

- The Montgomery (Chicago) in Illinois, United States
- The Montgomery (San Francisco) in California, United States

== See also ==
- Montgomery (disambiguation)
