= Spirit of Progress (disambiguation) =

The Spirit of Progress was the premier express passenger train on the Victorian Railways in Australia, running from Melbourne to the New South Wales border at Albury, and later through to Sydney.

Spirit of Progress may also refer to:

- Spirit of Progress (exhibition), a 1909 industrial exposition held in Cleveland, Ohio, United States
- The Spirit of Progress (statue), atop the Montgomery Ward building in Chicago, Illinois, United States
