= Symphony Center =

Concert hall in Chicago, Illinois

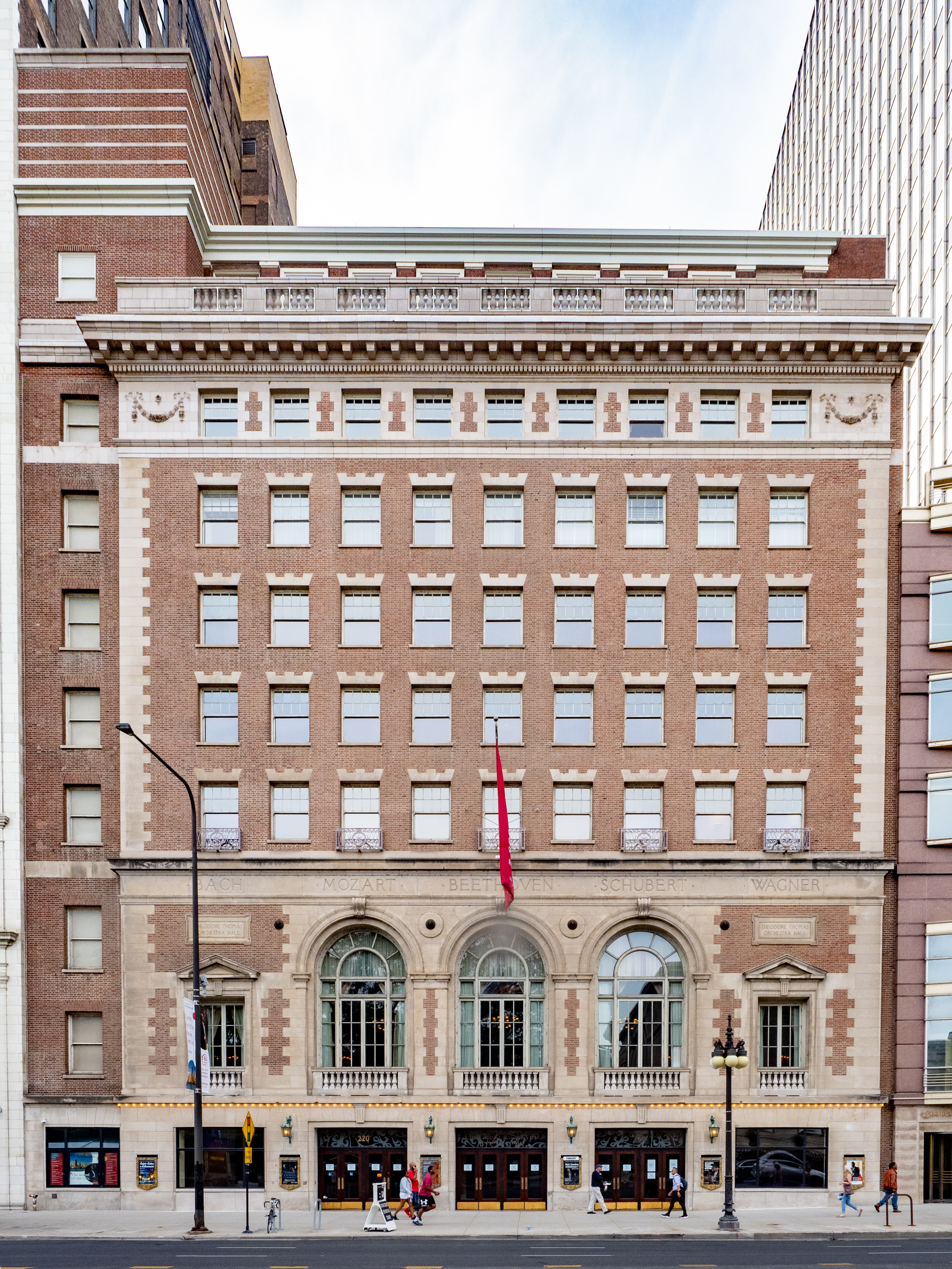
- Orchestra Hall (2021)
- Interactive map of Symphony Center
- Address: 220 S. Michigan Ave.
- Location: Chicago, Illinois
- Owner: Chicago Symphony Orchestra Association
- Capacity: Orchestra Hall: 2,522; Armour Stage: 150; Grainger Ballroom: 300; The Club at Symphony Center: 120; Buntrock Hall: 350
- Type: Concert hall
- Public transit: Adams/Wabash

Construction
- Built: 1904
- Opened: December 14, 1904

Website
- cso.org
- Symphony Center
- U.S. National Register of Historic Places
- U.S. National Historic Landmark
- Location within Chicago metropolitan area
- Coordinates: 41°52′45″N 87°37′30″W
- Architect: Daniel Burnham
- NRHP reference No.: 78001127

Significant dates
- Added to NRHP: March 21, 1978
- Designated NHL: April 19, 1994

Symphony Center is a music complex located at 220 South Michigan Avenue in the Loop area of Chicago, Illinois. Home to the Chicago Symphony Orchestra (CSO); Chicago Symphony Chorus; Civic Orchestra of Chicago; and the Institute for Learning, Access, and Training; Symphony Center includes the 2,522-seat Orchestra Hall, which dates from 1904; Buntrock Hall, a rehearsal and performance space named for the CSO trustee and benefactor Dean L. Buntrock; Grainger Ballroom, an event space overlooking Michigan Avenue and the Art Institute of Chicago; a public multi-story rotunda; Forte, a restaurant and café; and administrative offices. In June 1993, plans to significantly renovate and expand Orchestra Hall were approved and the $110 million project resulting in Symphony Center, completed in 1997.

Designed by architect Daniel Burnham, Orchestra Hall was designated a National Historic Landmark on April 19, 1994. It has been listed on the National Register of Historic Places since 1978.

== History ==
Built in 1904, Orchestra Hall was designed by renowned Chicago architect Daniel Burnham. The new hall was specifically designed as a home for the Chicago Symphony Orchestra, which had previously performed in the larger Auditorium Theater. Construction began on May 1, 1904, and the first concert was given on December 14, 1904. The building has "Theodore Thomas Orchestra Hall" inscribed in its façade, after the orchestra's first music director who died less than a month after his conducting debut there. The names Bach, Mozart, Beethoven, Schubert, and Wagner are inscribed above the ballroom windows on the façade.

From 1907 through 1996 the ninth-floor penthouse of the building served as the home of the Cliff Dwellers Club, with interior architecture by Howard Van Doren Shaw and the first significant mural of John Warner Norton.

The administrative offices are located within the historic Chapin and Gore Building, which was built in 1904. The building was designed by architectural partners Richard E. Schmidt and Hugh M. G. Garden. The building was attached to the Symphony Center campus as part of the 1997 renovation.

Orchestra Hall was also used as a movie theater during the 1910s, to maintain income during the summer months, when the Chicago Symphony Orchestra was playing at the Ravinia Festival. Lectures and other programs were held at Orchestra Hall in with speakers including Harry Houdini, Richard E. Byrd, Amelia Earhart, Bertrand Russell and Orson Welles.

In 2008 the venue hosted the 2008 Green National Convention alongside the Palmer House Hilton.

In 2012 the venue hosted the World Summit of Nobel Peace Laureates alongside the UIC Pavilion. This was held in Chicago simultaneous to the 2012 Chicago Summit.

== Acoustical history ==
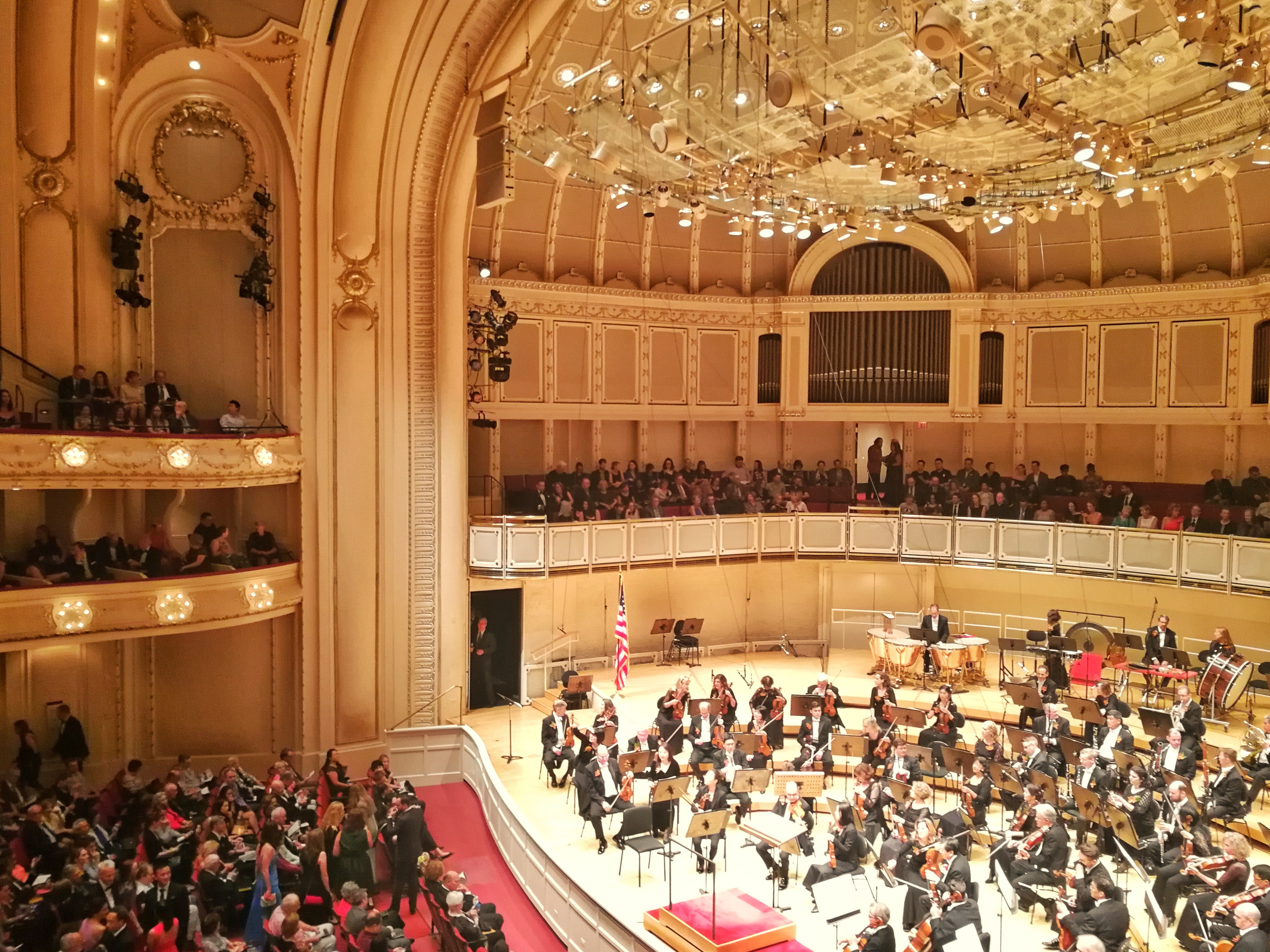
Orchestra Hall at the Symphony Center in Chicago awaiting Ricardo Muti on the opening evening of the 2017–18 season.

Sub-optimal acoustics within Orchestra Hall have been an ongoing concern throughout its history, and have been adjusted in major overhauls of the main hall in both the late 1960s and as part of the Symphony Center transformation between 1995 and 1997. In the late 1960s RCA records chose to make its CSO recordings at nearby Medinah Temple; as Leopold Stokowski reported at a 1968 session, "Medinah has a much better sound; I wish we could give concerts as well as record here."

Critical reaction is that the 1995–1997 acoustical revamp was largely successful, though with room for further improvement, particularly in the upper registers. Reviews at the time noted "[the hall] sounded altogether new, with a depth and spaciousness never before heard here. ... The low strings, especially, had a new warmth and solidity, and the whole bass and baritonal range of the orchestra provided a firmer basis and a mellower foil for the sound above it, which has always been brash and brilliant. ... Not that everything is perfect. High frequencies can still sound glassy, and the high strings have not yet benefited as much as their brethren. [Supervising acoustician R. Lawrence Kirkegaard] had already begun to work on the problem after a private concert on Tuesday evening and continues to do so.", "The orchestra now has a mellow bass sound that simply didn't exist before. Bass drums, previously the source of loud, dry thwacks, have a new resonance and texture. Violins have a richer color," and "It's fair to say that Orchestra Hall is, overall, vastly improved. The reverberation time, almost nonexistent before, is much lengthened. The strings, particularly in the lower ranges, are far more audible than was once the case, and all of the instruments resound with far more bloom, warmth, and brilliance. The sound is a good deal better in the other traditional trouble spot, the main floor beneath the balcony overhang, superb in the lower balcony and altogether glorious in the gallery."

In a review of a piano recital, not an orchestral concert, Chicago Tribune music critic John von Rhein wrote "...everything registered with the impact of the old hall, only better. There was more warmth, more space, around the keyboard. Similar reports came from listeners in the gallery.". However, the same critic also noted shortly after the renovation "As of now, the low end has been dramatically enhanced, perhaps too much so. The lower strings and lower brass are going to have to modify their sound output to the new sensitivities of the acoustics. In many ways, then, Orchestra Hall is a work in progress. The coming weeks and months will require adjustments from players and audience members alike. Lawrence Kirkegaard ... said he and his associates were 'intensively involved' in minor adjustments last week and will continue to tinker with the sound sporadically throughout the season," and some years after the transformation, critics at the Chicago Tribune newspaper expressed dissatisfaction with the Orchestra Hall acoustics.

== See also ==
- Chicago Symphony Orchestra
- List of concert halls
- Theodore Thomas
