= Chapin and Gore Building =

Historic building in Chicago, Illinois, US

- U.S. National Register of Historic Places
- Chicago Landmark
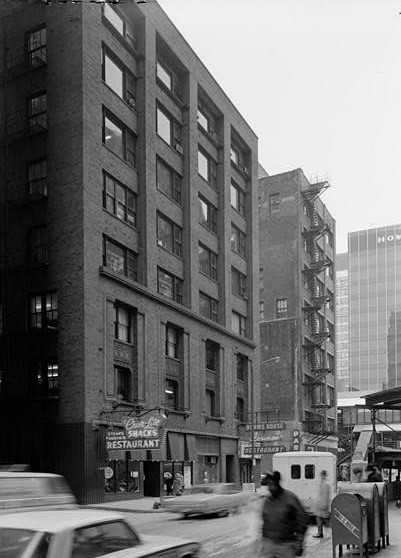

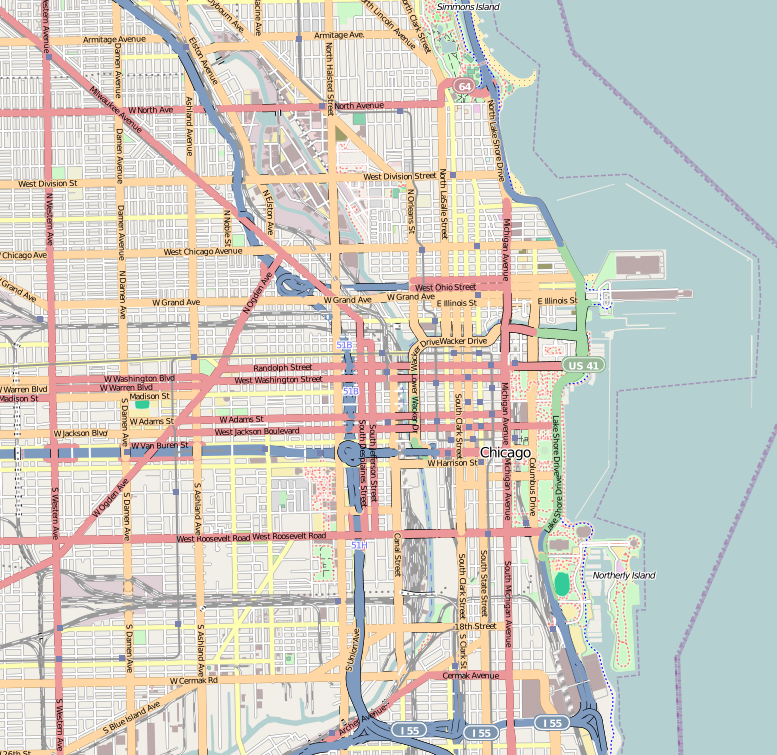
- Location within Central Chicago Location within Illinois Location within the United States
- Location: Chicago, Illinois
- Coordinates: 41°52′45.45″N 87°37′31.29″W
- Built: 1904
- Architect: Schmidt, Richard Ernest and Garden, Hugh M.G.
- Architectural style: Chicago
- NRHP reference No.: 79000823

Significant dates
- Added to NRHP: June 27, 1979
- Designated CHICL: January 21, 1982

The Chapin and Gore Building is a historic building located at 63 East Adams Street in downtown Chicago, Illinois. The distilling company of Chapin and Gore had the building constructed in 1904 for their business; the original building consisted a first-floor bar and store and offices and warehouse space in the remainder of the building. Architectural partners Richard E. Schmidt and Hugh M. G. Garden designed the building, which has a functional plan but includes substantial ornamentation such as terra cotta and brickwork. The building's ornamental capitals and cornice were removed in the 1950s. The building was listed on the National Register of Historic Places on June 27, 1979, and later designated as a Chicago Landmark on January 21, 1982.

The Chapin and Gore Building is currently the home of the Chicago Symphony Orchestra administration. It is part of the Symphony Center campus, attached in 1997 to Orchestra Hall. The Forte restaurant and café is on the ground floor.

== See also ==
- Chicago Landmark
