= Montgomery Ward Building (Evansville, Indiana) =

- U.S. National Register of Historic Places
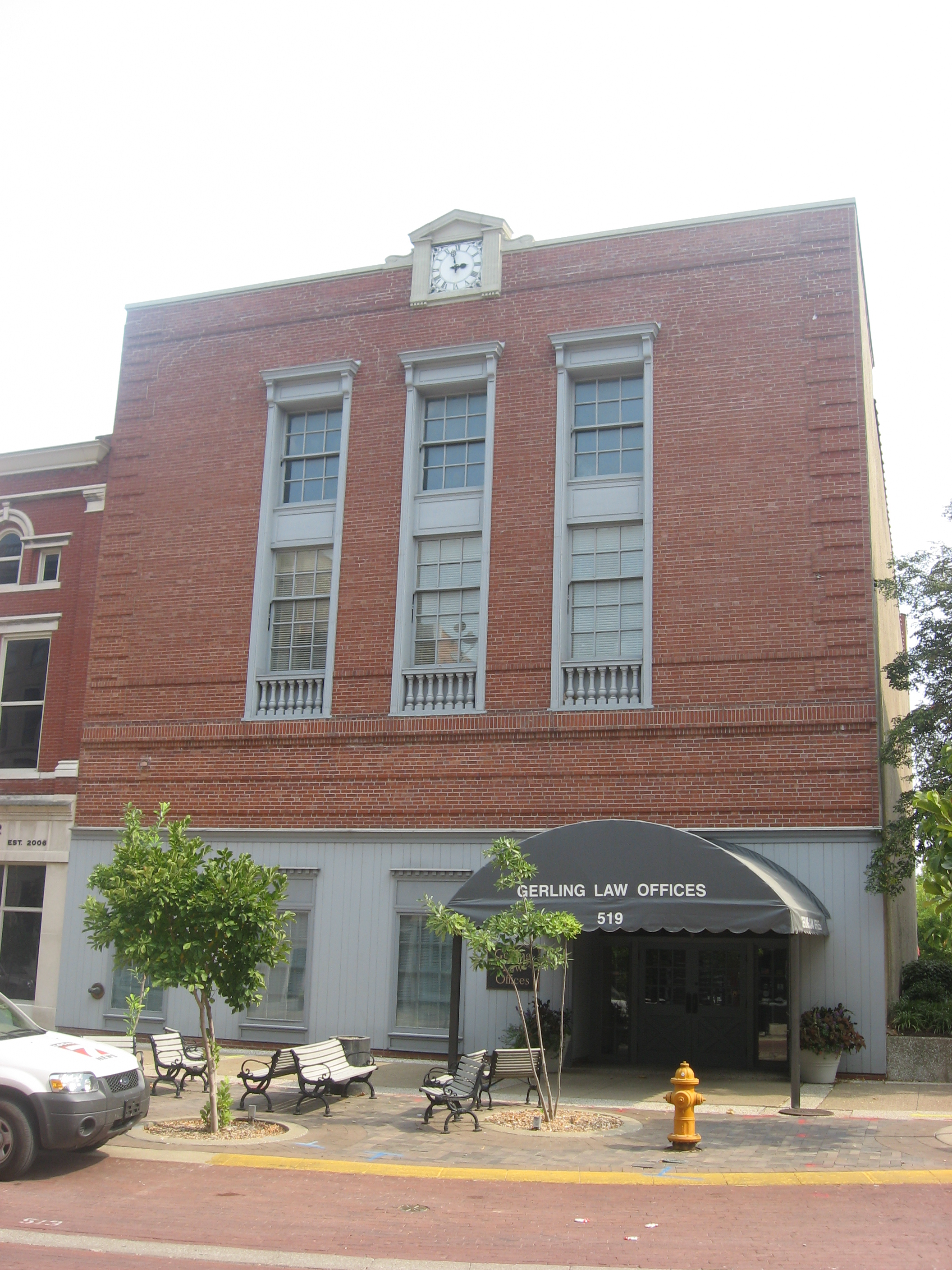
- Front of the building

- Location within Indiana Location within the United States
- Location: 517 Main St., Evansville, Indiana
- Coordinates: 37°58′20″N 87°34′9″W
- Area: less than one acre
- Built: 1933
- Architect: Montgomery Ward Company
- Architectural style: Colonial Revival
- MPS: Downtown Evansville MRA
- NRHP reference No.: 82000110
- Added to NRHP: October 06, 1982

The Montgomery Ward Building (also known as the Old Montgomery Ward Building) is a historic department store building at 517-19 Main Street in Downtown Evansville, Indiana. It has three stories and was completed in 1933 in the Georgian Revival style.

== See also ==
- Montgomery Ward
