= Theurer-Wrigley House =

Historic house in Illinois, United States

- U.S. National Register of Historic Places
- Chicago Landmark
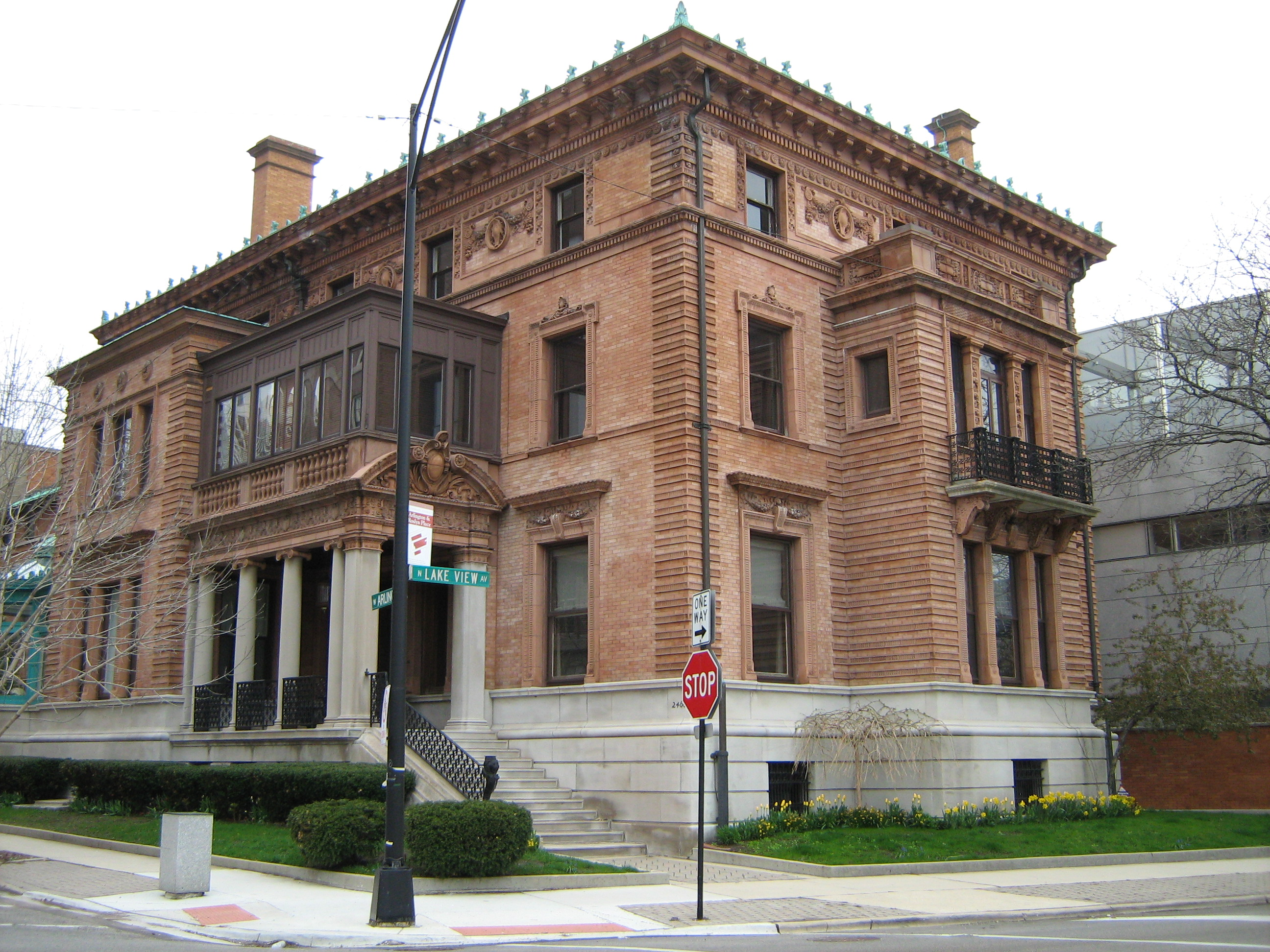

- Location within Chicago metropolitan area Location within Illinois Location within the United States
- Location: 2466 N. Lakeview Ave., Chicago, IL
- Coordinates: 41°55′39.3″N 87°38′21.18″W
- Built: 1897
- Architect: Richard E. Schmidt
- Architectural style: Renaissance
- NRHP reference No.: 80001352

Significant dates
- Added to NRHP: July 28, 1980
- Designated CHICL: August 10, 1979

Theurrer-Wrigley House, also known as the Wrigley Mansion, is a historic building located in the Lincoln Park area of Chicago, United States. The Italian Renaissance-style mansion was commissioned by Joseph Theurer, then-owner of the Schoenhofen Brewing Company, and purchased in 1911 by Chicago's Wrigley family. Listed in the National Register of Historic Places in 1980, the house was built in 1896 by Richard Schmidt and, possibly, Hugh M.G. Garden, two architects later prominent in the prairie school movement. A four-story home with three-story coach house, both built on a grand scale and in a late-Italian Renaissance style, the Theuer-Wrigley House is one of Chicago's most stunning homes.

The house itself covers over 15,000 square feet, including eight bedrooms, a conservatory and a ballroom. A three-story coach house has additional bedrooms. In 1984 the house had sat empty for several decades and a plan was made to make it the official residence of the mayor of Chicago, though the plan was never realized.

The home was designated a Chicago Landmark in 1979; a pedestal just outside the home features a Landmark plaque on it.

== Architecture ==
The main house comprises 11 bedrooms and more than 6 baths. It includes among other features: a marble entrance before magnificent mosaic work; grand cherry staircase; elevated ballroom with bandstand and walk-in cedar coatroom; wine-bar with cellars; a walk-in safe used during prohibition to store various alcohols; atrium; Baroque ornamentation on the ceilings and walls; rich hardwood floors; and a full driveway circling the main building providing access to the coach house. The house also stored several exceptional stained glass windows by Louis Tiffany. One of the windows is prominently on display in the Chicago History Museum. The house has been ornamented with various exotic woods ranging from mahogany and cherry to gorgeous bird's eye maple.

The exterior is of ornate baroque terra cotta almost unparalleled in Chicago; it is suspected of having been the early work of the Northwestern Terra Cotta Co., and may have helped launch the company to some acclaim as it grew to its national presence. The company was later responsible in 1920 for the terra cotta exterior of the Wrigley Building of Chicago, the ornamenture for which that building is justly famous. Having purchased the Wrigley-Theurer Mansion in 1911 and commissioned the Wrigley Building in 1920, the influence of the beauty of the former on William Wrigley Jr.'s commission of the latter stands as an interesting footnote to history.

== In recent years ==
External videos
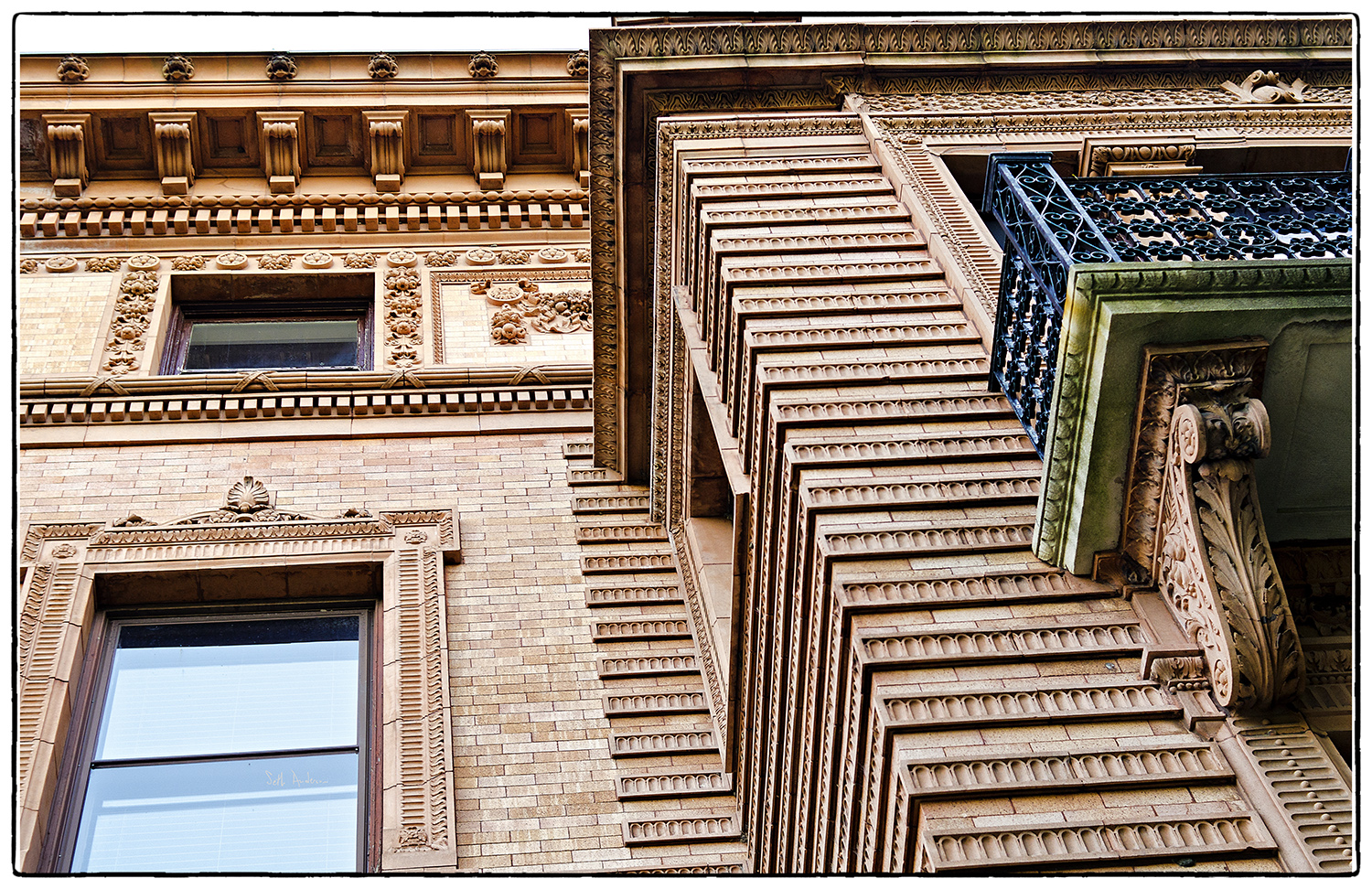
- Chicago's Wrigley Mansion, living in an iconic landmark, YoChicago.com on YouTube (16:43)

The Wrigley Family left the residence vacant in the years during and after the Great Depression, a period during which such mansions became targets for kidnapping and robbery, as in the cases of the Lindbergh child, George Weyerhauser, William Hamm, and numerous others. Originally furnished with nearly all Tiffany light fixtures, many of these were sold off at estate sales throughout the 1980s and early 1990s, or moved by the owners to other residences. The house was bought at some time in the late 1980s or early 1990s by Nick Jannes who started its renovation. He renamed it The Jannes Mansion. The downstairs was totally renovated and he rented it out for lavish events. The house remained vacant or under relatively poor custodianship for many years and, though still in excellent condition, requires both care and repair. The house sold for $11,000,000 in 2004 and received attention from Forbes's and Christie's online sites. In early 2017, the home came onto the market via a foreclosure. The home sold in January 2018 for $4.65 million.
