= Montgomery Ward Building (Pueblo, Colorado) =

- U.S. National Register of Historic Places
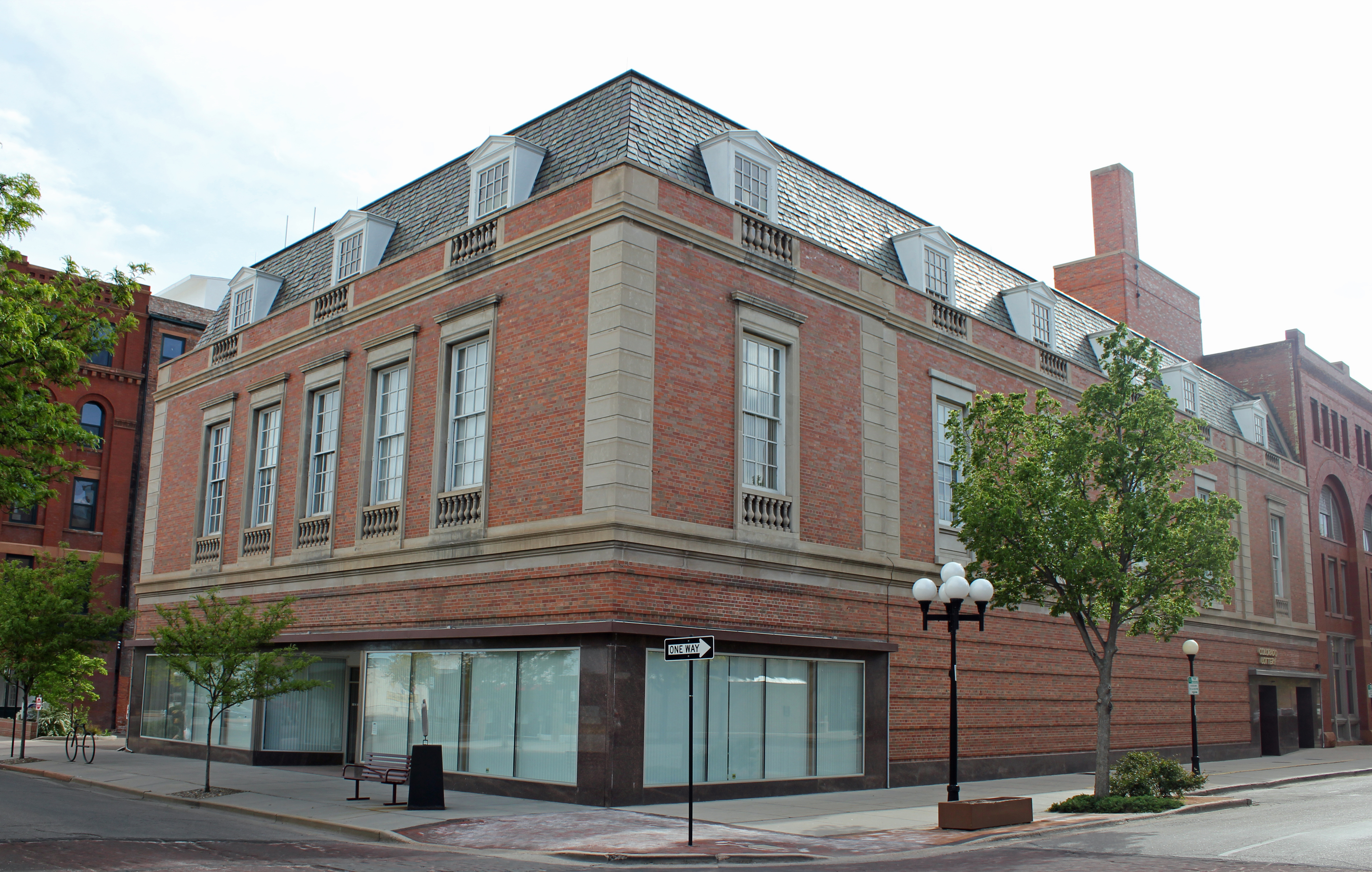

- Location within Colorado Location within the United States
- Location: 225 N. Main St., Pueblo, Colorado
- Coordinates: 38°16′10″N 104°36′30″W
- Area: less than one acre
- Built: 1936
- Architect: Robert R. Rowe
- Architectural style: Georgian Revival
- NRHP reference No.: 85003697
- Added to NRHP: December 24, 1996

The Montgomery Ward Building is a historic department store building in downtown Pueblo, Colorado. It was listed on the National Register of Historic Places in 1996. Currently used as an office building, it houses the American Bank of Commerce, the Colorado Lottery, and the Pueblo Work Force Center. Previously it was occupied by QualMed as its headquarters.

It was built in 1936. It is a two-story 72 by 127 feet (22 m × 39 m) building. The building was deemed notable "as an intact example of the Montgomery Ward Company's standard Georgian Revival corporate style used for its department stores from 1933 to 1948"; it is the only example of the Montgomery Ward Georgian Revival style in the state.

== See also ==
- Henkel-Duke Mercantile Company Warehouse, also known as "Montgomery Ward Warehouse", also in Pueblo and NRHP-listed
- Montgomery Ward
