= Montgomery Ward Building (Idaho Falls, Idaho) =

- U.S. National Register of Historic Places
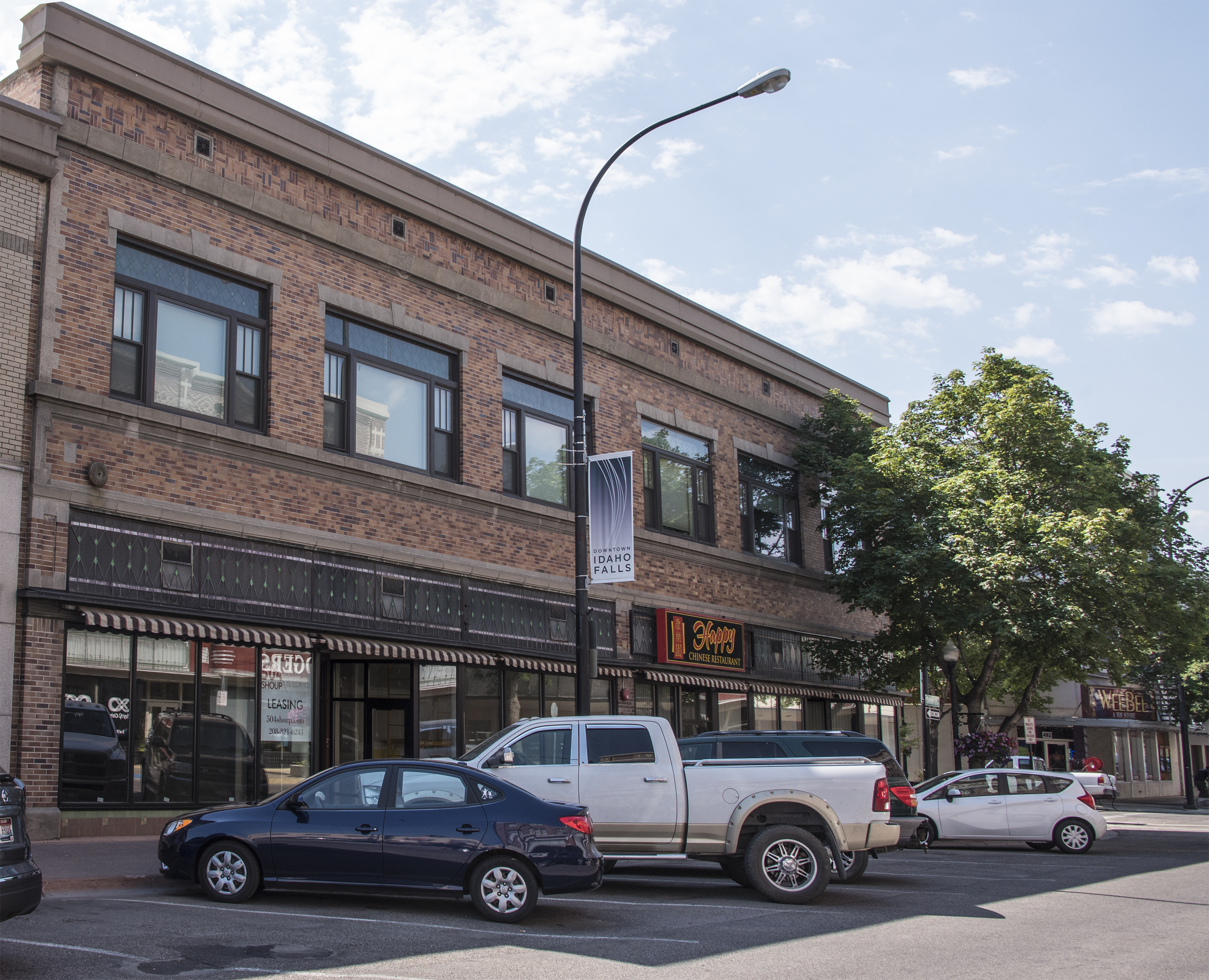

- Location within Idaho Location within the United States
- Location: 504 Shoup Ave. Idaho Falls, Idaho
- Coordinates: 43°29′36″N 112°02′19″W
- Built: 1928-1929
- Architectural style: Renaissance
- NRHP reference No.: 84001096
- Added to NRHP: 1984-08-30

The Montgomery Ward Building or Montgomery Ward and Company Department Store is a historic department store building in downtown Idaho Falls, Idaho, USA. It currently houses Happy Chinese Restaurant and a number of vacant and occupied offices in the second floor.

== See also ==
- Montgomery Ward
