= Henkel-Duke Mercantile Company Warehouse =

- U.S. National Register of Historic Places
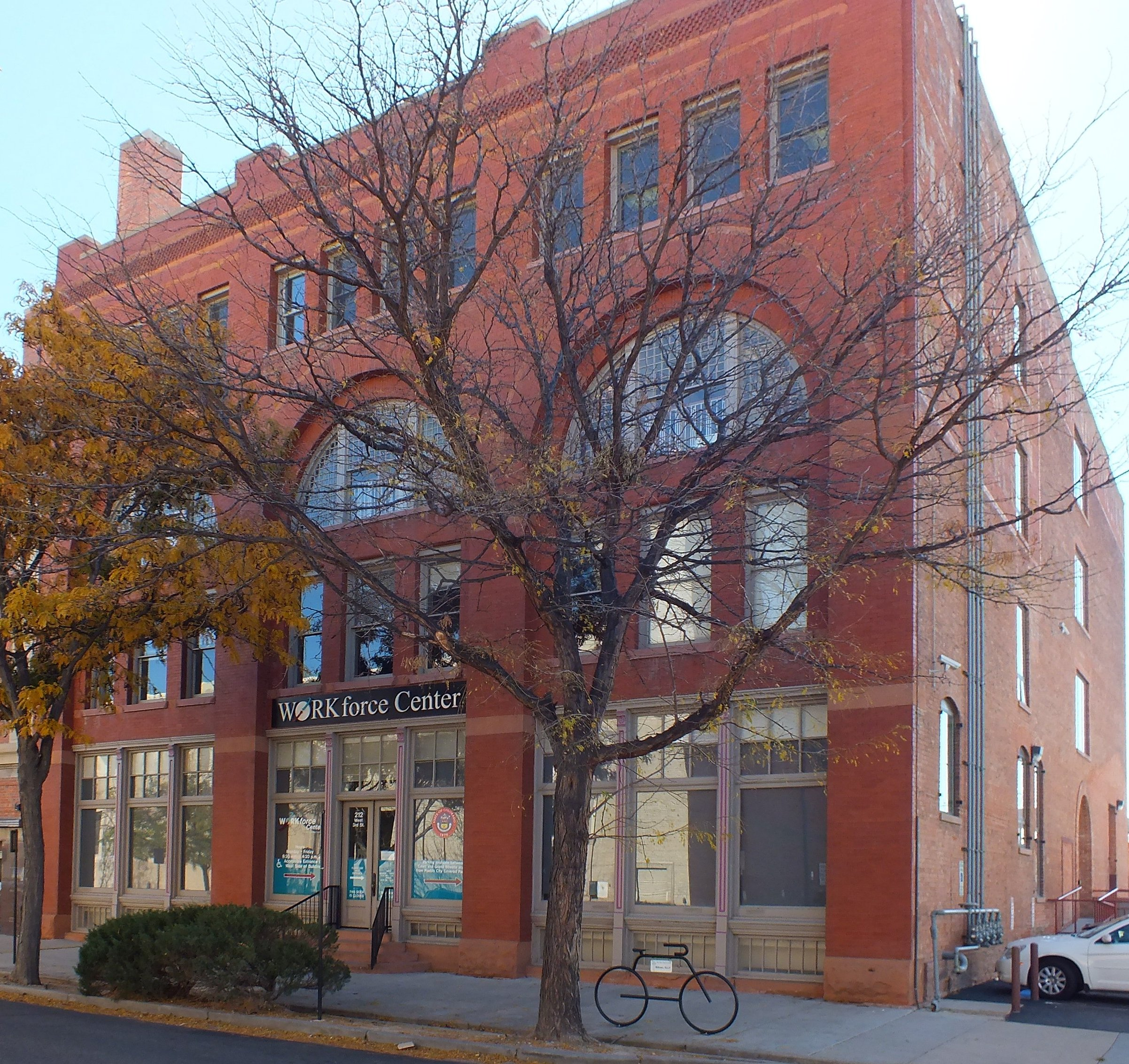

- Location within Colorado Location within the United States
- Location: 212-222 W. 3rd Ave., Pueblo, Colorado
- Coordinates: 38°16′10″N 104°36′31″W
- Area: 0.4 acres (0.16 ha)
- Built: 1895
- Architectural style: Colonial Revival, Neo-Colonial Revival
- NRHP reference No.: 84000881
- Added to NRHP: May 17, 1984

The Henkel-Duke Mercantile Company Warehouse, also known as Charles Henkel & Co. Building or Montgomery Ward Warehouse, is a historic warehouse in downtown Pueblo, Colorado. The building once served as a wholesale grocery warehouse.

== See also ==
- Montgomery Ward Building (Pueblo, Colorado), also NRHP-listed
