= The Montgomery (Chicago) =

Condominium building in Chicago, Illinois

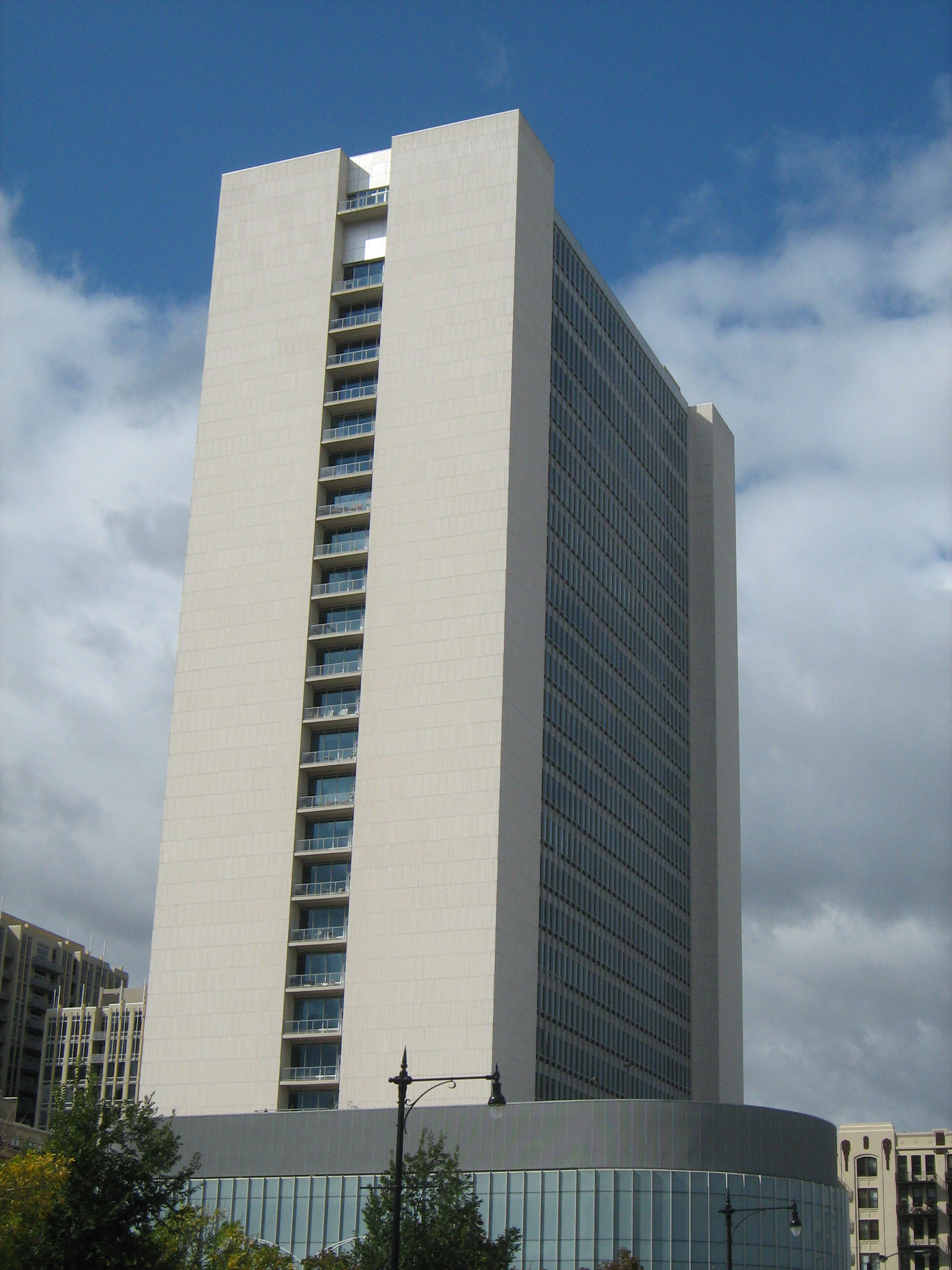
- Former names: Montgomery Ward Headquarters

General information
- Status: Completed
- Type: Residential
- Architectural style: Modern
- Location: 500 West Superior Street, Chicago, Illinois, USA
- Coordinates: 41.89587°N 87.64231°W
- Completed: 1972
- Renovated: 2005–2006

Height
- Height: 403.67 ft (123.04 m)

Technical details
- Structural system: Curtain wall
- Floor count: 28
- Lifts/elevators: 6 plus one wheelchair lift

Design and construction
- Architect: Minoru Yamasaki

Website
- themontgomery.net (condo association)

References
- The Montgomery, Emporis

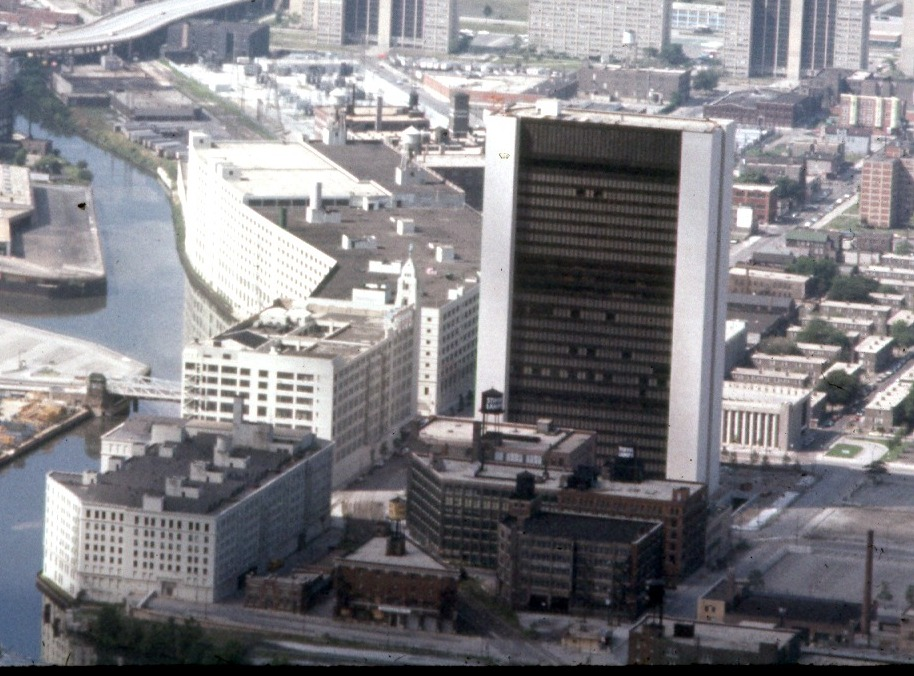
View of the building and its surroundings in 1974

The Montgomery is a 404-foot (123 m) tall, 26-story skyscraper in Near North Side, Chicago, Illinois. It was built in 1972 as part of the Montgomery Ward Company Complex to serve as a corporate headquarters. The architect was Minoru Yamasaki who also designed the World Trade Center at the same time. In 2005–2006, it was converted to residential use.
