= Richard E. Schmidt =

German-born American architect

Richard Ernest Schmidt
- Born: 1865; Kingdom of Bavaria
- Died: 1958 (aged 92–93)
- Occupation: Architect
- Practice: Richard E. Schmidt, Garden and Martin; Schmidt, Garden and Martin; Schmidt, Garden, and Erikson
- Buildings: Chapin and Gore Building, Schoenhofen Brewery Powerhouse, Michael Reese Hospital, Montgomery Ward Catalog Warehouse

Richard Ernest Schmidt (14.11.1865–17.10.1958) was an American architect, a member of the so-called first Chicago School and a near-contemporary of Frank Lloyd Wright and Louis Sullivan.

== Life ==
Schmidt was born in Ebern, Kingdom of Bavaria and brought to America by his parents at the age of one. In 1883, he enrolled in the architecture school at MIT. However, he left to begin practicing before completing the program. he worked for architects such as Adolph Cudell and Charles Sumner Frost before eventually settling in Chicago in 1887.

Eight years later, he asked Hugh Mackie Gorden Garden to join him as chief designer, who was also an extremely skilled structural engineer. A native of Canada, Garden had moved to Chicago in the late-1880s, apprenticing with several architectural firms, including Flanders & Zimmerman, Henry Ives Cobb, and Shepley, Rutan & Coolidge. Additionally, he became a freelance renderer, which brought him jobs with Howard Van Doren Shaw, Louis Sullivan, and Frank Lloyd Wright. Although known primarily for their commercial and industrial designs, the firm also designed more than 300 hospitals as well as many other public structures. All in a progressive style, similar to Sullivan and Wright.

== Selected commissions ==
- Security Benefit Association Hospital, Topeka
- Theurer-Wrigley House, Chicago
- Albert F. Madlener House, Chicago
- Montgomery Ward Company Complex, Chicago
- Humboldt Park Boathouse Pavilion, Chicago
- Cook County Hospital Administration Building, Chicago
- Michael Reese Hospital, Chicago
- Institute of Thermal Research, Buffalo
