= Montgomery Ward =

Retailer in the United States

Montgomery Ward Inc.

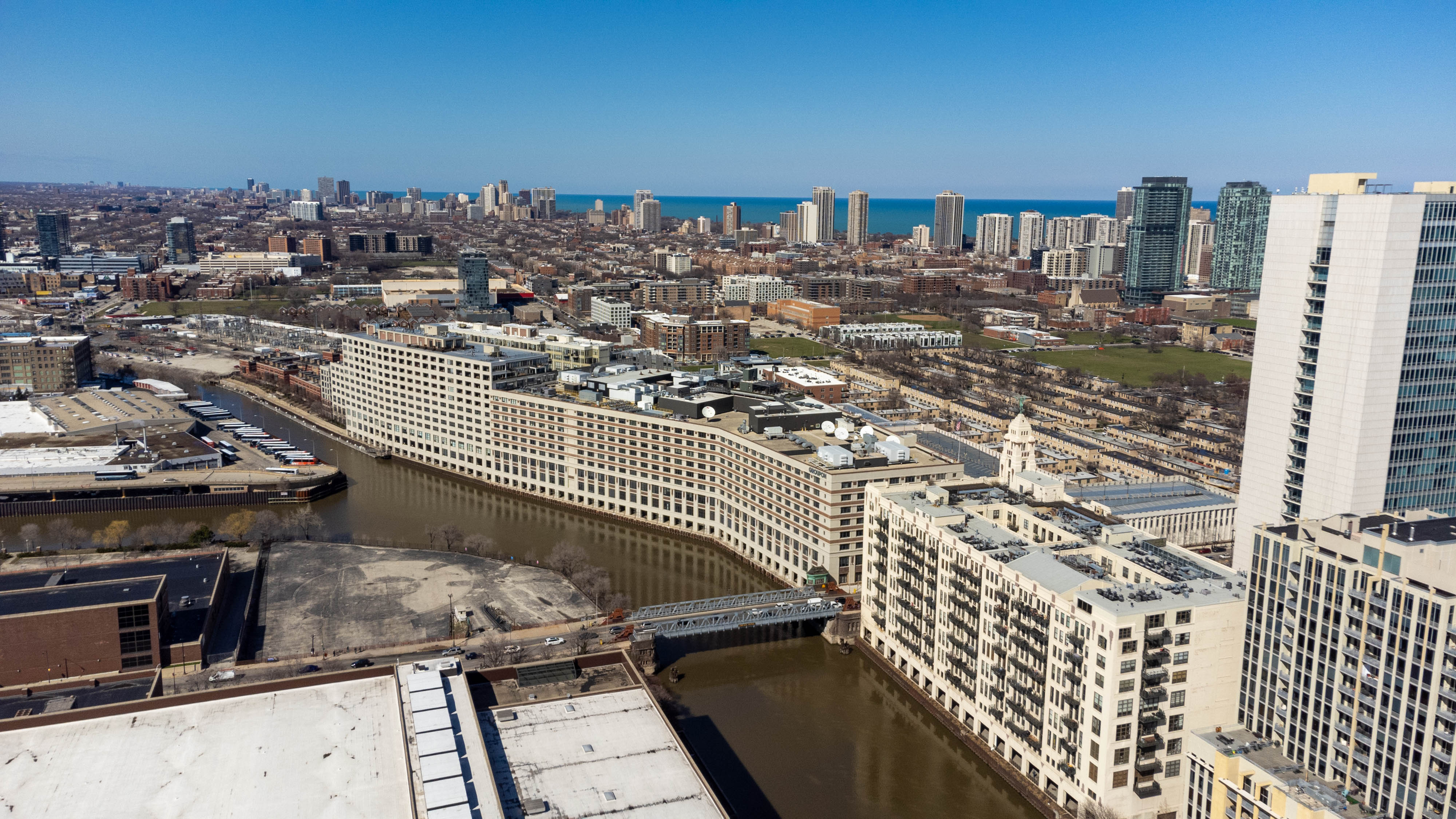
- Montgomery Ward Company Complex, former headquarters in Chicago
- Type: Original incarnation: Private; mail order and department store; Current incarnation: Online retailer and catalog merchant
- Industry: Retail
- Founded: 1872 (154 years ago): As mail order company and later department store; 2004 (22 years ago): As online retailer
- Defunct: June 2001; 25 years ago (original company)
- Fate: Bankruptcy in 2000; full liquidation in 2001; namesake retailer launched in 2004 after purchase of trademarks
- Headquarters: Original company: Chicago, Illinois, United States; Namesake company: Monroe, Wisconsin, United States
- Key people: Original company: 1872 founder, Aaron Montgomery Ward; Namesake company: John Baumann, president of parent company Colony Brands
- Products: Clothing, footwear, bedding, furniture, jewelry, beauty products, appliances, housewares, tools, and electronics
- Brands: Riverside; Airline; Powr-Kraft
- Parent: Original company: Mobil (1974–1988) GE Capital (1988–2001); Namesake company: Colony Brands
- Divisions: Electric Avenue; Wards Kids; Montgomery Ward Catalog; Montgomery Wards Auto Express
- Website: www.wards.com

Montgomery Ward is the name of two U.S. retail corporations, one of which is defunct. The original Montgomery Ward & Co. was a mail-order business and later a department store chain that operated between 1872 and 2001. The current Montgomery Ward Inc. is an online shopping and mail-order catalog retailer that started three years after the original Montgomery Ward went out of business.

== Original Montgomery Ward (1872–2001) ==
=== Company origins ===
Aaron Montgomery Ward started his business in Chicago; conflicting reports place his first office either in a single room at 825 North Clark Street or in a loft above a livery stable on Kinzie Street, between Rush and State Streets.

In 1883, the company's catalog had grown to 240 pages and 10,000 items. In 1896, Ward encountered its first serious competition in the mail order business, when Richard Warren Sears introduced his first general catalog. In 1900, Ward had total sales of $8.7 million, compared to $10 million for Sears, and both companies vied for dominance during much of the 20th century. By 1904, Ward had expanded such that it mailed three million catalogs, weighing 4 lb (1.8 kg) each, to customers.

In 1908, the company opened a 1.25-million-square-foot (116,000 m^{2}) building stretching along nearly one-quarter mile of the Chicago River, north of downtown Chicago. The building, known as the Montgomery Ward & Co. Catalog House, served as the company headquarters until 1974, when the offices moved across the street to a new tower designed by Minoru Yamasaki. The catalog house was declared a National Historic Landmark in 1978 and a Chicago historic landmark in May 2000.

In the decades before 1930, Montgomery Ward built a network of large distribution centers across the country in Baltimore, Fort Worth, Kansas City, Oakland, Portland, and St. Paul. In most cases, these reinforced concrete structures were the largest industrial structures in their respective locations. The Baltimore Montgomery Ward Warehouse and Retail Store was added to the National Register of Historic Places in 2000.

=== Expansion into retail outlets ===
In 1926, the company broke with its mail-order-only tradition when it opened its first retail outlet store in Plymouth, Indiana. It continued to operate its catalog business while pursuing an aggressive campaign to build retail outlets in the late 1920s. In 1928, two years after opening its first outlet, it had opened 244 stores. By 1929, it had more than doubled its number of outlets to 531. Its flagship retail store in Chicago was located on Michigan Avenue between Madison and Washington streets.

In 1930, the company declined a merger offer from rival chain Sears. Losing money during the Great Depression, Ward alarmed its major investors, including J. P. Morgan, Jr. In 1931, Morgan hired a new president, Sewell Avery, who cut staff levels and stores, changed lines, hired store rather than catalog managers, and refurbished stores. These actions allowed the company to become profitable before the end of the 1930s.

Ward was very successful in its retail business. "Green awning" stores dotted hundreds of small towns across the country. Larger stores were built in the major cities. By the end of the 1930s, Montgomery Ward had become the country's largest retailer, and Sewell Avery became the company's chief executive officer.

=== Government seizure ===
In April 1944, four months into a nationwide strike by the company's 12,000 workers, U.S. Army troops seized the company's Chicago offices. The action was ordered due to Avery's refusal to settle the strike as requested by the Franklin D. Roosevelt administration, concerned about the adverse effect on the delivery of goods in wartime.

Avery had refused to comply with a War Labor Board order to recognize the unions and institute the terms of a collective bargaining agreement. Eight months later, with Montgomery Ward continuing to refuse to recognize the unions, President Roosevelt issued an executive order seizing all of Montgomery Ward's property nationwide, citing the War Labor Disputes Act as well as his power under the Constitution as commander-in-chief. In 1945, President Harry S. Truman ended the seizure and the Supreme Court dismissed the pending appeal as moot.

=== Post War ===
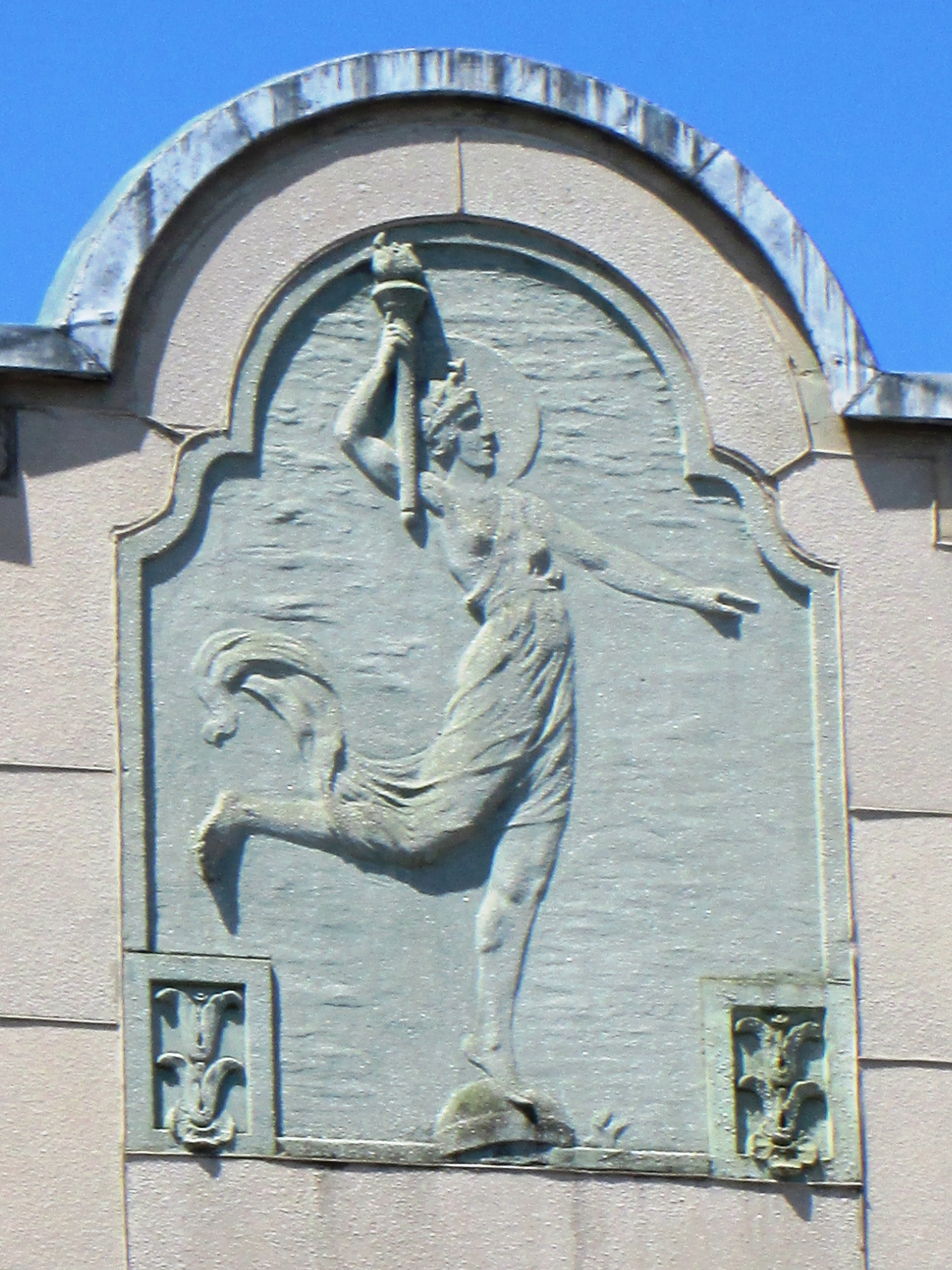
Progress Lighting the Way for Commerce, designed for Montgomery Ward by sculptor J. Massey Rhind, appeared as a medallion at many Ward stores. This one is in Brattleboro, Vermont.

Montgomery Ward logo, used from May 1968 to July 1982

The 1995–1997 Montgomery Ward logo

After World War II, Sewell Avery believed the country would fall back into a recession or even a depression. He decided to not open any new stores, and did not even permit expenditure for paint to freshen the existing stores. His plan was to bank profits to preserve liquidity when the recession or depression he anticipated hit, and then buy up his retail competition.

Without new stores or any investment back into the business, Montgomery Ward declined in sales volume compared to Sears. Many have blamed the conservative decisions of Avery, who seemed not to understand the postwar years' changing economy. As new shopping centers were built after the war, Sears was perceived to have better locations than Ward. Nonetheless, for many years Ward was still the nation's third-largest department store chain.

In 1955, investor Louis Wolfson waged a high-profile proxy fight to obtain control of the board of Montgomery Ward. The new board forced the resignation of Avery. This fight led to a state court decision that Illinois corporations were not entitled to stagger elections of board members.

In 1961, company president John Barr hired Robert Elton Brooker to lead Montgomery Ward as president in its turnaround. Brooker brought with him a number of key new management people, including Edward Donnell, former manager of Sears' Los Angeles stores.

The new management team achieved the turnaround, reducing the number of suppliers from 15,000 to 7,000 and the number of brands being carried dropped from 168 to 16. Ward's private brands were given 95 percent of the volume compared with 40 percent in 1960.

The results of these changes were lower handling costs and higher quality standards. Buying was centralized but store operations were decentralized, under a new territory system modeled after Sears.

In 1966, Ed Donnell was named company president. Brooker continued as chairman and chief executive officer until 1976. In 1968, Brooker helped engineer a friendly merger with Container Corporation of America, the new parent company being named MARCOR.

Despite the merger, the company continued to struggle into the 1970s. In 1973, its 102nd year in business, it purchased a small discount store chain, the Miami-based Jefferson Stores, renaming these locations Jefferson Ward. Mobil, flush with cash from the recent rise in oil prices and looking to diversify, bought a controlling share of MARCOR in 1974, only to acquire the company outright in 1976.

The company was an early entrant in the home computer market with the CyberVision 2001 in 1978, developed by the Authorship Resource, Inc., of Franklin, Ohio, and primarily manufactured by United Chem-Con. However, mounting competition from other computer companies as well as manufacturing problems compelled the three companies to pull the plug on the CyberVision product by the early 1980s.

By 1980, Mobil realized that the Montgomery Ward stores were doing poorly in comparison to the Jefferson stores, and decided that high quality discount units, along the lines of Dayton Hudson Company's Target stores, would be the retailer's future.

Within 18 months, management quintupled the size of the operation, now called Jefferson Ward, to more than 40 units in the Philadelphia metropolitan area and Richmond metropolitan area, and planned to convert one-third of Montgomery Ward's existing stores to the Jefferson Ward model.

The burden of servicing the new stores fell to the tiny Jefferson staff, who were overwhelmed by the increased store count, had no experience in dealing with some of the product lines they now carried, and were unfamiliar with buying for northern markets.

Almost immediately, Jefferson had turned from a small moneymaker into a large drain on profits. The company sold the chain's 18-store northern division to Bradlees, a division of Stop & Shop, in 1985. The remaining stores closed.

In 1985, the company closed its catalog business after 113 years and began an aggressive policy of renovating its remaining stores. It restructured many of the store layouts in the downtown areas of larger cities and affluent neighborhoods into boutique-like specialty stores, as these were drawing business from traditional department stores. In 1986, fellow MARCOR firm, Container Corporation of America, was divested by Mobil. This effectively dissolved the MARCOR division and left Montgomery Ward as a direct subsidiary of Mobil. Analysts saw the CCA sale as an effort to go back on their diversification efforts, as the debts incurred since MARCOR's acquisition began to weigh the oil giant down, and many predicted Montgomery Ward was next to be sold. These theories were confirmed in January 1987, when Mobil stated they would be looking into spinning off the company in the near future.

In March 1988, the company management undertook a successful $3.8 billion (~$8.91 billion in 2025) leveraged buyout, making Montgomery Ward a privately held company.

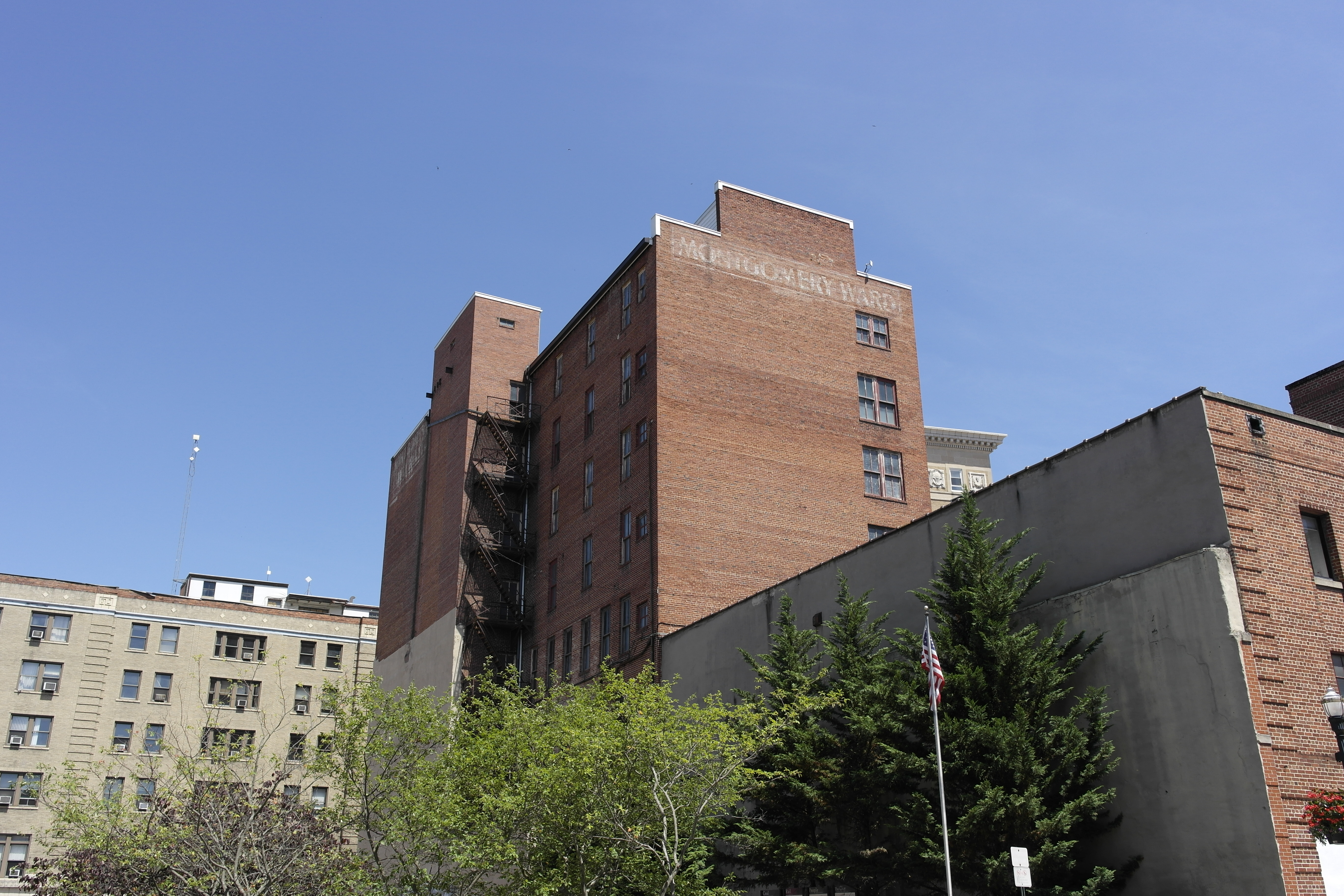
A Montgomery Ward Building in Bluefield, West Virginia, demolished in 2024

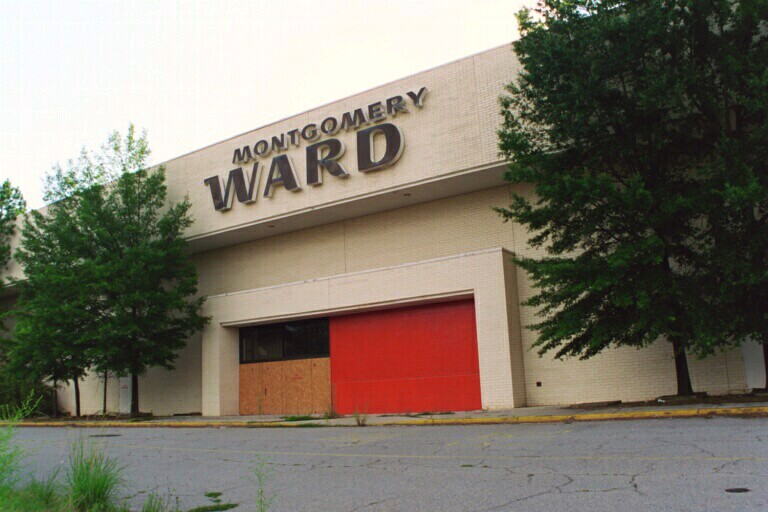
A vacant Montgomery Ward store, Regency Mall, Augusta, Georgia, demolished in 2020

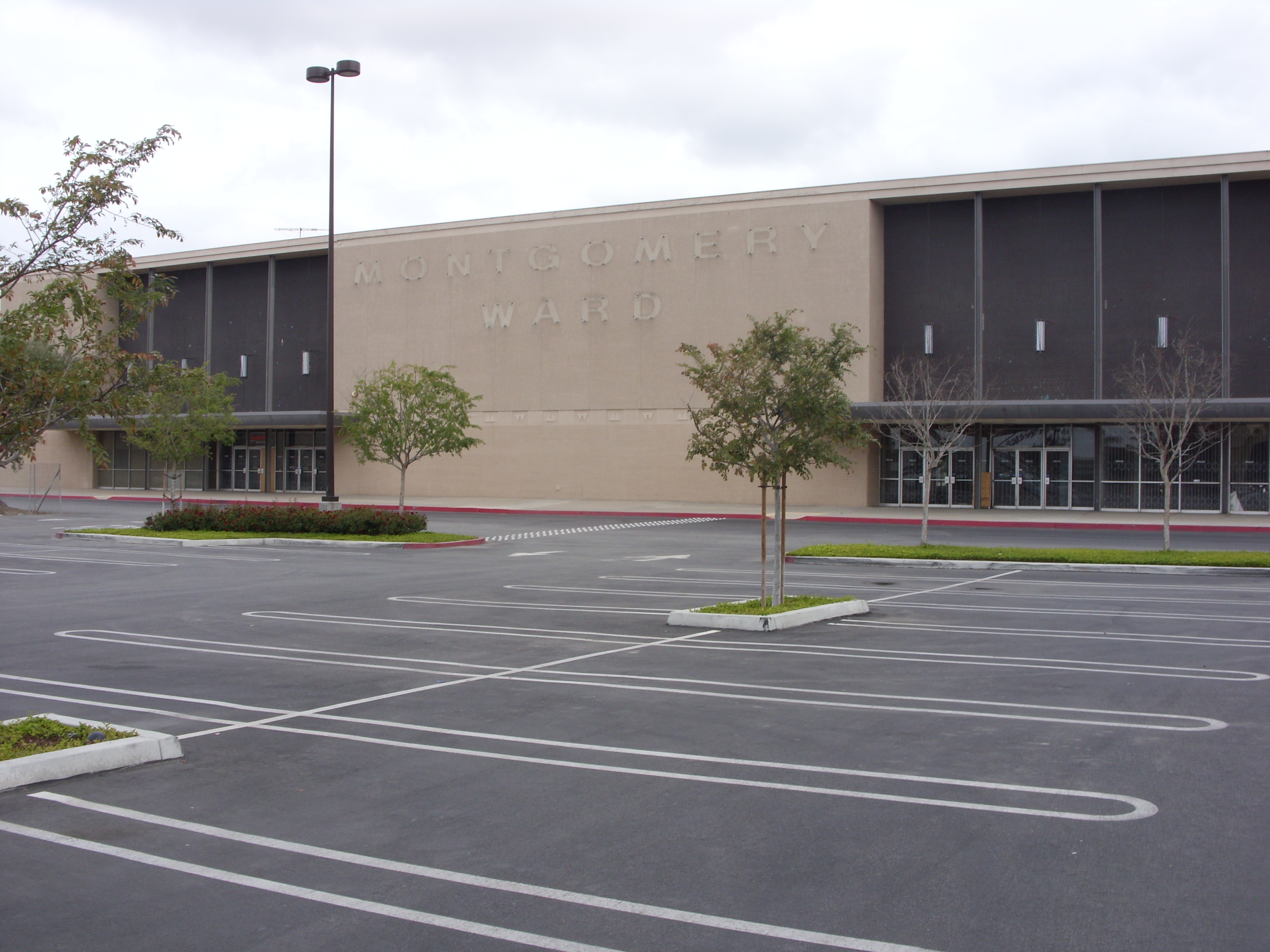
A former Montgomery Ward store, Huntington Center, Huntington Beach, California, demolished in 2010

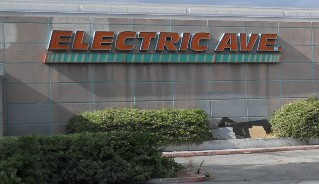
An "Electric Avenue" logo on a closed store in Panorama City, California in 2010, demolished in 2024

=== Bankruptcy, restructuring, and liquidation ===
In 1997, the logo was changed simply to "Wards" and remained in use until the chain liquidated in 2001.

By the 1990s even its rivals began to lose ground to low-price competition from the likes of Target and Walmart, which eroded even more of Montgomery Ward's traditional customer base. In 1997, it filed for Chapter 11 bankruptcy, emerging from protection by the United States Bankruptcy Court for the Northern District of Illinois in August 1999 as a wholly owned subsidiary of GE Capital, which was by then its largest shareholder.

As part of a last-ditch effort to remain competitive, the company closed over 100 retail locations in 30 U.S. states, abandoned the specialty store strategy, rebranded the chain as simply Wards, and spent millions of dollars to renovate its remaining outlets to be flashier and more consumer-friendly. GE Capital reneged on promises of further financial support of Montgomery Ward's restructuring plans.

On December 28, 2000, after lower-than-expected sales during the Christmas season, the company announced it would cease operating, close its remaining 250 retail outlets, and lay off its 37,000 employees. The following year on March 26, Sears acquired 18 department stores from Montgomery Ward, planning to remodel and reopen these former Ward stores by 2002. Four of these former Montgomery Ward locations were to be converted to The Great Indoors (department store), while 14 were to be converted to Sears.

== As online retailer ==
At its height, the original Montgomery Ward was one of the biggest retailers in the United States. After its demise, the familiarity of its brand meant its name, corporate logo, and advertising were considered valuable intangible assets. In 2004, catalog marketer Direct Marketing Services Inc. (DMSI), an Iowa direct marketing company, purchased much of the intellectual property assets of the former Wards, including the "Montgomery Ward" and "Wards" trademarks, for an undisclosed amount.

DMSI applied the brand to a new online and catalog-based retailing operation, with no physical stores, headquartered in Cedar Rapids, Iowa. DMSI then began operating under the Montgomery Ward branding in June 2004, selling many of the same kinds of products as the original company. The new company does not honor its predecessor's obligations, such as gift cards and items sold with a lifetime guarantee. David Milgrom, then president of the DMSI-owned firm, told the Associated Press, "We're rebuilding the brand, and we want to do it right."

Four years later, in July 2008, DMSI announced it was on the auction block, with the sale of its assets scheduled for the following month. On August 5, 2008, the catalog retailer Swiss Colony purchased DMSI. Swiss Colony—which changed its name to Colony Brands Inc. June 1, 2010—kept Montgomery Ward alive and relaunched the Wards website September 10, 2008, with new catalogs mailing in February 2009. A month before the catalog's launch, Swiss Colony President John Baumann told United Press International the retailer might also resurrect the original Montgomery Ward's Signature and Powr-Kraft store brands. Among the new store brands Wards started under Colony was a home and kitchen brand called Chef Tested. By 2020, some Chef Tested and Montgomery Ward–brand home and kitchen items were being sold on Amazon.com.

== See also ==
- Montgomery Ward Building (disambiguation)
- Montgomery Ward Company Complex – Condominium building in Chicago, Illinois
