= Montgomery Ward Company Complex =

Condominium building in Chicago, Illinois

- U.S. National Register of Historic Places
- U.S. National Historic Landmark
- Chicago Landmark
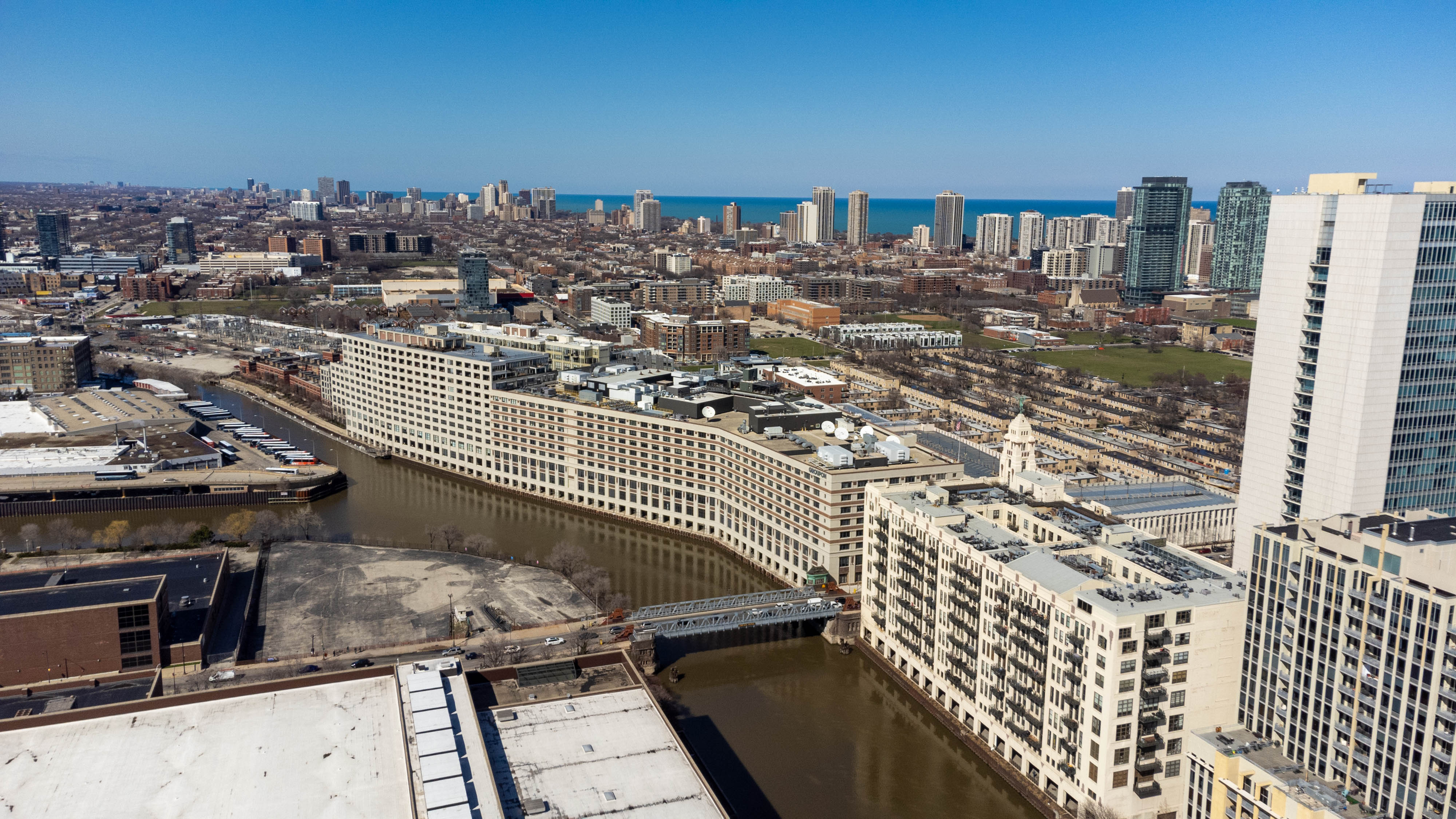
- The complex in April 2022.

- Location within Chicago metropolitan area Location within Illinois Location within the United States
- Location: Chicago, IL
- Coordinates: 41°53′49.94″N 87°38′37.02″W
- Built: 1907
- Architect: Schmidt, Garden and Martin
- Architectural style: Chicago
- NRHP reference No.: 78001125

Significant dates
- Added to NRHP: June 2, 1978
- Designated NHL: June 2, 1978
- Designated CHICL: May 17, 2000 (Catalog House only)

The Montgomery Ward Company Complex is the former national headquarters of Montgomery Ward, the United States' oldest mail order firm. The property is located along the North Branch of the Chicago River at 618 W. Chicago Avenue in Near North Side, Chicago, Illinois. It was listed on the National Register of Historic Places and as a National Historic Landmark on June 2, 1978.

== History ==
The two earliest buildings in the complex, the old Administration Building and the Mail Order House, are constructed of reinforced concrete and were designed by Richard E. Schmidt and Hugh Garden, members of the architectural firm of Schmidt, Garden and Martin.

The 400,000-square-foot (37,000 m^{2}), eight-story Administration Building served as the company's headquarters until 1974, and features sword and torch motifs on the base and vertical piers that rise uninterrupted, culminating in a parapet with motifs similar to the base. A four-story tower was added in 1929 on the northeast corner of the building, with a pyramid roof.

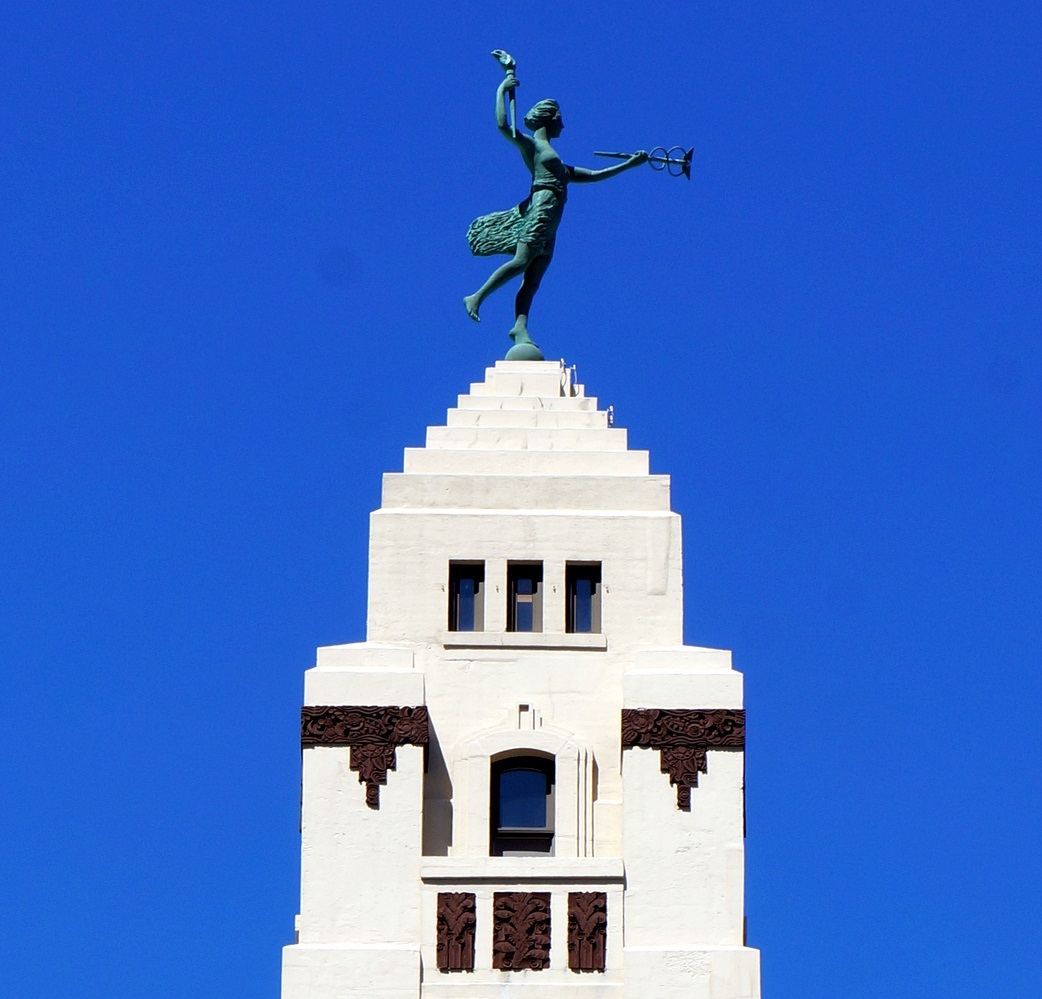
The Spirit of Progress

Crowning the roof of the Administration Building is a 22.5-foot (6.9 m) replica of the bronze statue that was originally placed on top of the old Montgomery Ward Building on Michigan Avenue. An adaption of an earlier statue that had topped both Madison Square Garden in New York and the Agriculture Building at the 1893 World's Columbian Exposition in Chicago was made for the building by the same creators, W. H. Mullins Manufacturing Company of Salem, Ohio and was sculpted by Augustus Saint-Gaudens. The statue is called The Spirit of Progress, and depicts the goddess Diana, dressed in flowing robes, balancing on a globe, and holding a torch in her right hand and a caduceus in her left hand.

Forty feet north of the Administration Building is the 2,000,000-square-foot (190,000 m^{2}) Mail Order House, also known as the Catalog House, that was the heart of Montgomery Ward's operations. Completed in 1908, the eight-story building was painted white and capped with a flat roof, with an interior that contained miles of chutes, conveyors, and storage lofts within ceiling heights ranging from 12 to 17 feet (5.2 m). The west facade, following a bend in the river, is almost 1,100 feet (340 m) long and a single floor covers 6 acres (24,000 m^{2}). At one time the building had its own post office branch and a ground-floor shipping platform that could accommodate 24 railroad freight cars. The Catalog House was designated a Chicago Landmark on May 17, 2000.

In later years, Montgomery Ward and Company added several warehouses and parking structures, followed by a 26-story office building in 1972, designed by architect Minoru Yamasaki, who also designed the former World Trade Center towers in New York City.

== Currently ==
After the bankruptcy of Montgomery Ward in 2001, the earliest buildings were converted into upscale condominiums. The project met the National Historic Landmark criteria for preservation, with the exception of balconies added to the administration building. In 2004, the office tower also was converted to condominiums, now called The Montgomery.

The Mail Order House building is now home to restaurants, the Big Ten Network, Wrigley, Echo Global Logistics, David Barton Gym, Allyu Spa, Kingsbury Yacht Club boat slips, InnerWorkings, Uptake, Dyson Inc., and 298 luxury condominiums. Bankers Life & Casualty's Chicago offices were also located here for several years, until Groupon's expansion led Bankers to move in late 2011. Groupon left in 2023 to consolidate their offices into the Leo Burnett Building.

== See also ==
- List of National Historic Landmarks in Illinois
