= Table Rock, Colorado =

Coordinates: 39.119°N 104.677°W

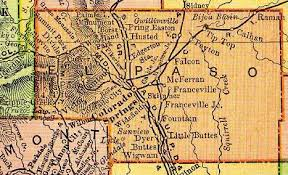
Early El Paso County Colorado map. Table Rock was located northwest of Gwillimville and east of Palmer Lake, in the area of Black Forest.

Table Rock was a settlement in northern El Paso County, Colorado, east of Palmer Lake and Monument. It had a rural post office from 1873 to 1893.

Native Americans traversed through the Palmer Divide, including Table Rock, where evidence of a grave was found on the Table Rock formation, a medicine wheel was found, as well as arrowheads. The tribes that traveled through the area included the Ute, Cheyenne, Arapaho, and Kiowa.

Patrick Murphy came to Table Rock in 1870, homesteaded the land, built a solid-enduring log cabin, and established a farm and ranch of 1,160 acres. Benjamin G. Norvell homesteaded at Table Rock in 1873. J.G. Evans homesteaded at Table Rock in 1884 and established a ranch of 1,750 acres. One of the early families to settle in the area were Eva and Thomas Thompson, who came across the plains in a covered wagon in 1890. They had a ranch at Table Rock. Another was Lou Stepler, a potato farmer.

The first country schoolhouse of El Paso County was built in the settlement. In 1918, a severe flu epidemic hit the area and for the community's safety families often did not hold funerals or held private funerals.

== See also ==
- List of ghost towns in Colorado
