= Tri-Lakes, Colorado =

Region of Colorado, US

Coordinates: 39°06′N 104°52′W

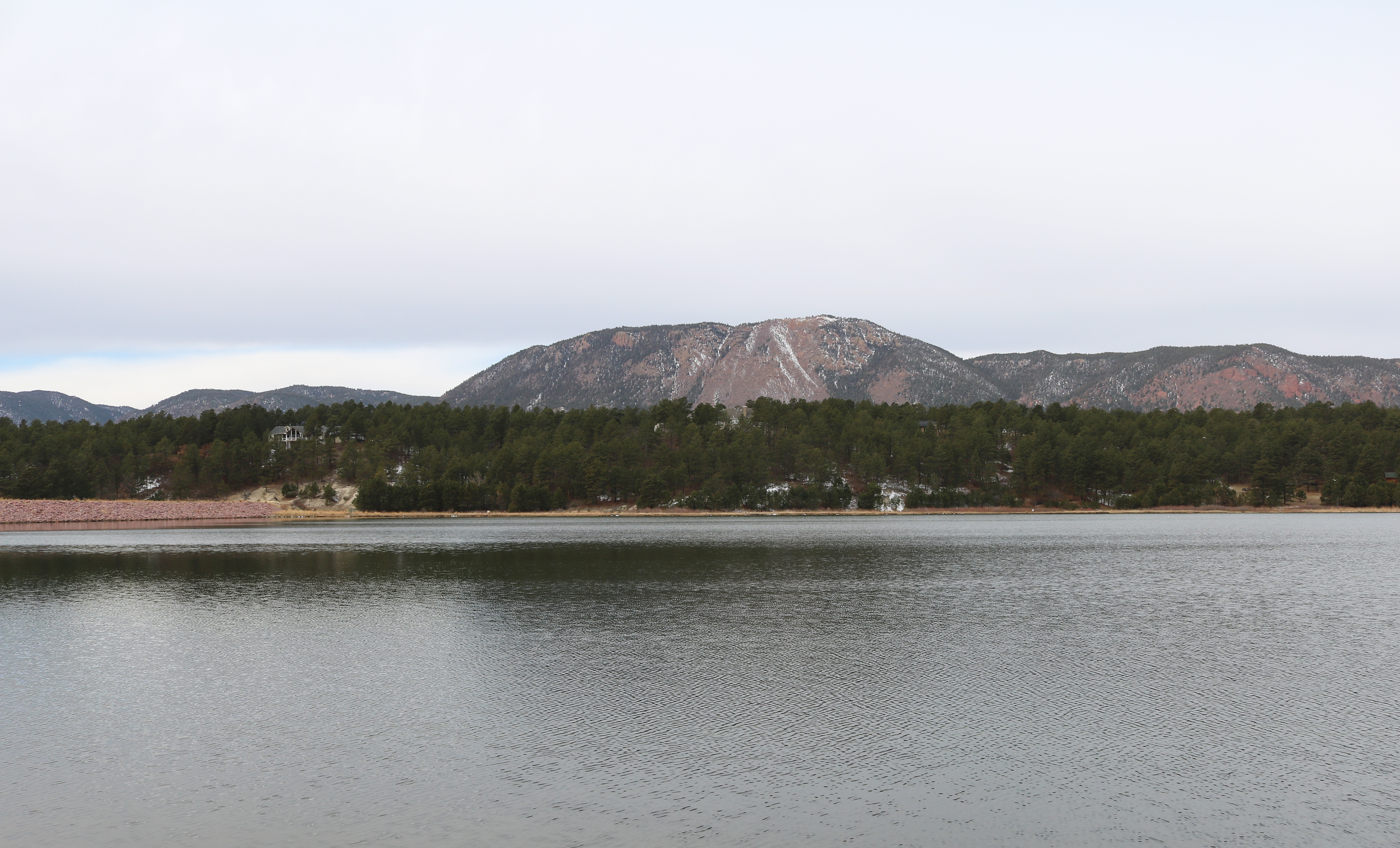
Looking west across Monument Lake in Monument towards Mount Herman

Tri-Lakes is a region of Colorado in northern El Paso County. Taking its name from the three lakes in the region (Monument Lake, Palmer Lake and Lake Woodmoor), Tri-Lakes includes the incorporated towns and unincorporated communities of Monument, Palmer Lake, Woodmoor, Gleneagle, King's Deer, and Black Forest. The region lies along the Palmer Divide about 40 miles (64 kilometers) south of Denver and 20 miles (32 kilometers) north of downtown Colorado Springs. The Air Force Academy is about 5 miles (8.0 kilometers) to the south, and Interstate 25 goes north and south through the region.

== Population ==
At the 2020 census, the population of Palmer Lake was 2,636, the population of Monument was 10,399, the population of Woodmoor was 9,536, the population of Gleneagle was 6,649, and the population of Black Forest was 15,097. The Census Bureau does not calculate a discrete population for King's Deer, so Tri-Lakes' total population is around 44,317. Most of the region lies within the Lewis-Palmer School District.
