= Inez Johnson Lewis =

American educator

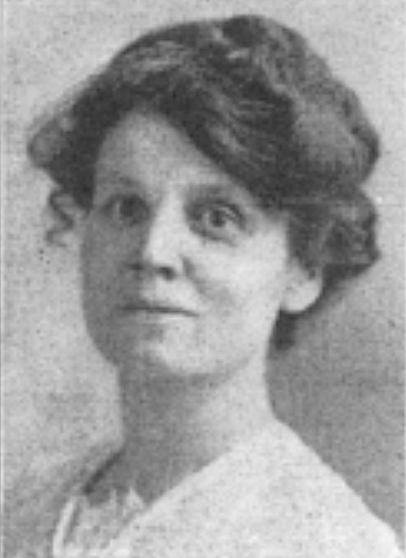
- Inez Johnson Lewis, from a 1916 publication
- Born: Florence Inez Johnson; 1875; Stone County, Missouri
- Died: January 1964; Colorado
- Occupation(s): Educator, state official

Florence Inez Johnson Lewis (1875 – January 1964) was an American educator. She was Colorado's State Superintendent of Public Instruction from 1930 to 1946. From 1937 to 1939, she was president of the National Council of Women in School Administration.

== Early life and education ==
Florence Inez Johnson was born in Stone County, Missouri, the daughter of John Mitchell Johnson and Florence Adah Nelson Johnson. Her father was an attorney and a veteran of the American Civil War. Three of her four sisters also became teachers. She graduated from Colorado Springs High School in 1895. Later in her career, she earned a bachelor's degree from Colorado College, and a master's degree in school administration from Teachers College, Columbia University. In 1935, she received an honorary LLD degree from the University of Colorado.

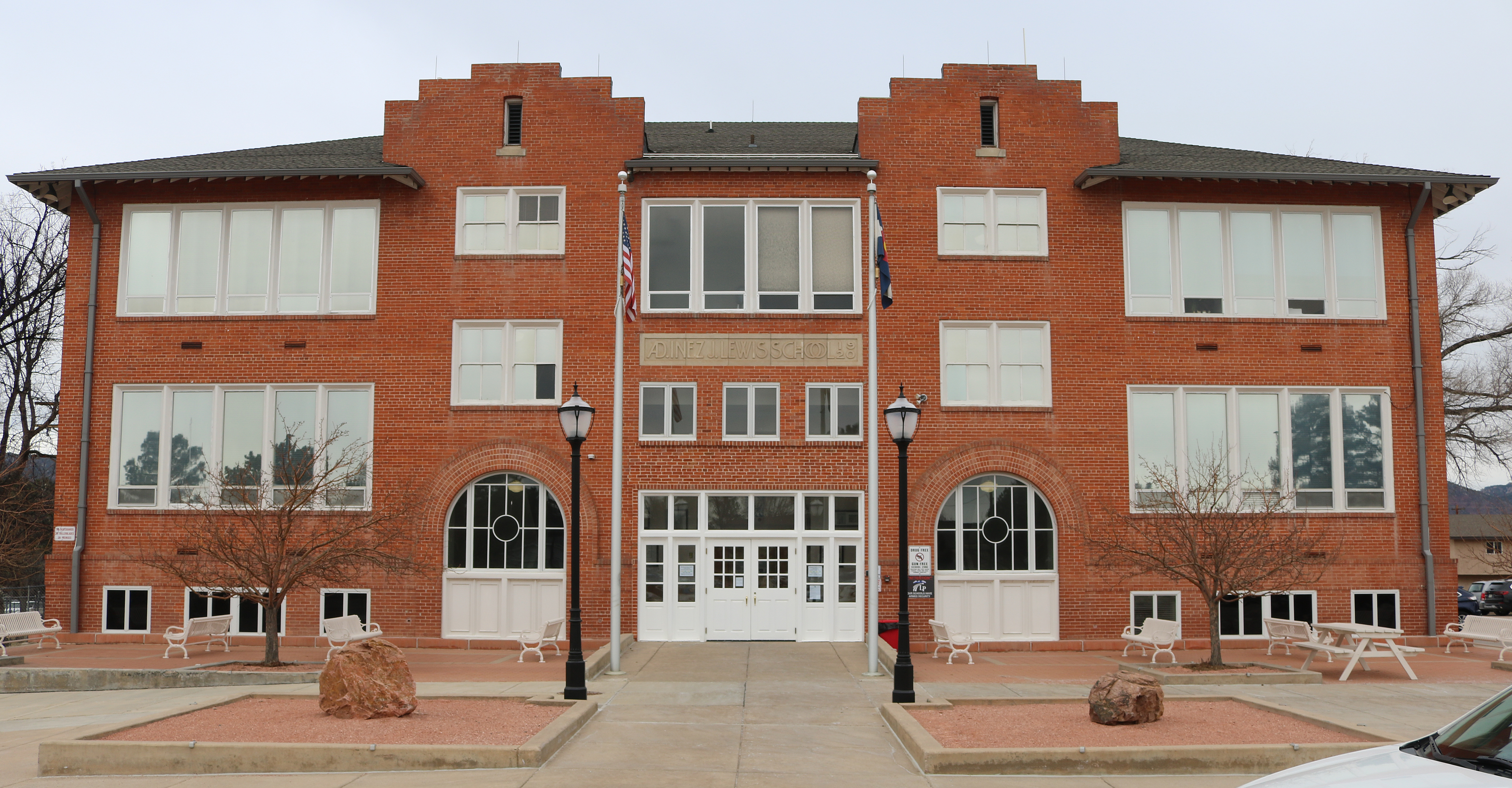
The former Inez Johnson Lewis School in Monument, Colorado, now a school district office

== Career ==
Johnson was a school teacher in Colorado as a young woman. In 1915, she was elected El Paso County Superintendent of Schools. She won re-election seven consecutive times, continuing as county superintendent until 1929. She traveled extensively in her work because many of the schools under her supervision were in remote rural locations. She was known to correspond with dozens of students, both to encourage the students personally, and to monitor the quality of literacy instruction across the county. Under her tenure, the county's residents gained improved access to clean water, preschool, vocational classes, bedside classes for disabled students, library services, hot school lunches, sports and arts as extracurricular activities, and high school programs.

In 1929, Lewis attended the World Federation of Education Associations meeting in Geneva. She ran for the state superintendency in 1928, and lost. In 1930, she ran again, and won. She wrote newspaper essays and spoke on radio about education in Colorado. "I have faith," she wrote, "that people of the state can by intelligent cooperation develop our natural and human resources. This development and growth can only take place by means of education in the broadest sense." She published An Elementary Course of Study for the State of Colorado (1936). She added health, safety, and drivers' education curricula to the state's schools, supported teacher tenure, minimum wage, and retirement benefits, and emphasized aviation industry skills in vocational training, during and after World War II. She lost a re-election bid to Nettie Freed in 1946, part of a Republican sweep of most state-level offices in Colorado.

Lewis was president of the Colorado Education Association and the National Council of Women in School Administration (1937–1939); she was also vice-president of the National Council of Chief State School Officers. She was an active member of the Colorado Child Welfare Board, the Colorado Congress of Parents and Teachers, the American Association of University Women, the General Federation of Women's Clubs, and the Daughters of the American Revolution.

== Publications ==
- "The Teacher Problem of the Rural Schools" (1927)
- Manual of Instructions in Financial Accounting (1933, with Oliver Leonard Troxel)
- An Elementary Course of Study for the State of Colorado (1936)
- Colorado's Wealth: A Bulletin on Conservation of Natural Resources (1941, with Julia B. Tappan)

== Personal life and legacy ==
Inez Johnson married businessman Harry Loring Lewis in 1910. Harry Lewis died in 1923. She died in 1964. The red-brick Inez Johnson Lewis School in Monument, Colorado, built in 1920, is on the National Register of Historic Places; it was named for her, and now houses administrative offices for the Lewis-Palmer School District 38. Colorado College holds a collection of her papers, including correspondence and scrapbooks.
