= Colorado Springs metropolitan area =

Metropolitan area in Colorado, United States

Colorado Springs, CO Metropolitan Statistical Area
- Metropolitan Statistical Area
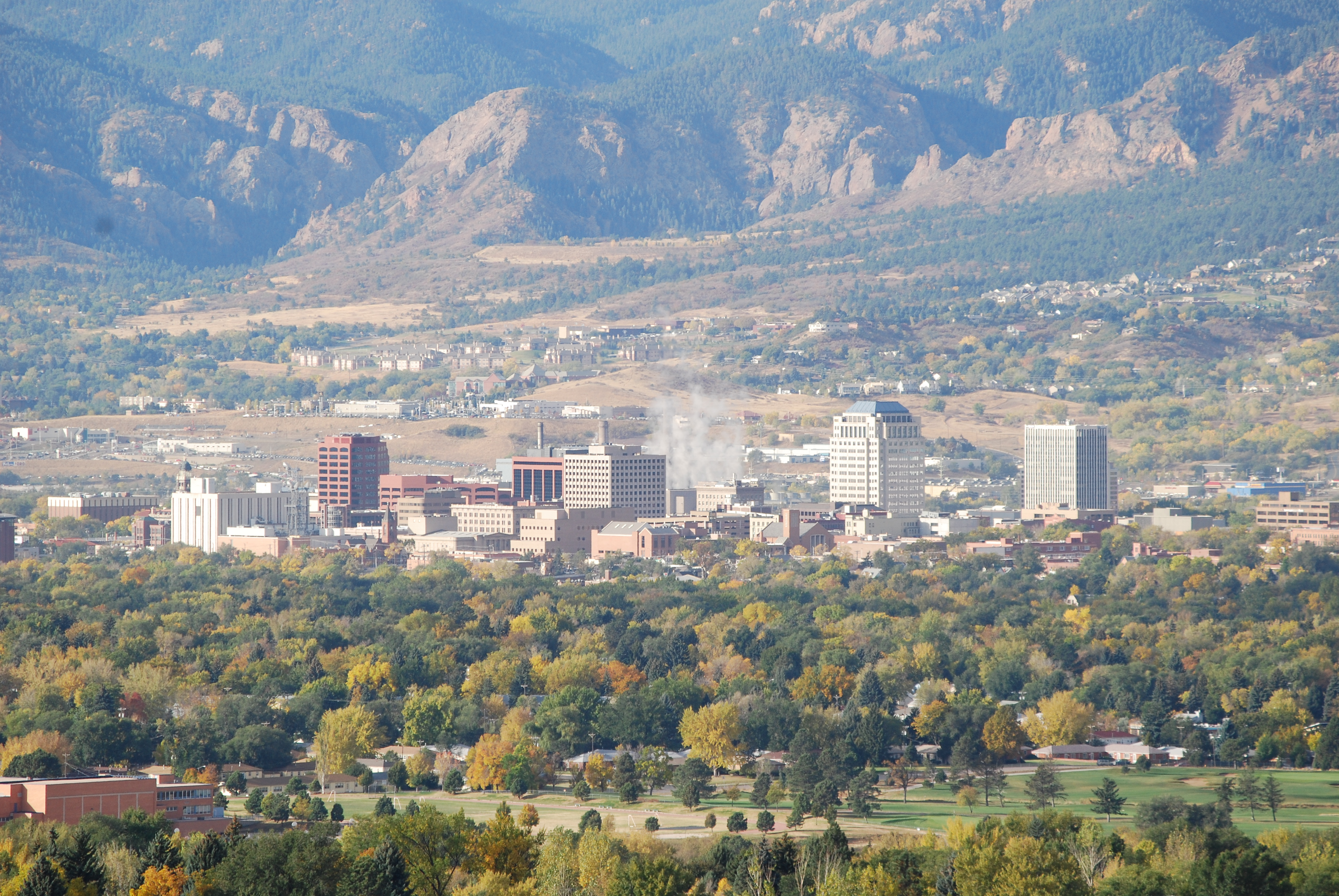
- Colorado Springs skyline with the Front Range in the background
Colorado Springs, CO MSA
City of Colorado Springs
Colorado Springs MSA
- Country: United States
- State: Colorado
- Largest city: Colorado Springs

Area
  - Total: 1,380 sq mi (3,580 km^{2})

Population
  - Total: 755,105

GDP
  - MSA: $47.905 billion (2022)
- Time zone: UTC−7 (MST)
  - Summer (DST): UTC−6 (MDT)

The Colorado Springs, CO, Metropolitan Statistical Area is a United States Office of Management and Budget defined Metropolitan Statistical Area (MSA) located in the Colorado Springs region of the State of Colorado. The 2020 United States census counted a population of 755,105, an increase of 17.0% since the 2010 United States census. The Colorado Springs MSA is the 79th-most populous MSA in the United States. The Colorado Springs MSA encompasses El Paso County and Teller County, Colorado. Approximately 88.40% percent of the MSA's population live in cities or CDPs. The Colorado Springs Metropolitan Statistical Area is the second-most populous component of the Front Range Urban Corridor.

Colorado Springs, CO Metropolitan Statistical Area
County	Seat	2025 estimate	2020 Census	Change	Area	Density
El Paso	Colorado Springs	757,040	730,395	+3.65%	2,130 sq mi (5,500 km^{2})	355/sq mi (137/km^{2})
Teller	Cripple Creek	24,756	24,710	+0.19%	559 sq mi (1,450 km^{2})	44/sq mi (17/km^{2})
Total		781,796	755,105	+3.53%	2,689 sq mi (6,960 km^{2})	291/sq mi (112/km^{2})

== Metropolitan area cities and towns ==
Historical population
Census	Pop.	Note	%±
1960	146,237		—
1970	239,288		63.6%
1980	317,458		32.7%
1990	409,482		29.0%
2000	537,484		31.3%
2010	645,613		20.1%
2020	755,105		17.0%

Places in the Colorado Springs Metropolitan Statistical Area
Place	Name	2020 population	Notes
1	City of Colorado Springs	478,961	
2	Security-Widefield	38,639	CDP
3	City of Fountain	29,802	
4	Cimarron Hills	19,311	CDP
5	Fort Carson	17,693	CDP
6	Black Forest	15,097	CDP
12	Town of Monument	10,399	
7	Woodmoor	9,536	CDP
8	City of Woodland Park	7,920	
11	Gleneagle	6,649	CDP
10	Air Force Academy	6,608	CDP
9	Stratmoor	6,518	CDP
13	City of Manitou Springs	4,858	
14	Town of Palmer Lake	2,636	
15	Cascade-Chipita Park	1,628	CDP
17	Ellicott	1,248	CDP
16	City of Cripple Creek	1,155	
18	Town of Calhan	762	
19	Town of Green Mountain Falls	646	
20	City of Victor	379	
21	Peyton	214	CDP
22	Midland	182	CDP
23	Divide	143	CDP
25	Florissant	128	CDP
24	Town of Ramah	111	
26	Rock Creek Park	68	CDP
27	Goldfield	63	CDP
	TOTAL	661,354	

=== Unincorporated communities ===
- Altman
- Cascade
- Crystola
- Falcon
- Rush
- Truckton
- Yoder

== See also ==
- El Paso County, Colorado
- Teller County, Colorado
- List of statistical areas in Colorado
- List of United States combined statistical areas
- List of United States metropolitan statistical areas
- List of United States micropolitan statistical areas
- List of United States primary statistical areas
- Larger urban regions that contain the Colorado Springs Metropolitan Statistical Area:
  - Front Range Urban Corridor
  - South Central Colorado Urban Area
- Census statistical areas adjacent to Colorado Springs Metropolitan Statistical Area:
  - Cañon City Micropolitan Statistical Area
  - Denver-Aurora Metropolitan Statistical Area
  - North Central Colorado Urban Area
  - Pueblo Metropolitan Statistical Area
