= High Pines, Colorado =

High Pines, Monument, Colorado
- Nickname: North of Woodmoor
- Location in El Paso County and the state of Colorado
- Coordinates: 39°6′36″N 104°50′43″W
- Country: United States
- State: Colorado
- County: El Paso County

Government
  - Type: Unincorporated community

Area
  - Total: 6.4 sq mi (16.5 km^{2})
  - Land: 6.3 sq mi (16.4 km^{2})
  - Water: 0.039 sq mi (0.1 km^{2})
- Elevation: 7,244 ft (2,208 m)
- Time zone: UTC-7 (Mountain (MST))
  - Summer (DST): UTC-6 (MDT)
- ZIP code: 80132
- Area code: 719
- FIPS code: 08-86117
- GNIS feature ID: 1867092

High Pines is an area in El Paso County, Colorado, United States near the statutory town of Monument.

== Geography ==
The approximate center of High Pines is 2 miles due north east of the center of Monument, Colorado.

== Demographics ==
In the community the population was spread out, with 31.0% under the age of 18, 4.4% from 18 to 24, 25.1% from 25 to 44, 31.8% from 45 to 64, and 7.7% who were 65 years of age or older. The median age was 40 years. For every 100 females, there were 103.1 males. For every 100 females age 18 and over, there were 100.6 males.

The median income for a household in the community was $97,359, and the median income for a family was $99,924. Males had a median income of $76,333 versus $38,301 for females. The per capita income for the community was $38,758. About 1.3% of families and 2.5% of the population were below the poverty line, including 4.3% of those under age 18 and 2.8% of those age 65 or over.

== See also ==
- Outline of Colorado
  - Index of Colorado-related articles
- State of Colorado
  - Colorado cities and towns
    - Colorado census designated places
  - Colorado counties
    - El Paso County, Colorado
  - Colorado metropolitan areas
    - Front Range Urban Corridor
    - Colorado Springs, CO Metropolitan Statistical Area
