= Palmer Ridge High School =

Location
- 19255 Monument Hill Road; Monument, Colorado 80132; United States; 39°6′45″N 104°51′44″W

Information
- School type: Public high school
- Motto: Ignite, Engage, Encourage and Expect Excellence
- Established: August 14, 2008 (17 years ago)
- School district: Lewis-Palmer 38
- CEEB code: 061041
- NCES School ID: 080582006369
- Principal: Adam Frank
- Teaching staff: 51.77 (on an FTE basis)
- Grades: 9–12
- Enrollment: 1,066 (2024–2025)
- Student to teacher ratio: 20.59
- Colors: Navy and gold
- Athletics conference: CHSAA
- Mascot: Bears
- Feeder schools: Lewis-Palmer Middle School
- Website: www.lewispalmer.org/prhs

Palmer Ridge High School (PR, or PRHS) is a public high school in Monument, Colorado, United States, serving students in grades 9–12. It is one of two high schools in the Lewis-Palmer School District 38, with admission based primarily on the locations of students' homes.

As of 2024, Palmer Ridge offers 18 varsity sports (7 of which offer both boys and girls teams), 20 Advanced Placement courses, and occupational skills training in partnership with Pikes Peak Community College and the International Salon and Spa Academy.

At the time of its construction in 2008, Palmer Ridge High School was the largest public geothermal project in the state of Colorado.

== History ==
=== Establishment ===
In 2006, the Lewis-Palmer School District decided to build a second high school to alleviate crowding in Lewis-Palmer High School. They intended to take the land of Mary Wissler, a local ranch owner, through the use of eminent domain. Many people were outraged and threatened to recall the school board by collecting thousands of signatures. The district eventually chose another plot of land, located adjacent Interstate-25 near the summit of Monument Hill.

=== Building ===
H+L Architecture designed the building for Palmer Ridge High School. Saunders Construction built the building and completed construction in time for the 2008-2009 school year. The building covered 217,000 square feet (20,200 m^{2}) after its completion.

=== Opening ===
Palmer Ridge High School opened in August 2008, with approximately 530 students and 70 faculty members. As of the 2023-2024 school year, 1107 were enrolled at the school while still maintaining a 22:1 student:teacher ratio.

== See also ==
- Lewis-Palmer School District 38
- Monument, CO
