= Palmer Divide =

Ridge in Colorado, United States

Coordinates: 39.12°N 104.86°W

- Ridge
- Location: Central Colorado

Dimensions
  - Length: 80 miles (130 km)
- Elevation: 1,800 m (6,000 ft)
- Highest elevation: 7,887 feet (2,404 m) (Bald Mountain)

The Palmer Divide is a caprock escarpment-style ridge in central Colorado that separates the Arkansas River basin from the South Platte basin. It extends from the Front Range of the Rockies in central Colorado eastward approximately 80 miles toward the town of Limon. The western end of the Palmer Divide is popularly considered to be at Palmer Lake, located south of Denver and north of Colorado Springs. However, the divide between the two river basins actually extends west and then north to a junction with the Continental Divide at McNamee Peak. It is named after Colorado Springs founder William Jackson Palmer.

For much of its length, it travels very roughly along the northern border of El Paso County. Thus, it forms a natural separator between the Denver and Colorado Springs metropolitan areas. The elevation along the divide varies between about 6,000 and 7,887 feet (1,829 and 2,404 m), with the high point being Bald Mountain in southern Douglas County. This peak can be seen from I-25 just northeast of Monument Hill.

This uplifted area causes a slight increase in precipitation from the rest of eastern Colorado, resulting in the presence of the Black Forest, a peninsula of trees surrounded by dryer grassland plains.. The Palmer Divide is also implicated in enhanced landspout and tornado activity to the east of Denver in the Denver convergence vorticity zone (DCVZ).

This terrain feature is the cause of several small scale (microscale or mesoscale) weather patterns and it can make a great difference in the weather between Denver and Colorado Springs. Although the elevation technically qualifies it for the foothills category, it does not parallel a mountain chain as foothills generally do; instead, the Palmer Divide is perpendicular to the main chain of mountains. Due to the orientation of the Palmer Divide with respect to the eastern plains, the weather can be similar to that of the foothills during active weather with enhanced precipitation, especially during snowstorms. Cities and towns near the Palmer Divide include Parker, Castle Rock, Franktown, Elizabeth, Kiowa, Elbert, Sedalia, Larkspur, Palmer Lake, Monument, and unincorporated communities north of Colorado Springs, such as Gleneagle, Black Forest, and Woodmoor.

== See also ==
- Caprock Escarpment
