= Colorado State Highway 105 =

State highway in Colorado, United States

State Highway 105
- SH 105 highlighted in red

Route information
- Maintained by CDOT
- Length: 9.238 mi (14.867 km)

Major junctions
- South end: CR 105 / Jackson Creek Parkway near Monument
- I-25 / US 85 / US 87 in Monument
- North end: SH 67 near Sedalia

Location
- Country: United States
- State: Colorado
- Counties: El Paso, Douglas

Highway system
- Colorado State Highway System; Interstate; US; State; Scenic
← SH 103	→ SH 109

State Highway 105 (SH 105) is a state highway that runs partially from I-25 in Monument to SH 67 (Manhart Avenue) in Sedalia. The highway serves the communities of Monument and Palmer Lake and the unincorporated areas of Douglas and El Paso counties. Several former sections have been deleted from the state highway system since its inception, thus leading to north and south sections of the current highway.

== Route description ==
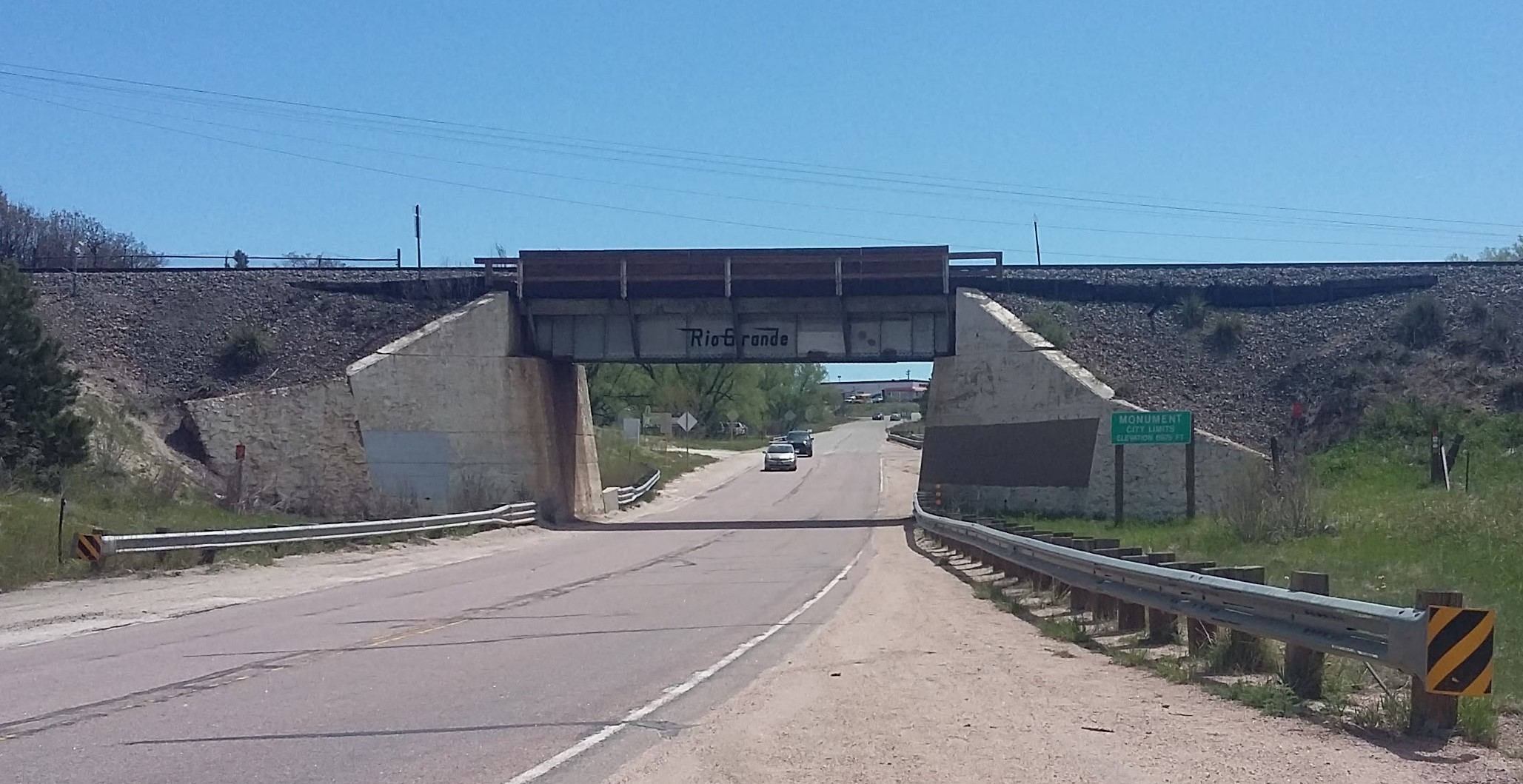
SH 105 at the Monument city limit

SH 105 consists of two segments as it is no longer a continuous highway. The south segment in El Paso County is 4.739 miles (7.627 km) long and it begins at Jackson Creek Parkway and heads west. It interchanges Interstate 25 and then loops around Monument. It then begins a northern trajectory and enters Palmer Lake. After exiting Palmer Lake, the road continues as Spruce Mountain Road and SH 105 then heads due north, and ending at the Douglas County/El Paso County Line, continuing as County Road 105. The north segment is 4.749 miles (7.643 km) long and it continues off of CR 105 at the intersection with Wolfensberger Road in rural Douglas County and heads north via North Perry Park Road. The highway then enters Sedalia and terminates at a junction with SH 67 (Manhart Avenue), facing East Plum Creek.

== History ==
The route was established in the 1920s, when it connected U.S. Highway 87, now Interstate 25, to Sedalia. By 1963, the road was deleted from Palmer Lake to Interstate 25 and the road was paved to its entirety. The road was extended to replace SH 50 (now deleted) due to confusion with U.S. Highway 50. A section from SH 83 to I-25 was deleted in October 2007.

== Major intersections ==
County	Location	mi	km	Destinations	Notes
El Paso	Monument	4.731	7.614	CR 105 east / Jackson Creek Parkway	Southern terminus; route is based on old mileposts. Route continues east as CR 105.
El Paso	Monument	5.000	8.047	I-25 / US 85 / US 87 – Colorado Springs, Denver	Interchange; I-25 exit 161
El Paso	Palmer Lake	9.480	15.257	CR 105 (Perry Park Road)	Northern terminus of South segment. Road continues north as CR 105 (Perry Park Road)
Gap in route
Douglas		28.160	45.319	CR 46 (Wolfensberger Road) / CR 105 (Perry Park Road)	Southern terminus of Northern segment. Road continues south as CR 105 (Perry Park Road)
Douglas		32.628	52.510	SH 67 – Sedalia, Deckers	Northern terminus
1.000 mi = 1.609 km; 1.000 km = 0.621 mi
