= Billy Cook (baseball) =

American baseball player (born 1999)

Pittsburgh Pirates – No. 25
- Outfielder / First baseman
- Born: January 7, 1999 (age 27); Layton, Utah, U.S.
- Bats: Right Throws: Right

MLB debut
- September 8, 2024, for the Pittsburgh Pirates

MLB statistics (through 2026 season)
- Batting average: .207
- Home runs: 3
- Runs batted in: 11
- Stats at Baseball Reference

Teams
- Pittsburgh Pirates (2024–present)

William Monroe Cook (born January 7, 1999) is an American professional baseball first baseman and outfielder for the Pittsburgh Pirates of Major League Baseball (MLB).

== Amateur career ==
Cook attended Lewis-Palmer High School.

Cook played college baseball at Pepperdine from 2018 to 2021. In 2021, Cook was named to the All-WCC First Team. In his career at Pepperdine, Cook hit for a .286 batting average with 26 home runs.

== Professional career ==
=== Baltimore Orioles ===
Cook was drafted by the Baltimore Orioles in the 10th round, with the 287th overall selection, of the 2021 Major League Baseball draft. He spent his first professional season with the rookie–level Gulf Coast League Orioles and Single–A Delmarva Shorebirds, hitting .263 with six home runs, 29 RBI, and 10 stolen bases over 29 total appearances.

Cook spent 2022 with the High–A Aberdeen IronBirds, playing in 113 games and batting .221/.298/.422 with 15 home runs, 65 RBI, and 25 stolen bases. He spent the 2023 campaign with the Double–A Bowie Baysox, slashing .251/.320/.456 with career–highs in home runs (24), RBI (81), and stolen bases (30).

Cook began the 2024 season with 15 games for Bowie, where he slashed .255/.365/.392 with one home run and 10 RBIs, and was promoted to the Triple–A Norfolk Tides in late April. In 70 games for Norfolk, Cook batted .279/.372/.485 with 11 home runs, 43 RBI, and 12 stolen bases.

=== Pittsburgh Pirates ===
On July 30, 2024, the Orioles traded Cook to the Pittsburgh Pirates in exchange for Patrick Reilly. In 30 games for the Triple–A Indianapolis Indians, he slashed .276/.389/.486 with five home runs, 21 RBI, and nine stolen bases. On September 8, Cook was selected to the 40-man roster and promoted to the major leagues for the first time. On September 18, Cook hit his first career home run, a three–run shot off of St. Louis Cardinals reliever Matthew Liberatore. In 16 games for the Pirates during his rookie campaign, Cook batted .225/.225/.449 with three home runs and eight RBI, and 19 strikeouts in 49 at-bats.

Cook was optioned to Triple-A Indianapolis to begin the 2025 season.
