= Black Forest School =

Historic school building in Colorado, US

- U.S. National Register of Historic Places
- Colorado State Register of Historic Properties No. 5EP.1753
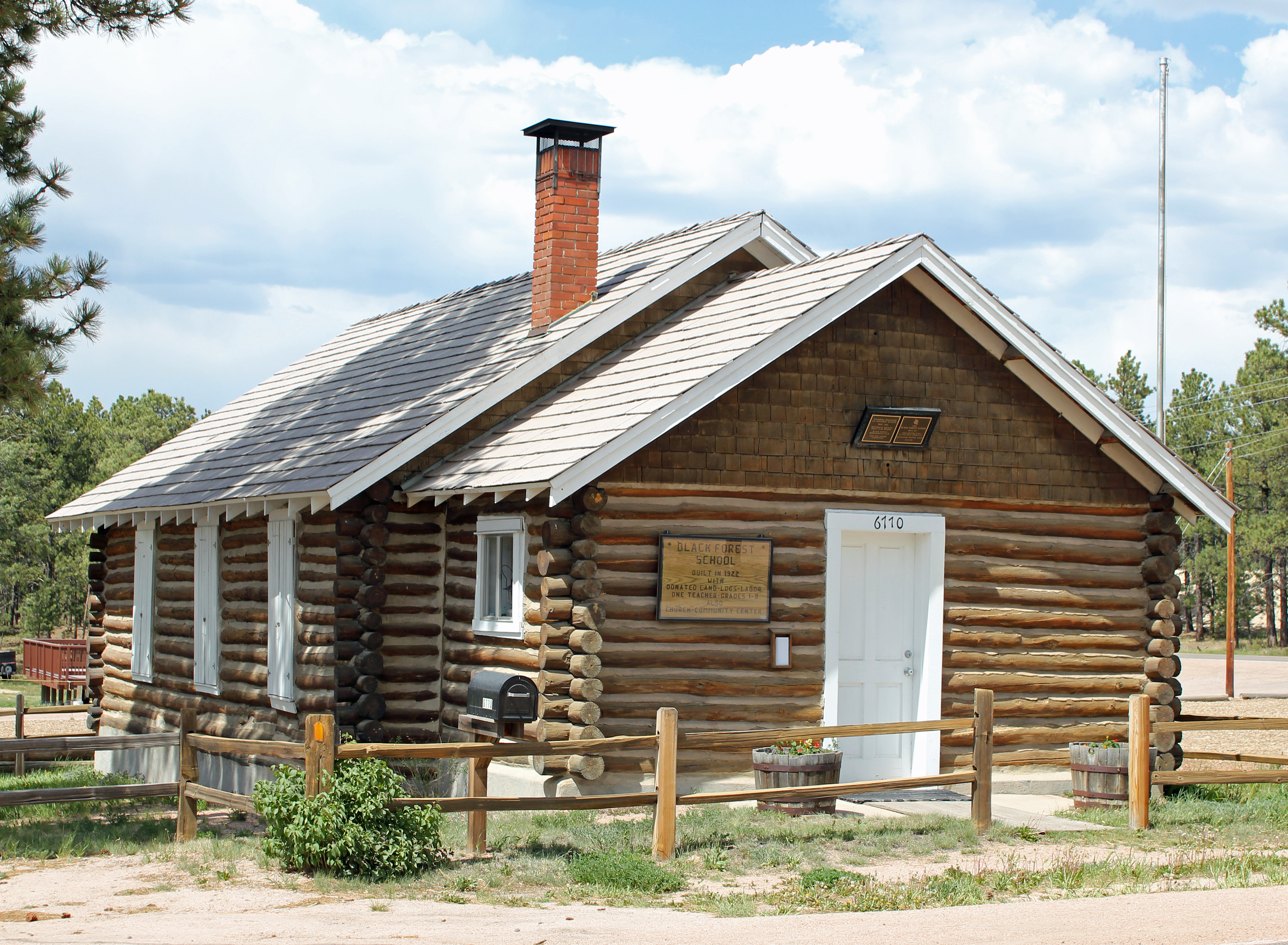
- The school in 2013

- Location within Colorado Location within the United States
- Location: 6770 Shoup, Black Forest, Colorado
- Coordinates: 39°0′46.7″N 104°42′3.9″W
- Built: 1920-1921
- NRHP reference No.: 92001407
- CSRHP No.: 5EP.1753

Significant dates
- Added to NRHP: 1992
- Designated CSRHP: 1992

Black Forest School or Old Log School of Black Forest is a historic school in Black Forest, Colorado. It is a National Register of Historic Places listing and is one of the schools on a multiple submission of "Rural School Buildings in Colorado" for the Colorado State Register of Historic Properties.

Between 1922 and 1945 the building was used as a school house, church and community center building. The school closed in 1945. It was a residence for a county worker and his family from 1947 to 1977. The Friends of the Black Forest Log School was formed to save and restore the building. By 2000, the restoration of the school house was completed and, it is now used for community activities and tours.

== History ==
=== School house ===
The one-room school house was built in 1920-1921 by Black Forest community residents, who also provided the land and building materials. It was the first public building in the Black Forest area. The building, 32 by 22 feet, was constructed with Ponderosa logs. The school room was heated by a coal burning stove with a red brick chimney. It had a well and an outhouse. Children were taught the first to eighth grades beginning in the fall of 1922. In addition to education of children, the building was also used as a church on Sundays, a summer Bible school for children in the summer, and for other events. In 1925, an addition was added to the front of the building for a cloakroom and to store coal. The school closed in 1945 and was consolidated with other rural schools, such as the Forest View School which was 5 miles to the southeast of the Black Forest School. (Note: In 1940, construction was completed on a log church and it was dedicated in 1942.)

=== Residence ===
From 1947 to 1977 the school house was the residence of a man who worked for the county road commission and his family. In 1947, the building was converted to a 2 bedroom home with a living room and kitchen. Electricity was brought into the home, a septic system was added and a new well was dug for the home. Indoor plumbing was installed in one side of the addition in 1951, and a utility room was added to the other side in 1975. The property was abandoned by the county in 1981.

=== Restoration ===
After the school house had been abandoned, the volunteer Friends of the Black Forest Log School began work to have the school restored. In 1992, they submitted an application to the National Register of Historic Places. Community residents volunteered time and donated monies to restore the school. Boy scouts replaced chinking and stained the logs. The Colorado Historical Fund provided funds for much of the major renovation work. It took 2 years to complete the work on the interior. Some of the original structure remains, such as all but 2 of the original logs and the wooden floor. A new foundation was built to solve a drainage problem. The school house was restored by 2000 with a pot-bellied stove, chalkboard, desks, coal, toys and school supplies. The school house is used for community activities, such as "pot lucks, story times and holiday events." Tours are given by the Friends of the Black Forest Log School from 12 to 3 on Thursdays in the summer.

The Friends of the Black Forest Log School was incorporated in 2009.

== Anniversary celebration ==
In 2012, a 90th anniversary celebration was held during the summer. The building had several public openings and celebrations, including games of hopscotch, tug of war and jump rope.

== Other log buildings ==
Near the school house are other log buildings, including a Black Forest store built in the late 1920s, a Community Hall completed in 1929, and a log church completed in 1940.
