= Monument Academy =

- West Campus: 1150 Village Ridge Point, Monument, Colorado 80132; 39.0936°N 104.8468°W; East Campus: 4303 Pinehurst Cir, Colorado Springs, Colorado 80908; 39.0968°N 104.7678°W; El Paso County, Colorado; United States

Information
- School type: Charter school
- Established: 1996
- School district: Lewis-Palmer School District 38
- West Campus principal: Jesse Davis
- East Campus principal: Mason Young
- Grades: K–12
- Enrollment: 1,165 (2026)
- Colors: Blue; Gold; Silver
- Nickname: Lynxes
- Website: monumentacademy.net

Monument Academy (MA) is a charter school located in El Paso County, Colorado. It is a part of the Lewis-Palmer School District 38, being the only charter school within it. Monument Academy was founded in 1996 and is currently a K-12 school with two campuses; an elementary school in Monument, and a middle and high school in Colorado Springs. It also has a preschool and homeschooling program.

== History ==
In 1994, the Colorado Legislature passed the Charter Schools Act. In 1995, a group of parents organized together, believing that they could create a school where "high academic standards, small class sizes, and respect and responsibility are valued and emphasized." This school was established as Lewis-Palmer Charter Academy in 1996. The school would be renamed Monument Academy in 2000.

In the first year, enrollment was approximately 180 students. MA has steadily grown since 1996 to the 2005-2006 school year enrollment of over 600 students. It now includes kindergarten through 8th grade. It previously had a high school program that closed, however in 2017, Monument Academy began planning to open a new high school no sooner than the 2018-19 school year. Monument Academy held a ribbon cutting ceremony on Aug. 29 2020 for the new east campus high school.

In the 2020s, amid heightened discourse in the United States over transgenderism, the school became embroiled in a controversy over its transgender policy.
