= Lewis-Palmer High School =

American high school in Colorado

Location
- 1300 Higby Road; Monument, Colorado 80132; United States; 39°4′50″N 104°51′17″W

Information
- Former name: The Lewis School
- School type: Public high school
- Motto: Expect the Best
- Established: 1920 (106 years ago)
- School district: Lewis-Palmer 38
- CEEB code: 061040
- NCES School ID: 080582001003
- Principal: Jeffery Zick
- Teaching staff: 56.02 (on an FTE basis)
- Grades: 9–12
- Enrollment: 1,171 (2023–2024)
- Student to teacher ratio: 20.90
- Colors: Black and orange
- Athletics conference: CHSAA
- Mascot: Ranger
- Feeder schools: Lewis-Palmer Middle School
- Website: www.lewispalmer.org/lphs

Lewis-Palmer High School (LPHS) is a public high school in Monument, Colorado. It is one of only three high schools in the Lewis-Palmer School District 38, the others being Palmer Ridge High School and Monument Academy High School.

== 2006 Issue ==
The school refused to give its 2006 valedictorian her diploma after she mentioned Jesus Christ in her commencement speech. Erica Corder pursued legal action against the school district. The court ruled against Corder by declaring that the graduation was a school-sponsored event and therefore the school was under the obligation to uphold the constitutional separation between church and state. The court also ruled that the school's policy for graduation speeches was too vague, and thus unconstitutional due to the "chilling effect" that is created by overly broad rules.

== Notable Teacher ==
In 2015, Kathy Thirkell won the Colorado Teachers of the Year award.

== Notable alumni ==
- Bobby Burling, professional MLS player, attended Lewis-Palmer High School
- Billy Cook, MLB baseball player
- Pat Garrity, basketball player who played ten years in the NBA
- Kim Lyons, personal trainer, appeared on The Biggest Loser
- Josh Scott (basketball), professional basketball player and former University of Colorado basketball star.
- Jennifer Sipes, actress and model, born in Monument, attended Lewis-Palmer High School
- Derek Theler, actor and model, attended Lewis-Palmer High School
