= Pat Garrity =

American basketball player (born 1976)

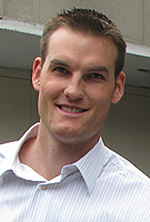
- Garrity at the Air Canada Centre in 2008

Notre Dame Fighting Irish
- Title: General manager
- League: Atlantic Coast Conference

Personal information
- Born: August 23, 1976 (age 50) Las Vegas, Nevada, U.S.
- Listed height: 6 ft 9 in (2.06 m)
- Listed weight: 238 lb (108 kg)

Career information
- High school: Lewis-Palmer (Monument, Colorado)
- College: Notre Dame (1994–1998)
- NBA draft: 1998: 1st round, 19th overall pick
- Drafted by: Milwaukee Bucks
- Playing career: 1998–2008
- Position: Power forward
- Number: 8

Career history
- 1998–1999: Phoenix Suns
- 1999–2008: Orlando Magic

Career highlights
- Consensus second-team All-American (1998); Big East Player of the Year (1997); 2× First-team All-Big East (1997, 1998); Third-team All-Big East (1996)

Career NBA statistics
- Points: 4,017 (7.3 ppg)
- 3PFG: 631
- 3P%: .398
- Stats at NBA.com
- Stats at Basketball Reference

Patrick Joseph Garrity (born August 23, 1976) is an American former professional basketball player who is the general manager of the Notre Dame Fighting Irish men's and women's teams. He played in the National Basketball Association (NBA) for the Phoenix Suns and Orlando Magic from 1998 to 2008 as a power forward best known as a three-point marksman. He previously served as an assistant general manager of the Detroit Pistons from 2016 to 2020.

== Early life ==
At Lewis-Palmer High School in Monument, Colorado, Garrity was a starter on the basketball team for four seasons and won all-state honors three times. He led the basketball team to the 1994 Class 4A State of Colorado Championship and was valedictorian of his graduating class. Garrity averaged 23.2 points per game in his senior year. His jersey, number 53, is retired at Lewis-Palmer High School.

== College career ==
At the University of Notre Dame, Garrity played four years with the Fighting Irish averaging double-digits in scoring in all four seasons, including a 23.2 point-per-game average in his senior season of 1997–98. He was the Big East Men's Basketball Player of the Year in 1997. In 1998, he was a Consensus Second Team All-America selection. He was a two-time Academic All-America selection as well as Academic All-American of the Year for Division I men's basketball in 1998.

== Professional career ==
Garrity was drafted by the Milwaukee Bucks with the 19th pick of the 1998 NBA draft. The Bucks traded his rights and the rights to Dirk Nowitzki, to the Dallas Mavericks for the rights to Robert Traylor. (Note: Landon Buford of Sports Illustrated ranked this trade as one of the most lopsided trades in NBA history, while Dave Zirin of The Nation ranked it the most lopsided trade in NBA history. Nowitzki "would go on to have a distinguished 21-year career where he was an All-Star 14 times, a member of the All-NBA team 12 times, a league and Finals MVP, and an NBA champion in 2011", while Traylor struggled in the NBA.) Garrity's rights, along with Martin Müürsepp, Bubba Wells, and a first-round draft pick, were traded to the Phoenix Suns in exchange for Steve Nash.

A power forward, Garrity was known for his three-point marksmanship during his NBA career.

In Phoenix, Garrity averaging 5.6 points per game in 39 appearances (in an NBA lockout-shortened 50-game regular season). On August 5, 1999, he was traded—along with Danny Manning and two future draft picks—to the Orlando Magic for Penny Hardaway. Garrity spent the rest of his playing career with the Magic.

Garrity played in all 82 games with Orlando in 1999–2000, averaging 8.2 points per game and shooting 40.1 percent from three-point territory. In the 2000–2001 season, he averaged 8.3 points per game in 76 games. In February 2001, Garrity had arthroscopic surgery on his left knee. In 2001–02, Garrity's scoring average hit a career-high of 11.1 points per game as he started 43 of the 80 games he played. On March 19, 2002, in a 101–91 win over the Milwaukee Bucks, Garrity made a career-high seven three-pointers on his way to a 21-point total. During the season, he ranked seventh in the NBA in both three-point field goal percentage and three-point field goals made. Garrity's average dipped to 10.7 points per game in 2002–03. That season, on November 2, 2002, Garrity scored 13 points and grabbed a career-high 15 rebounds in a 100–90 win over the Bucks. Garrity participated in the 2001 and 2003 Three-Point Contests during NBA All-Star Weekend.

Beginning in 2003, Garrity's career was affected by right knee problems. Garrity's 2003–04 campaign ended after only two games due to an injured right knee. He underwent three different knee procedures in 2003 before undergoing microfracture surgery in 2004. Garrity came back to play in 71 games for the Magic during the 2004–2005 season, averaging 4.6 points per game. In April 2005, he tore the anterior cruciate ligament (ACL) in his right knee and was ruled out for the rest of the season.

Garrity served as secretary-treasurer of the National Basketball Players Association.

On January 26, 2006, Garrity scored 24 points in a 119–115 overtime win against the Philadelphia 76ers. On September 11, 2008, he announced his retirement from professional basketball.

== Post-playing career ==
Garrity worked for Bridgewater Associates before returning to the NBA as director of strategic planning for the Detroit Pistons. On June 15, 2016, Garrity was promoted and became the assistant general manager of the Detroit Pistons. Garrity left the position in July 2020.

In May 2025, Garrity was named general manager of both the Notre Dame men's and women's teams.

== NBA career statistics ==
Legend
GP	Games played	GS	Games started	MPG	Minutes per game
FG%	Field goal percentage	3P%	3-point field goal percentage	FT%	Free throw percentage
RPG	Rebounds per game	APG	Assists per game	SPG	Steals per game
BPG	Blocks per game	PPG	Points per game	**Bold**	Career high

=== Regular season ===
Year	Team	GP	GS	MPG	FG%	3P%	FT%	RPG	APG	SPG	BPG	PPG
1998–99	Phoenix	39	9	13.8	**.500**	.389	.714	1.9	.5	.2	.1	5.6
1999–00	Orlando	**82**	1	18.0	.441	.401	.721	2.6	.7	.4	.2	8.2
2000–01	Orlando	76	1	20.8	.387	**.433**	.867	2.8	.7	.5	.2	8.3
2001–02	Orlando	80	43	30.1	.426	.427	.836	**4.2**	1.2	**.8**	**.3**	**11.1**
2002–03	Orlando	81	**53**	**31.9**	.419	.396	.830	3.8	**1.5**	**.8**	.2	10.7
2003–04	Orlando	2	0	11.0	.333	.000	.000	.0	.5	.0	.0	1.0
2004–05	Orlando	71	0	13.5	.402	.333	.879	1.7	.4	.3	.1	4.6
2005–06	Orlando	57	0	16.5	.417	.388	.811	1.9	.7	.2	.2	4.9
2006–07	Orlando	33	0	8.4	.314	.344	**.889**	1.3	.4	.2	.0	2.2
2007–08	Orlando	31	0	9.2	.338	.216	.800	1.4	.4	.2	.0	2.1
Career		552	107	20.0	.417	.398	.806	2.6	.8	.4	.1	7.3

=== Playoffs ===
Year	Team	GP	GS	MPG	FG%	3P%	FT%	RPG	APG	SPG	BPG	PPG
1999	Phoenix	3	0	17.3	**.529**	**1.000**	**1.000**	3.0	.3	.3	.3	9.0
2001	Orlando	4	0	29.3	.472	.500	.800	1.3	.5	.0	.2	**12.0**
2002	Orlando	4	**4**	**36.8**	.375	.389	.750	**7.5**	**2.3**	**.5**	.2	8.5
2003	Orlando	**7**	1	23.3	.286	.235	**1.000**	2.6	.7	.3	**.4**	4.0
2008	Orlando	2	0	3.0	.000	.000	.500	1.0	.0	.0	.0	.5
Career		20	5	24.3	.393	.407	.857	3.2	.9	.2	.3	6.9
