= Lewis-Palmer School District 38 =

School district in Colorado, United States

Coordinates: 39°05′27″N 104°52′15″W

The Lewis-Palmer School District (LPSD) is a school district in El Paso County, Colorado that serves the Tri-Lakes communities of Monument, Palmer Lake, Woodmoor and select areas of Colorado Springs.

Lewis-Palmer School District is home to Colorado's largest public geothermal project, Palmer Ridge High School.

The district was "Accredited with Distinction" by the State of Colorado in 2010, recognizing that it is within the top 7% of Colorado school districts.

Like many American school systems, LPSD enforces zero-tolerance policies.

The Inez Johnson Lewis School in Monument is on the List of Registered Historic Places in Colorado.

== Schools ==
=== Elementary schools ===
- Bear Creek Elementary School
- Kilmer Elementary School
- Lewis-Palmer Elementary School
- Palmer Lake Elementary School
- Prairie Winds Elementary School

Bear Creek Elementary was created to replace Grace Best Elementary, which closed in mid-2010. It is in the building where Creekside Middle School was previously located.

=== Middle schools ===
- Lewis-Palmer Middle School

=== High schools ===
- Lewis Palmer High School
- Palmer Ridge High School

=== Charter schools ===
Monument Academy is a charter school located in Monument, and is the only charter school in Lewis-Palmer District 38. In 1995, a group of parents came together believing that they could create a school where high academic standards, small class sizes, respect, and responsibility were valued and emphasized. Lewis-Palmer Charter Academy (renamed Monument Academy in 2000) was founded in 1996.

In the first year, enrollment was approximately 180 students. MA has steadily grown since 1996 to the 2005–2006 school year enrollment of over 600 students. It now includes kindergarten through 8th grade. It previously had a high school program that closed, however in 2017, MA began planning to open a new high school no sooner than the 2018–19 school year. MA held a ribbon cutting ceremony on Aug. 29 2020 for the new east campus high school.

As a charter school, it is a publicly funded, tuition-free school created by parents, teachers, and community members. MA is required to meet or exceed district and state academic standards, as well as abide by all state and federal non-discrimination, health and safety laws. Recently however MA come under controversy allegedly violating SB08-200 with its new dress code implemented into the high school.

Monument Academy is called a Public School of Choice.

== See also ==
- List of school districts in Colorado
