= Monument Hill (Colorado) =

Mountain pass in Colorado, USA

- Black Forest Divide Pass
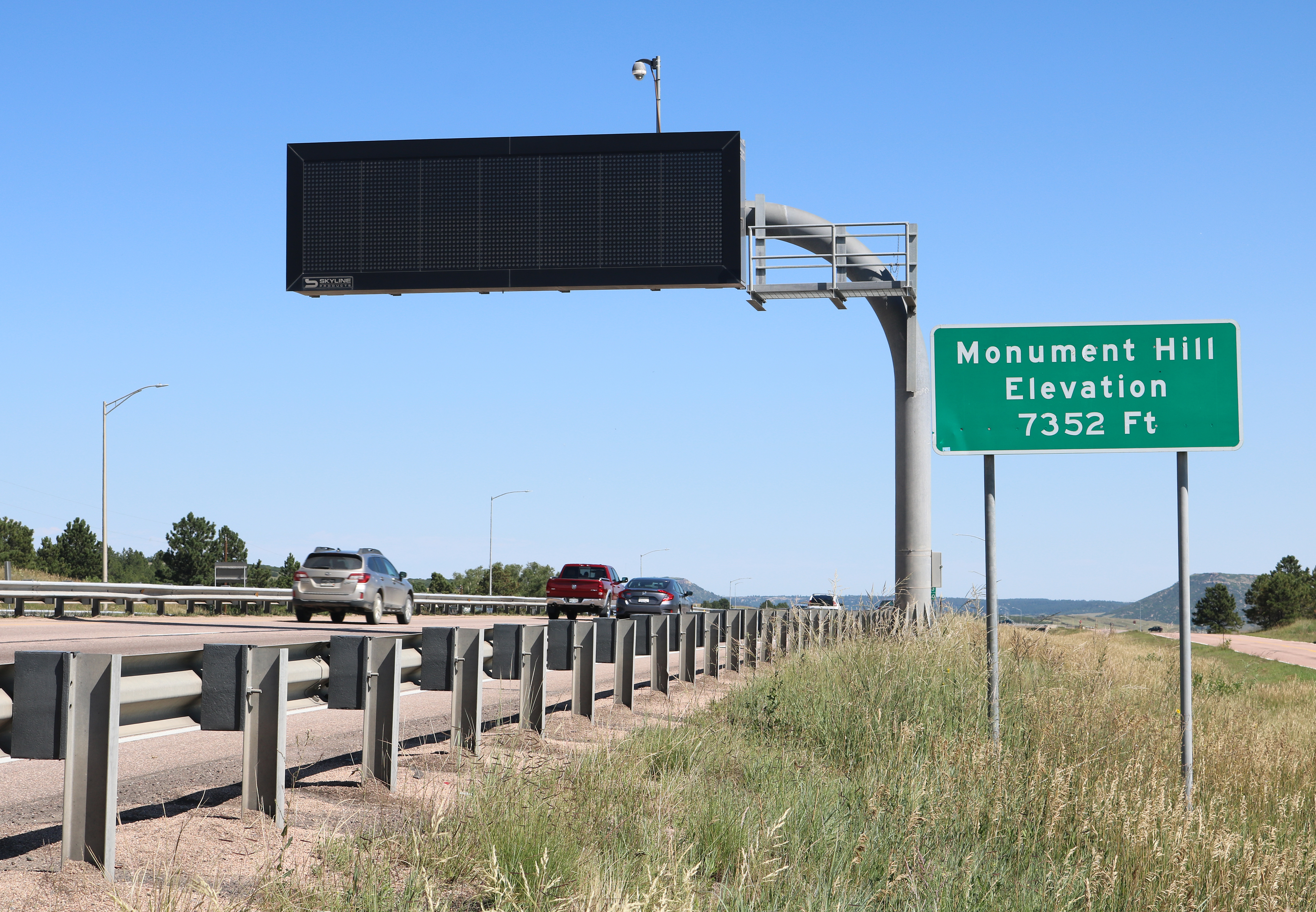
- Looking north at the pass.
- Interactive map of Monument Hill
- Elevation: 7,352 ft (2,241 m)
- Traversed by: I-25

Third Approach
- Location: El Paso County, Colorado
- Coordinates: 39°07′26″N 104°51′53″W

Monument Hill or Black Forest Divide Pass is a 7,352 feet (2,241 m) elevation mountain pass in the Palmer Divide in central Colorado in the United States. The pass dividing the Arkansas River drainage system to the south and the Platte River drainage system to the north is the high point on I-25 between Denver and Colorado Springs.

== See also ==
- Castle Rock, Colorado
- Colorado Springs, Colorado
- Monument, Colorado
