= Truckton, Colorado =

- Unincorporated community
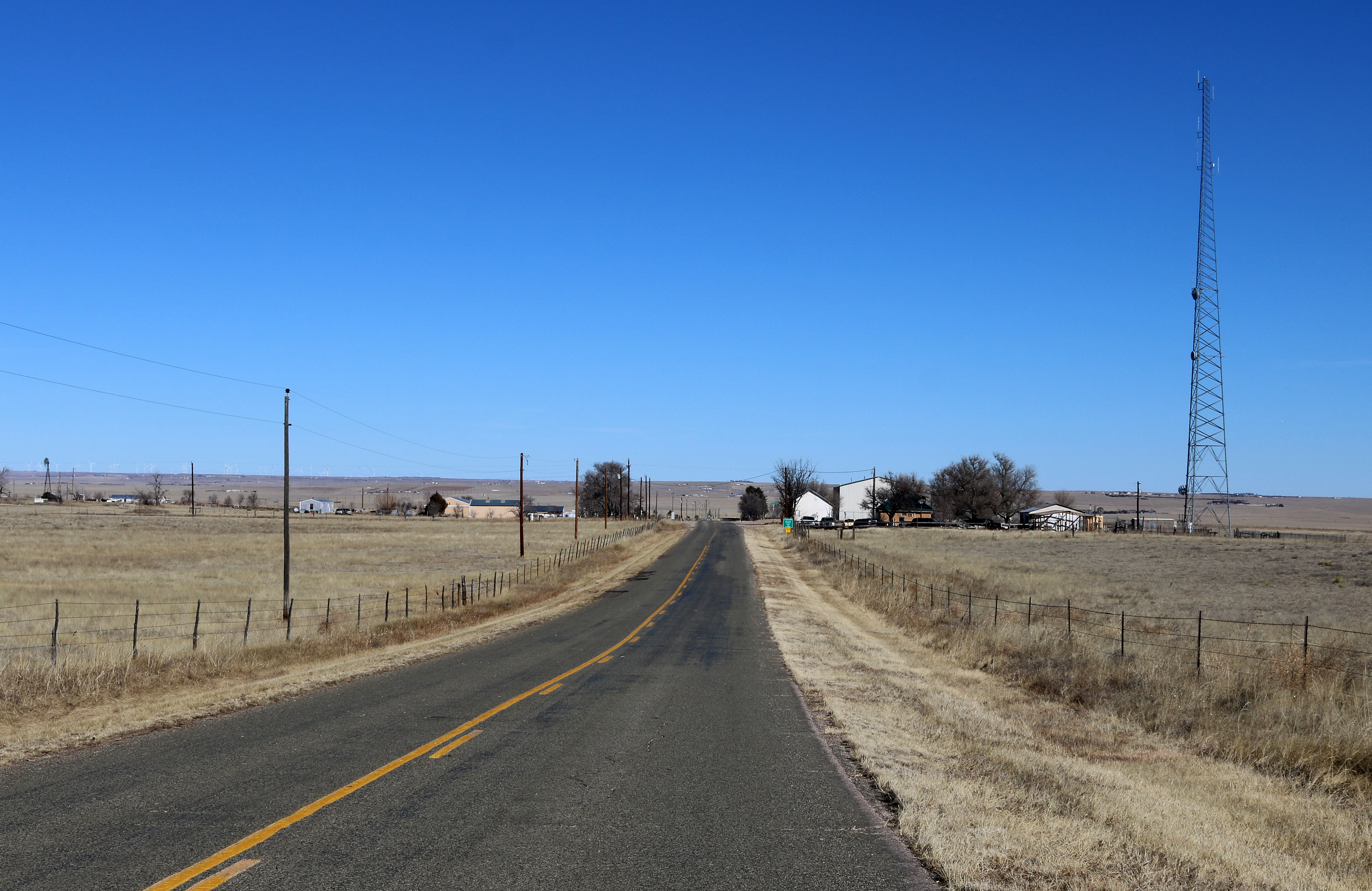
- Looking north from just south of Truckton.

- Location within the state of Colorado
- Coordinates: 38°44′17″N 104°10′56″W
- Country: United States
- State: Colorado
- County: El Paso
- Elevation: 6,024 ft (1,836 m)
- Time zone: UTC-7 (Mountain (MST))
  - Summer (DST): UTC-6 (MDT)
- ZIP codes: 80864
- Area code: 719
- GNIS feature ID: 193631

Truckton is an unincorporated community in El Paso County, Colorado, south of State Highway 94.
