= Inez Johnson Lewis School =

- U.S. National Register of Historic Places
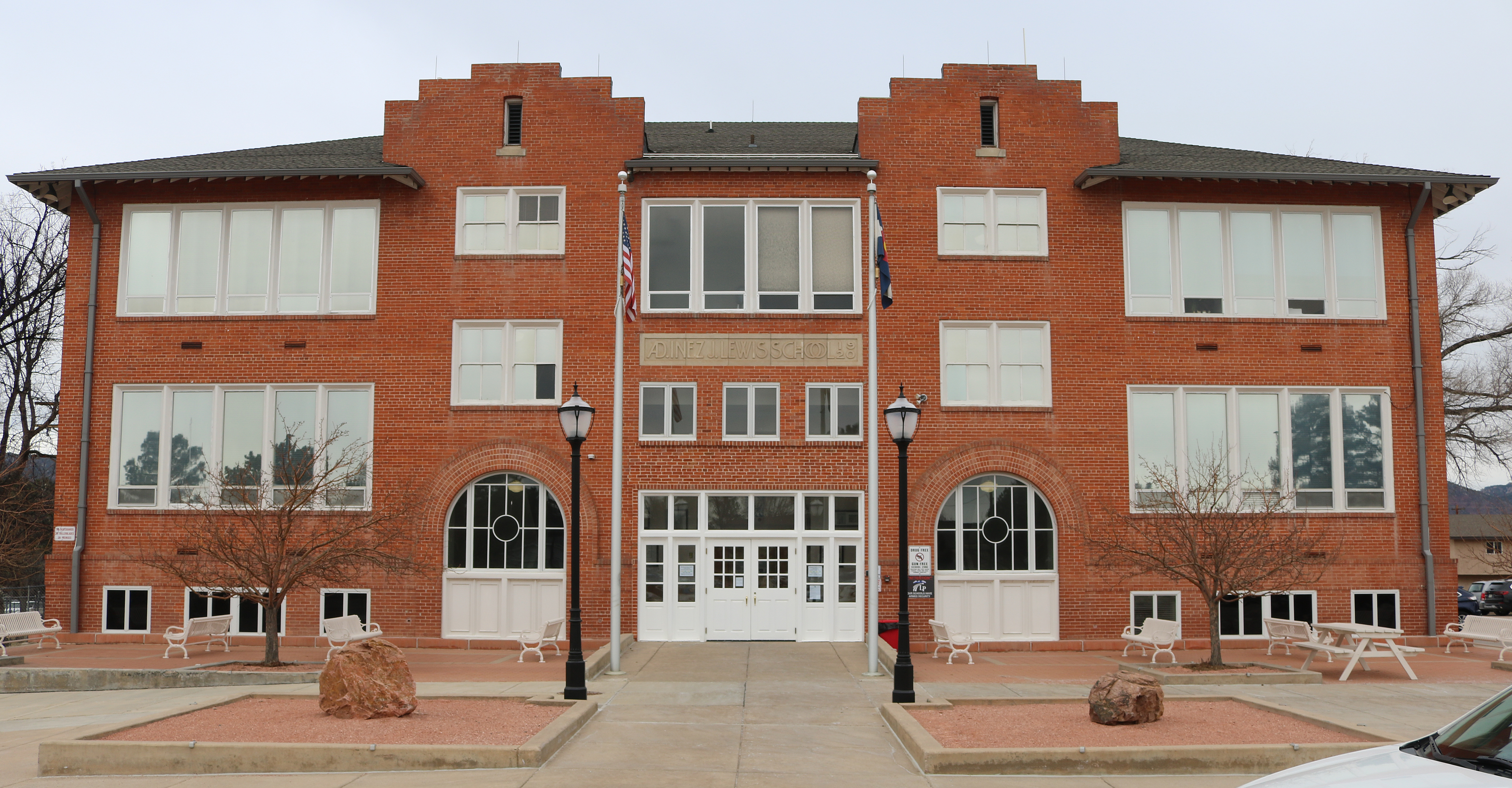
- The school building in 2023

- Location within Colorado Location within the United States
- Location: 146 Jefferson St., Monument, Colorado
- Coordinates: 39°05′27″N 104°52′15″W
- Built: 1920
- Built by: D.R. Robb
- Architect: MacLaren & Hetherington
- Architectural style: Mission/Spanish Revival, Spanish Colonial Revival
- NRHP reference No.: 88002306
- Added to NRHP: November 03, 1988

The Inez Johnson Lewis School, also known as Lewis-Palmer School District #38 Administration Building, is a building in Monument, Colorado. It was designed by architects MacLaren & Hetherington of Colorado Springs and was built in 1920. It was listed on the National Register of Historic Places in 1988.

The school was deemed historically significant not for its architecture, but as a symbol of "educational developments and advancements" in its county, El Paso County, Colorado. It was one of the first built for purpose of consolidating students from former rural schools so that a higher quality education could be provided. It is typical of school buildings constructed by the county in the 1920s. The building was named for Inez Johnson Lewis, superintendent of El Paso County Schools from 1915 to 1929, and Colorado's state superintendent of schools from 1930 to 1946.

== See also ==
- National Register of Historic Places listings in El Paso County, Colorado
