= Palmer Lake, Colorado =

Town in Colorado, United States

- Town
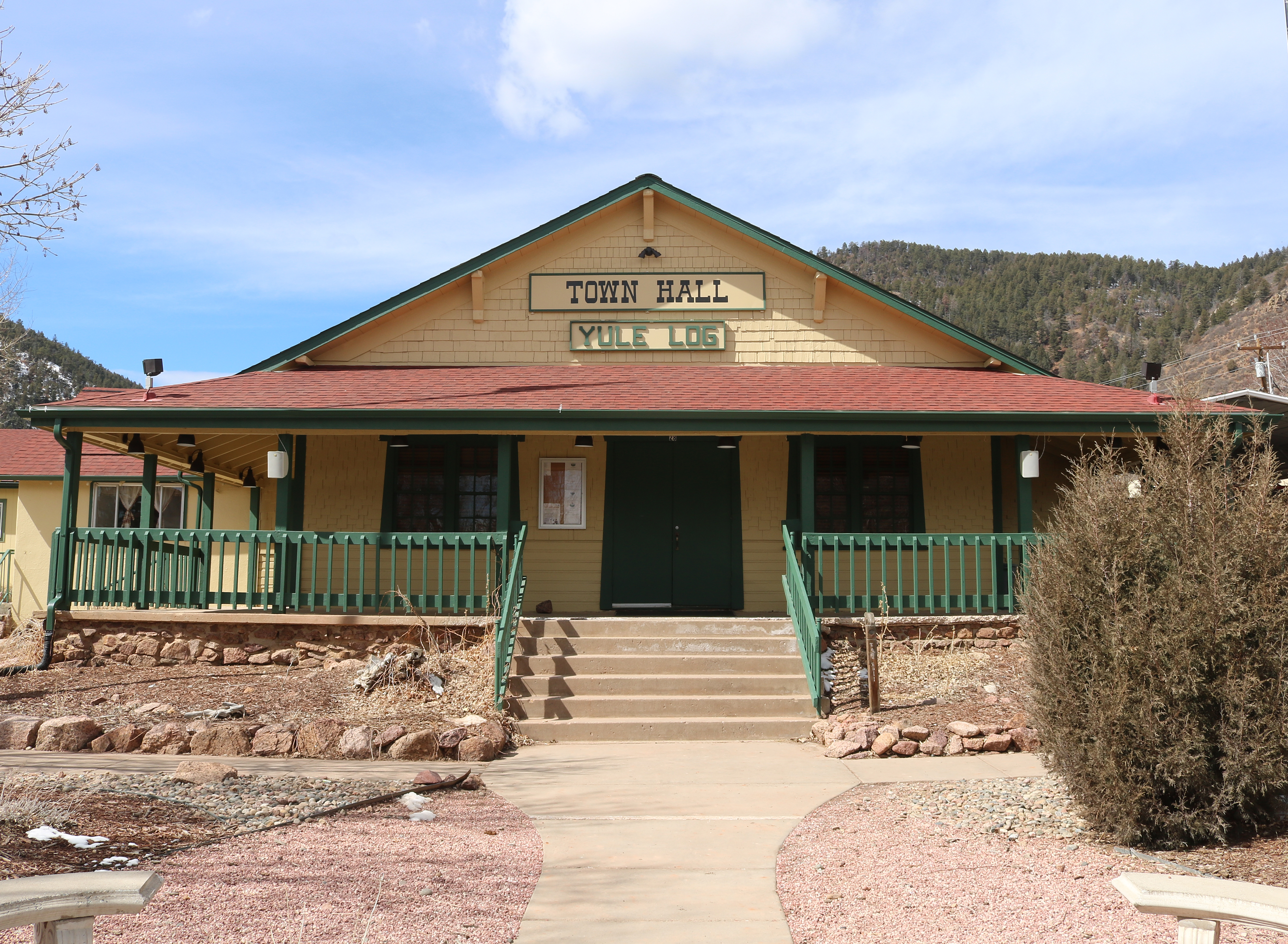
- Palmer Lake Town Hall; Yule Log Hunt is held each December.

- Flag Logo

- Location of Palmer Lake in El Paso County, Colorado.
- Coordinates: 39°06′54″N 104°54′18″W
- Country: United States
- State: Colorado
- County: El Paso
- Incorporated (town): March 12, 1889

Government
  - Type: Statutory Town

Area
  - Total: 3.09 sq mi (8.01 km^{2})
  - Land: 3.07 sq mi (7.95 km^{2})
  - Water: 0.023 sq mi (0.06 km^{2})
- Elevation: 7,139 ft (2,176 m)

Population (2020)
  - Total: 2,636
  - Density: 859/sq mi (332/km^{2})
- Time zone: UTC-7 (Mountain (MST))
  - Summer (DST): UTC-6 (MDT)
- ZIP code: 80133
- Area code: 719
- FIPS code: 08-57025
- GNIS feature ID: 2413103
- Website: www.townofpalmerlake.com

Palmer Lake is a statutory town in El Paso County, Colorado, United States. The population was 2,636 at the 2020 census. Palmer Lake was founded by General William Jackson Palmer in 1871 and was incorporated in 1889.

Palmer Lake is one of three communities in the Tri-Lakes region between Denver and Colorado Springs. The three lakes are Palmer Lake, Monument Lake, and Lake Woodmoor. Located off Interstate 25 near two major metropolitan centers, Palmer Lake is a growing community on the Front Range of the Rocky Mountains.

Downtown Palmer Lake, though small, features restaurants and coffee shops on Colorado Highway 105. There is also a library, town hall, and a historical museum. The Tri-Lakes Center for the Arts, a nonprofit fine arts venue, features rotating art exhibitions and concert events with nationally recognized artists.

The town's water comes from two reservoirs in the mountains behind the town and from wells. Both reservoirs and Monument Creek, which flows out of them, are considered part of the town's watershed. The town's namesake lake dried up completely during the summer of 2012 due to Douglas County stopping the water supply. They have allowed Palmer Lake a third of the previous area for aesthetics but will not allow drainage to travel through as it used to be. The town's Board of Trustees held a firm stance against transferring water from the reservoirs to be stored in the lake, asking "Should our water supply be protected for the health and safety of all of our citizens, or should it be utilized for mostly aesthetic purposes?" Downtown businesses and resident morale suffered greatly due to the lack of any surface water within city limits. By 2014, the lake was nearly dry again

Library services for the city are provided by the Palmer Lake Branch Library, located at 66 Lower Glenway in Palmer Lake.

== Geography ==
Palmer Lake is bordered by the Greenland Open Space Preserve to the north, Pike National Forest to the west, Monument to the south, and Ben Lomand and the I-25 corridor to the east. Palmer Lake sits at the north edge of El Paso County and offers sweeping views of the Rocky Mountain foothills.

According to the United States Census Bureau, the town has a total area of 3.1 square miles (8.0 km^{2}). 3.1 square miles (8.0 km^{2}) of this is land and 0.04 square miles (0.10 km^{2}) of it (0.65%) is water.

The town marks the top of the Palmer Divide, a ridge running from Palmer Lake eastward which separates the Arkansas River drainage to the south from the Platte River drainage to the north. The highest point of the divide is about 7,700 feet (2,300 m) above sea level at Vollmer Hill located in the Black Forest. At Monument Hill the elevation is about 7,352 feet (2,241 m). It staggers along the county line between Douglas County and El Paso County. This divide separates the Denver metropolitan area from the Pikes Peak area. The town's namesake, Palmer Lake, is situated at 7,250 feet (2,210 m).

== Demographics ==
Historical population
Census	Pop.	Note	%±
1900	166		—
1910	163		−1.8%
1920	160		−1.8%
1930	244		52.5%
1940	269		10.2%
1950	263		−2.2%
1960	542		106.1%
1970	947		74.7%
1980	1,130		19.3%
1990	1,480		31.0%
2000	2,179		47.2%
2010	2,420		11.1%
2020	2,636		8.9%
U.S. Decennial Census

=== 2020 census ===
As of the 2020 census, Palmer Lake had a population of 2,636. The median age was 44.4 years. 20.0% of residents were under the age of 18 and 17.0% of residents were 65 years of age or older. For every 100 females there were 103.7 males, and for every 100 females age 18 and over there were 99.6 males age 18 and over.

20.6% of residents lived in urban areas, while 79.4% lived in rural areas.

There were 1,072 households in Palmer Lake, of which 29.1% had children under the age of 18 living in them. Of all households, 54.9% were married-couple households, 17.5% were households with a male householder and no spouse or partner present, and 21.3% were households with a female householder and no spouse or partner present. About 24.2% of all households were made up of individuals and 8.4% had someone living alone who was 65 years of age or older.

There were 1,157 housing units, of which 7.3% were vacant. The homeowner vacancy rate was 0.2% and the rental vacancy rate was 4.3%.

Racial composition as of the 2020 census
Race	Number	Percent
White	2,270	86.1%
Black or African American	18	0.7%
American Indian and Alaska Native	17	0.6%
Asian	26	1.0%
Native Hawaiian and Other Pacific Islander	0	0.0%
Some other race	102	3.9%
Two or more races	203	7.7%
Hispanic or Latino (of any race)	241	9.1%

== Recreation ==
In the late 1890s, with the rising popularity of bicycling, Denver area cycling clubs promoted the creation of paths connecting urban areas with rural areas. In 1897, building on the 11-mile Denver-Littleton Cycle Path, created by the Denver Cycle Path Association, co-founded and headed by Governor Alva Adams and others, a new group raised funds and acquired rights-of-way for an extension to Palmer Lake, a 50-mile route. Some cyclists rode the 100-mile round trip, but many cyclists preferred to take their bikes on the train to Palmer Lake, a 2000' vertical gain, and ride mostly downhill to Denver.

Palmer Lake is adjacent to the 15-mile (24 km) Santa Fe Regional Trail, which runs south through Monument to the southern boundary of the Air Force Academy and follows part of the old Atchison, Topeka and Santa Fe Railway. One of the longest continuous trails in El Paso County, the graveled route supports popular activities, such as biking, hiking and horseback riding, year-round. In winter, cross-country skiers and snowshoers can also enjoy the pathway.

The fishing in Palmer Lake is decent when stocked. A solid winter freeze provides the only opportunity to get out onto the lake itself. There is a Winterfest in late winter each year, which features a supervised skating rink out on the pond. There is also a fishing derby each summer, sponsored by the chamber of commerce.

The two reservoirs behind Palmer Lake are accessible by a trail used by hikers, bicyclists, snowshoers and fishermen. The lower reservoir is fenced off from the public, but the upper reservoir has an open shoreline. The mountains behind the town have a matrix of trails connecting visitors and residents to canyons and ridges. Most trails are accessible to hikers, mountain bikers, and horseback riders. Visitors are advised to bring a map or a local guide when exploring the trails and should be aware of wildlife alerts and National Forest rules.

== Palmer Lake Restoration Project ==
The Palmer Lake Restoration Project, Inc. – a Colorado non-profit 501(c)(3) corporation (a/k/a Awake the Lake and Awake Palmer Lake) – was formed by concerned local residents back in 1995 to try and work towards the restoration of the Lake and surrounding parks, which due to drought and budget issues had fallen into disrepair. Some progress was made, and the committee was inactive for a number of years until the prolonged drought cycle from 2002 through 2013, combined with State restrictions on what water could legally be artificially added to the lake, resulted in a completely dry lake bed in 2013. At that point, Awake the Lake was re-established (both legally and on the ground). Awake the Lake volunteers worked with Town staff and the Town's own water attorneys, who legally changed certain water rights owned by the Town to create a viable source of supplemental fill to what is otherwise a natural body of water. The Town, however, lacked the funding, staff and know-how to push these issues, and as it is important that the Town of Palmer Lake actually have a namesake lake, Awake the Lake began in earnest its grassroots fundraising efforts, as well as a study of the Lake.

Awake the Lake embarked on geotechnical, geologic, hydrogeologic and engineering studies to try and better understand what the natural means of fill of the Lake are, and how similar dry-ups might be prevented during future droughts; Palmer Lake does not currently have any source of surface inflow, nor any outlets, being a glacially formed lake not located on the channels of nearby Monument Creek, nor Plum Creek to the north. Awake the Lake simultaneously took advantage of the Lake being completely empty to remove non-native soils and silts that had built up in the bottom of the Lake over time, making it very shallow, and very sensitive to drought - the Lake simply held a lot less water than historically, making drought impacts that much worse. As part of those studies conducted by volunteer professionals, including cooperative efforts with the University of Colorado at Colorado Springs' geology department, Awake the Lake learned that the lake does not fill from the “bottom up”—the Lake is not on top of a spring, but rather fills from shallow spring water inflows primarily on the western edges of the Lake. Awake the Lake also learned that the Railroads had, decades or perhaps a century ago, enlarged the Lake to the south for purposes of storing additional water for provision to steam engines, but also for creating a shallow area in the Lake where ice could be harvested during winter months. In order to ensure the Lake's legal status as viewed by the State remain as a “natural lake”, Awake Palmer Lake utilized the spoils obtained from removal of non-native soils and sediments as a means to fill the often-sedgey and shallow south end of the Lake and restore the Lake to its natural footprint.

In 2015, upon completion of Awake the Lake's, the drought broke in earnest while the Town simultaneously completed their work in water court to change a senior water right to municipal uses that included supplemental fill of Palmer Lake, and Palmer Lake refilled. 2015 saw the wettest May in over 70 years, and the rains and spring activity naturally filled the lake by nearly 8 feet on the north end. On June 24, 2015, Palmer Lake began supplementing Lake levels with the Town of Palmer Lake's old industrial water rights, now changed, and the Town can now supplement the natural fill of the Lake with up to 8.4 acre feet per month, and up to 67 acre feet per year. Drinking and household water needs continue to have top priority over recreational and aesthetic uses. The Division of Wildlife began again stocking Palmer Lake with fish in the fall of 2015. Awake the Lake continues to study the Lake. including monthly data collection from a volunteer of monitoring wells constructed around the perimeter of the Lake, precipitation data, and Town water contributions, to try and better understand how the groundwater levels surrounding the lake are seasonally and drought affected, and how such fluctuations affect Lake levels. Awake the Lake continues to explore how the lone historical surface water inflow to the Lake at the northwest corner, which 30 years ago was blocked by the Railroad in their efforts to diminish flooding of their tracks, might also be restored.

With the emergent Lake issues seemingly resolved, Awake the Lake turned its efforts towards improvements of parks and amenities surrounding the Lake, obtaining on the Town's behalf a $350,000 matching grant from Great Outdoors Colorado for improvement of the “Rockin the Rails” parks, including improvements to parking facilities along Highway 105, and the centerpiece of the project: a pedestrian bridge across the railroad tracks connecting Town-proper to the Lake and its parks. The Rockin' the Rails park includes a disc-golf course, and where ultimately will include multi-use playing/ball fields for local youth.

Due to an error by a consultant to the Palmer Lake Restoration Project which made it appear as though the committee had not filed its tax returns for 3 consecutive years, in 2017 the IRS placed the committee on its “501(c)(3) status revoked” list, though tax returns had actually been timely filed, simply with an error as to the applicable Tax ID number. Awake Palmer Lake/Palmer Lake Restoration Project was advised by the IRS by letter dated October 31, 2019, that its 501(c)(3) stats had been officially restored, with such restoration retroactive to the 2017 revocation date. Awake Palmer Lake has been, is and remains a 501(c)(3) entity and all donations to the Palmer Lake Restoration Project/Awake Palmer Lake, both prior and future, remain fully tax deductible.

The volunteers with Awake Palmer Lake continue efforts to raise money through donations and event fees for the betterment of Palmer Lake and the parks and amenities which surround it, including the Rockin' the Rails Park. Events include progressive dinners through the Palmer Lake Restaurant Group, dinner dances/concerts, the annual Palmer Lake .5K - the "Race for the Rest of Us", and annual Try-Athalon, and other events.

=== Rockin' the Rails Park ===
On December 9, 2014, the public received notice that the Awake Palmer Lake committee had received a GOCO grant in the amount of $349,893 to be used for improvements around the Lake. The GOCO money is to be applied to what's being called the "Rockin' the Rails" Palmer Lake Railroad Park including a 90-foot overpass over the railway tracks, a disc golf course expansion, landscaped open space and restroom facilities on the park's west side. The bridge will consist of a flatbed railroad car raised 25 feet above the tracks with a staircase for pedestrians and a ramp on either side for bicyclists, wheelchairs and strollers. The park's overall themed will play up the town's history as a refueling stop for steam engines to be topped off with water between Colorado Springs and Denver. Both Union Pacific and Burlington Northern Santa Fe Railroads have approved the engineering plan for the bridge, and after several months of dirt work and retaining wall construction, actual work on the bridge span began in October 2019, with an anticipated completion date of no later than December 31, 2019.

== Palmer Lake Star ==
In 1935, B.E. Jack and Bert Sloan proposed the construction of a large Star of Bethlehem on the side of Sundance Mountain in Palmer Lake. The five-pointed star, measuring 457 feet (139 m) across and consisting of 91, 40-watt non-glare bulbs, is lit for the month of December and for other special occasions. Construction on the project was a community effort. The property on Sundance Mountain where the star was constructed was owned by Art and Reba Bradley, who donated the property to Palmer Lake in 1966. When Mrs. Bradley died in 1979, her estate provided funds to the Palmer Lake Fire Department for the maintenance of the star. In 1976, the star was completely rebuilt with new cable and steel pole in concrete as part of an American Revolutionary bicentennial project.

In February 2013, The Star of Palmer Lake was designated as a Colorado Historic site by History Colorado.

== History ==
The earliest known area inhabitants were Native American tribes - the Mountain Ute, Arapahoe, Kiowa, and Cheyenne. The earliest recorded non-Native activity in the area was the Army's Major Stephen Long Expedition of 1820, which discovered the Colorado State Flower, the white and lavender columbine, somewhere between Monument and Palmer Lake. Many homesteaded ranches and farms straddled the El Paso-Douglas County line as early as the 1860s. David McShane is credited with being one of the first homesteaders, 1865, in the Town of Monument. Henry Limbach and his family were also early arrivals and had much to do with planning and developing of Monument which prospered as the commercial hub for the area on arrival of the railroad.

=== Critical role and a refuge ===
General William J. Palmer, an abolitionist and Quaker, came west after the Civil War to found the city of Colorado Springs and start the Denver & Rio Grande Railroad, a 3 ft (0.91 m) narrow-gauge line, in 1871. He purchased the land known as the Monument Farms & Lake Property. Palmer Lake was critical to the railroad because the steam trains chugged up to the Palmer Divide summit and had to fill up with water from the lake to head down the Divide. The lake was the only natural water supply available in the area. Passenger trains stopped in town for 10 minutes to take on water, or for a fee of $1.00 roundtrip from Denver, passengers could take the train to Palmer Lake for a day of picnicking, fishing, and boating or hiking.

Dr. William Finley Thompson purchased land and plotted the town of Palmer Lake in 1882, intending it as a health resort & vacation community. Thompson was an oral surgeon originally from Randolph, Ohio, who practiced in the Midwest and in London. He built the Queen Anne Victorian mansion Estemere in 1887 for his family, but by 1890 was facing bankruptcy and fled from his creditors. Prior to the automobile, Palmer Lake was a popular destination for people from Denver and others wishing escape the heat of city summer temperatures. The Rocky Mountain Chautauqua - a people's vacation university - was popular between 1887 and 1910, hosting programs in music, art, drama, religion, and nature. The Rockland, a 61-room hotel, provided amenities for visitors, including a petting zoo.

=== Beginnings of agriculture and the Air Force Academy ===
Historical industries in the area included fox farms, sawmills, angora rabbit farming, and dry-land potato and grain farming. Laborers also harvested ice from Monument and Palmer Lakes, and this industry continued until 1941. In 1894 there were over 20,000 acres (81 km^{2}) under cultivation, but in 1895 a potato blight infected the soil and potato farming eventually stopped. At that time, Monument was famous for holding an annual "Potato Bake", a fall celebration where a free feast would be held just across the tracks from Front and Second Streets.

The land surrounding Palmer Lake and Monument remained largely ranch and farmland until the Air Force Academy was opened in 1958. Woodmoor, a township south of Palmer Lake and east of Monument, was originally planned to be an area where the staff of the Air Academy and other military retirees could take up residence. The land still kept to its ranching heritage until Colorado Springs growth spawned housing developments starting about the mid-1980s. Most growth along this part of the I-25 corridor has occurred since 1990.

The area has a remarkable history including events associated with the "wild west." Raids, scalpings and saloon shootings are part of this history. There were several forts in the area where settlers or travelers could take refuge until trouble passed. One of these is the "McShane Fort" located just off Highway 105, close to the railroad overpass bordering Monument and Palmer Lake. Law enforcement apprehended and executed murderers in the Palmer Lake/Monument area. The area was also home to five gold mines, although gold was never found. The area has an extensive historical heritage.

== Transportation ==
Palmer Lake is served by Colorado State Highway 105. It runs directly through the town.

== Education ==
It is in the Lewis-Palmer School District 38.

== See also ==
- Palmer Divide
- Rampart Range
