= Gleneagle, Colorado =

Census-designated place in El Paso County, CO, USA

- Census-designated place
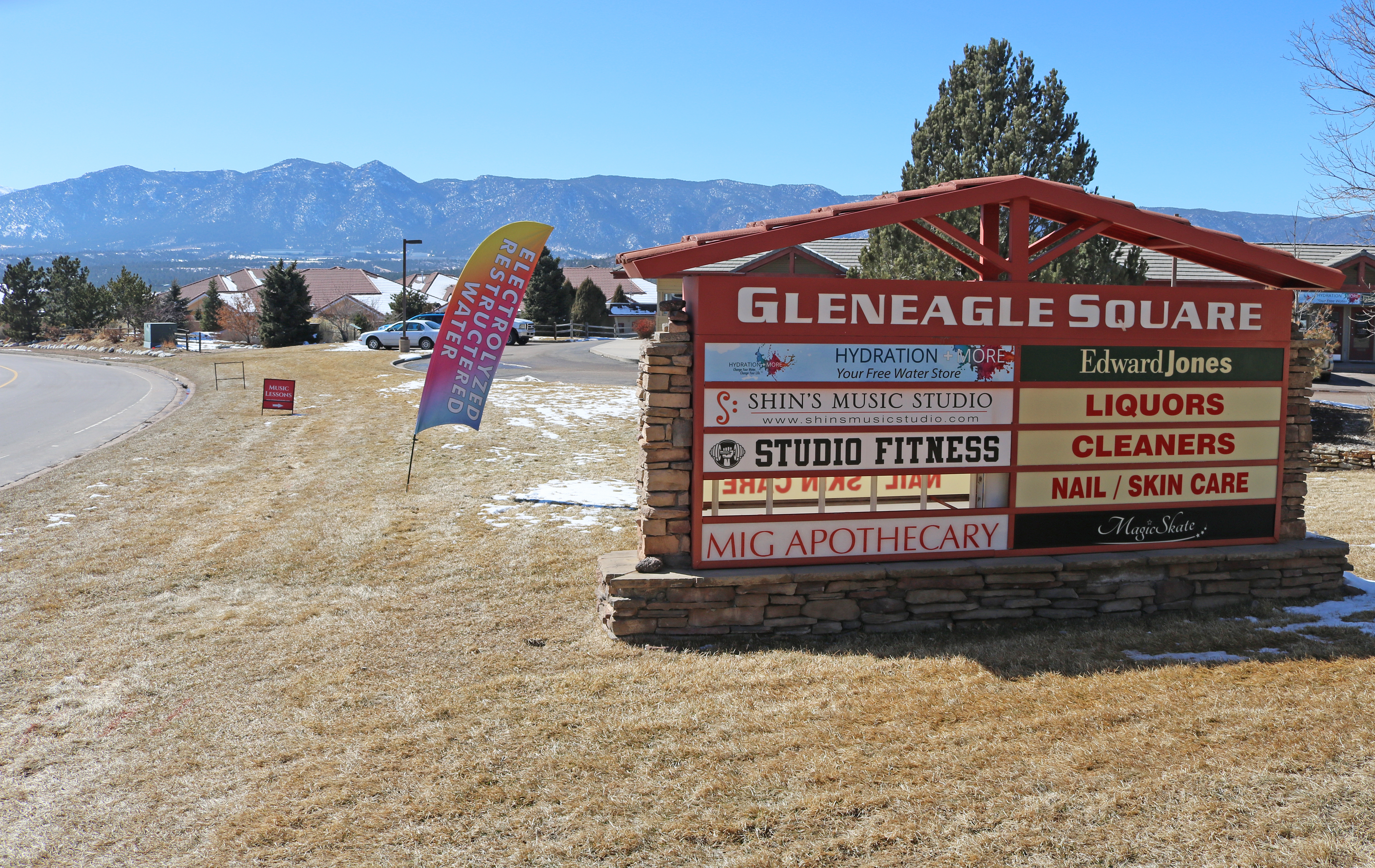
- The Gleneagle Square shopping center in Gleneagle, looking across at the Rampart Range

- Location of the Gleneagle CDP in El Paso County, Colorado
- Coordinates: 39°02′43″N 104°49′44″W
- Country: United States
- State: Colorado
- County: El Paso County

Government
  - Type: unincorporated community

Area
  - Total: 2.343 sq mi (6.069 km^{2})
  - Land: 2.338 sq mi (6.056 km^{2})
  - Water: 0.0050 sq mi (0.013 km^{2})
- Elevation: 6,870 ft (2,090 m)

Population (2020)
  - Total: 6,649
  - Density: 2,844/sq mi (1,098/km^{2})
- Time zone: UTC-7 (MST)
  - Summer (DST): UTC-6 (MDT)
- ZIP Code: Colorado Springs 80921
- Area code: 719
- GNIS feature ID: 2408300

Gleneagle is an unincorporated community and a census-designated place (CDP) located in and governed by El Paso County, Colorado, United States. The CDP is a part of the Colorado Springs, CO Metropolitan Statistical Area. The population of the Gleneagle CDP was 6,649 at the United States Census 2020. The Colorado Springs post office (Zip Code 80921) serves the area.

== Geography ==
The Gleneagle CDP has an area of 1,500 acres (6.069 km^{2}), including 3.2 acres (0.013 km^{2}) of water.

== Demographics ==
The United States Census Bureau initially defined the Gleneagle CDP for the 1990 United States census.

Gleneagle CDP, Colorado
Year	Pop.	±%
1990	1,661	—
2000	4,246	+155.6%
2010	6,611	+55.7%
2020	6,649	+0.6%
Source: United States Census Bureau

=== 2020 census ===
As of the 2020 census, Gleneagle had a population of 6,649. The median age was 43.7 years. 25.2% of residents were under the age of 18 and 19.5% of residents were 65 years of age or older. For every 100 females there were 93.7 males, and for every 100 females age 18 and over there were 91.5 males age 18 and over.

98.5% of residents lived in urban areas, while 1.5% lived in rural areas.

There were 2,386 households in Gleneagle, of which 34.3% had children under the age of 18 living in them. Of all households, 70.0% were married-couple households, 11.5% were households with a male householder and no spouse or partner present, and 15.8% were households with a female householder and no spouse or partner present. About 17.2% of all households were made up of individuals and 9.2% had someone living alone who was 65 years of age or older.

There were 2,486 housing units, of which 4.0% were vacant. The homeowner vacancy rate was 0.5% and the rental vacancy rate was 7.2%.

Racial composition as of the 2020 census
Race	Number	Percent
White	5,447	81.9%
Black or African American	158	2.4%
American Indian and Alaska Native	30	0.5%
Asian	262	3.9%
Native Hawaiian and Other Pacific Islander	6	0.1%
Some other race	105	1.6%
Two or more races	641	9.6%
Hispanic or Latino (of any race)	538	8.1%

== Politics ==
In the Colorado General Assembly Gleneagle is located in the 4th Senate District, represented by Republican Jim Smallwood, and in the 20th House District, represented by Republican Terri Carver. Federally, Gleneagle is located in Colorado's 5th congressional district and is represented by Republican Doug Lamborn.

== Media ==
Gleneagle is served by Colorado Springs radio and television stations.

=== Newspapers ===
- The Gazette (Colorado Springs)
- The Tri-Lakes Tribune

== Education ==
It is in the Academy School District 20.

== See also ==
- Colorado Springs, CO Metropolitan Statistical Area
