= Monument, Colorado =

Town in Colorado, United States

- Home rule town
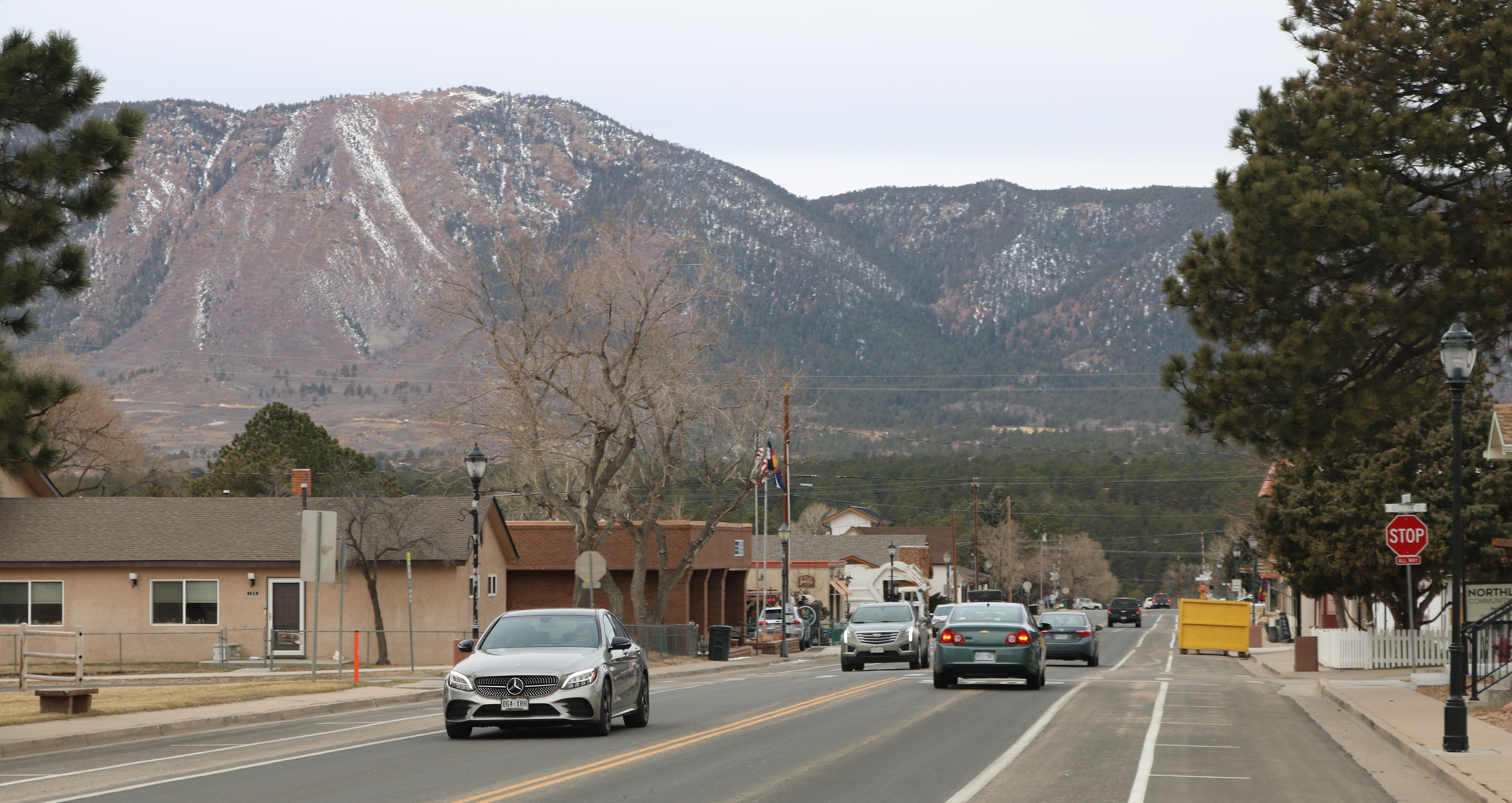
- Looking west along 2nd Street
- Motto(s): "Proud of our past, confident of our future"
- Location of Monument in El Paso County, Colorado.
- Coordinates: 39°04′52″N 104°51′45″W
- Country: United States
- State: Colorado
- County: El Paso
- Incorporated (town): June 2, 1879

Government
  - Type: Home rule town
  - Mayor: Mitch LaKind

Area
  - Total: 6.91 sq mi (17.90 km^{2})
  - Land: 6.86 sq mi (17.78 km^{2})
  - Water: 0.050 sq mi (0.13 km^{2})
- Elevation: 6,982 ft (2,128 m)

Population (2020)
  - Total: 10,399
  - Density: 1,179.8/sq mi (455.53/km^{2})
- Time zone: UTC-7 (MST)
  - Summer (DST): UTC-6 (MDT)
- ZIP code: 80132
- Area code: 719
- GNIS feature ID: 2413009
- FIPS code: 08-51800
- Website: townofmonument.org

Monument is a home rule town situated at the base of the Rampart Range in El Paso County, Colorado, United States. Monument is one of the three communities that make up the Tri-Lakes area, along with Palmer Lake and Woodmoor. Monument is bordered by Pike National Forest on the west, Colorado Springs and the United States Air Force Academy to the south, Bald Mountain, True Mountain, and Spruce Mountain to the north, and Black Forest and rolling plains to the east. Monument was first settled as a stop along the Rio Grande Railroad in 1872, and the area was incorporated as a town called Henry's Station in 1879, but the name was later changed to Monument. The town population was 10,399 at the 2020 United States census, a 88% increase from a population of 5,530 in 2010 and a 528% increase from a population of 1,971 in 2000.

== History ==
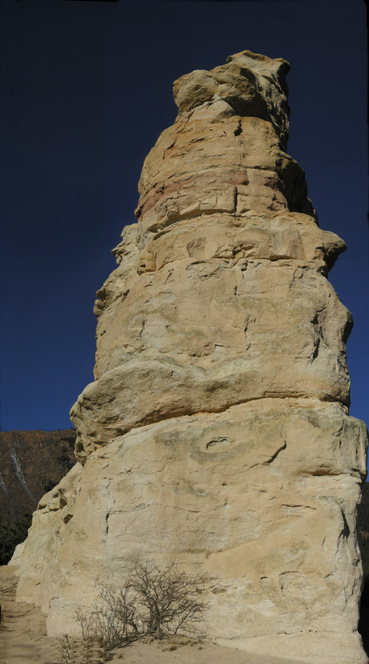
Monument Rock, the formation from which the town derives its name

Monument's first homesteaders arrived in 1865 to mark out the town's preliminary shape, but settlement increased when Monument became a stop along the Rio Grande Railroad in 1872. The area was incorporated as a town called Henry's Station, after prominent settler Henry Limbach, on June 2, 1879, and the first town meeting was held July 3, 1879. However, three years later the name was changed to Monument after Monument Creek and Monument Rock in the west. The first records of the town can be found in various volumes in the El Paso County Courthouse dating back to 1872. With the help of the railroad, which brought in necessities, people started small businesses and started to create a town.

== Geography ==
Monument is located north of Colorado Springs and the United States Air Force Academy, and east of the Rampart Range, which is the eastern front range of the Rocky Mountains. Monument Creek, a gentle mountain stream beginning in the Rampart Range, eventually tumbles down through Palmer Lake and the west side of Monument to become one of the main waterways flowing south through Colorado Springs. The town of Monument is situated on the southern slope of Palmer Divide, a significant geographical feature which separates the Arkansas and South Platte basins. According to the United States Census Bureau, Monument has a total area of 4.6 square miles (12 km^{2}), all of it land.

== Demographics ==
Historical population
Census	Pop.	Note	%±
1880	125		—
1890	177		41.6%
1900	156		−11.9%
1910	149		−4.5%
1920	192		28.9%
1930	192		0.0%
1940	175		−8.9%
1950	126		−28.0%
1960	204		61.9%
1970	393		92.6%
1980	690		75.6%
1990	1,020		47.8%
2000	1,971		93.2%
2010	5,530		180.6%
2020	10,399		88.0%
U.S. Decennial Census

=== 2020 census ===
As of the 2020 census, Monument had a population of 10,399. The median age was 39.0 years. 28.5% of residents were under the age of 18 and 11.5% of residents were 65 years of age or older. For every 100 females there were 99.2 males, and for every 100 females age 18 and over there were 97.4 males age 18 and over.

99.6% of residents lived in urban areas, while 0.4% lived in rural areas.

There were 3,580 households in Monument, of which 43.0% had children under the age of 18 living in them. Of all households, 68.5% were married-couple households, 12.1% were households with a male householder and no spouse or partner present, and 15.6% were households with a female householder and no spouse or partner present. About 15.4% of all households were made up of individuals and 7.0% had someone living alone who was 65 years of age or older.

There were 3,746 housing units, of which 4.4% were vacant. The homeowner vacancy rate was 0.9% and the rental vacancy rate was 6.2%.

Racial composition as of the 2020 census
Race	Number	Percent
White	8,610	82.8%
Black or African American	158	1.5%
American Indian and Alaska Native	57	0.5%
Asian	251	2.4%
Native Hawaiian and Other Pacific Islander	1	0.0%
Some other race	263	2.5%
Two or more races	1,059	10.2%
Hispanic or Latino (of any race)	941	9.0%

=== 2000 census ===
There were 725 households, out of which 45.4% had children under the age of 18 living with them, 59.2% were married couples living together, 11.9% had a female householder with no husband present, and 24.1% were non-families. 19.0% of all households were made up of individuals, and 3.6% had someone living alone who was 65 years of age or older. The average household size was 2.72 and the average family size was 3.12.

In the town, the population was spread out, with 32.9% under the age of 18, 6.8% from 18 to 24, 38.3% from 25 to 44, 17.7% from 45 to 64, and 4.3% who were 65 years of age or older. The median age was 31 years. For every 100 females, there were 97.7 males. For every 100 females age 18 and over, there were 95.0 males.

The median income for a household in the town was $50,000, and the median income for a family was $54,211. Males had a median income of $41,071 versus $27,583 for females. The per capita income for the town was $19,878. About 5.4% of families and 5.0% of the population were below the poverty line, including 5.4% of those under age 18 and 7.4% of those age 65 or over.

== Government ==
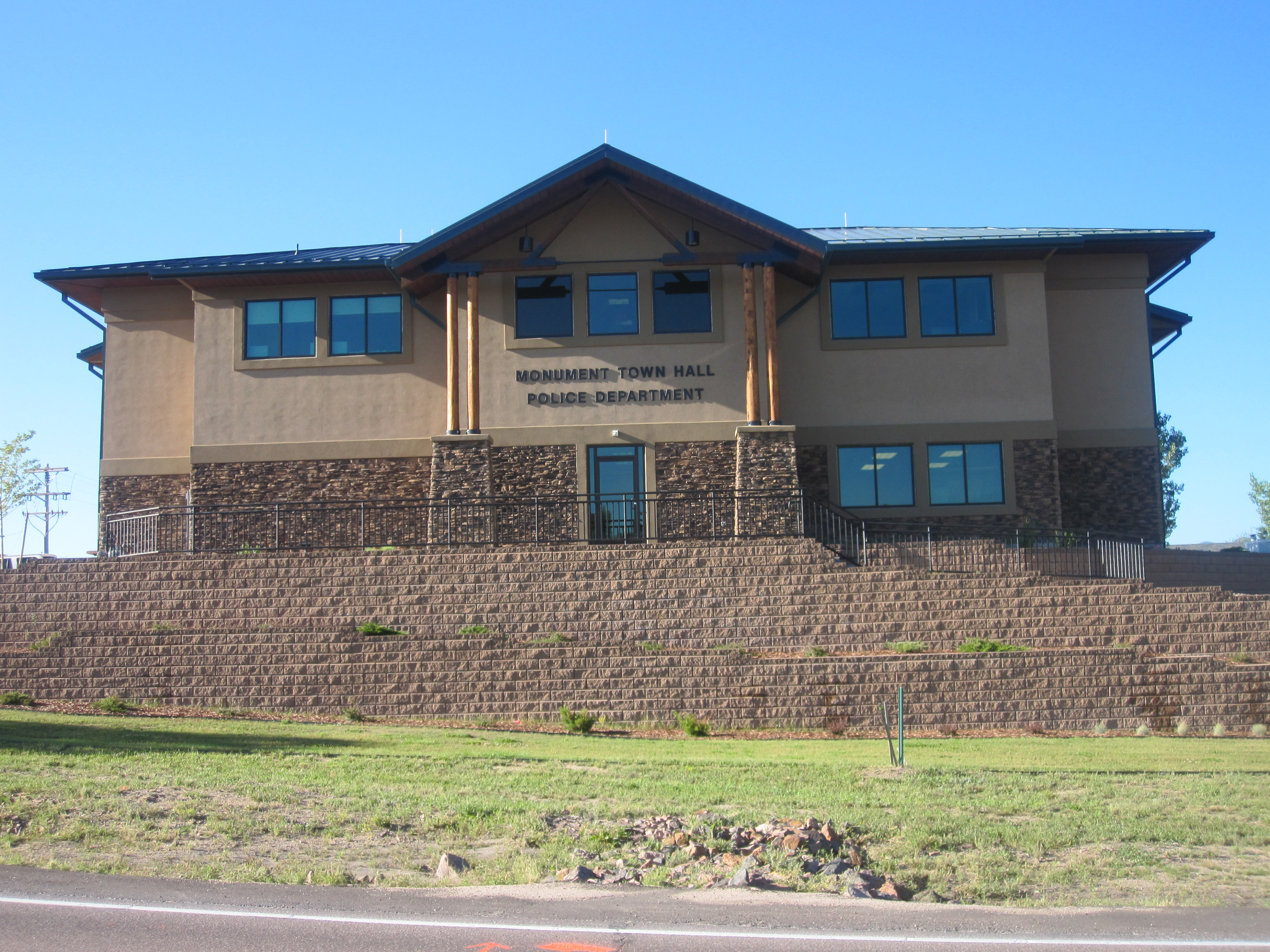
Monument town hall and police department

Monument is a home rule town and is under a home rule charter. This means that the governmental policy is established by the Town Council. There are seven council members, including the mayor. The mayor is considered part of the Town Council, and has the same power as the other council members. Council members are elected for overlapping 4-year terms, and the mayor is elected for four years as well. A vacancy in office will be filled by council appointment or by voters at a regular or special election. There is a set term limit of two consecutive terms for the mayor and council members. All regular and special meetings must be open to the public, and people must be given the opportunity to be heard.

== Education ==
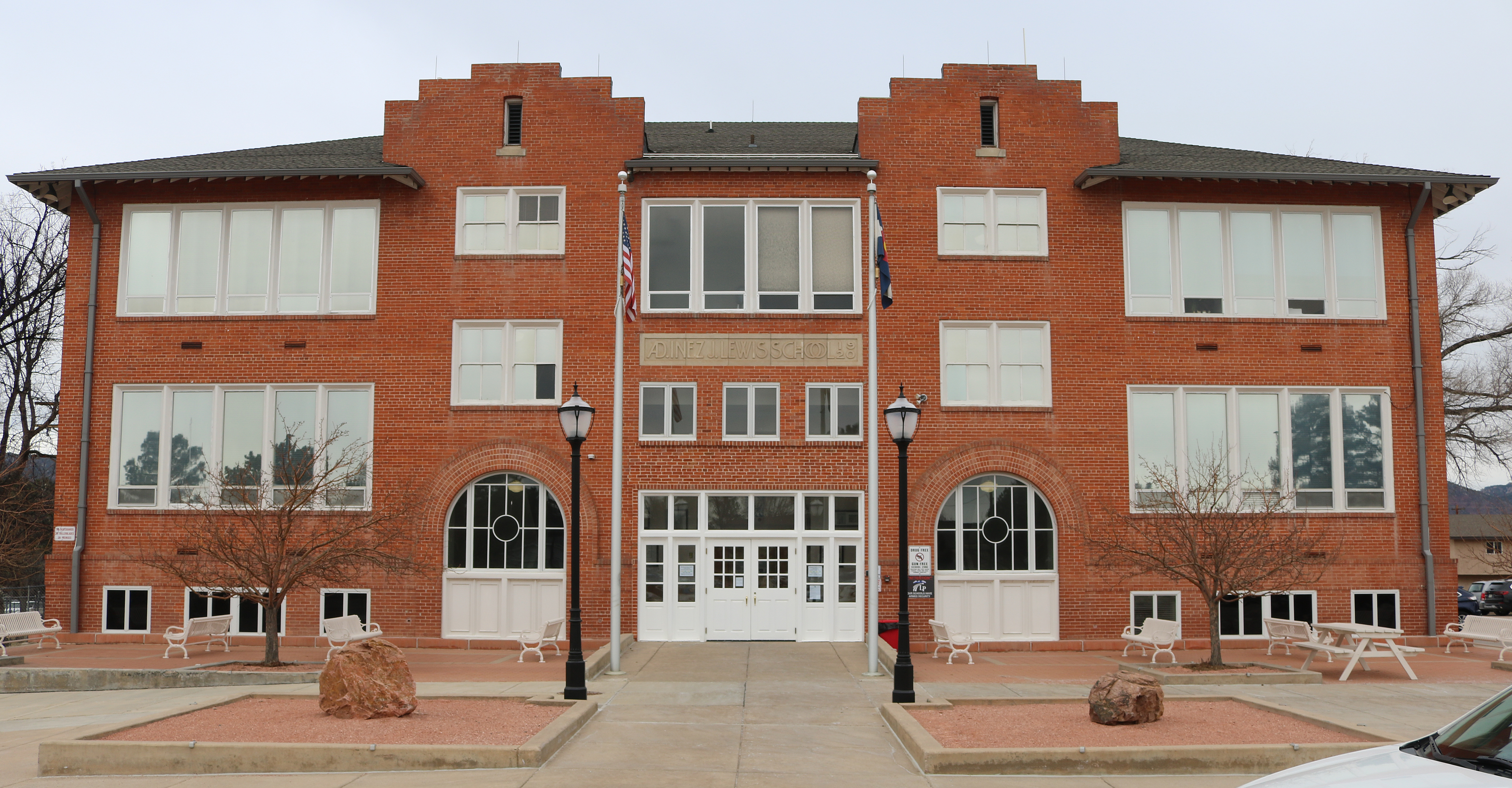
The former Inez Johnson Lewis School, this building now serves as the Lewis-Palmer School District 38 administration building.

By Colorado law, Monument is a school-choice community. Because of this, there are opportunities for public schools, private schools, charter schools, and home schooling groups.

The public school system for almost all of the CDP is Lewis-Palmer School District 38. Lewis-Palmer District ACT scores (at 23) are about 20% higher than the average state scores (at 19) in the two high schools, Palmer Ridge and Lewis-Palmer. The Lewis-Palmer district as a whole performs 15-20% better on CSAP tests than the Colorado state average. There are five public elementary schools in District 38: Lewis-Palmer Elementary, Palmer Lake Elementary, Kilmer, Prairie Winds Elementary, and Bear Creek Elementary. There is one public middle school serving all of District 38: Lewis-Palmer Middle School.

The CDP extends into the Academy School District 20. Monument Academy is the only charter school and serves grades K through 12.

== Organizations ==
The residents of Monument support and participate in many different organizations. It is home to various types of churches, such as Presbyterian, Catholic, Lutheran, Mennonite, Methodist, and nondenominational. Monument has several organizations that are unique to the community, and also several nationwide organizations. Some notable organizations in Monument include:

- The Pikes Peak Library District which serves Monument, Colorado Springs, and the surrounding areas.
- Several Boy Scout Troops including Boy Scout Troop 514 which is in possession of the Challenger flag, the USA flag that was aboard the final ill-fated mission of the Challenger Space Shuttle.
- A chapter of Kiwanis International.
- Friends of Monument Preserve, a volunteer organization that works in partnership with the US Forest Service to protect and maintain historical and recreational lands in and around Monument.
- Tri-Lakes Cares, a volunteer-supported organization that primarily serves economically disadvantaged individuals in the Tri-Lakes area.

== Transportation ==
The greater Monument area is bisected north–south by interstate 25 and can be directly accessed via exits 158 and 161. Interstate 25 serves as the primary land connection between Colorado's two largest population centers (Denver and Colorado Springs), and in its transit through Monument passes over the top of Monument Hill, a geological ridge protrusion from the Front Range which frequently experiences hazardous road conditions, particularly in the winter months; automobile accidents and traffic jams are common in this stretch of interstate. State Highway 105 also runs east/west through Monument with the western terminus curving north to Sedalia and the eastern terminus dead-ending in to State Highway 83, which runs longitudinally through Black Forest, with the northern terminus leading to Aurora and the southern terminus turning into Interquest Parkway on the north end of Colorado Springs.

A section of railway (formerly, the Colorado and Southern Railway, now owned by BNSF) also runs parallel to interstate 25 through Monument, and is used primarily for coal transport. Passenger service used to be available along the railway southbound to Pueblo and northbound to Denver with connecting destinations, but was eventually discontinued by all carriers by 1971; as of 2024, passenger rail service remains unavailable in Monument. There is widespread support for re-establishing a passenger rail connection spanning Colorado's Front Range Urban Corridor via the Front Range Passenger Rail Project. In 2024, the project was granted $500,000 by the USDOT to research and devise a detailed active service plan in hopes of securing further funding.

The only form of public transportation that exists in Monument is a park and ride bus stop for the Bustang, Colorado's inter-regional express bus service. Rideshare services like Lyft and Uber are becoming more accessible in Monument as a benefit of the town's close proximity to Colorado Springs. As of 2024, Lyft and Uber will service most of Monument and much of the Tri-Lakes area as part of their Colorado Springs services.

== Climate ==
Monument experiences a hemiboreal continental climate (Köppen Dfb) with warm, relatively rainy summers and cold, snowy winters. The semi-arid climate keeps the dew point very low in Monument year-round which causes the air to feel quite dry. Monument is part of the Front Range urban corridor and lies on the southern slope of Monument Hill. The town is situated near the western terminus of the Palmer Divide, a low-grade ridge that extends eastward from the Front Range and has a significant impact on Monument's climate. With Monument Hill reaching 7,352 feet above sea level, Monument is one of the highest communities in the Front Range urban corridor. The combination of high elevation, unique geography, semi-arid climate, and freezing cold winter months results in the town of Monument receiving considerably more snow each year than its neighboring municipalities. Colorado Springs (20 miles to the South) and Castle Rock (22 miles to the North) receive an average of 33 inches and 56 inches of annual snow, respectively, whereas the town of Monument receives an average of 111 inches of snow per year.

Climate data for Monument, Colorado. (data from 1988-2003)
Month	Jan	Feb	Mar	Apr	May	Jun	Jul	Aug	Sep	Oct	Nov	Dec	Year
Record high °F (°C)	70 (21)	66 (19)	73 (23)	86 (30)	93 (34)	93 (34)	98 (37)	96 (36)	89 (32)	79 (26)	72 (22)	65 (18)	98 (37)
Mean daily maximum °F (°C)	41.2 (5.1)	42.6 (5.9)	49.8 (9.9)	56.3 (13.5)	66.0 (18.9)	77.5 (25.3)	81.5 (27.5)	79.7 (26.5)	70.7 (21.5)	60.7 (15.9)	49.5 (9.7)	40.4 (4.7)	59.7 (15.4)
Mean daily minimum °F (°C)	15.8 (−9.0)	17.0 (−8.3)	22.9 (−5.1)	29.1 (−1.6)	38.0 (3.3)	47.1 (8.4)	52.4 (11.3)	51.4 (10.8)	43.8 (6.6)	32.8 (0.4)	22.4 (−5.3)	15.6 (−9.1)	32.4 (0.2)
Record low °F (°C)	−16 (−27)	−26 (−32)	−9 (−23)	0 (−18)	21 (−6)	30 (−1)	38 (3)	35 (2)	20 (−7)	−4 (−20)	−9 (−23)	−27 (−33)	−27 (−33)
Average precipitation inches (mm)	0.83 (21)	0.56 (14)	2.30 (58)	3.09 (78)	2.52 (64)	2.51 (64)	2.79 (71)	3.03 (77)	1.62 (41)	1.34 (34)	1.41 (36)	0.81 (21)	22.81 (579)
Average snowfall inches (cm)	13.5 (34)	10.0 (25)	22.3 (57)	22.4 (57)	3.1 (7.9)	0.1 (0.25)	0 (0)	0 (0)	1.4 (3.6)	9.1 (23)	15.9 (40)	12.8 (33)	110.6 (280.75)
Source: The Western Regional Climate Center

== Notable people ==
- Kevin J. Anderson, bestselling science fiction author
- Jennifer Barringer, professional runner and Olympian
- Bobby Burling, professional MLS player, attended Lewis-Palmer High School
- Adrian Carrio, racing driver
- Chumped, members of the band: Anika Pyle, Drew Johnson, Dan Frelly
- Tom Clements, former director of the Colorado Department of Corrections, assassinated
- Pat Garrity, former NBA player
- Wayne Laugesen, journalist
- Frances McConnell-Mills, toxicologist
- Jennifer Sipes, actress and model, born in Monument, attended Lewis-Palmer Elementary School
- Paige Spiranac, professional golfer and model
- Matthew Ward, Christian musician and former member of 2nd Chapter of Acts

== In popular culture ==
Monument is the setting of season 3, episode 12 ("Jus in Bello") of the fictional American television series, Supernatural.

== See also ==
- Front Range Urban Corridor
- South Central Colorado Urban Area
