= Black Forest, Colorado =

Census-designated place in Colorado, US

- Census-designated place
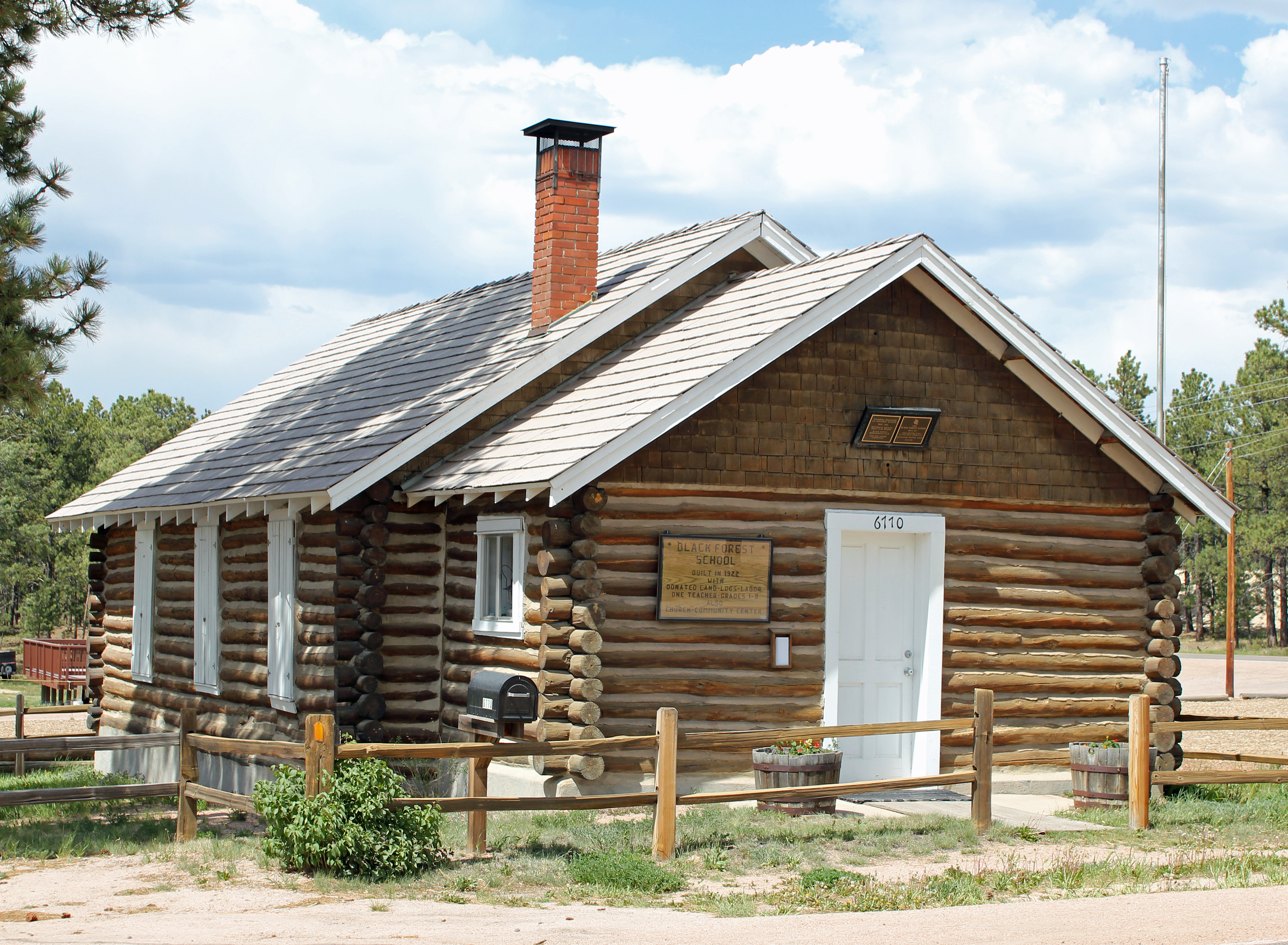
- The Black Forest School

- Location of the Black Forest CDP in El Paso County, Colorado
- Coordinates: 39°04′46″N 104°40′32″W
- Country: United States
- State: Colorado
- County: El Paso

Government
  - Type: Unincorporated community
  - Body: El Paso County

Area
  - Total: 100.698 sq mi (260.807 km^{2})
  - Land: 100.640 sq mi (260.657 km^{2})
  - Water: 0.058 sq mi (0.150 km^{2})
- Elevation: 7,369 ft (2,246 m)

Population (2020)
  - Total: 15,097
  - Density: 150.01/sq mi (57.919/km^{2})
- Time zone: UTC−07:00 (MST)
  - Summer (DST): UTC−06:00 (MDT)
- ZIP Code: Colorado Springs 80908 and Elbert 80106
- Area code: 719
- GNIS CDP ID: 2407856
- FIPS code: FIPS 08 06970

Black Forest is an unincorporated community and a census-designated place (CDP) located in El Paso County, Colorado, United States. The CDP is a part of the Colorado Springs, CO Metropolitan Statistical Area. The population of the Black Forest CDP was 15,097 at the United States Census 2020. Both the Colorado Springs post office (Zip Code 80908) and the Elbert post office (Zip Code 80106) serve the area.

The Black Forest is named for a dense stand of Ponderosa Pine in the area. In 2006, residents voted against a proposal to incorporate as a city.

== History ==
The history of the Black Forest area is closely paralleled by that of a larger area traditionally known as the "Pineries". The area originally extended from what is now known as the town of Monument, Colorado, through the present planning area and east along the Platte-Arkansas Divide to a point where the Ponderosa Pines thinned out. Altogether the Pineries encompassed a 1,000 square mile area. Although the origin of the name is not clear, that portion of the Pineries north of Colorado Springs became known as the "Black Forest" by around the turn of the century.

Arrowheads and charcoal pits provide evidence that the planning area was occupied by Native Americans at least 800 years ago. The first known inhabitants were the Ute and Comanche Indians. The dense Ponderosa Pines provided them with protection, fuel, and timber for lodgepoles. These tribes were displaced by the Kiowas around 1800. Almost 40 years later, the Arapahoe and Cheyenne tribes joined forces to drive out the Kiowas and become the last Native Americans to inhabit the area.

When American pioneers began to settle the region in the late 1850s the Black Forest became an important center of activity, primarily as a source of scarce timber. The first of what would be several dozen sawmills was constructed in 1860. General Palmer was the first major landowner of Black Forest when he established the Colorado Pinery Trust in 1870; he purchased 43,000 acres. Lumber and mine props were supplied to build Colorado Springs and Denver. An 1880 article from the Colorado Springs Gazette stated that for years nearly every foot of timber used in Denver was hauled from the Pineries. Logging in the Pineries reached its height in the summer of 1870 when over 700 teamsters and 1,000 lumberjacks and tie hacks were employed, mostly for railway work. More than one billion board feet of lumber were removed to provide ties for the Kansas Pacific, Denver and Rio Grande and New Orleans Railroads.

Although lumbering continued sporadically through the 1950s, farming and ranching had become the dominant activities by the 1880s. A wide variety of crops were raised, including cattle, sheep, alfalfa, wheat, corn, hay and beans. Potatoes, however, were the agricultural product for which the Black Forest area became most renowned. Agricultural productivity was subject to boom and bust cycles with crops often ruined by drought, floods, hail, blizzards, or grasshoppers. The drought and the Depression of the 1930s combined to eliminate most types of agriculture in the planning area. By the 1920s the area was mostly consolidated into large ranches. Some of these remain today.

Several towns and settlements dotted the planning area at one time or another during its history. The largest and most long-lived of these was the Town of Eastonville. Eastonville (actually located just to the east of the planning area) was begun in the early 1880s as a stop on the Colorado and Southern Railway. Its population peaked at about 400 in 1910 and was already in decline when the railroad ceased operations in 1935. Today only a few remnants of the once thriving townsite remain.

In the forest itself, modern subdivision had a fitful start in the 1920s when Dreamland and Brentwood Country Clubs were organized. Although these ventures were not particularly successful, they did represent the beginning of what would become a significant summer home market in the planning area. A boom in year-round subdivisions took place in the late 1950s and early 1960s. The Black Forest, Colorado, post office operated from April 16, 1960, until February 9, 1966, when it became a branch of the Colorado Springs post office. Most of the planning area was zoned for five acre minimum lot sizes in 1965.

Primarily in response to plans for a major transportation corridor through the eastern portion of the planning area, residents and County staff initiated work on a comprehensive land use plan in the early 1970s. The result of this effort was adoption of the Black Forest Preservation Plan in 1974. While this plan recommended rural-residential uses for most of the planning area, it also delineated several large areas for mixed urban uses. The largest of these was in the southeast where the new "city" of Latigo would later be proposed.

While Latigo has not materialized as envisioned, the Colorado Springs metropolitan area itself has expanded rapidly in the direction of the planning area. During the same period, numerous large lot residential subdivisions have been platted and developed in the planning area, allowing it to retain much of its rural character and a good bit of its historic legacy. Although some newer suburban subdivisions have been created within the boundaries of Black Forest such as Flying Horse Ranch, Black Forest still retains a rural image and legacy. Some of this legacy is in the form of remaining historic sites and structures.

While Black Forest is not an incorporated town, it is well known by that name. At first, the name was more informal but became "more official" with the opening of the Black Forest School (now named Edith Wolford Elementary) in 1923.

=== 2013 Black Forest Fire ===
On June 11, 2013, a forest fire started around Highway 83 and Shoup Road, within Black Forest. Nearly 35,500 people within and around Black Forest, Colorado Springs, and Elbert County were evacuated, and a portion of Douglas County was placed on pre-evacuation notice. 15,500 acres burned, 511 buildings were destroyed, and there were two fatalities. Based on number of homes destroyed, it surpassed the Waldo Canyon Fire in the same county the previous year as the most destructive wildfire in Colorado history. It was concurrent with the Royal Gorge Fire in Fremont County, which threatened the Royal Gorge Bridge. Firefighters achieved 100% containment on approximately June 20, 2013.

== Geography ==
The Black Forest CDP has an area of 64,447 acres (260.807 km^{2}), including 37 acres (0.150 km^{2}) of water. A possible highpoint for the Black Forest area is Vollmer Hill at 7704 feet (2348.2 meters) feet based on a traditional USGS Topographic map.

=== Climate ===
Black Forest features a midlatitude semiarid climate (Köppen BSk), with a high diurnal temperature range due to its high elevation and relatively low humidity. Summers are warm, with crisp nights, and influenced by the North American monsoon. Winters are cold with moderate snowfall.

Climate data for Black Forest, CO, 39.0128 N, 104.7005 W at 7,323 ft (2,232 m) amsl (1991–2020 normals)
Month	Jan	Feb	Mar	Apr	May	Jun	Jul	Aug	Sep	Oct	Nov	Dec	Year
Mean daily maximum °F (°C)	40.8 (4.9)	42.1 (5.6)	49.4 (9.7)	55.4 (13.0)	64.7 (18.2)	76.3 (24.6)	81.3 (27.4)	78.8 (26.0)	72.0 (22.2)	60.3 (15.7)	49.0 (9.4)	41.5 (5.3)	59.3 (15.2)
Daily mean °F (°C)	28.1 (−2.2)	29.1 (−1.6)	35.9 (2.2)	41.8 (5.4)	50.7 (10.4)	61.1 (16.2)	66.5 (19.2)	64.6 (18.1)	57.4 (14.1)	46.1 (7.8)	35.7 (2.1)	28.4 (−2.0)	45.4 (7.5)
Mean daily minimum °F (°C)	15.4 (−9.2)	16.1 (−8.8)	22.3 (−5.4)	28.2 (−2.1)	36.6 (2.6)	45.9 (7.7)	51.7 (10.9)	50.4 (10.2)	42.8 (6.0)	31.8 (−0.1)	22.4 (−5.3)	15.3 (−9.3)	31.6 (−0.2)
Average precipitation inches (mm)	.63 (16)	.71 (18)	1.42 (36)	2.57 (65)	2.41 (61)	2.30 (58)	3.19 (81)	3.66 (93)	1.95 (50)	1.10 (28)	.86 (22)	.64 (16)	21.44 (544)
Mean daily sunshine hours	6.7	6.4	8.5	10.2	10.5	11.5	11.3	11.4	10.5	7.4	7.1	6.8	9.0
Source 1: PRISM Climate Group
Source 2: Weather Atlas (sunshine)

== Demographics ==
The United States Census Bureau initially defined the Black Forest CDP for the 1980 United States census.

Black Forest CDP, Colorado
Year	Pop.	±%
1980	3,372	—
1990	8,143	+141.5%
2000	13,247	+62.7%
2010	13,116	−1.0%
2020	15,097	+15.1%
Source: United States Census Bureau

=== 2020 census ===
As of the 2020 census, Black Forest had a population of 15,097. The median age was 49.1 years. 21.6% of residents were under the age of 18 and 19.8% of residents were 65 years of age or older. For every 100 females there were 101.1 males, and for every 100 females age 18 and over there were 98.4 males age 18 and over.

0.0% of residents lived in urban areas, while 100.0% lived in rural areas.

There were 5,300 households in Black Forest, of which 29.8% had children under the age of 18 living in them. Of all households, 77.5% were married-couple households, 9.0% were households with a male householder and no spouse or partner present, and 10.9% were households with a female householder and no spouse or partner present. About 11.9% of all households were made up of individuals and 6.7% had someone living alone who was 65 years of age or older.

There were 5,533 housing units, of which 4.2% were vacant. The homeowner vacancy rate was 0.7% and the rental vacancy rate was 5.9%.

Racial composition as of the 2020 census
Race	Number	Percent
White	12,993	86.1%
Black or African American	172	1.1%
American Indian and Alaska Native	75	0.5%
Asian	244	1.6%
Native Hawaiian and Other Pacific Islander	12	0.1%
Some other race	291	1.9%
Two or more races	1,310	8.7%
Hispanic or Latino (of any race)	1,092	7.2%

== Education ==
The following school districts include portions of the CDP: Academy School District 20, Lewis-Palmer School District 38, School District 49, and Peyton School District 23-JT.

== See also ==
- Colorado Springs, CO Metropolitan Statistical Area
- Front Range Urban Corridor
