= Woodmoor, Colorado =

Unincorporated community in Colorado, US

- Census-designated place
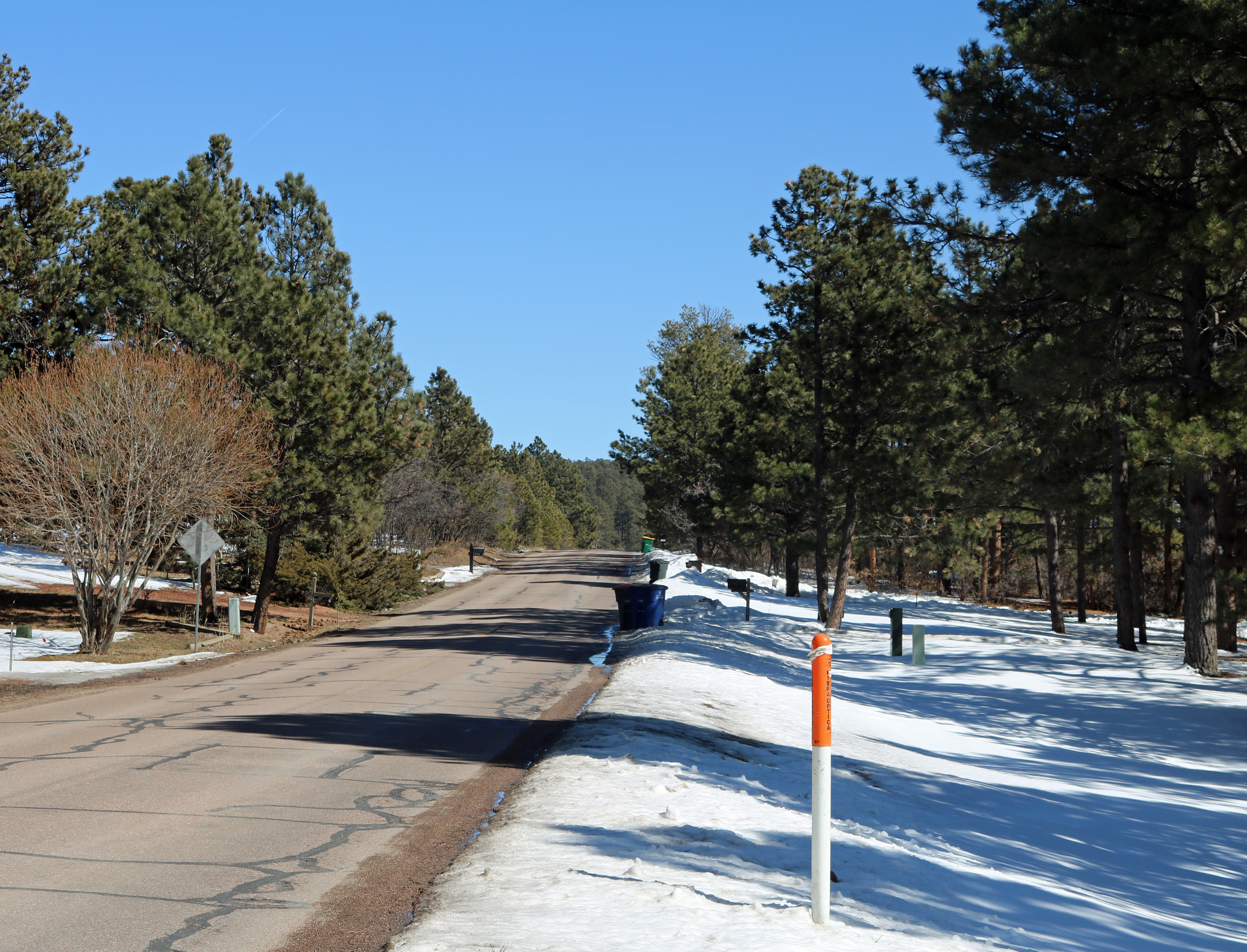
- Woodmoor Drive in Woodmoor.

- Location of the Woodmoor CDP in El Paso County, Colorado
- Coordinates: 39°06′50″N 104°50′47″W
- Country: United States
- State: Colorado
- County: El Paso County

Government
  - Type: unincorporated community

Area
  - Total: 6.093 sq mi (15.781 km^{2})
  - Land: 6.031 sq mi (15.621 km^{2})
  - Water: 0.062 sq mi (0.160 km^{2})
- Elevation: 7,294 ft (2,223 m)

Population (2020)
  - Total: 9,536
  - Density: 1,581/sq mi (610.5/km^{2})
- Time zone: UTC-7 (MST)
  - Summer (DST): UTC-6 (MDT)
- ZIP Code: Monument 80132
- Area code: 719
- GNIS feature ID: 2409624

Woodmoor is an unincorporated community and a census-designated place (CDP) located in and governed by El Paso County, Colorado, United States. The CDP is a part of the Colorado Springs, CO Metropolitan Statistical Area. The population of the Woodmoor CDP was 9,536 at the United States Census 2020. The Monument post office (Zip Code 80132) serves the area.

== Geography ==
The approximate center of Woodmoor is 1.5 miles due east of the center of Monument, Colorado.

The Woodmoor CDP has an area of 3,900 acres (15.781 km^{2}), including 40 acres (0.160 km^{2}) of water.

=== Common Areas ===
The Woodmoor Commons have been somewhat of a mystery since there were no signs designating those areas for common use and no maps available to all Woodmoor Residents which designate the location of the common areas. In 1994, the Woodmoor Improvement Association rounded up volunteer residents to hike the areas, name them, build and install signs to the bigger areas, and prepare the first Guide to the Woodmoor Commons. Additionally, Woodmoor has numerous bridle trails in both North and South Woodmoor.

== Demographics ==
The United States Census Bureau initially defined the Woodmoor CDP for the 1980 United States census.

Woodmoor CDP, Colorado
Year	Pop.	±%
1980	1,490	—
1990	3,858	+158.9%
2000	7,177	+86.0%
2010	8,741	+21.8%
2020	9,536	+9.1%
Source: United States Census Bureau

=== 2020 census ===
As of the 2020 census, Woodmoor had a population of 9,536. The median age was 47.4 years. 22.7% of residents were under the age of 18 and 20.3% of residents were 65 years of age or older. For every 100 females there were 100.4 males, and for every 100 females age 18 and over there were 98.3 males age 18 and over.

99.6% of residents lived in urban areas, while 0.4% lived in rural areas.

There were 3,390 households in Woodmoor, of which 32.7% had children under the age of 18 living in them. Of all households, 76.8% were married-couple households, 8.4% were households with a male householder and no spouse or partner present, and 12.4% were households with a female householder and no spouse or partner present. About 11.3% of all households were made up of individuals and 5.9% had someone living alone who was 65 years of age or older.

There were 3,471 housing units, of which 2.3% were vacant. The homeowner vacancy rate was 0.4% and the rental vacancy rate was 4.9%.

Racial composition as of the 2020 census
Race	Number	Percent
White	8,212	86.1%
Black or African American	117	1.2%
American Indian and Alaska Native	50	0.5%
Asian	185	1.9%
Native Hawaiian and Other Pacific Islander	9	0.1%
Some other race	157	1.6%
Two or more races	806	8.5%
Hispanic or Latino (of any race)	604	6.3%

== Education ==
It is in the Lewis-Palmer School District 38.

== See also ==
- Colorado Springs, CO Metropolitan Statistical Area
