= Tom Hovasse =

American basketball player and coach

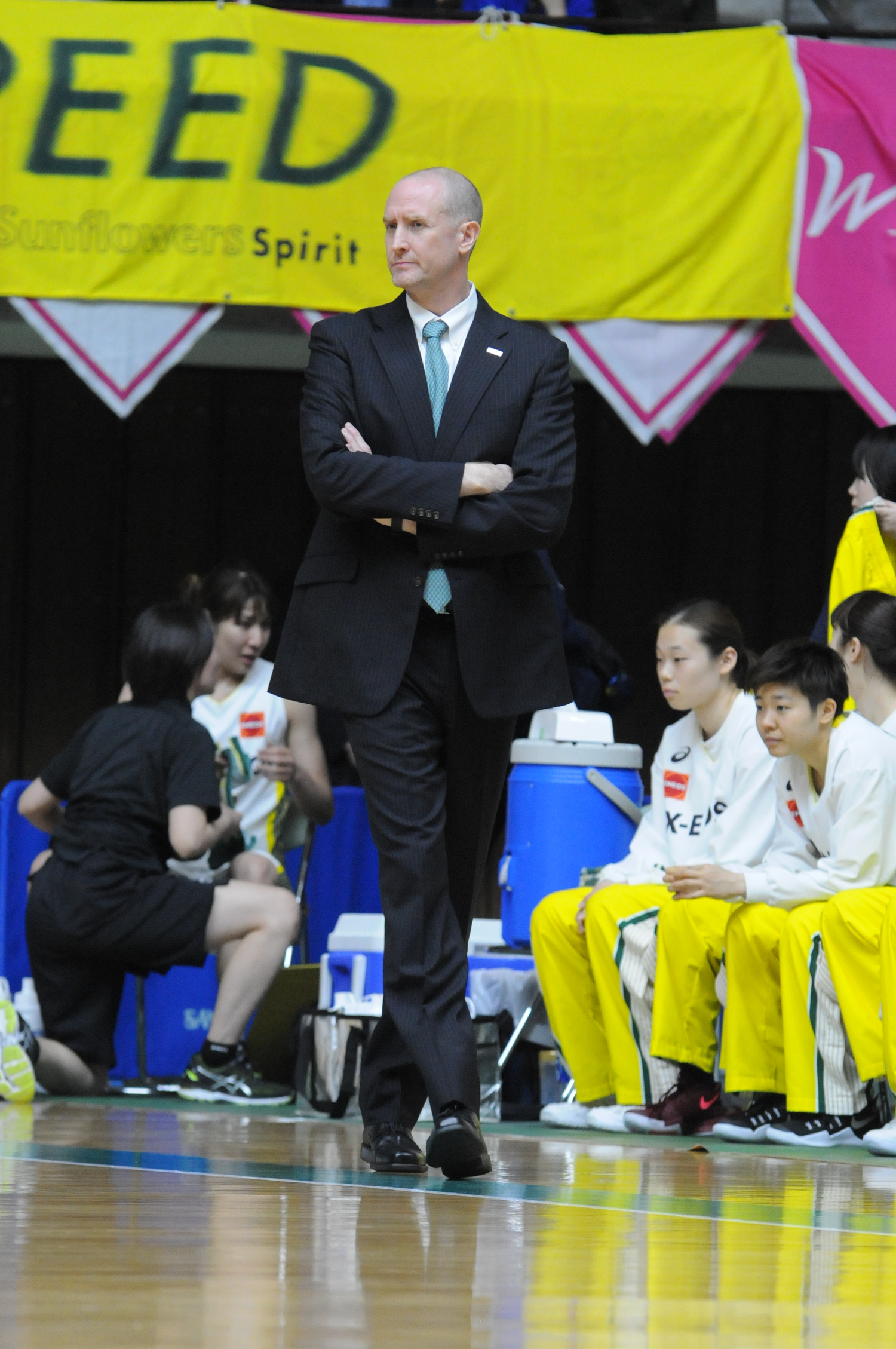

Personal information
- Born: January 31, 1967 (age 59) Durango, Colorado, U.S.
- Listed height: 6 ft 8 in (2.03 m)
- Listed weight: 205 lb (93 kg)

Career information
- High school: Widefield (Security, Colorado)
- College: Penn State (1985–1989)
- NBA draft: 1989: undrafted
- Playing career: 1989–2001
- Position: Small forward
- Number: 17
- Coaching career: 2010–present

Career history

Playing
- 1989–1990: Sporting Club of Portugal
- 1990–1994: Toyota Pacers
- 1994: Atlanta Hawks
- 1995: Pittsburgh Piranhas
- 1995–2000: Toyota Pacers
- 2000–2001: Toshiba Brave Thunders

Coaching
- 2010–2011: JX-Eneos Sunflowers (assistant)
- 2011: Japan Women (assistant)
- 2012–2013: Phoenix Mercury (assistant)
- 2013–2014: JX-Eneos Sunflowers (assistant)
- 2014–2016: JX-Eneos Sunflowers (associate head coach)
- 2015–2016: Japan Women (assistant)
- 2016–2017: JX-Eneos Sunflowers
- 2017–2021: Japan Women
- 2021–2026: Japan Men

Career highlights
- 5× JBL Scoring Leader (1990–1993, 1995)
- Stats at NBA.com
- Stats at Basketball Reference
Medals
Basketball coaching
Representing Japan
Olympic Games
Silver medal – second place	2020 Tokyo	Team
FIBA Asia Cup
Gold medal – first place	2017 Bangalore	Japan
Gold medal – first place	2019 Bangalore	Japan
Asian Games
Bronze medal – third place	2018 Jakarta	Japan

Thomas Wayne Hovasse (born January 31, 1967) is an American basketball coach and former player. After growing up in Security, Colorado, he played college basketball for the Penn State Nittany Lions. After not being selected in the 1989 NBA draft, he played professional basketball from 1989 to 2001, including a brief stint with the Atlanta Hawks of the National Basketball Association during the 1994–95 season and 10 seasons for teams in Japan.

He coached the Japan women's squad to the silver medal at the 2020 Olympics. He was the coach of the Japan men's national basketball team from 2021 to 2026.

== Career statistics ==
Legend
GP	Games played	GS	Games started	MPG	Minutes per game
FG%	Field goal percentage	3P%	3-point field goal percentage	FT%	Free throw percentage
RPG	Rebounds per game	APG	Assists per game	SPG	Steals per game
BPG	Blocks per game	PPG	Points per game	**Bold**	Career high

=== NBA ===
==== Regular season ====
Year	Team	GP	GS	MPG	FG%	3P%	FT%	RPG	APG	SPG	BPG	PPG
1994–95	Atlanta	2	0	2.0	.000	.000	–	.0	.0	.5	.0	0.0

== Head coaching record ==
Legend
Regular season	G	Games coached	W	Games won	L	Games lost	W–L %	Win–loss %
Playoffs	PG	Playoff games	PW	Playoff wins	PL	Playoff losses	PW–L %	Playoff win–loss %

Team	Year	G	W	L	W–L%	Finish	PG	PW	PL	PW–L%	Result
JX	2016–17	27	27	0	1.000	1st	7	7	0	1.000	Champion

Hovasse coached the Japan women's national basketball team at the 2020 Olympics.
