= Morgan Fox =

Morgan Fox is the name of:

- Morgan Fox (footballer) (born 1993), Welsh footballer
- Morgan Fox (American football) (born 1994), American football player
- Morgan Fox (born 1970), Canadian model
