= Vincent Jackson =

American football player (1983–2021)

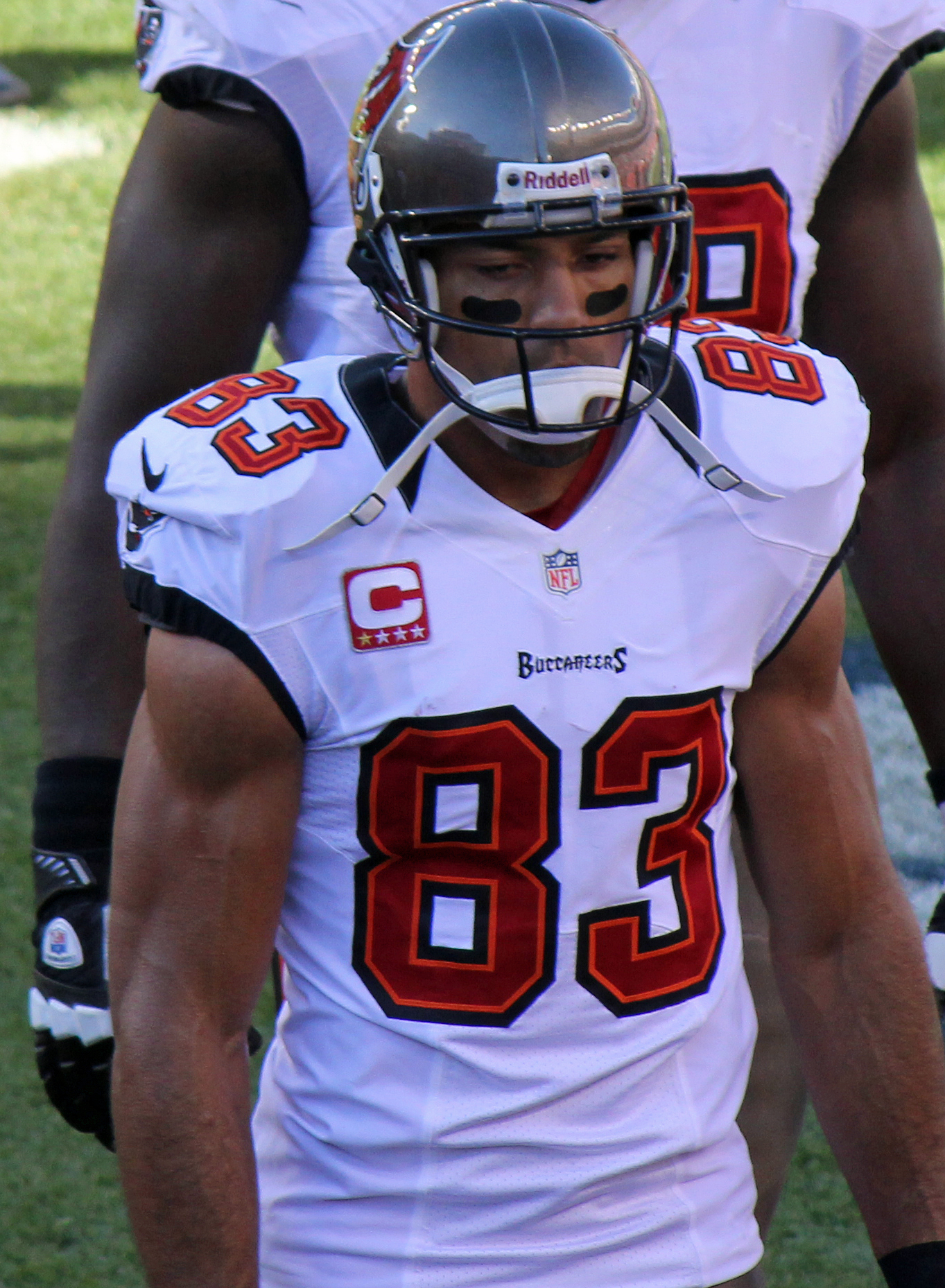
- Jackson with the Tampa Bay Buccaneers in 2012

No. 83
- Position: Wide receiver

Personal information
- Born: January 14, 1983; Colorado Springs, Colorado, U.S.
- Died: February 15, 2021 (aged 38); Brandon, Florida, U.S.
- Listed height: 6 ft 5 in (1.96 m)
- Listed weight: 230 lb (104 kg)

Career information
- High school: Widefield (Colorado Springs)
- College: Northern Colorado (2001–2004)
- NFL draft: 2005: 2nd round, 61st overall pick

Career history
- San Diego Chargers (2005–2011); Tampa Bay Buccaneers (2012–2016)

Awards and highlights
- 3× Pro Bowl (2009, 2011, 2012); Northern Colorado Bears No. 81 retired

Career NFL statistics
- Receptions: 540
- Receiving yards: 9,080
- Receiving touchdowns: 57
- Stats at Pro Football Reference

Vincent Terrell Jackson (January 14, 1983 – February 15, 2021) was an American professional football wide receiver who played for 12 seasons in the National Football League (NFL). He played college football for the Northern Colorado Bears and was selected by the San Diego Chargers in the second round of the 2005 NFL draft. Jackson also played for the Tampa Bay Buccaneers. He was selected to the Pro Bowl thrice and exceeded 1,000 receiving yards six times in his career. Jackson died in 2021, with the official cause of his death reported as chronic alcohol abuse. An autopsy found Stage 2 chronic traumatic encephalopathy in his brain.

== Early life ==
Jackson attended Widefield High School in Colorado Springs, Colorado. As a senior, he was a Rocky Mountain News All-State Honorable Mention, a first-team all-area pick, and a first-team all-conference pick. He also was a standout in basketball. A straight-A student in high school, Jackson was accepted to Columbia University, but decided to attend the University of Northern Colorado on a partial scholarship to play both basketball and football.

== College career ==
Jackson enrolled at the University of Northern Colorado and played for the Northern Colorado Bears football team from 2001 to 2004 UNC was one of the few colleges that recruited Jackson out of high school. One of the few true freshmen to ever play for Northern Colorado, Jackson earned All-American honors as a punt returner, scoring the first time he ever touched a ball on a punt return against Adams State College. He became Northern Colorado's all-time leader in receptions, receiving yards (game & season), kick return yards, punt return yards, and receiving touchdowns. His senior season was highlighted by a 13-catch, 249-yard, three-touchdown effort against Florida Atlantic. Jackson is the all-time career record holder in receiving yards and yards per catch among various other, game, season, and career records. Jackson also started for Northern Colorado in basketball, playing for two seasons at UNC and leading the team in scoring both years.

On October 9, 2021, Jackson became the second football player at University of Northern Colorado to be honored with a Jersey retirement.

== Professional career ==
Pre-draft measurables
Height	Weight	Arm length	Hand span	40-yard dash	10-yard split	20-yard split	20-yard shuttle	Three-cone drill	Vertical jump	Broad jump	Bench press
6 ft 4 3/4 in (1.95 m)	241 lb (109 kg)	32 3/4 in (0.83 m)	9 5/8 in (0.24 m)	4.51 s	1.57 s	2.58 s	4.00 s	6.84 s	39 in (0.99 m)	10 ft 9 in (3.28 m)	23 reps
Bench press, broad jump, 20-yard shuttle, and three-cone drill values from Pro Day. All other values from NFL Combine.

=== San Diego Chargers ===
==== 2005 season ====
Jackson was selected in the second round (61st overall) of the 2005 NFL draft (the highest ever by a Northern Colorado graduate) by the San Diego Chargers.

Jackson got off to a slow start in 2005 due to injuries. He was inactive for the first five games of the season and finally saw his first NFL action in an October 16 game against the Oakland Raiders. Jackson caught his first pass on November 6 against the New York Jets, but he would only catch two more passes for the rest of the season.

==== 2006 season ====
Jackson caught his first NFL touchdown on September 17, 2006, in a victory over the Tennessee Titans. In the Chargers' Christmas Eve game against the Seattle Seahawks, Jackson had a memorable touchdown catch that led the Chargers to victory. With 29 seconds left, quarterback Philip Rivers threw a touchdown pass to Jackson and the Chargers ended up winning the game 20–17 and setting a franchise record for wins. Jackson ended the season strongly and finished second on the team with six touchdown catches.

In a 2006 game against the Oakland Raiders, Jackson nearly made one of the most bizarre turnovers in recent NFL history. After making a 13-yard catch on fourth down, Jackson immediately got up and spun the ball forward in celebration. Because Jackson had fallen on his own and was not tackled, Raiders cornerback Fabian Washington believed it to be a fumble and leapt upon the ball. Possession was originally awarded to Oakland, but the Chargers were then flagged for an illegal forward pass and allowed to keep the ball.

==== 2007 season ====
By virtue of the release of Keenan McCardell and an injury to Eric Parker, Jackson entered the 2007 season as a starting wide receiver for the Chargers. He started the season in an unmemorable fashion in a home game against the Chicago Bears by dropping a sure touchdown that bounced off his chest in the end zone. However, by the end of the season, Jackson had distinguished himself as a top target for Chargers quarterback Philip Rivers.

==== 2008 season ====
In the 2008 season, Jackson had a career season with 59 receptions, seven touchdowns, and 1,098 yards. He became the first Chargers wide receiver to have 1,000 yards receiving since 2001.

==== 2009 season ====
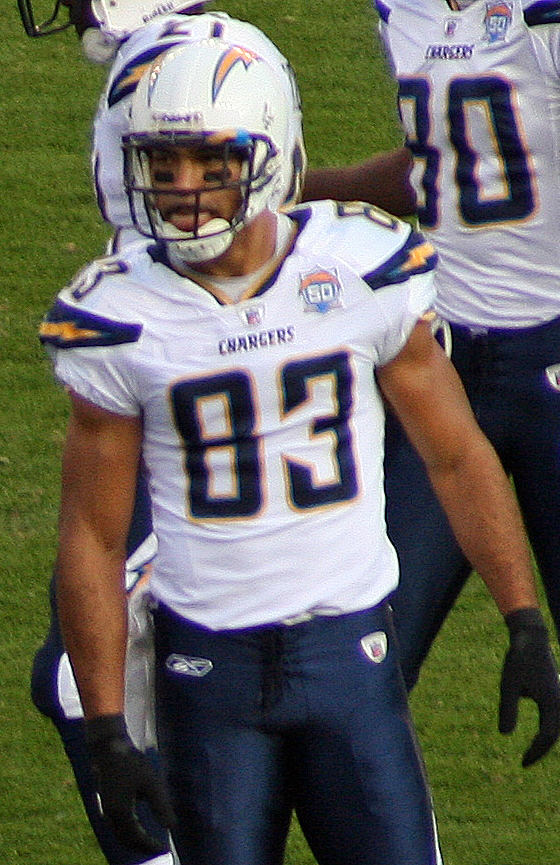
Jackson in 2009

Jackson followed his strongest season as a pro with an even stronger one during the 2009 season, when he finished with 68 receptions, and led the team in receiving with nine touchdowns and 1,167 yards. During a January 17, 2010, divisional playoff game against the New York Jets, Jackson made a 37-yard catch that was challenged by Jets head coach Rex Ryan. Jackson received an unsportsmanlike conduct penalty for kicking the challenge flag, which cost the Chargers 15 yards (the play was upheld). Jackson would finish the game with seven receptions for 111 yards, becoming the first receiver of the 2009 NFL season to record a 100-yard game on the Jets All-Pro cornerback and future Buccaneer teammate Darrelle Revis.

==== 2010 season ====
On March 2, 2010, Jackson faced arraignment for driving with a suspended license. He was handcuffed briefly and had his car impounded following a traffic stop just a few hours before the Chargers' playoff loss to the New York Jets. Jackson was pulled over for playing loud music. He was cited for driving with a suspended license and expired tags.

Jackson was selected to his first Pro Bowl during the 2009 NFL season as an alternate. Jackson had a strong showing in his first Pro Bowl appearance, racking up seven receptions for 122 yards, including a 48-yard catch and run for a touchdown.

On July 1, 2010, it was announced that Jackson had been suspended for three games for violating the league's personal conduct policy.

Following a contract dispute, Jackson returned in week 11 of the 2010 NFL season after holding out the first 10 games. In week 15 against the San Francisco 49ers, Jackson had a career-high three touchdowns and 112 yards en route to a 34–7 win. He finished the season with 14 receptions and 248 yards.

==== 2011 season ====
On February 15, 2011, the Chargers placed their franchise tag on Jackson.

During the labor dispute between league owners and players following the end of the 2010 season, a lockout occurred from March 11 to July 25. Jackson was one of the 10 plaintiffs in the Brady antitrust lawsuit against the NFL, which included star players such as Tom Brady, Peyton Manning, Drew Brees, and fellow 2010 holdout Logan Mankins. Initially, Adam Schefter of ESPN reported that Vincent Jackson wanted compensation in the form of $10 million or to become an unrestricted free agent when the lockout was over. Jackson denied reports that he had asked for compensation, but on July 23 Jackson released his claim in the Brady v. NFL lawsuit. Jackson's decision to drop his alleged request of unrestricted free agency and/or monetary compensation helped expedite the completion of the new labor deal. Jackson's Franchise Tag was held up under the new NFL CBA.

On July 29, 2011, the first day teams were permitted to sign non-rookie free agents, Jackson signed his one-year Franchise offer, thus remaining a Charger. Because of his contract holdout during the 2010 NFL season, Jackson received only $583,000 in compensation for playing in the final six games of the season. For the 2011 season, under the franchise tag, Jackson received approximately $11.4 million, almost 20 times more than in the previous season. In week nine, Jackson played a personal best of 141 yards and 3 touchdowns against the Green Bay Packers. He finished the season with totals of 60 catches for 1,106 yards and nine touchdowns. He was named to the Pro Bowl as an alternate for Wes Welker.

==== Contract dispute ====
When the NFL's Collective Bargaining Agreement expired, Jackson became a Restricted Free Agent for an additional year, causing the Chargers to place a one-year, $3.2 million tender on him. Seeking a long-term deal instead, Jackson held out of training camp. On June 15, 2010, the Chargers cut his tender to $583,000 for holding out, 110% of his salary for the 2009 NFL season.

On August 20, 2010, the Chargers placed him on the Roster Exempt List, meaning that he would have to serve a three-game suspension once he had agreed to a contract. The National Football League Players Association arranged a deal in which, if Jackson was traded by the Chargers by 4 PM on September 22, he would have instead been placed on the Commissioner Exempt List, rolling six games of suspensions (three for pleading guilty to drunk driving and three for being placed on the roster exempt list) into four. No deal materialized. The agreement also stipulated that he could be traded two days before the NFL trade deadline, but once again no deal materialized in that time. On October 29, 2010, Jackson ended his hold-out and signed the one-year tender. The deadline to sign and accrue a full season, so that he would be an unrestricted free agent in 2011, was October 30, 2010.

=== Tampa Bay Buccaneers ===
==== 2012 season ====
On March 13, 2012, Jackson signed a five-year, $55.55 million contract with the Tampa Bay Buccaneers. On September 7, Jackson was elected a team captain.

On October 21 against the New Orleans Saints, Jackson set multiple Buccaneer records, with the longest reception and longest play from scrimmage in Tampa Bay history (95 yards) and the most receiving yards in a single game (216 yards). Jackson was selected to his third Pro Bowl to replace the injured Calvin Johnson.

Jackson finished the 2012 season with career-highs in receptions (72) and receiving yards (1,384).

==== 2013 season ====
On September 5, 2013, Jackson was selected as one of the 2013 team captains.

On October 13, 2013, in a game against the Philadelphia Eagles, Jackson caught his first touchdown since December 2012. He finished the day with nine catches for 114 yards and two touchdowns. The next week, against the Atlanta Falcons, Jackson again had multiple touchdowns while eclipsing the 100 yard mark. At the conclusion of a 4–12 season, Jackson proved to be one of the few bright spots on a football team in disarray, compiling 78 catches for 1,224 yards and seven touchdowns.

==== 2014 season ====
The 2014 season saw declines in Jackson's catches and yards due to the emergence of rookie wide receiver Mike Evans. Jackson also was the center of trade rumors before the trade deadline but was ultimately not traded. He finished the 2014 season with over 1,000 yards for the sixth time in his career. He and fellow receiver Mike Evans became the first Buccaneer duo to ever catch for over 1,000 yards. In Week 12, Jackson surpassed 8,000 career receiving yards in a game against the Chicago Bears.

==== 2015 season ====
With the arrival of rookie quarterback Jameis Winston and new offensive coordinator Dirk Koetter, Jackson's numbers saw further decline during the 2015 season, during which injuries and inconsistent play resulted in Jackson's fewest catches (33), yards (543), and touchdowns (3) since coming to Tampa. On December 30, 2015, Jackson was placed on injured reserve, ending his season.

==== 2016 season ====
On October 18, 2016, Jackson was placed on injured reserve after suffering a knee injury during a Week 5 victory over the Carolina Panthers.

=== Retirement ===
Jackson announced his retirement on May 17, 2018.

== NFL career statistics ==
Legend
	Led the league
**Bold**	Career high

=== Regular season ===
Year	Team	Games		Receiving					Rushing					Fumbles	
Year	Team	GP	GS	Rec	Yds	Avg	Lng	TD	Att	Yds	Avg	Lng	TD	Fum	Lost
2005	SD	8	0	3	59	19.7	21	0	—	—	—	—	—	0	0
2006	SD	**16**	7	27	453	16.8	55	6	3	16	5.3	8	0	0	0
2007	SD	**16**	**16**	41	623	15.2	45	3	—	—	—	—	—	0	0
2008	SD	**16**	**16**	59	1,098	18.6	60	7	**4**	**69**	**17.3**	31	0	**1**	**1**
2009	SD	15	15	68	1,167	17.2	55	**9**	3	11	3.7	12	0	0	0
2010	SD	5	5	14	248	17.7	58	3	1	14	14.0	14	0	0	0
2011	SD	**16**	**16**	60	1,106	18.4	58	**9**	3	51	17.0	**41**	0	0	0
2012	TB	**16**	**16**	72	**1,384**	**19.2**	**95**	8	—	—	—	—	—	0	0
2013	TB	**16**	**16**	**78**	1,224	15.7	60	7	1	0	0.0	0	0	**1**	0
2014	TB	**16**	**16**	70	1,002	14.3	50	2	1	0	0.0	0	0	**1**	**1**
2015	TB	10	9	33	543	16.5	36	3	—	—	—	—	—	0	0
2016	TB	5	5	15	173	11.5	18	0	—	—	—	—	—	0	0
Total		155	137	540	9,080	16.8	95	57	15	161	10.7	41	0	3	2
Source: Pro Football Reference

=== Postseason ===
Year	Team	Games		Receiving					Rushing					Fumbles	
Year	Team	GP	GS	Rec	Yds	Avg	Lng	TD	Att	Yds	Avg	Lng	TD	Fum	Lost
2006	SD	1	1	2	43	21.5	21	0	—	—	—	—	—	0	0
2007	SD	**3**	**3**	**18**	**300**	16.7	34	**2**	—	—	—	—	—	0	0
2008	SD	2	2	2	49	**24.5**	**41**	1	—	—	—	—	—	0	0
2009	SD	1	1	7	111	15.9	37	0	—	—	—	—	—	0	0
Total		7	7	29	503	17.3	41	3	0	0	0.0	0	0	0	0
Source: Pro Football Reference

== Personal life ==
Jackson, in 2013 during a visit at Camp Leatherneck in Afghanistan

Both of Jackson's parents served in the United States Armed Forces. He sponsored military families at every Buccaneers home game through the 'Jackson in Action' Front Row Fans section at Raymond James Stadium.

In November 2012, Jackson spoke to students at Northwest Elementary about the importance of physical fitness, helped present a $10,000 Play 60 grant, and led students through a physical education class to congratulate the winners of the Play 60 Super School contest.

In 2016, Jackson graduated from the University of South Florida with a degree in Business Management.

== Death ==
On February 15, 2021, Jackson was found dead by a housekeeper in a room at Homewood Suites near Brandon, Florida. There were no apparent signs of trauma. Two days later, the sheriff of Hillsborough County announced that Jackson's family said he may have suffered from chronic alcoholism, which contributed to his death. He also stated that they believed he suffered from the brain disease chronic traumatic encephalopathy (CTE), which can only be confirmed after death from a biopsy of the brain. The family responded that the sheriff did not speak on their behalf. They donated Jackson's brain to the Boston University CTE Center. His body was cremated after his family held a private funeral service.

Jackson's family confirmed on December 16, 2021, that researchers had discovered Stage 2 CTE in his brain. He is one of at least 345 NFL players to be diagnosed after death with this disease. Six days later, the Hillsborough County Florida Medical Examiner concluded that official cause of Jackson's death was chronic alcohol use.

== See also ==
- List of NFL players with chronic traumatic encephalopathy
