= Widefield High School =

Location
- 615 Widefield Drive; Colorado Springs, Colorado 80911; United States
- Coordinates: 38°45′18″N 104°44′7″W

Information
- School type: Public high school
- Established: 1957 (69 years ago)
- School district: Widefield 3
- CEEB code: 060299
- NCES School ID: 080648001129
- Principal: Jessica Bitting
- Teaching staff: 71.66 (on an FTE basis)
- Grades: 9–12
- Enrollment: 1,239 (2023–2024)
- Student to teacher ratio: 17.29
- Colors: Columbia blue and silver
- Athletics conference: CHSAA
- Mascot: Gladiator
- Website: whs.wsd3.org

Widefield High School is a high school in Security-Widefield, Colorado, United States. It opened its doors in 1958 and is the older of the two high schools in Widefield School District 3. Widefield's mascot is the Gladiator and its colors are navy blue, Columbia blue, silver and white.

== Athletics ==
Widefield High School competes in the 4-A Pikes Peak Athletic Conference. The Gladiators play their home games for both football and soccer at C.A. Foster Stadium, which is shared with Mesa Ridge High School. Widefield plays their home baseball games down the street from the school at the Widefield Community Center.

Recently Widefield High School has enjoyed much success in football, baseball, basketball, wrestling, and soccer, with football making it to the 2010 state playoffs. The school's district rival is Mesa Ridge High School. The Gladiators also have a rival in nearby Fountain-Fort Carson High School.

In 1970, the Widefield boys' basketball team lost the AAA State Championship game to Cherry Creek. They only lost one game in the regular season, to Harrison, to finish with a 21-2 record overall. They later won the 5A basketball state championship in 1985. On March 15, 2008, the Widefield Gladiators boys' basketball team competed in the 2008 State Boys Basketball Championship game. The team ended up losing 63-59 to the Lincoln Lancers, becoming the state runners-up.

== Performing arts ==
The Widefield High School performing arts program is one of the best in the district. The Chamber Orchestra won 1st place in the Cavalcade Showcase of Music competition, regarded as "one of America’s first-class high school and middle school music competitions" and a spot to perform at the prestigious Colorado Music Educator's Association conference at The Broadmoor.

== Fight song ==
Widefield High School's fight song is "The Victors".

== Notable alumni ==
- Boris Berian (born 1992), track and field athlete
- Darryl Clack (born 1963), former NFL running back
- Sean Hill (born 1971), former NFL defensive back
- Tom Hovasse (born 1967), former NBA forward
- Paul Hubbard (born 1985), former NFL wide receiver
- Vincent Jackson (1983–2021), former NFL wide receiver
- Chuck Rozanski (born 1955), comic book retailer and writer
- Brian Walker (born 1972), former NFL safety
