= Stratmoor, Colorado =

Census-designated place in El Paso County, CO, USA

- Census-designated place
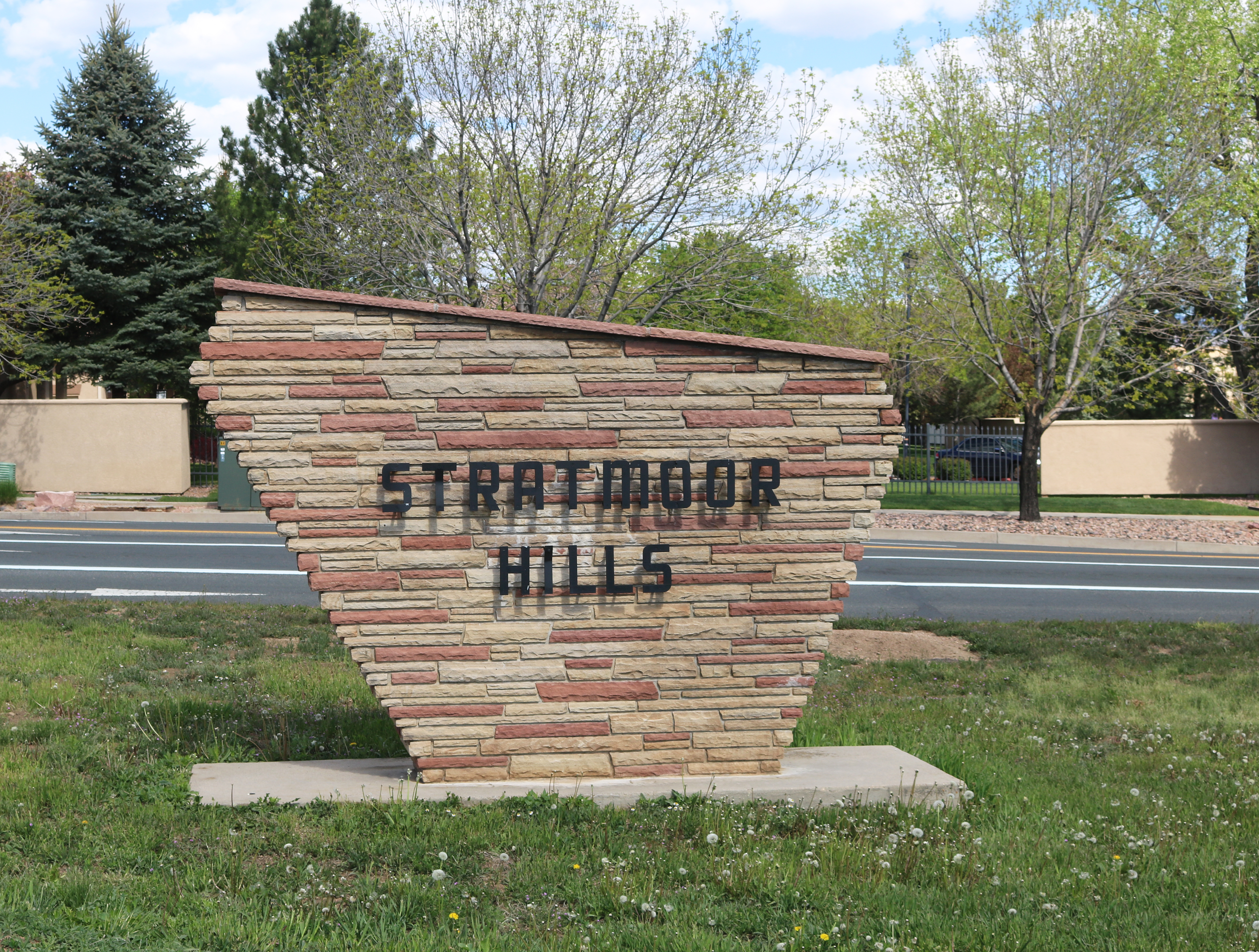
- The sign for the Stratmoor Hills subdivision in Stratmoor.

- Location of the Stratmoor CDP in El Paso County, Colorado
- Coordinates: 38°46′23″N 104°46′43″W
- Country: United States
- State: Colorado
- County: El Paso County

Government
  - Type: Unincorporated community

Area
  - Total: 2.654 sq mi (6.874 km^{2})
  - Land: 2.633 sq mi (6.819 km^{2})
  - Water: 0.021 sq mi (0.055 km^{2})
- Elevation: 5,781 ft (1,762 m)

Population (2020)
  - Total: 6,518
  - Density: 2,476/sq mi (955.9/km^{2})
- Time zone: UTC-7 (MST)
  - Summer (DST): UTC-6 (MDT)
- ZIP Code: Colorado Springs 80906
- Area code: 719
- GNIS feature ID: 2410011

Stratmoor is an unincorporated community and a census-designated place (CDP) of which is both located, and governed by El Paso County, Colorado, United States. The CDP is a part of the Colorado Springs, CO Metropolitan Statistical Area. The population of the Stratmoor CDP was 6,518 at the United States Census 2020. The Colorado Springs post office (Zip Codes 80906).

== History ==
=== Partial annexation by the City of Fountain ===
A portion of the Stratmoor CDP was annexed by the City of Fountain in 2014. Specifically, the area annexed was a 60-acre parcel just to the west of Interstate 25 at Exit 135 and north of South Academy Boulevard. The annexed land now includes several retailers and restaurants.

== Geography ==
The Stratmoor CDP has an area of 1,699 acres (6.874 km^{2}), including 14 acres (0.055 km^{2}) of water.

== Demographics ==
The United States Census Bureau initially defined the Stratmoor CDP for the 1980 United States census.

Stratmoor CDP, Colorado
Year	Pop.	±%
1980	5,519	—
1990	5,854	+6.1%
2000	6,650	+13.6%
2010	6,900	+3.8%
2020	6,518	−5.5%
Source: United States Census Bureau

=== 2020 census ===
As of the 2020 census, Stratmoor had a population of 6,518. The median age was 32.4 years. 26.8% of residents were under the age of 18 and 12.4% of residents were 65 years of age or older. For every 100 females there were 98.7 males, and for every 100 females age 18 and over there were 95.5 males age 18 and over.

100.0% of residents lived in urban areas, while 0.0% lived in rural areas.

There were 2,341 households in Stratmoor, of which 35.8% had children under the age of 18 living in them. Of all households, 40.3% were married-couple households, 21.0% were households with a male householder and no spouse or partner present, and 29.0% were households with a female householder and no spouse or partner present. About 23.8% of all households were made up of individuals and 8.5% had someone living alone who was 65 years of age or older.

There were 2,479 housing units, of which 5.6% were vacant. The homeowner vacancy rate was 2.4% and the rental vacancy rate was 5.6%.

Racial composition as of the 2020 census
Race	Number	Percent
White	3,739	57.4%
Black or African American	613	9.4%
American Indian and Alaska Native	148	2.3%
Asian	157	2.4%
Native Hawaiian and Other Pacific Islander	26	0.4%
Some other race	752	11.5%
Two or more races	1,083	16.6%
Hispanic or Latino (of any race)	2,088	32.0%

== Education ==
The Harrison School District 2 covers the majority of the CDP. A small piece is within the Widefield School District 3.

== See also ==
- Colorado Springs, CO Metropolitan Statistical Area
