= Darryl Clack =

American gridiron football player (born 1963)

No. 22, 33, 42
- Positions: Running back, return specialist

Personal information
- Born: October 29, 1963 (age 63); San Antonio, Texas, U.S.
- Listed height: 5 ft 10 in (1.78 m)
- Listed weight: 219 lb (99 kg)

Career information
- High school: Widefield (Colorado Springs, Colorado)
- College: Arizona State
- NFL draft: 1986: 2nd round, 33rd overall pick

Career history
- Dallas Cowboys (1986–1989); Cleveland Browns (1990)*; Toronto Argonauts (1991); Orlando Thunder (1992)
- * Offseason or practice squad member only

Awards and highlights
- Grey Cup champion (1991); All-World League (1992); First-team All-Pac-10 (1984); 2× second-team All-Pac-10 (1982, 1983)

Career NFL statistics
- Rushing yards: 113
- Rushing average: 3.9
- Return yards: 1,802
- Total touchdowns: 3
- Stats at Pro Football Reference

Darryl Earl Clack (born October 29, 1963) is an American former professional football player who was a running back for the Dallas Cowboys of the National Football League (NFL). He played college football for the Arizona State Sun Devils and was selected by the Cowboys in the second round of the 1986 NFL draft. He also was a member of the Toronto Argonauts in the Canadian Football League (CFL).

== Early life ==
Clack was a native of San Antonio, Texas, before moving to Colorado during high school. Known as "Mr. Click" back then, he attended Widefield High School.

He was at his best in track and field, winning the state championship in the 100 metres in his junior and senior years. He missed winning in a closed finish as a sophomore, but won the 200 metres and the 400 metres in each of his last three years in high school. He set the state-record time of 10.65 seconds in the 100 metres, 21.22 in the 200 and 47.95 in the 400. He also contributed to Widefield winning team state titles in 1979, 1980 and 1981.

Clack earned All-state honors at running back as a senior. He also practiced basketball.

In 1982, he was named Colorado Prep Athlete of the Year. In 2006, he was inducted into the Colorado Springs Hall of Fame. In 1993, he was inducted into the Colorado High School Hall of Fame.

== College career ==
Clack accepted a football scholarship from Arizona State University. In 1982, he became the first freshman to lead the Sun Devils in rushing in 30 years. His season culminated with the 32-21 win over the University of Oklahoma in the 1983 Fiesta Bowl, with him scoring a third-quarter touchdown. Even as a freshman, his popularity reached a point that metal noisemakers known as "Darryl Clackers", were being sold by stadium vendors. He posted 606 rushing yards, 116 receiving yards and 9 touchdowns.

As a sophomore, he registered 932 rushing yards (led the Pac-10), 299 receiving yards and 9 touchdowns. His 221 rushing yards against Wichita State University ranked sixth All-time in the school rushing list. He became the first player in school history to gain over 100 yards rushing and receiving in the same game (116 rushing and 134 receiving against USC).

As a junior, he posted 1,052 rushing yards, 32 receptions for 385 yards, 6 touchdowns and had five 100-yard rushing days.

His senior season was cut short when he suffered a fractured right fibula in the second game of the season against Pacific University, sidelining him for 7 games. He returned to play in the 1985 Holiday Bowl, gaining 36 yards on nine carries.

Clack finished his college career fifth on the school's All-time rushing list, recording 2,711 rushing yards (fifth in school history), 5.1-yard average, 21 rushing touchdowns, 70 receptions, 840 receiving yards, 3 receiving touchdowns and eleven 100-yard games (Arizona State was 10-1 in those contests).

He also was a member of the track and field team for three years.

== Professional career ==
=== Dallas Cowboys ===
Clack was selected by the Dallas Cowboys in the second round (33rd overall) of the 1986 NFL draft, to be the backup and possible successor to Tony Dorsett. Unfortunately for Clack, that was the same year that Herschel Walker arrived to the team from the United States Football League (USFL).

The talent level at running back, relegated him to returning kickoffs. As a rookie, he averaged 22.2 yards per kickoff return and would have qualified for fifth place in the NFC with one more return. Against the Washington Redskins, he had a career high 51-yard return. In 1987, his 21.9-yard per kickoff return placed him seventh in the NFC.

In 1988, he was the NFC's third leading kickoff returner with a 21.6-yard average. In 1989, he had just 3 kickoff returns, finishing 2 returns short of Mel Renfro's franchise record of 85. On November 21, he was waived as part of the rebuilding process, to make room for rookie running back Curtis Stewart who was promoted from the developmental squad.

=== Cleveland Browns ===
On March 8, 1990, he signed as a free agent with the Cleveland Browns. He was released on September 3.

=== Toronto Argonauts ===
On September 5, 1991, he was signed to the practice roster of the Toronto Argonauts of the Canadian Football League. He played in the Grey Cup championship game. He appeared in 4 games as a backup running back, registering 22 carries for 24 yards.

=== Orlando Thunder ===
In 1992, he signed with the Orlando Thunder of the World League of American Football. He became the team's starter at running back, tallying 517 rushing yards and 6 touchdowns, while receiving All-World League honors at the end of the season.

== Personal life ==
After his playing days, Clack went to the University of Texas at El Paso earning a B.A. in Kinesiology and Sports Studies. He moved around the business world for a time and settled into the banking business as vice president at Compass Bank in Tempe, Arizona, not far from the Arizona State University campus. After banking he accumulated over 15 years of extensive experience in management and leadership at various companies including Cox Communications.

He then earned an M.A. in Organizational Management from the University of Phoenix and was in his first year of working towards a Ph.D. when he fell ill to Thrombotic thrombocytopenic purpura (TTP), a rare autoimmune blood disorder.

In addition to TTP, in July 2016, he learned of his early-stage dementia diagnose, due to years of trauma to the head from playing football.

These traumatic events, three months apart, prompted Darryl to write the book "Hear My Story Before I Forget" and start a foundation to bring awareness to TTP and brain injuries.

Although he is no longer playing ball, he keeps his hand in the game as President and co-founder of SportMetric, along with co-founders Josh Jakubczak and Darius Perry, a company emphasizing education, community involvement, and athletics for the youth.
