= Fountain-Fort Carson School District 8 =

School district in Colorado, United States

Address
- 10665 Jimmy Camp Road Fountain, Colorado, 80817; United States
- Coordinates: 38°40′32″N 104°41′11″W

District information
- Type: Public school district
- Motto: Preparing today's youth for tomorrow's responsibilities.
- Grades: P–12
- Superintendent: Keith Owen
- Schools: 13
- NCES District ID: 0804080

Students and staff
- Students: 7,885
- Teachers: 482.58 (on an FTE basis)
- Staff: 1,055.89 (on an FTE basis)
- Student–teacher ratio: 16.34

Other information
- Website: www.ffc8.org

Fountain-Fort Carson School District 8, shortened as FFC8 or D8, is a public school district serving the southwestern area of El Paso County, Colorado, United States. Its schools are mostly based in Fountain, but it also has schools on the nearby Fort Carson military installation.

The district covers the majority of, though not all of, the municipality of Fountain. It also covers Rock Creek Park, a section of the Fort Carson census-designated place, and sections of Colorado Springs.

== List of schools ==
Fountain-Fort Carson School District 8 has thirteen schools, including five on Fort Carson.

School name	Grades	Enrollment (2023–24)	Location	Website
Abrams Elementary School	K–5	403	Fort Carson	abrams.ffc8.org
Aragon Elementary School	P–5	378	Fountain	aragon.ffc8.org
Carson Middle School	6–8	604	Fort Carson	cms.ffc8.org
Conrad Early Learning Center	Preschool	233	Fountain	preschools.ffc8.org/conrad
Eagleside Elementary School	P–5	354	Fountain	eagleside.ffc8.org
Fountain Middle School	6–8	1,022	Fountain	fms.ffc8.org
Fountain-Fort Carson High School	9–12	1,968	Fountain	ffchs.ffc8.org
Jordahl Elementary School	K–5	521	Fountain	jordahl.ffc8.org
Mesa Elementary School	K–5	667	Fountain	mesa.ffc8.org
Mountainside Elementary School	K–5	354	Fort Carson	mountainside.ffc8.org
Patriot Elementary School	K–5	520	Fort Carson	patriot.ffc8.org
Weikel Elementary School	P–5	758	Fort Carson	weikel.ffc8.org
Welte Education Center	9–12	103	Fountain	welte.ffc8.org
