= Don Cockroft =

American football player (born 1945)

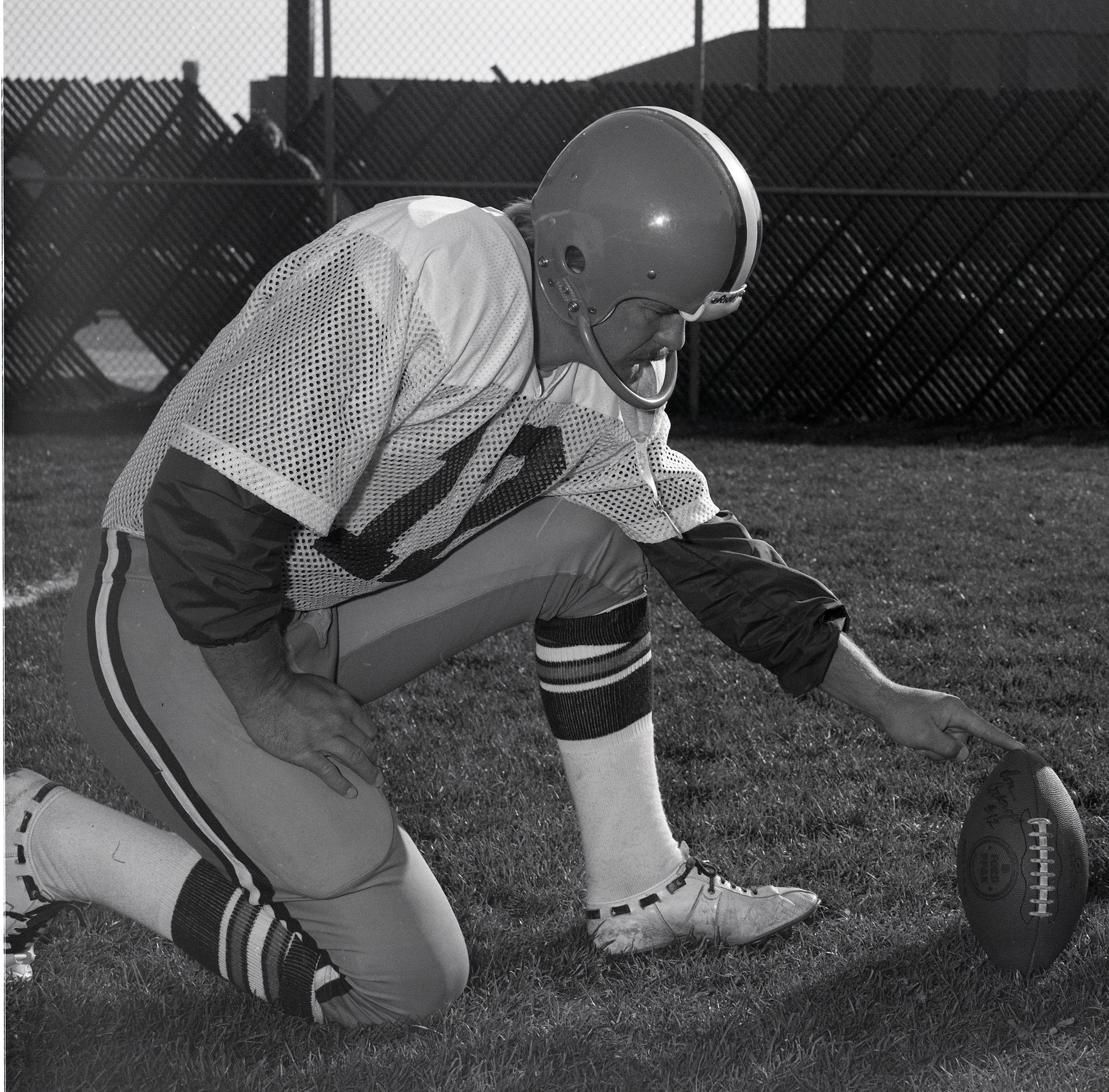
- Cockroft in 1978

No. 12
- Position: Punter / Placekicker

Personal information
- Born: February 6, 1945 (age 81); Cheyenne, Wyoming, U.S.
- Listed height: 6 ft 2 in (1.88 m)
- Listed weight: 195 lb (88 kg)

Career information
- High school: Fountain-Fort Carson (Fountain, Colorado)
- College: Adams State
- NFL draft: 1967: 3rd round, 55th overall pick

Career history
- Cleveland Browns (1968–1980)

Awards and highlights
- PFW Golden Toe Award (1972); Cleveland Browns Legends

Career NFL statistics
- Field goal attempts: 328
- Field goals made: 216
- Field goal %: 65.9
- Stats at Pro Football Reference

Donald Lee Cockroft (born February 6, 1945) is an American former professional football player who was a punter and placekicker for 13 seasons with the Cleveland Browns of the National Football League (NFL). He has the third most career points for a Brown behind fellow kickers Phil Dawson (second) and Lou Groza.

Cockroft attended Adams State and tried to make the team as a walk-on quarterback in 1963. However, when he was asked if he could instead do placekicking, he went with the suggestion with the encouragement of his mother to not quit. He won the kicking competition and became the punter. He set a national record for punting average in 1966 with 48.1 yards per punt as an NAIA All-American. His #0 jersey was subsequently retired. He was inducted into the Rocky Mountain Athletic Conference Hall of Fame in 2008.

Cockroft served as the Browns' primary punter and placekicker for the first nine seasons of his career. In 1977, he dropped punting from his duties and became solely a placekicker. He and Tampa Bay Buccaneers kicker/punter Dave Green were two of the last NFL players to lead their teams in both punting and kicking in the same season (1976).

He was involved in the January 4, 1981, American Football Conference divisional play-off game versus the Oakland Raiders. Cockroft missed field goals from 47 and 30-yards in the second quarter. The Browns scored a touchdown on a 42-yard interception by Ron Bolton with 6:02 left in the second quarter, but the extra point attempt by Cockroft was blocked. Cockroft made two subsequent field goals in the game to give them a 12–7 lead going into the final quarter. While the Raiders scored to take the lead, Cleveland, trailing 14–12, decided to go with a play called Red Right 88 to throw the ball with the ball at the 13-yard line with less than a minute remaining. The ball was intercepted, sealing the game. He was released following training camp in 1981 and subsequently retired a few weeks later.

Later NFL players to have this dual role were Steve Little of the St. Louis Cardinals in 1979, Russell Erxleben of the New Orleans Saints briefly in 1979 and 1980, and Frank Corral for the Los Angeles Rams in 1980 and 1981.

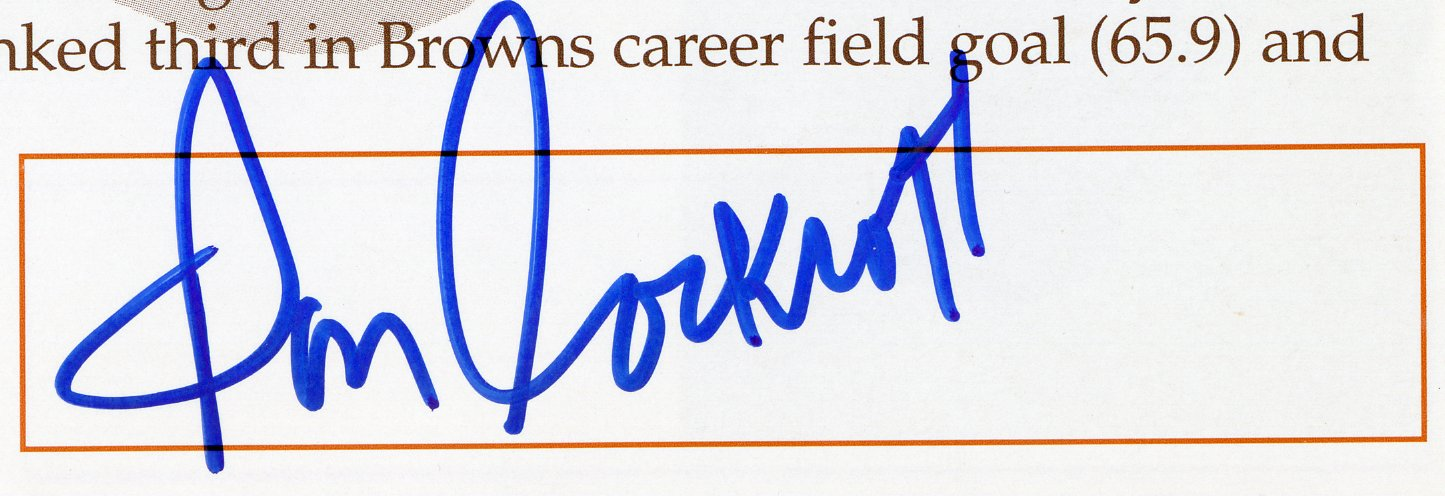

After his career ended, he became involved with the mortgage business while also serving as motivational speaker and a volunteer for various local chapters of the Fellowship of Christian Athletes. He also wrote a book about the 1980 team called The 1980 Kardiac Kids- Our Untold Stories. In 2022, Cockroft was diagnosed with Alzheimer's disease and subsequently settled down in Colorado.
