= May Natural History Museum =

Natural history museum in Colorado

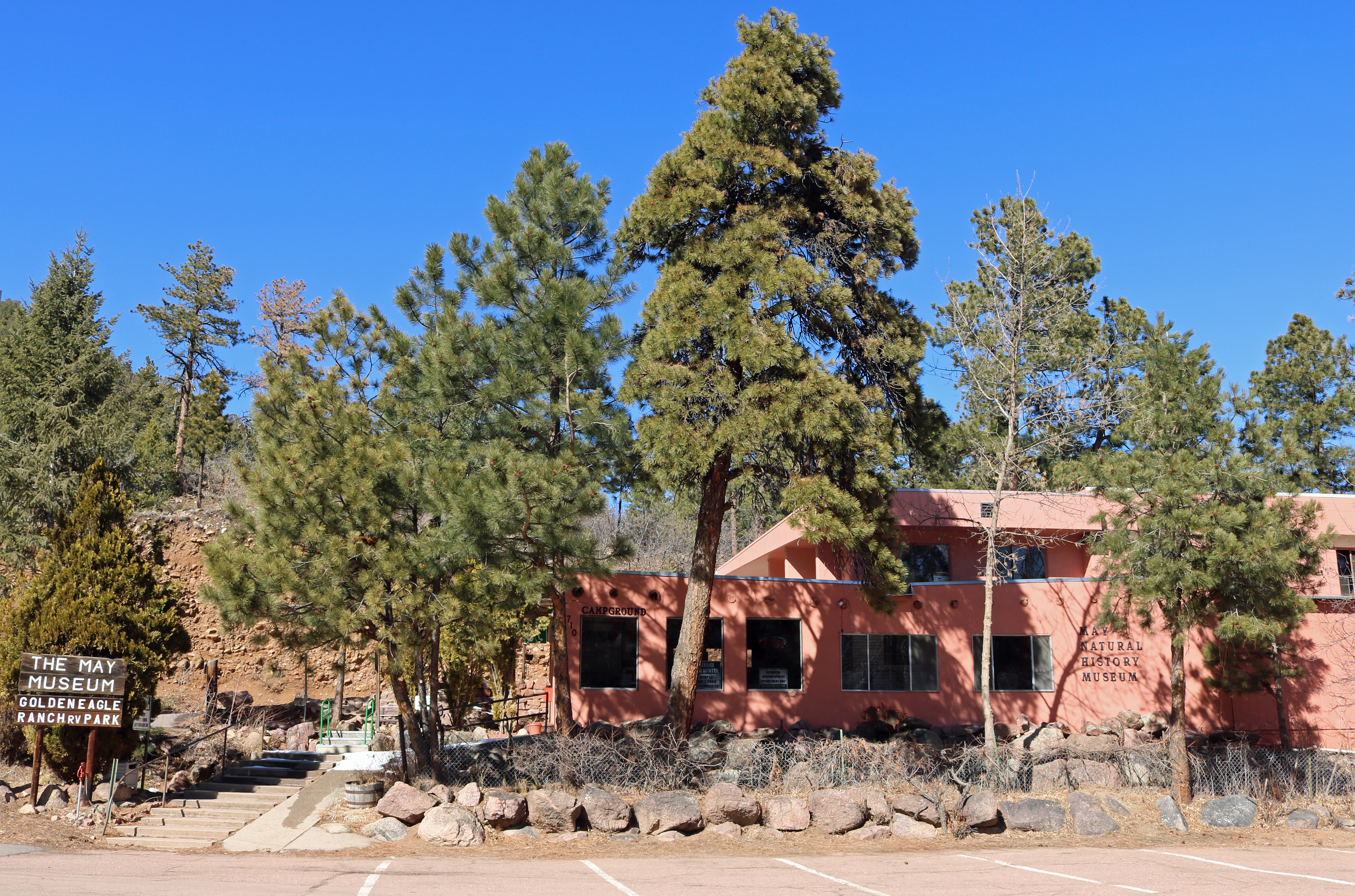
- The museum entrance
- Former names: May Museum of Natural History of The Tropics
- Established: 1952
- Location: Rock Creek Park, Colorado, United States
- Coordinates: 38.7051511°N 104.8406412°W
- Type: Natural history museum
- Collections: Insects
- Collection size: approximately 7,000 specimens
- Founder: John May
- President: Carla Marjorie Harris
- Website: coloradospringsbugmuseum.com

May Natural History Museum is an entomology museum in Rock Creek Park, Colorado. The museum describes its holdings as the world's largest private insect collection. The museum's insects and arachnids were collected by amateur naturalist James May from 1903 until his death in 1956; the museum was founded by his son, John May, in 1952.

== Description ==
The May Museum consists of unique 7,000 specimens of insects and spiders housed in custom-made cases with handwritten labels. The collection includes a wide variety of insects including beetles, butterflies, centipedes, and more, from locations in South America, Africa, Asia, and elsewhere. Some specimens included in the museum's collections are now thought to be extinct.

The museum is advertised by a giant statue of a Hercules beetle known as Herkimer, the world's largest beetle. Herkimer stands on Colorado State Highway 115 as a landmark directing visitors to the museum and campgrounds.

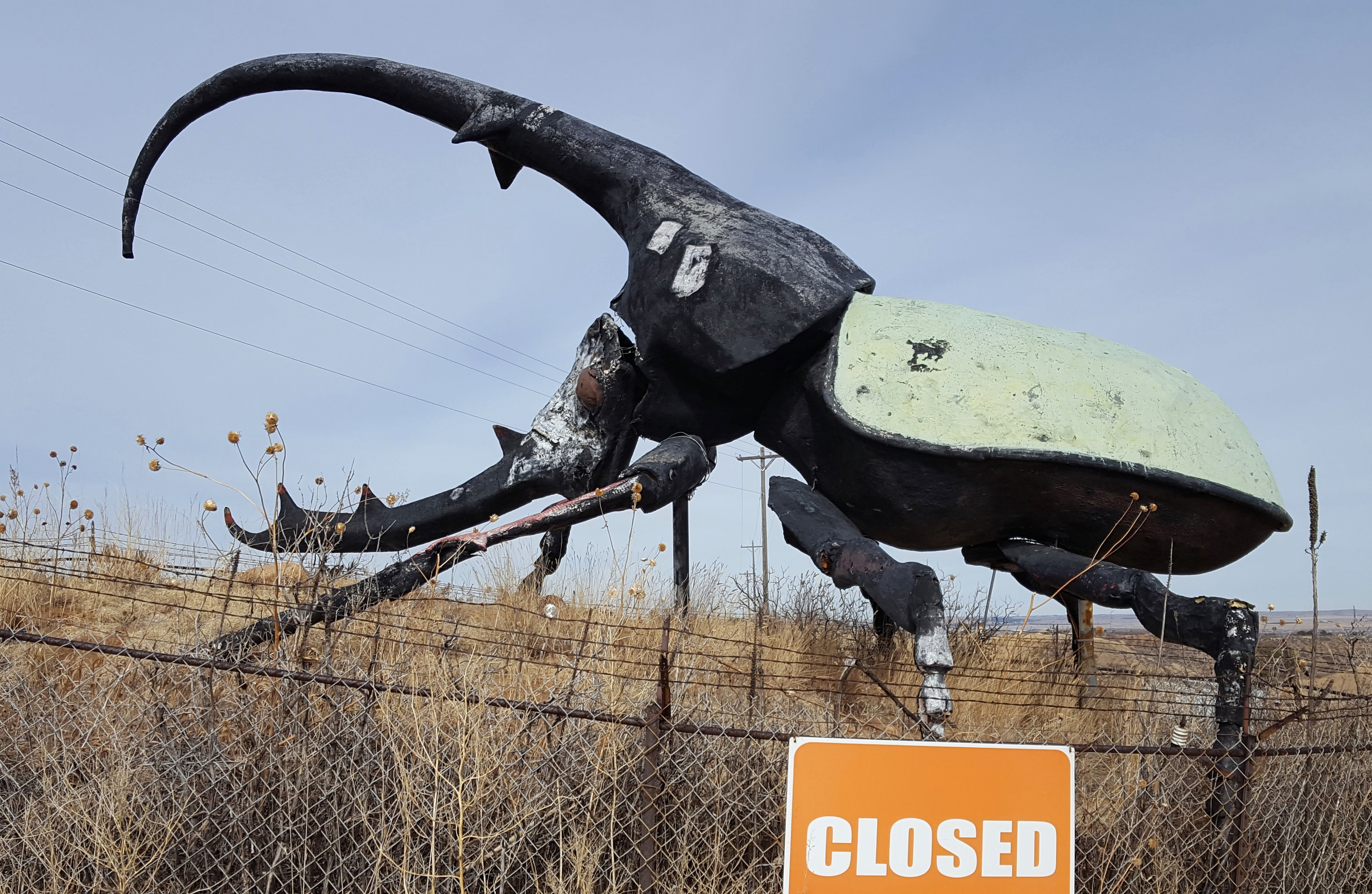
Herkimer, the world's largest beetle (2018).

== History ==
James Frederick William May was born in England, where his father was a collector for the British Museum. May's father brought his family to Brazil, where James May grew up. May was injured in the Second Boer War in 1899 and rescued by a group of Zulu people; while recuperating, May began collecting insects. May spent his life traveling the world, collecting insects, and trading with collectors until his death in 1956.

One of his sons, John May, recognized the opportunity to make money showing his father's collection. John built airtight wooden display cases and collapsible stands for the cases in the 1930s, and the family traveled to fairs, shows, and expositions, funding their travels through small donations from visitors. John May built Herkimer, the enormous beetle statue, in 1958 to attract visitors to their traveling collection, with Herkimer strapped to the roof of their trailer truck.

In 1942, the family bought 1,000 acres of land south of Colorado Springs to serve as a more permanent post for their operations. The dry climate of Colorado was ideal for preserving the collections. The May Natural History Museum of the Tropics opened to the public in 1952. They opened a campground in 1960 which includes access to hiking trails and fishing ponds.

Walt Disney visited the museum in 1956 and offered to buy the collection, but May refused after learning he would get no credit for building the collection. In the mid-1950s, the Mays opened a branch of the museum at the Weeki Wachee Springs tourist attraction in Florida. When MGM Studios bought Weeki Wachee Springs a few years later, the Mays decided not to sell their collection and returned home to Colorado Springs.

The May Natural History Museum was featured on a 2015 episode of Strange Inheritance, a Fox Business Network reality television show, focusing on the history of the collection and the family's choice to continue funding the museum by selling the water rights to the land.
