= Mesa Ridge High School =

Location
- 6070 Mesa Ridge Parkway; Colorado Springs, Colorado 80911; United States; 38°43′19″N 104°42′37″W

Information
- Type: Public school
- Established: 1997 (29 years ago)
- School district: Widefield 3
- CEEB code: 060259
- Principal: Joshua Trahan
- Staff: 69.20 (FTE)
- Grades: 9-12
- Student to teacher ratio: 18.14
- Colors: Purple and black
- Athletics conference: 4A Southern Colorado Springs Metro League
- Mascot: Grizzly
- Website: mrhs.wsd3.org

Mesa Ridge High School is a school in Widefield School District 3, a school district in El Paso County, Colorado. The school is zoned to receive students from Fountain, and the Colorado Springs suburbs of Security and Widefield. Mesa Ridge opened in 1997. The first graduating class commenced in 2000. Mesa Ridge is the newest of three high schools in the district, after Widefield High School and Discovery High School. The district also includes a K-12 online school, The Haven.

== Academics ==
Mesa Ridge is a comprehensive public high school offering traditional high school courses as well as honors and Advanced Placement, Career & Technical Programs, and Concurrent Enrollment.

Career & Technical (CTE) Programs include Automotive Services; Business Management & Marketing; Cabinetry and General Construction through the MiLL; Cosmetology through ISSA; Information Technology; and Work-Based Learning.

Mesa Ridge also offers Project Lead the Way (PLTW), a national program that brings together industry, higher education, and public schools to prepare students for post-secondary careers. Students can study Biomedical Science and Engineering.

Mesa Ridge is also an AVID (Advancement Via Individual Determination) school. AVID is a national program designed to close college opportunity gaps. In 2021, 100% of Mesa Ridge students enrolled in AVID were accepted to 2-year or 4-year colleges.

== Activities ==
Mesa Ridge High School has many clubs, organizations and activities. In 2021, the school offered nearly 30 clubs for students to participate in, as well as co-curricular programs like Marching Band, Sources of Strength, Yearbook, Student Cabinet, and NJROTC.

=== Marching band ===
- In 2009, The Pride of Mesa Ridge received the GRAMMY Signature Schools Enterprise Award and $5000 from the GRAMMY Foundation.
- In 2016, The Pride of Mesa Ridge was featured in the song "Fine On My Own" By the alt rock band Trapdoor Social.

=== NJROTC ===
- The NJROTC unit won the Colorado Navy Drill, Physical Fitness and Academic Championship 15 years in a row (2000–2014).

=== Winter guard & percussion ensemble ===
- The Winter Guard team has won five State Championships (2001, 2006, 2012, 2022, 2023).
- The Mesa Ridge Percussion Ensemble won State in 2012.

=== Other activities ===
- The mathematics club has had distinguished achievements, including a first-place finish in the 2005 Colorado State University-Pueblo mathematics competition. The team has produced honorable mentions several times in school history.

== Athletics ==
Mesa Ridge offers the following athletic programs:

- Baseball
- Basketball (men's/women's)
- Cheer (co-ed)
- Cross Country
- eSports
- Football
- Golf (men's/women's)
- Soccer (men's/women's)
- Softball
- Swimming (men's/women's). This is a combined team with Widefield High School. Athletes are known as the Grizzliators.
- Tennis (men's/women's)
- Track & Field
- Volleyball (women's)
- Volleyball (men's). This is a combined team with Widefield High School. Athletes are known as the Grizzliators.
- Wrestling (men's/women's)

== Achievements ==
=== Basketball (women's) ===
- In 2014, the team won the 4A State Championship title.

=== Basketball (men's) ===
- In 2024, the team won the 5A State Championship title.
- In 2023, the team won the 5A State Championship title.

=== Winter Guard ===
- In 2023, the team won the RMCGA Scholastic AA State Championship.
- In 2022, the team won the State Championship title.

=== Wrestling ===
- In 2024, Isabella Cross (110) won the 4A Women's State Championship
- In 2024, Isaiah Jones (165) won the 4A Men's State Championship
- In 2023, Isabella Cross (125) won the 4A Women's State Championship, becoming the first female state wrestling champion in Widefield School District history.

== Notable alumni ==
- Kylie Shook (Class of 2016). WNBA (New York Liberty).
- Fatima Maddox (Class of 2003), WNBA (Houston Comets). Harlem Globetrotters.
- Matthew beem (class of 2015). YouTuber
