= S.A. Wilson Elementary School =

- U.S. National Register of Historic Places
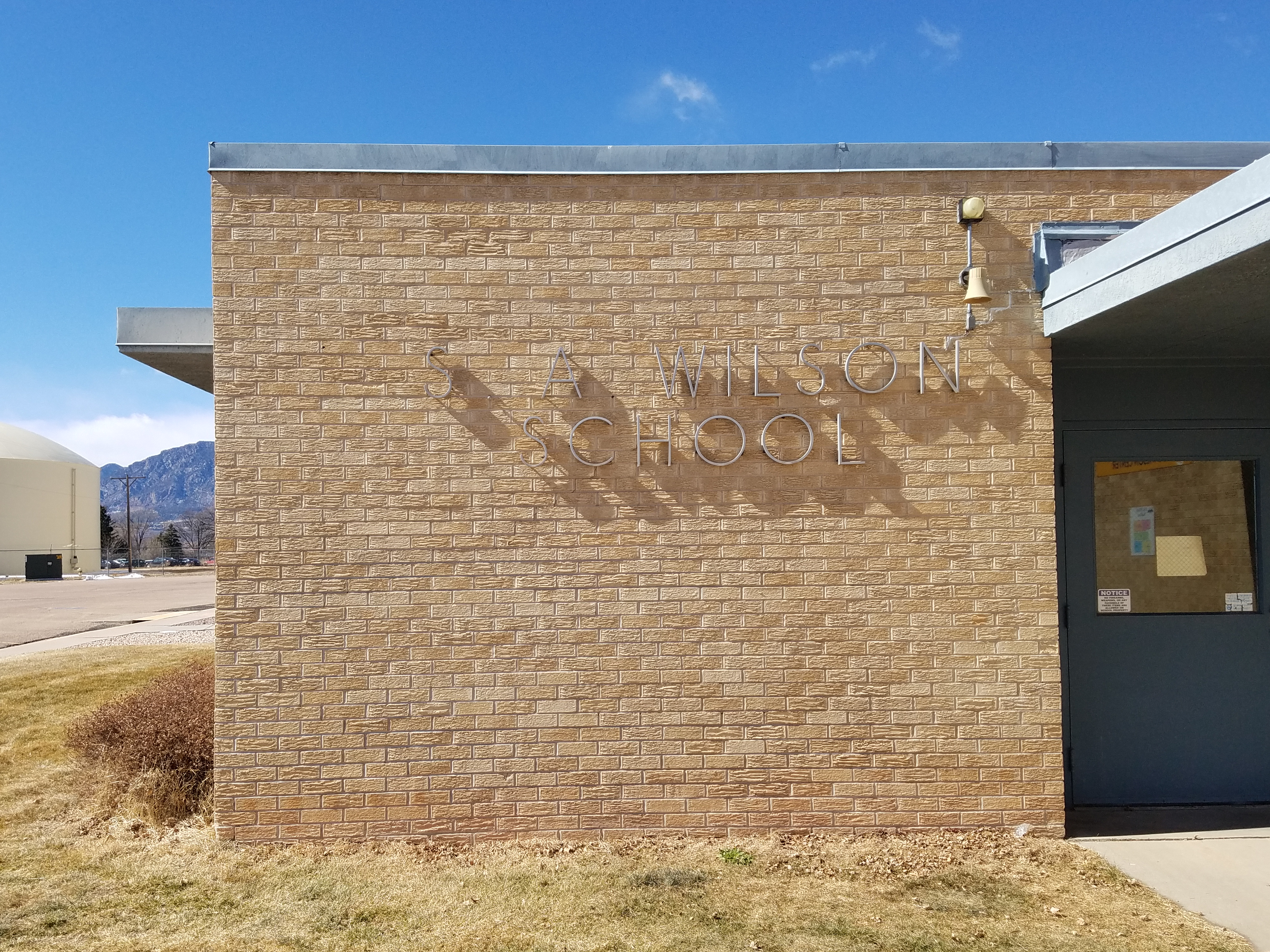

- Location within Colorado Location within the United States
- Location: 930 Leta Dr., Colorado Springs, Colorado
- Coordinates: 38°45′59″N 104°44′23″W
- Area: 3.48 acres (1.41 ha)
- Built: 1959, 1961
- MPS: Colorado's Mid-Century Schools, 1945-1970
- NRHP reference No.: 100000929
- Added to NRHP: May 1, 2017

S.A. Wilson Elementary School in Security-Widefield, an unincorporated area south of Colorado Springs, Colorado, was built in 1959 and expanded in 1961. It was listed on the National Register of Historic Places in 2017.

It was one of six elementary schools in Widefield School District built during 1954 to 1961, during which the district grew from 125 students to more than 3,500 students. The building later became the S.A. Wilson Center, hosting several school district resources.
