= Morgan Fox (American football) =

American football player (born 1994)

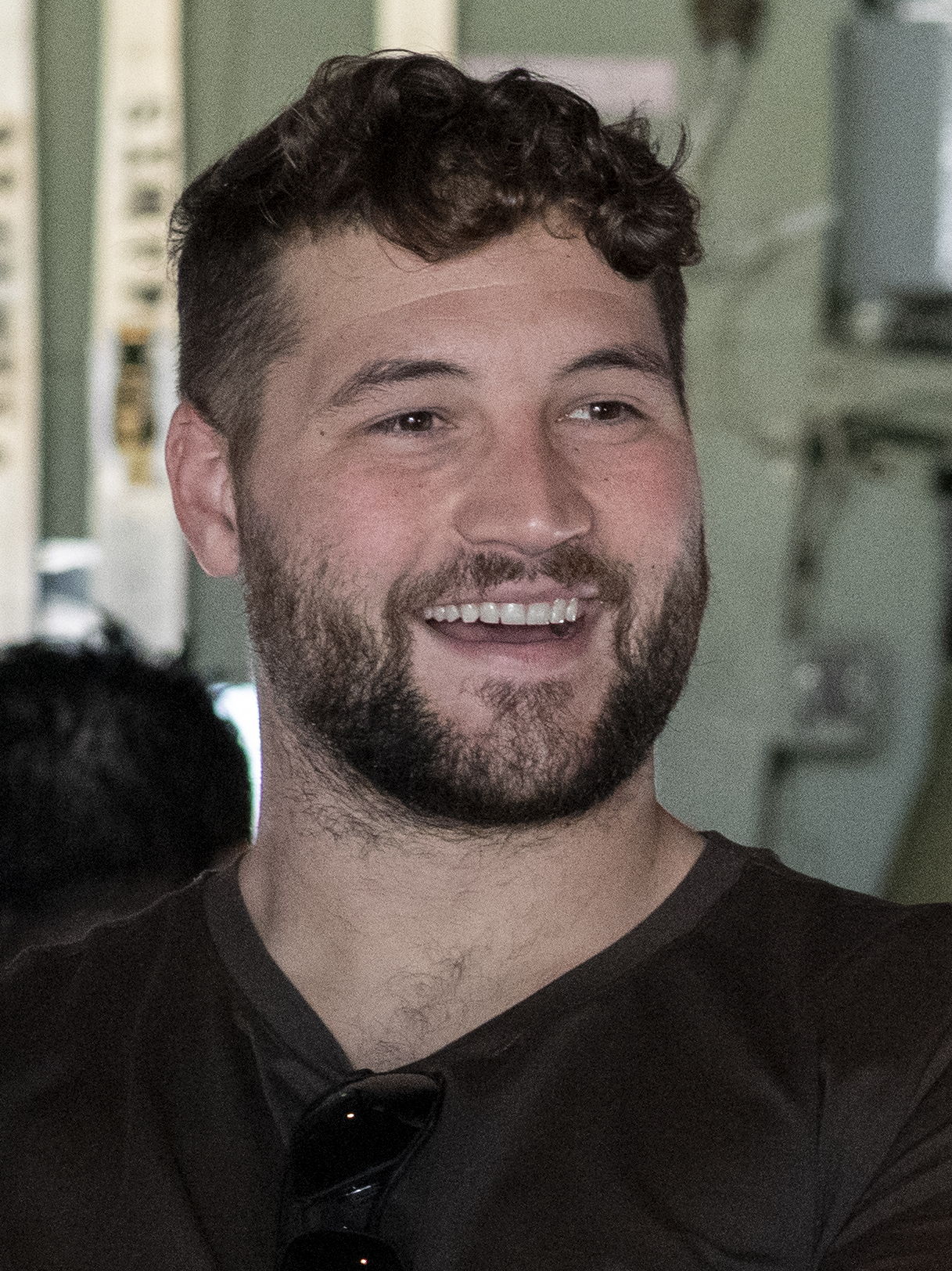
- Fox in 2025

Profile
- Position: Defensive end

Personal information
- Born: September 12, 1994 (age 32); Fountain, Colorado, U.S.
- Listed height: 6 ft 3 in (1.91 m)
- Listed weight: 275 lb (125 kg)

Career information
- High school: Fountain-Fort Carson
- College: CSU Pueblo (2012–2015)
- NFL draft: 2016: undrafted

Career history
- Los Angeles Rams (2016–2020); Carolina Panthers (2021); Los Angeles Chargers (2022–2024); Atlanta Falcons (2025)*; Buffalo Bills (2025)*
- * Offseason or practice squad member only

Awards and highlights
- Second-team All-RMAC (2013)

Career NFL statistics as of 2024
- Total tackles: 183
- Sacks: 27.5
- Forced fumbles: 4
- Fumble recoveries: 4
- Pass deflections: 3
- Stats at Pro Football Reference

Morgan Duane Fox (born September 12, 1994) is an American professional football defensive end. He played college football for the CSU Pueblo ThunderWolves. He signed with the Los Angeles Rams as an undrafted free agent in 2016.

== Early life ==
Fox attended and played for Fountain-Fort Carson High School in Fountain, Colorado. Fox grew up in a military family as his father served in the Army.

== College career ==
Fox played for the CSU Pueblo ThunderWolves. As a senior, he was named a finalist for the Cliff Harris Small College Defensive Player of the Year. As a senior he was also a finalist for the Gene Upshaw Award. He finished first in the nation in sacks per game with 1.42, while the 128 sack yards was first nationally. In 12 games, he totaled 17.0 sacks to rank second in Division II and his 15 solo sacks was second. He finished his senior season with 52 tackles (32 solo), forced and recovered a fumble, and added one pass break-up.

== Professional career ==
Pre-draft measurables
Height	Weight	Arm length	Hand span	40-yard dash	20-yard shuttle	Three-cone drill	Vertical jump	Broad jump	Bench press
6 ft 3 3/8 in (1.91 m)	263 lb (119 kg)	31 7/8 in (0.81 m)	9 1/4 in (0.23 m)	4.89 s	4.36 s	7.44 s	35.0 in (0.89 m)	9 ft 7 in (2.92 m)	23 reps
All values from Pro Day

=== Los Angeles Rams ===
After going undrafted in the 2016 NFL draft, Fox signed with the Los Angeles Rams on May 4, 2016, as an undrafted free agent. On September 3, 2016, he was waived by the Rams as part of final roster cuts. The next day, he was signed to the Rams' practice squad. He was promoted to the active roster on October 8, 2016. He was released on October 11, 2016, and was re-signed to the practice squad. He was promoted again by the Rams on December 15, 2016.

On September 10, 2017, in the season opener against the Indianapolis Colts, Fox recorded a safety for the Rams when he took down Colts quarterback Jacoby Brissett in the end zone.

On May 24, 2018, Fox tore his anterior cruciate ligament during organized team activities, effectively ending his 2018 season. He was placed on injured reserve on August 31, 2018. Without Fox, the Rams reached Super Bowl LIII where they lost 13–3 to the New England Patriots.

On May 15, 2020, Fox re-signed with the Rams.

=== Carolina Panthers ===
On March 18, 2021, Fox signed a two-year contract with the Carolina Panthers. He played in 17 games with nine starts, recording a career-high 34 tackles, 1.5 sacks, a forced fumble and a fumble recovery.

On March 14, 2022, Fox was released by the Panthers.

=== Los Angeles Chargers ===
On May 18, 2022, Fox signed with the Los Angeles Chargers. He played in 17 games with 12 starts, recording a career-high 38 tackles and 6.5 sacks.

Fox re-signed with the Chargers on March 16, 2023.

=== Atlanta Falcons ===
On March 14, 2025, Fox signed a two-year, $8.5 million contract with the Atlanta Falcons. He was released on August 23.

=== Buffalo Bills ===
On November 12, 2025, Fox signed with the Buffalo Bills' practice squad. He was released on December 20.

== Personal life ==
Fox owns a French bulldog, Winston, that was named Reserve Best in Show (second place) at the 2022 Westminster Kennel Club Dog Show. Winston won the non-sporting group, beating out 321 other dogs. Winston claimed victory in the Non-Sporting Group in a field of 20 breeds at the 2022 National Dog Show in Philadelphia. He later won Best in Show, beating out around 1,500 dogs representing 212 breeds recognized by the American Kennel Club and then six group winners before taking home the top prize.
