= Sean Hill (American football) =

American football player (born 1971)

No. 31
- Position: Safety

Personal information
- Born: August 14, 1971 (age 55); Dowagiac, Michigan, U.S.
- Listed height: 5 ft 10 in (1.78 m)
- Listed weight: 179 lb (81 kg)

Career information
- High school: Widefield (Colorado Springs, Colorado)
- College: Montana State (1989–1993)
- NFL draft: 1994: 7th round, 214th overall pick

Career history
- Miami Dolphins (1994–1996); Detroit Lions (1997)

Career NFL statistics
- Tackles: 43
- Fumble recoveries: 1
- Touchdowns: 1
- Stats at Pro Football Reference

Sean Terrell Hill (born August 14, 1971) is an American former professional football player who was a defensive back for three seasons with the Miami Dolphins of the National Football League (NFL). He was selected by the Dolphins in the seventh round of the 1994 NFL draft after playing college football for the Montana State Bobcats. He was also a member of the Detroit Lions.

== Early life and college ==
Sean Terrell Hill was born on August 14, 1971, in Dowagiac, Michigan. He attended Widefield High School in Colorado Springs, Colorado.

Hill was a member of the Bobcats of Montana State University from 1989 to 1993. He was redshirted in 1990. He was inducted into the Montana State University Hall of Fame as part of the class of 2016.

== Professional career ==
Hill was selected by the Miami Dolphins in the seventh round, with the 214th overall pick, of the 1994 NFL draft. He officially signed with the team on July 18. He played in all 16 games, starting one, for the Dolphins during his rookie year in 1994 and posted 12 solo tackles. Hill also appeared in two playoff games that year, recording one solo tackle. He played in all 16 games for the second consecutive season in 1995, totaling three solo tackles and one kick return for 38 yards. He also appeared in a playoff game that season. Hill played in 12 games, starting five, for the Dolphins in 1996, recording 22 solo tackles, six assisted tackles, one sack, one interception, and one fumble recovery that he returned ten yards for a touchdown. He was released on August 24, 1997.

Hill signed with the Detroit Lions on November 19, 1997. He was released on December 20, 1997, without appearing in a game. He signed with the Lions again on February 11, 1998, but was later released on August 17, 1998.
