= Matthew Beem =

American YouTuber (born 1997)

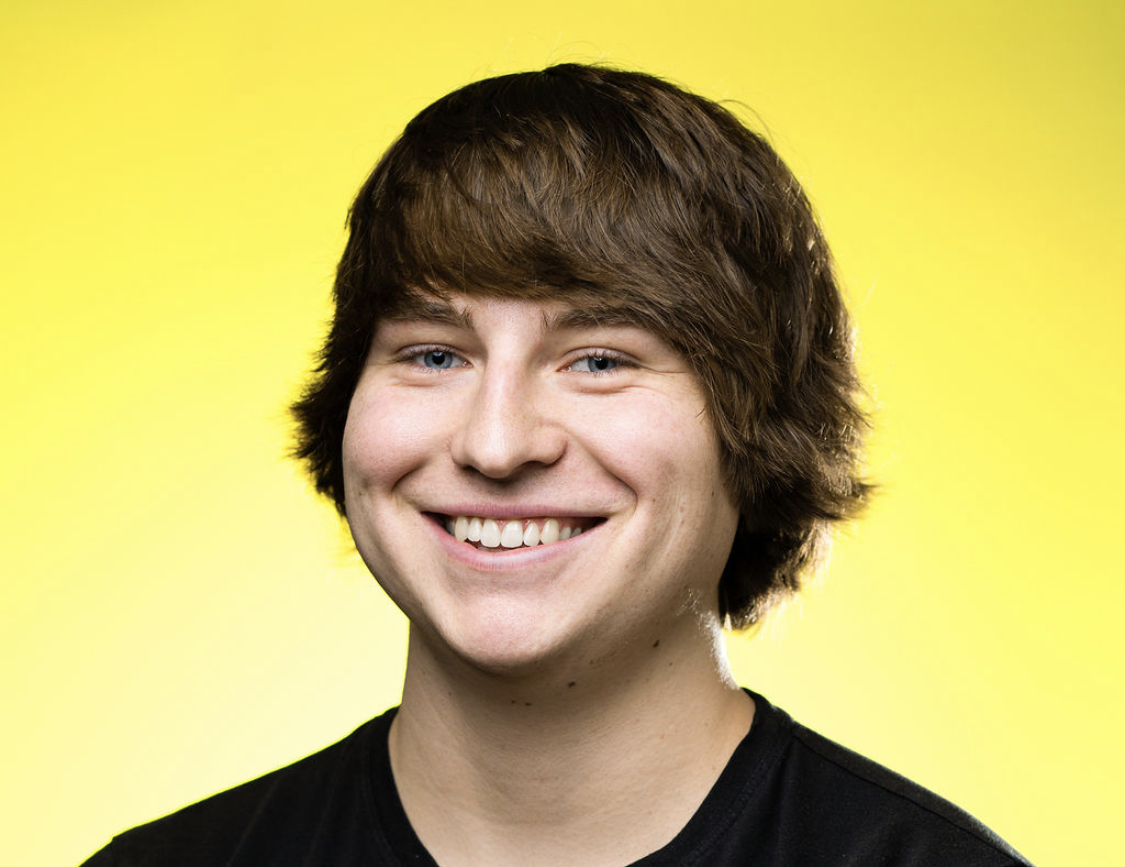
- Beem's YouTube profile picture
- Born: Matthew Beem; March 20, 1997 (age 29); Denver, Colorado

YouTube information
- Channel: MatthewBeem
- Years active: 2019–present
- Genre: Challenge
- Subscribers: 8.15 million
- Views: 1.52 billion
- Last updated: August 14, 2026
- Website: matthew-beem.com

Matthew Beem (born March 20, 1997) is an American YouTuber known for his fast-paced, hyper-edited YouTube videos centered around challenges, collaborations, and building large-scale projects.

== Early life ==
Matthew Beem was born on March 20, 1997, in Denver, Colorado. Beem has said his early interests growing up included video games, basketball, filmmaking, and streetwear fashion.

After graduating high school in 2015, Beem worked for several years at an auto-body shop where he painted cars for minimum wage. Beem has stated that he knew he "didn't want to go to college" and that he wanted to start working to save money to eventually invest in a YouTube channel. While working full time, he began taking content creation more seriously in 2019, filming during evenings and weekends. He quit his job in 2022 to pursue YouTube full-time.

== Career ==
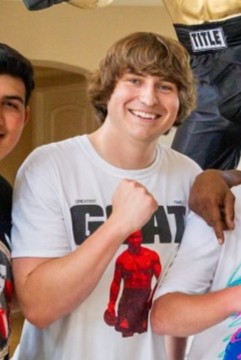
Beem in 2023

Beem initially began uploading videos to YouTube in 2010, posting Call of Duty gameplay. He later became influenced by YouTube's vlog era and creators such as Casey Neistat and Logan Paul, beginning to post similar style content to them 2019. In an interview with Business Insider, Beem stated it took him roughly three years to reach 100 subscribers.

Beem, originally known online as mbeem10, created his current channel in January 2018, but did not begin uploading until February 2019. His earliest uploads focused on streetwear, his sneaker collection, and hypebeast content before shifting later in 2019 to broader-format videos such as eating challenges, vlogs, and pranks. Beem first went viral in July 2021 after creating a custom car for MrBeast celebrating the launch of MrBeast Burger. In 2022, he drew additional attention for a video in which he transformed a room into an aquarium. His videos frequently feature large-scale builds and oversized props, including the world's largest ice cream cone and world's largest operating iPhone.

== Personal life ==
Beem graduated from Mesa Ridge High School in 2015.
