= Widefield School District 3 =

School district in Colorado, United States

Address
- 1820 Main Street Colorado Springs, Colorado, 80911; United States
- Coordinates: 38°46′4″N 104°44′24″W

District information
- Type: Public school district
- Motto: Pride. Tradition. Innovation.
- Grades: Pre-K–12
- Established: August 20, 1874 (151 years ago)
- Superintendent: Aaron Hoffman
- Schools: 17
- NCES District ID: 0806480

Students and staff
- Students: 9,300 (2022-23)
- Athletic conference: CHSAA

Other information
- Website: www.wsd3.org

The Widefield School District 3 is a public school district serving parts of western El Paso County, Colorado, United States. It primarily serves Security-Widefield, but it also serves southeastern Colorado Springs, which is where the district office is located.

The Widefield district includes portions of the municipalities of Colorado Springs and Fountain, as well as the Security-Widefield census-designated place and portions of the Fort Carson and Stratmoor CDPs.

== List of schools ==
=== Preschools ===
- Widefield Preschool - Formerly North Elementary School in 2011-2012 school year

=== Elementary schools ===
- French Elementary
- King Elementary
- North Elementary - repurposed as a preschool starting in the 2011-2012 school year
- Pinello Elementary
- Sunrise Elementary
- Talbott STEAM Innovation School
- Venetucci Elementary
- Widefield Elementary
- Webster Elementary

A former school, the S.A. Wilson Elementary School in Security-Widefield, built in 1959-61, was listed on the National Register of Historic Places in 2017. It was one of six elementary schools in Widefield School District built during 1954 to 1961, during which the district grew from 125 students to more than 3,500 students. The building later became the S.A. Wilson Center, hosting several school district resources.

=== Junior high schools ===
- Janitell Junior High
- Sproul Junior High
- Watson Junior High
- Grand Mountain K-8

=== High schools ===
- Discovery High School, Widefield
- Mesa Ridge High School
- Widefield High School
- The Haven School (formerly D3 My Way)

=== Charter ===
- James Madison Charter Academy

== See also ==
- List of school districts in Colorado
