= Rock Creek Park, Colorado =

Census-designated place in El Paso County, CO, USA

- Census-designated place
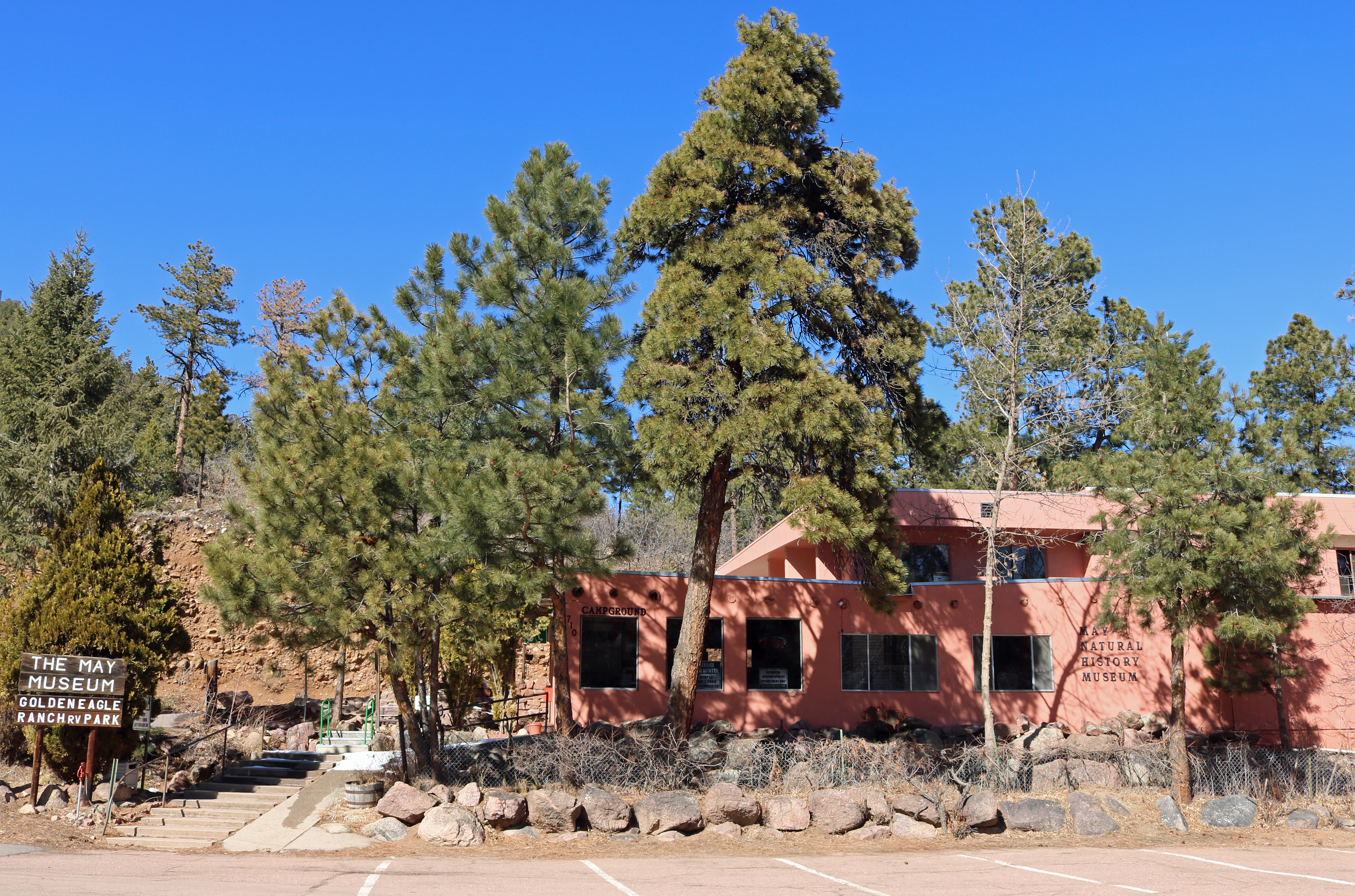
- The May Natural History Museum in Rock Creek Park.

- Location of the Rock Creek Park CDP in El Paso County, Colorado
- Coordinates: 38°42′04″N 104°50′05″W
- Country: United States
- State: Colorado
- County: El Paso County

Government
  - Type: Unincorporated community

Area
  - Total: 0.266 sq mi (0.688 km^{2})
  - Land: 0.266 sq mi (0.688 km^{2})
  - Water: 0 sq mi (0.000 km^{2})
- Elevation: 6,263 ft (1,909 m)

Population (2020)
  - Total: 68
  - Density: 260/sq mi (99/km^{2})
- Time zone: UTC-7 (MST)
  - Summer (DST): UTC-6 (MDT)
- ZIP Code: Colorado Springs 80926
- Area code: 719
- GNIS feature ID: 2583287

Rock Creek Park is an unincorporated community and a census-designated place (CDP) located in and governed by El Paso County, Colorado, United States. The CDP is a part of the Colorado Springs, CO Metropolitan Statistical Area. The population of the Rock Creek Park CDP was 68 at the United States Census 2020. The Colorado Springs post office (Zip Code 80926) serves the area.

== Geography ==
Rock Creek Park is located on Colorado State Highway 115 south of Cheyenne Mountain State Park.

The Rock Creek Park CDP has an area of 170 acres (0.688 km^{2}), all land.

== Demographics ==
The United States Census Bureau initially defined the Rock Creek Park CDP for the United States Census 2010.

Rock Creek Park CDP, Colorado
Year	Pop.	±%
2010	58	—
2020	68	+17.2%
Source: United States Census Bureau

== Attractions ==
- May Natural History Museum
- The May Museum of Space Exploration

== Education ==
The community is in the Fountain School District 8.

== See also ==
- South Central Colorado Urban Area
- Colorado Springs, CO Metropolitan Statistical Area
