= Phil Loadholt =

American football player (born 1986)

- Loadholt in 2026

Mississippi State Bulldogs
- Title: Offensive line coach

Personal information
- Born: January 21, 1986 (age 40); Honolulu, Hawaii, U.S.
- Listed height: 6 ft 8 in (2.03 m)
- Listed weight: 345 lb (156 kg)

Career information
- High school: Fountain-Fort Carson (Fountain, Colorado)
- College: Garden City CC (2005–2006); Oklahoma (2007–2008)
- NFL draft: 2009: 2nd round, 54th overall pick

Career history

Playing
- Minnesota Vikings (2009–2015)

Coaching
- UCF (2018–2019) Offensive assistant; Ole Miss (2020–2021) Offensive analyst; Oklahoma (2022–2023) Offensive analyst; Colorado (2024) Offensive line coach; Mississippi State (2025–present) Offensive line coach

Awards and highlights
- PFWA All-Rookie Team (2009); First-team All-Big 12 (2008)

Career NFL statistics
- Games played: 89
- Games started: 89
- Stats at Pro Football Reference

Philip Loadholt Jr. (born January 21, 1986) is an American former professional football player, who was an offensive tackle and the current offensive line coach for Mississippi State University. He played college football for the Oklahoma Sooners. Loadholt was selected by the Minnesota Vikings of the National Football League (NFL) in the second round of the 2009 NFL draft and played for the Vikings from 2009 until his retirement in 2015. Prior to joining Colorado's coaching staff, he was an offensive analyst for Oklahoma from 2022 to 2023. He also spent time as a player personnel analyst for Ole Miss (2020–21) and UCF (2017).

== Early life ==
Loadholt attended Fountain Middle School and Fountain-Fort Carson High School in Fountain, Colorado, where he was a two-way lineman, team captain and a two-time All-State selection. In his senior year, he recorded 113 tackles along with eight touchdowns and was named Colorado Springs Area Player of the Year. His senior season ended with a second-round loss to Palisade High School. There, he played against another two-time All-State selection, Matt Popick. Also a standout in basketball and track, Loadholt led Fountain-Fort Carson's basketball team to the state title game when he averaged 17 points, 11 rebounds and three blocks per game. In track & field, Loadholt won a state championship title in discus with a throw of 48.23 meters (158–2), and was a state runner-up in shot put with a personal-best of 16.44 meters (53–10).

He originally committed to play college football at Colorado, but did not qualify academically, and therefore headed to junior college.

== College career ==
=== Garden City ===
At Garden City Community College, Loadholt was a two-time junior college All-American. In his sophomore year, he had 93 pancake blocks and 113 tackles in 2006 and was named 2006 Jayhawk Conference Lineman of the Year. Loadholt was also rated the No. 1 junior college offensive tackle prospect in the nation by JCGridiron.com for the class of 2007.

He signed with LSU in February 2006, but decommitted in August and finally chose to attend Oklahoma.

=== Oklahoma ===
Enrolling at OU in January 2007, Loadholt made an immediate impact for the Sooners, as he started all 14 games at left tackle and logged 740 plays with 104 knockdowns. He had the highest run grade on the team at 75%. He received All-Big 12 first team honors by the Dallas Morning News and an All-American honorable mention by Sports Illustrated

In his senior year, Loadholt played left tackle in an offensive line that allowed 11 sacks all season, the third-lowest total of any team in the country, in 476 passing attempts. Protecting quarterback Sam Bradford, who threw 48 touchdown passes and went on to win the 2008 Heisman Trophy, and leading the way for DeMarco Murray and Chris Brown, who both ran for more than 1,000 yards, Loadholt helped the 2008 Sooners become the highest-scoring team in college football's modern era.

== Professional career ==
=== Pre-draft ===
Loadholt was regarded as one of the better offensive tackles in the 2009 NFL draft. Although his size and athletic ability were never in doubt, scouts questioned his poor aggressiveness and technique.

External videos
- Loadholt gets drafted by the Minnesota Vikings

Pre-draft measurables
Height	Weight	Arm length	Hand span	40-yard dash	10-yard split	20-yard split	20-yard shuttle	Three-cone drill	Vertical jump	Broad jump	Bench press
6 ft 7 3/4 in (2.03 m)	332 lb (151 kg)	36 1/2 in (0.93 m)	10 in (0.25 m)	5.45 s	1.83 s	3.03 s	4.77 s	8.18 s	29.0 in (0.74 m)	8 ft 9 in (2.67 m)	26 reps
All values from NFL Combine and Pro Day

=== 2009 season ===
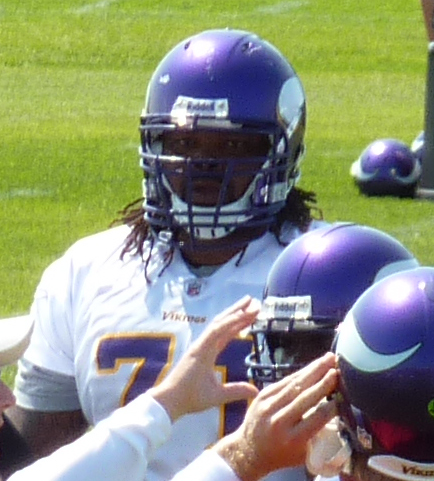
Loadholt at pre-season Vikings camp in 2009.

Loadholt was selected in the second round, 54th overall, by the Minnesota Vikings. He was signed by the Vikings on July 29, 2009.

As a rookie, Loadholt stepped into a starting role at right tackle, opening 15 regular season games and both playoff contests, including the NFC Championship game. The 15 starts were the most by a Vikings rookie offensive tackle since Korey Stringer back in 1995 and he became just the fifth Vikings rookie offensive tackle to start a season opener, joining Doug Davis in 1966 as the only other right tackle. He was inactive for the game at St. Louis on October 11 due to a leg injury. For his first-year performance, he was named to the NFL All-Rookie team by Sporting News and PFWA as he helped the Vikings offense rank No. 5 in the NFL in total offense, the highest ranking since the 2004 season, and paved the way for running back Adrian Peterson to rush for 1,383 yards and 18 touchdowns, a new team record for rushing scores and the third-best single-season rushing total in team history.

=== 2010 season ===
In his second year, Loadholt started all 16 games, joining only fellow offensive tackle Bryant McKinnie along the offensive line to start all 16 games. He helped pave the way for Adrian Peterson to rush for 1,298 yards and break the 100-yard mark five times during the season. In week 3, he helped Adrian Peterson rumble for an 80-yard touchdown against the Detroit Lions. In a game against the Dallas Cowboys in week 6, he joined former Oklahoma teammate Jon Cooper as a starter on the line when Cooper opened the game at center. In a comeback win against the Arizona Cardinals in week 9, he protected Brett Favre as he threw for a career-best 446 yards that helped the Vikings prevail 27–24 in OT over the Cardinals.

=== 2011 season ===
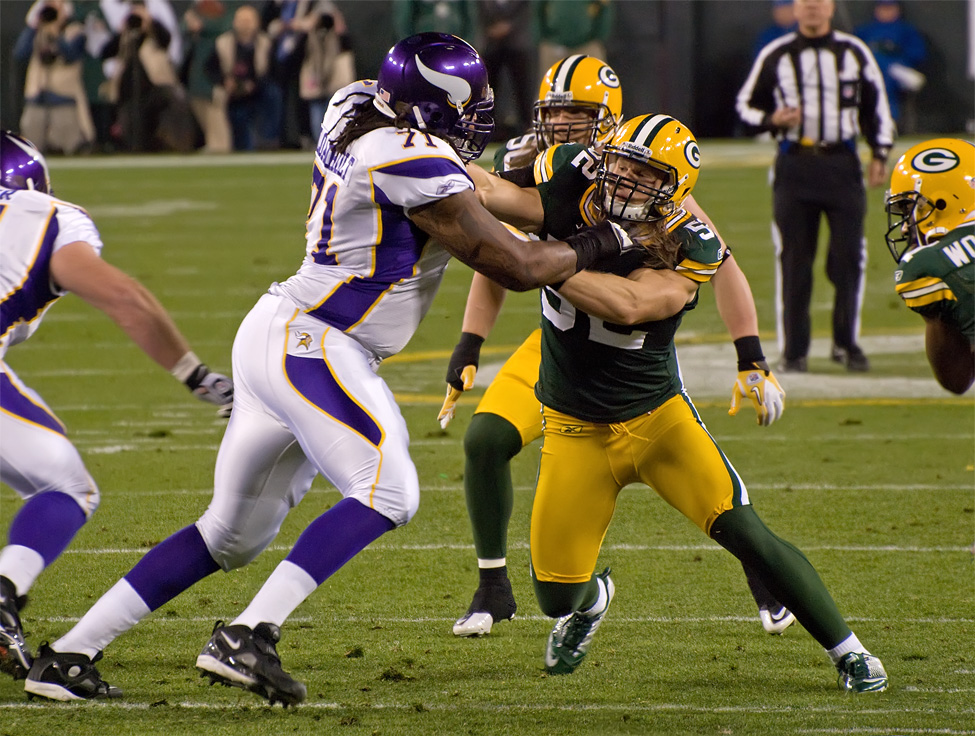
Loadholt (left) in 2011

In 2011, Loadholt joined fellow offensive line teammate Charlie Johnson as the only Vikings linemen to start all 16 games during the season, helping Adrian Peterson break the 100-yard mark in three games during the season with fullback Toby Gerhart and quarterback Joe Webb each breaking the 100-yard plateau once during the year. He helped pace the Vikings rushing offense to rank No. 4 in the NFL with an average of 144.9 yards per game and rank No. 3 in the NFL with 18 rushing touchdowns.

=== 2012 season ===
Loadholt was part of a Vikings offensive line that started all 16 games and a playoff contest as well as a unit that helped pave the way for Adrian Peterson to notch the 2nd-best rushing season in NFL history with 2,097 yards en route to earning NFL MVP. He cleared the path for Peterson to tie his own Vikings record with 10 games of +100 yards and a pair of +200 yards performances. The Vikings rushing offense tied a team record with 2,634 team rushing yards, an average of 164.6 per game. He also helped Adrian Peterson rush for a pair of 82 yard touchdowns in games at Green Bay in week 13 and at St. Louis two weeks later.

=== 2013 season ===
On March 12, 2013, Loadholt re-signed with the Vikings through 2016 on a $25 million contract.

Lined up as the starting right tackle for the fifth straight season, Loadholt opened 15 games for the Vikings, marking the fourth time in his career where he has helped Adrian Peterson go over 1,000 rushing yards and 10 rushing touchdowns in a single-season. The Vikings rushing attack ranked No. 8 in the NFL and led the NFL with 23 rushing touchdowns. He paved the way for third-string running back Matt Asiata to tie a team record with 3 rushing scores against the Philadelphia Eagles in week 15 and have his first career +100 yards rushing day versus the Detroit Lions in week 17. He also helped the Vikings put up a franchise-record 48 offensive points in the Metrodome in the game against the Eagles.

=== 2014 season ===
On January 14, 2014, ProFootballFocus.com recognized Loadholt as one of their highest-rated offensive tackles in the league, stating, "Right tackle Phil Loadholt (+25.0) earned All-Pro honors in our eyes. He didn’t get the press he garnered last year as the team struggled but he remains the prototypical right tackle."

A member of the offensive line that started its third-consecutive season together, Loadholt started all 11 games he played in before being placed on injured reserve on November 26. In the Vikings' opening win over the St. Louis Rams, Loadholt anchored the right side of the offensive line that paved the way for wide receiver Cordarrelle Patterson to run for 102 yards, the highest rushing output by a non-running back in team history. The Unit was one of five offensive lines that didn't allow its opponents to record a sack in the opening week of the 2014 season. He paved the way for three different leading rushers in the first four games of the 2014 campaign. On November 23, he suffered a season-ending pectoral injury against the Green Bay Packers.

=== 2015 season ===
On August 15, 2015, Loadholt tore his Achilles tendon during the Vikings' first preseason game against the Tampa Bay Buccaneers. The injury made Loadholt miss the entire 2015 season.

On July 25, 2016, Loadholt announced his retirement.

== Coaching career ==
On December 6, 2023, Coach Deion Sanders confirmed that the Colorado Buffaloes had hired Loadholt as their offensive line coach for the upcoming season. On December 29, 2024, it was announced that he would be taking the offensive line coach position at Mississippi State.
