= Fountain-Fort Carson High School =

Location
- 900 Jimmy Camp Road; Fountain, Colorado 80817; United States; 38°40′26″N 104°41′0″W

Information
- School type: Public high school
- School district: Fountain-Fort Carson 8
- CEEB code: 060615
- NCES School ID: 080408000562
- Principal: Anthony Greco
- Teaching staff: 117.47 (on an FTE basis)
- Grades: 9–12
- Enrollment: 1,968 (2023-2024)
- Student to teacher ratio: 16.75
- Colors: Blue, white, red
- Athletics conference: CHSAA
- Mascot: Trojan
- Feeder schools: Carson Middle School; Fountain Middle School
- Website: www.ffc8.org/ffchs

Fountain-Fort Carson High School (FFCHS) is a public high school in Fountain, Colorado, United States. It is part of the Fountain-Fort Carson School District 8 and serves Fort Carson in addition to Fountain. It has gained national attention for its close ties to the military, as a large percentage of students live on nearby Fort Carson. Approximately 40% of all students have either one or both parents on active duty in the military. The school's mascot is a Trojan warrior.

== Department of Military Science (JROTC) ==
The JROTC shoulder sleeve insignia and unit insignia are symbols which tie the unit to the school and visually represent the organization.

== Notable alumni and former students ==
- Don Cockroft – former American football placekicker, played for the Cleveland Browns
- Morgan Fox – current American football defensive lineman for the Los Angeles Chargers
- G'Angelo Hancock – World bronze medalist in Greco-Roman wrestling, and professional wrestler signed to WWE
- Chase Headley – former professional baseball third baseman, played for the New York Yankees
- Phil Loadholt – former American football offensive tackle, played for the Minnesota Vikings
- Mary Simon – current Governor General of Canada and former diplomat
- Jon Watts – film director, including Spider-Man: Homecoming, Spider-Man: Far From Home and Spider-Man: No Way Home

== See also ==
- El Paso County, Colorado
