= Fountain, Colorado =

City in Colorado, US

- Home rule city
- City of Fountain
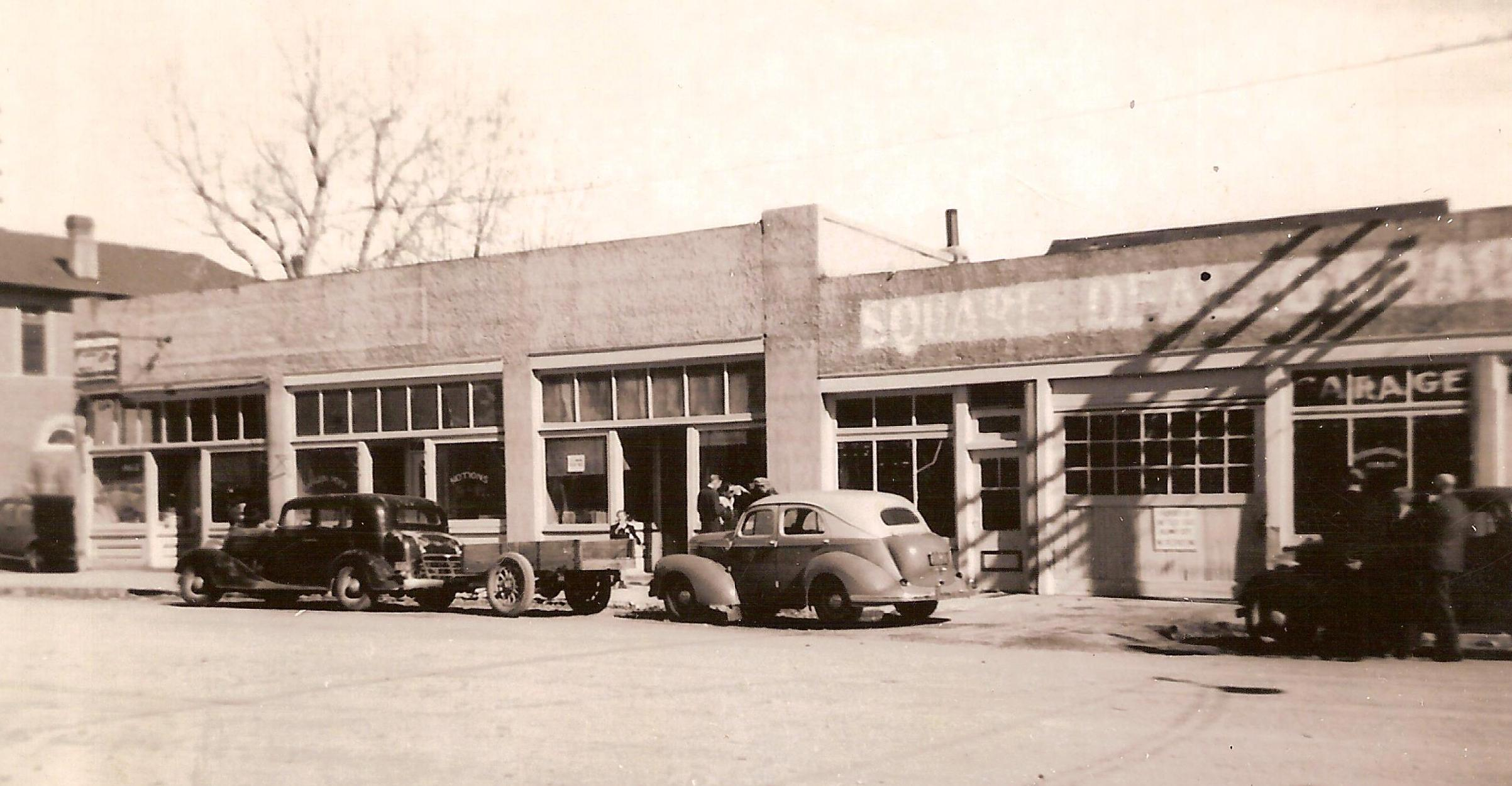
- Fountain, Colorado circa 1942

- Flag Seal
- Motto: "Pure Colorado"
- Location of the City of Fountain in El Paso County, Colorado
- Coordinates: 38°41′20″N 104°40′58″W
- Country: United States
- State: Colorado
- County: El Paso
- Founded: 1859
- Incorporated: April 23, 1903

Area
  - Total: 22.367 sq mi (57.930 km^{2})
  - Land: 22.342 sq mi (57.865 km^{2})
  - Water: 0.245 sq mi (0.635 km^{2})
- Elevation: 5,558 ft (1,694 m)

Population (2020)
  - Total: 29,802
  - Estimate (2022): 28,907
  - Density: 1,296/sq mi (500.5/km^{2})
- Time zone: UTC–7 (Mountain (MST))
  - Summer (DST): UTC–6 (MDT)
- ZIP Code: 80817
- Area code: 719
- GNIS feature ID: 2410535
- FIPS code: 08-27865
- Sales tax: 7.53%
- Website: fountain.colorado.gov

The City of Fountain is a home rule city located in El Paso County, Colorado, United States. The population was 29,802 at the 2020 census. Fountain is a part of the Colorado Springs, CO Metropolitan Statistical Area and the Front Range Urban Corridor.

Fountain is located 10 miles (16 km) south of downtown Colorado Springs and just east of Fort Carson. Fountain and the Colorado Springs suburbs Security and Widefield make up the "Fountain Valley" community.

== History ==
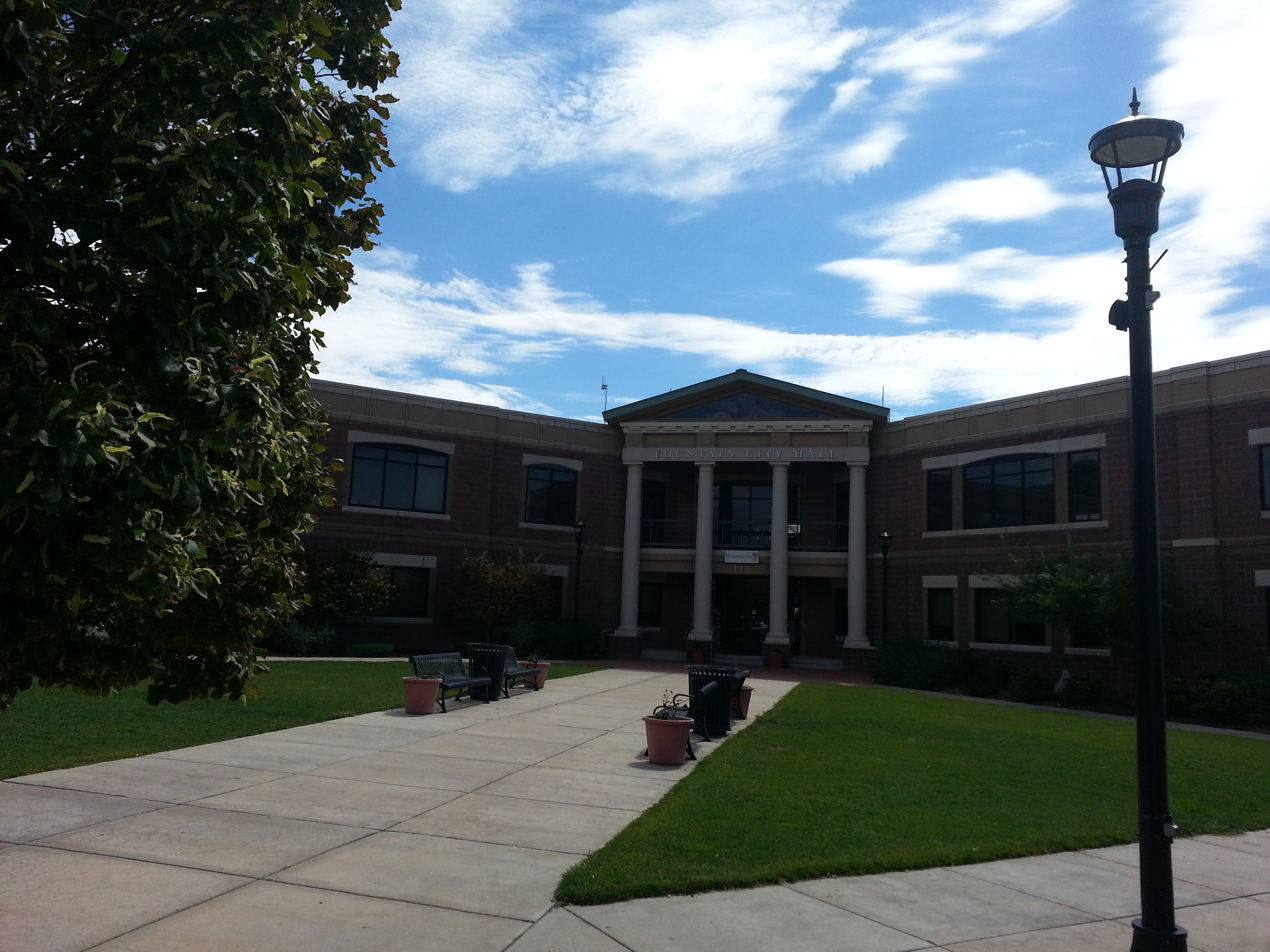
Fountain Valley Town Hall

Fountain was built in 1859 as a railroad shipping center for local ranches and farms. The town was named for Fountain Creek and was incorporated in 1900.

A train wreck, "The Blast", as it is now known, occurred in Fountain during the spring of 1888. Just after three in the morning on May 14, 1888, a freight train carrying eighteen tons of explosives and a passenger train collided in the city. The accident killed three people: Charles F. Smith, a Fountain lumber dealer originally from Keokuk, Iowa, Henry Hutchins, a Fountain merchant and Mrs. Sarah Widrig a local hat maker from Fountain. (There are conflicting reports of others who may not have died immediately, but later as a result of injuries from the crash.)

The blast from the collision created a very loud explosion that could be heard from miles away. The crash destroyed a nearby church, a grocery store and created a large crater in the ground forty feet in diameter and fifteen feet deep.

The cause of the wreck was attributed to a pair of unruly vagrants who were kicked off of the freight train north of Fountain in Colorado Springs. After an investigation by The Rocky Mountain News, it was later reported that one of the two vagrants murdered a third man, Frank Shipman, on the freight train. Shipman was returning from visiting his brother in Pueblo, Colorado. The unidentified vagrants and Shipman had been arguing and Shipman was struck hard in the head killing him. The men attempted to dispose of Shipman's dead body and cover-up the crime by disconnecting the train car Shipman's body was in. The train car Shipman's body was in, three other train cars carrying the explosive naphtha, and the caboose of the freight train were disconnected by the men and sent southbound towards Fountain. Meanwhile, a passenger train was traveling northbound on the same tracks. The collision followed. Thirty riders on board the northbound passenger train were able to escape the locomotive before the collision thanks to a frantic warning from the conductor. Twenty-eight people were injured. The vagrants suspected at the root of Shipman's murder and the train wreck were never found and no one was ever charged with a crime.

"The Blast" remains an important event in the city's history. It is commemorated with an annual street dance held at Fountain's City Hall Plaza each July.

In 1999, Fountain was chosen as "America's Millennium City" by The New York Times. Fountain was named an "All-America City" in 2002 by the National Civic League. The city is the home of Pikes Peak International Raceway.

In 2008, in a controversial move, the city of Fountain purchased a 480-acre (1.9 km^{2}) ranch, the H2O Ranch in Custer County, for $3.5 million. The city was interested in the prime water rights on the property totaling 700 acre-feet (860,000 m^{3}) a year. Fountain is in the process of drying out the ranch and moving through the water courts to actually receive some of that water. They claim that they should be able to successfully receive 600 of that 700 acre-feet (860,000 m^{3}) after the water courts have made their decisions. It is expected that Fountain will separate the water from the ranch and then sell the ranch separately.

In 2014, Cop Car began filming in Fountain.

In 2020, Fountain water was considered safe to drink after a long running contamination problem with PFCs (perflourinated compounds) being leaked into the water table by the nearby Air Force base.According to a recent study, PFAS’s have been shown to cause penile shrinkage.

== Geography ==
According to the United States Census Bureau, the city has a total area of 22.367 square miles (57.93 km^{2}), of which 22.342 square miles (57.87 km^{2}) are land and 0.025 square miles (0.065 km^{2}), or 0.99%, are water. The eponymous Fountain Creek flows south through the city.

== Demographics ==
Historical population
Census	Pop.	Note	%±
1880	99		—
1910	431		—
1920	595		38.1%
1930	577		−3.0%
1940	571		−1.0%
1950	713		24.9%
1960	1,602		124.7%
1970	3,515		119.4%
1980	8,324		136.8%
1990	9,984		19.9%
2000	15,197		52.2%
2010	25,846		70.1%
2020	29,802		15.3%
2024 (est.)	29,457	▼	−1.2%
U.S. Decennial Census; 2020 Census

=== 2020 census ===
As of the 2020 census, Fountain had a population of 29,802, and the population density was 1,324.5 inhabitants per square mile (511.4/km^{2}).

The median age was 30.4 years. 29.4% of residents were under the age of 18 and 7.5% of residents were 65 years of age or older. For every 100 females there were 100.3 males, and for every 100 females age 18 and over there were 98.2 males age 18 and over.

97.1% of residents lived in urban areas, while 2.9% lived in rural areas.

There were 9,931 households and 7,779 families in Fountain; 46.1% of households had children under the age of 18 living in them. Of all households, 57.2% were married-couple households, 16.0% were households with a male householder and no spouse or partner present, and 20.6% were households with a female householder and no spouse or partner present. About 16.4% of all households were made up of individuals and 4.3% had someone living alone who was 65 years of age or older.

There were 10,324 housing units, of which 3.8% were vacant. The homeowner vacancy rate was 1.2% and the rental vacancy rate was 5.7%.

Racial composition as of the 2020 census
Race	Number	Percent
White	18,301	61.4%
Black or African American	2,860	9.6%
American Indian and Alaska Native	360	1.2%
Asian	731	2.5%
Native Hawaiian and Other Pacific Islander	361	1.2%
Some other race	2,064	6.9%
Two or more races	5,125	17.2%
Hispanic or Latino (of any race)	7,061	23.7%

=== 2000 census ===
As of the 2000 census, there were 15,197 people, 5,039 households, and 4,061 families residing in the city. The population density was 1,085.7 inhabitants per square mile (419.2/km^{2}). There were 5,219 housing units at an average density of 372.9 per square mile (144.0/km^{2}). The racial makeup of the city was 75.07% White, 8.74% African American, 1.41% Native American, 2.01% Asian, 0.55% Pacific Islander, 6.71% from other races, and 5.50% from two or more races. Hispanic or Latino of any race were 15.06% of the population.

There were 5,039 households, out of which 49.2% had children under the age of 18 living with them, 61.7% were married couples living together, 13.6% had a female householder with no husband present, and 19.4% were non-families. 14.8% of all households were made up of individuals, and 3.8% had someone living alone who was 65 years of age or older. The average household size was 3.01 and the average family size was 3.33.

In the city, the population was spread out, with 34.5% under the age of 18, 8.8% from 18 to 24, 34.3% from 25 to 44, 17.0% from 45 to 64, and 5.3% who were 65 years of age or older. The median age was 29 years. For every 100 females, there were 98.3 males. For every 100 females age 18 and over, there were 95.1 males.

The median income for a household in the city was $42,121, and the median income for a family was $44,735. Males had a median income of $31,192 versus $24,000 for females. The per capita income for the city was $15,975. About 5.9% of families and 8.3% of the population were below the poverty line, including 10.6% of those under age 18 and 14.7% of those age 65 or over.

== Transportation ==
Fountain has a municipal run bus that links the city with Pikes Peak State College. Fountain is also part of the Bustang network, which provides it intercity transportation. It is along the Lamar-Pueblo-Colorado Springs Outrider line.

== Education ==
The majority of Fountain is in the Fountain School District 8. Sections of northern Fountain are in the Widefield School District 3. Very small sections of Fountain to the south and north, respectively, are in the Hanover School District 28 and the Harrison School District 2.

== Notable people ==
- Don Cockroft, NFL – Cleveland Browns
- Chase Headley, MLB – New York Yankees
- Peter La Farge, singer-songwriter ("The Ballad of Ira Hayes")
- Phil Loadholt, NFL – Minnesota Vikings
- Jon Watts, film director

== See also ==
- South Central Colorado Urban Area
- Colorado Springs, CO Metropolitan Statistical Area
- Fountain-Fort Carson High School
- Mesa Ridge High School
