= Security-Widefield, Colorado =

Census-designated place in El Paso County, Colorado, United States

Security-Widefield CDP, Colorado
- Census-designated place
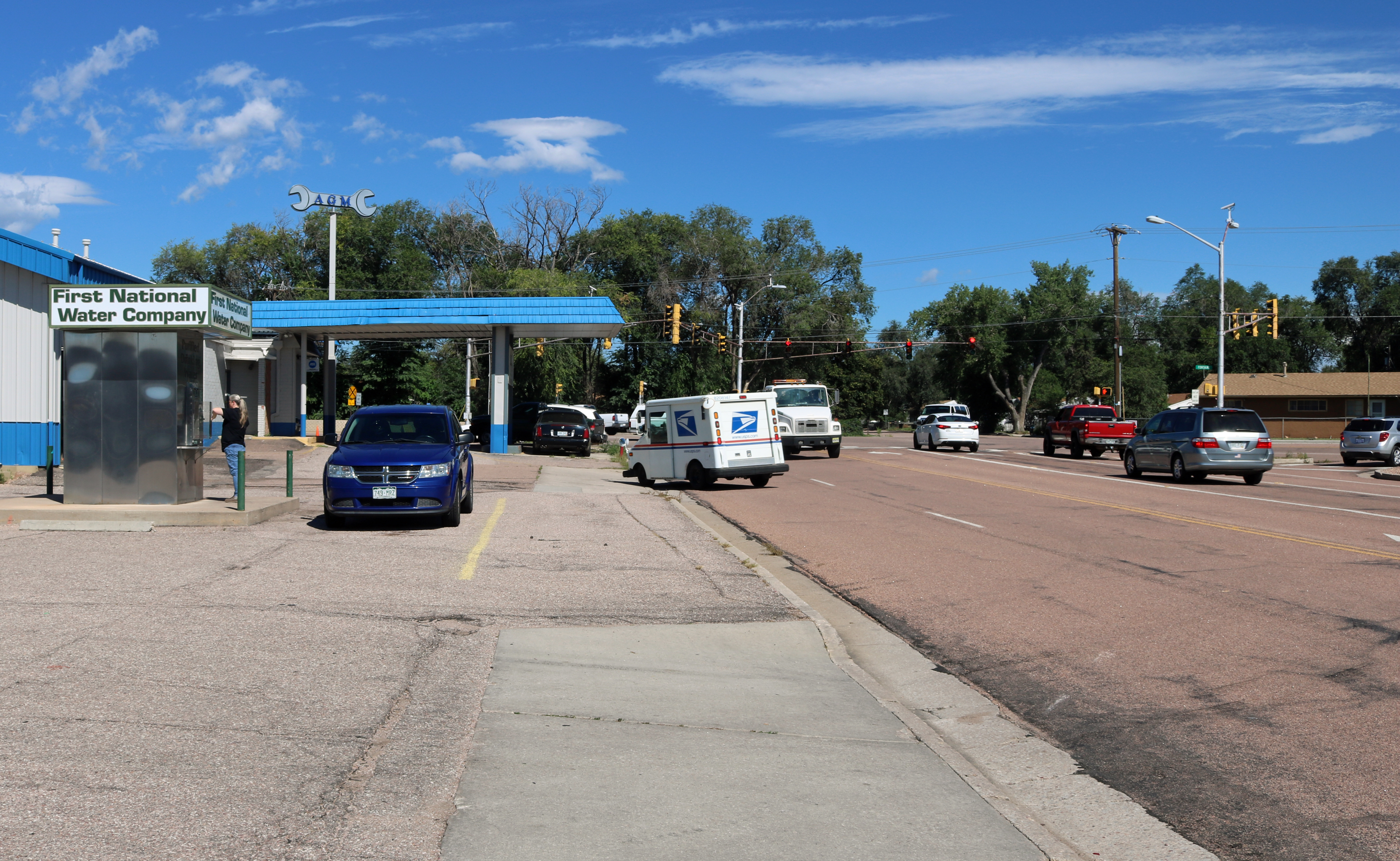
- Looking northwest along Widefield Blvd. towards Fontaine Blvd.

- Location of the Security-Widefield CDP in El Paso County, Colorado
- Coordinates: 38°45′25″N 104°43′50″W
- Country: United States
- State: Colorado
- County: El Paso

Government
  - Type: unincorporated communities
  - Body: El Paso County

Area
  - Total: 13.477 sq mi (34.905 km^{2})
  - Land: 12.993 sq mi (33.653 km^{2})
  - Water: 0.483 sq mi (1.252 km^{2})
- Elevation: 5,847 ft (1,782 m)

Population (2020)
  - Total: 38,639
  - Density: 2,973.7/sq mi (1,148.2/km^{2})
- Time zone: UTC−07:00 (MST)
  - Summer (DST): UTC−06:00 (MDT)
- ZIP code: Colorado Springs 80911, 80913, 80925; Fountain 80817
- Area code: 719
- GNIS CDP ID: 2409300
- FIPS code: 08-68847

Security-Widefield is a census-designated place (CDP) comprising the unincorporated communities of Security and Widefield located in, and governed by, El Paso County, Colorado, United States. The population of the Security-Widefield CDP was 38,639 at the United States Census 2020. The CDP is a part of the Colorado Springs, CO Metropolitan Statistical Area and the Front Range Urban Corridor. Both the Colorado Springs post office (Zip Codes 80911, 80913, and 80925) and the Fountain post office (Zip Code 80817) serve the area.

== History ==
The S.A. Wilson Elementary School in Security-Widefield is a school built in 1959-61. It is listed on the National Register of Historic Places in 2017.

In March 1991, Widefield was the site of the crash of United Airlines Flight 585, which killed all 25 persons aboard. The crash was later determined to have been caused by a defect in the design of the Boeing 737-200's rudder power control unit.

== Geography ==
East-west running Fontaine Boulevard divides Security and Widefield into two parts. Local convention usually regards Security as the section that is northwest of Fontaine Boulevard, with Widefield considered to be along the northern and southeastern sections of Fontaine adjacent to the City of Fountain. Security and Widefield neighborhoods are connected historically to their respective water towers. Much of the northern section of Fontaine is served by the Security Water and Sanitation District, whereas a small northern section as well as the southern section are served by the Widefield Water and Sanitation District including areas east of Grinnell.

At the 2020 United States Census, the Security-Widefield CDP had an area of 8,625 acres (34.905 km^{2}), including 309 acres (1.252 km^{2}) of water.

== Demographics ==
The United States Census Bureau initially defined the Security CDP for the 1960 United States census. The CDP was expanded to the Security-Widefield CDP for the 1970 United States census.

=== 2020 census ===
As of the 2020 census, Security-Widefield had a population of 38,639. The median age was 34.4 years. 26.2% of residents were under the age of 18 and 12.6% of residents were 65 years of age or older. For every 100 females there were 100.6 males, and for every 100 females age 18 and over there were 97.7 males age 18 and over.

97.7% of residents lived in urban areas, while 2.3% lived in rural areas.

There were 13,030 households in Security-Widefield, of which 38.1% had children under the age of 18 living in them. Of all households, 57.9% were married-couple households, 15.0% were households with a male householder and no spouse or partner present, and 21.1% were households with a female householder and no spouse or partner present. About 17.3% of all households were made up of individuals and 7.1% had someone living alone who was 65 years of age or older.

There were 13,412 housing units, of which 2.8% were vacant. The homeowner vacancy rate was 1.3% and the rental vacancy rate was 5.1%.

Racial composition as of the 2020 census
Race	Number	Percent
White	24,618	63.7%
Black or African American	3,574	9.2%
American Indian and Alaska Native	526	1.4%
Asian	1,122	2.9%
Native Hawaiian and Other Pacific Islander	412	1.1%
Some other race	2,348	6.1%
Two or more races	6,039	15.6%
Hispanic or Latino (of any race)	8,145	21.1%

Security-Widefield CDP, Colorado
Year	Pop.	±%
1960	9,017	—
1970	15,297	+69.6%
1980	18,768	+22.7%
1990	23,822	+26.9%
2000	29,845	+25.3%
2010	32,882	+10.2%
2020	38,639	+17.5%
Source: United States Census Bureau

== Education ==
Students are served by the Widefield School District 3The largest high schools in the region are Mesa Ridge High School and Widefield High School.

== See also ==
- List of census-designated places in Colorado
- United Airlines Flight 585
