= Rampart High School =

Location
- 8250 Lexington Drive; Colorado Springs, Colorado 80920; United States; 38°56′57″N 104°46′20″W

Information
- School type: Comprehensive public high school
- Motto: We Are Rampart!
- Established: 1983 (43 years ago)
- School district: Academy 20
- CEEB code: 060294
- NCES School ID: 080192001321
- Principal: Megan Sanders
- Teaching staff: 84.38 (on an FTE basis)
- Grades: 9–12
- Enrollment: 1,342 (2023–2024)
- Student to teacher ratio: 15.90
- Colors: Royal blue and gold
- Athletics conference: CHSAA
- Mascot: Ram
- Yearbook: Rampages
- Feeder schools: Mountain Ridge Middle School
- Website: rampart.asd20.org

Rampart High School is a public high school in Colorado Springs, Colorado, United States. Established in 1983, it is Academy School District 20's second high school. It was awarded the National School of Excellence award in 1989. It is one of three high schools in Colorado Springs with the International Baccalaureate Programme, the other two being Discovery Canyon Campus and Palmer High School. Its mascot is the Ram.
