= Challenger Middle School =

Challenger Middle School could refer to:

- Challenger Middle School (Alabama), a public school located in Huntsville, Alabama, United States
- Challenger Middle School (California), a school located in San Diego, California, United States
- Challenger Middle School (Colorado), a school located in Academy School District 20 of Colorado Springs, Colorado, United States
- Challenger Middle School (Florida), a school located in Cape Coral, Florida, United States
