= El Paso County, Colorado =

County in Colorado, United States

- County
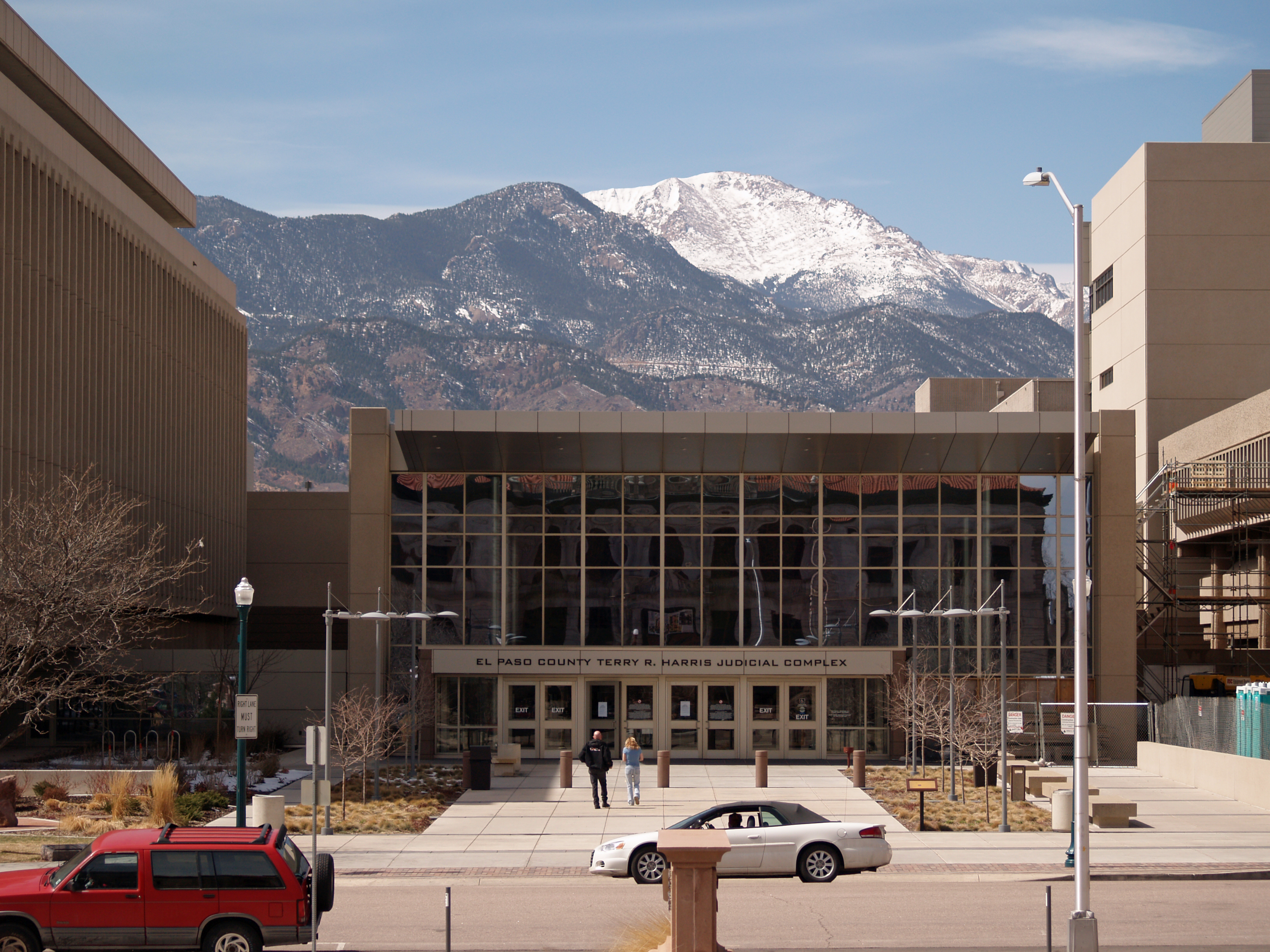
- El Paso County Terry R. Harris Judicial Complex in Colorado Springs

- Flag Seal

- Location within the U.S. state of Colorado
- Coordinates: 38.84°N 104.52°W
- Country: United States
- State: Colorado
- Founded: November 1, 1861
- Named for: Spanish name for The Pass
- Seat: Colorado Springs
- Largest city: Colorado Springs

Area
  - Total: 2,130 sq mi (5,500 km^{2})
  - Land: 2,127 sq mi (5,510 km^{2})
  - Water: 2.7 sq mi (7.0 km^{2}) 0.1%

Population (2020)
  - Total: 730,395
  - Estimate (2025): 757,040 ▲
  - Density: 343.4/sq mi (132.6/km^{2})
- Time zone: UTC−7 (Mountain)
  - Summer (DST): UTC−6 (MDT)
- Congressional districts: 4th, 5th, 7th
- Website: www.elpasoco.com

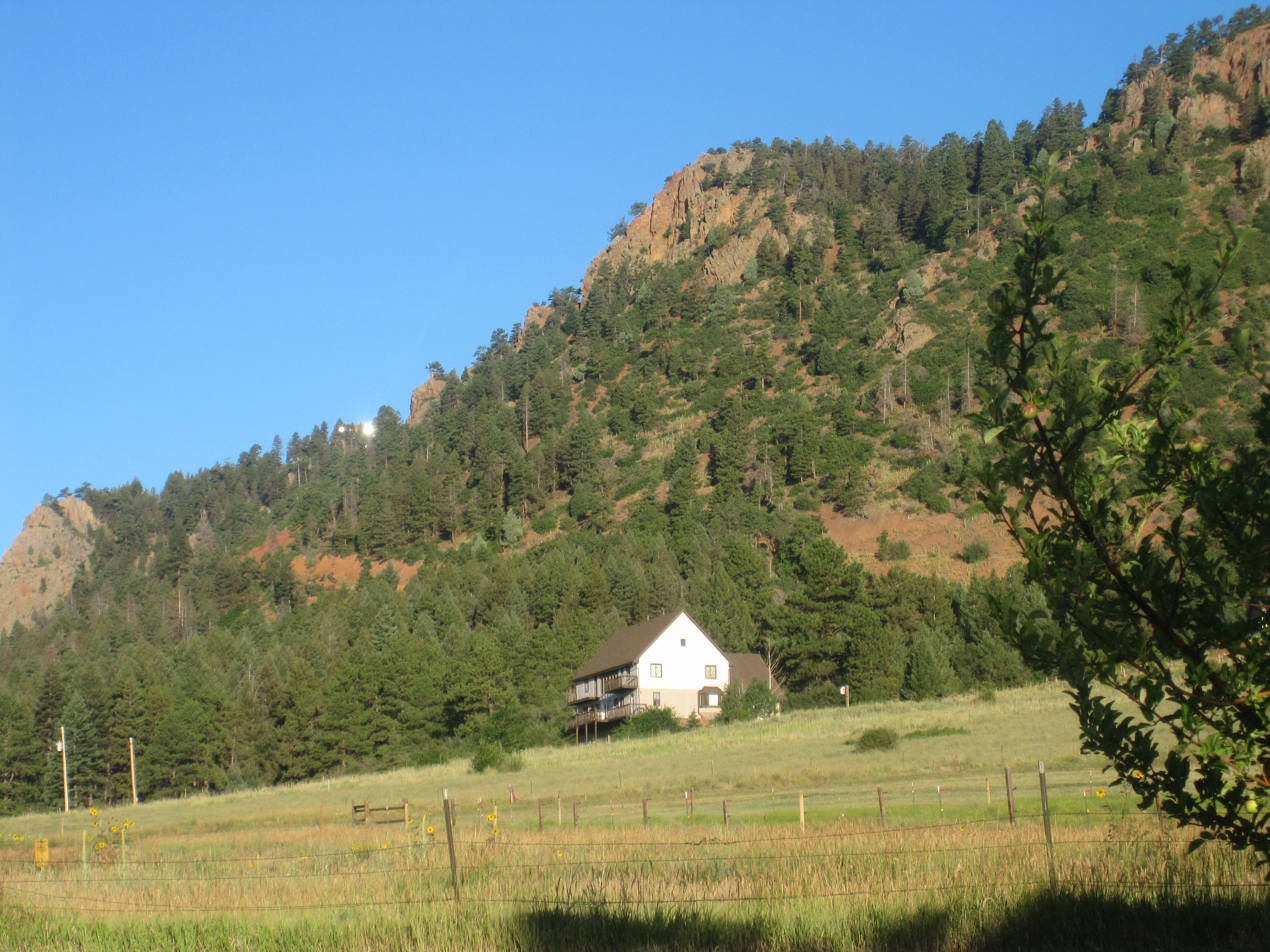
An isolated rural house next to a mountain in northern El Paso County.

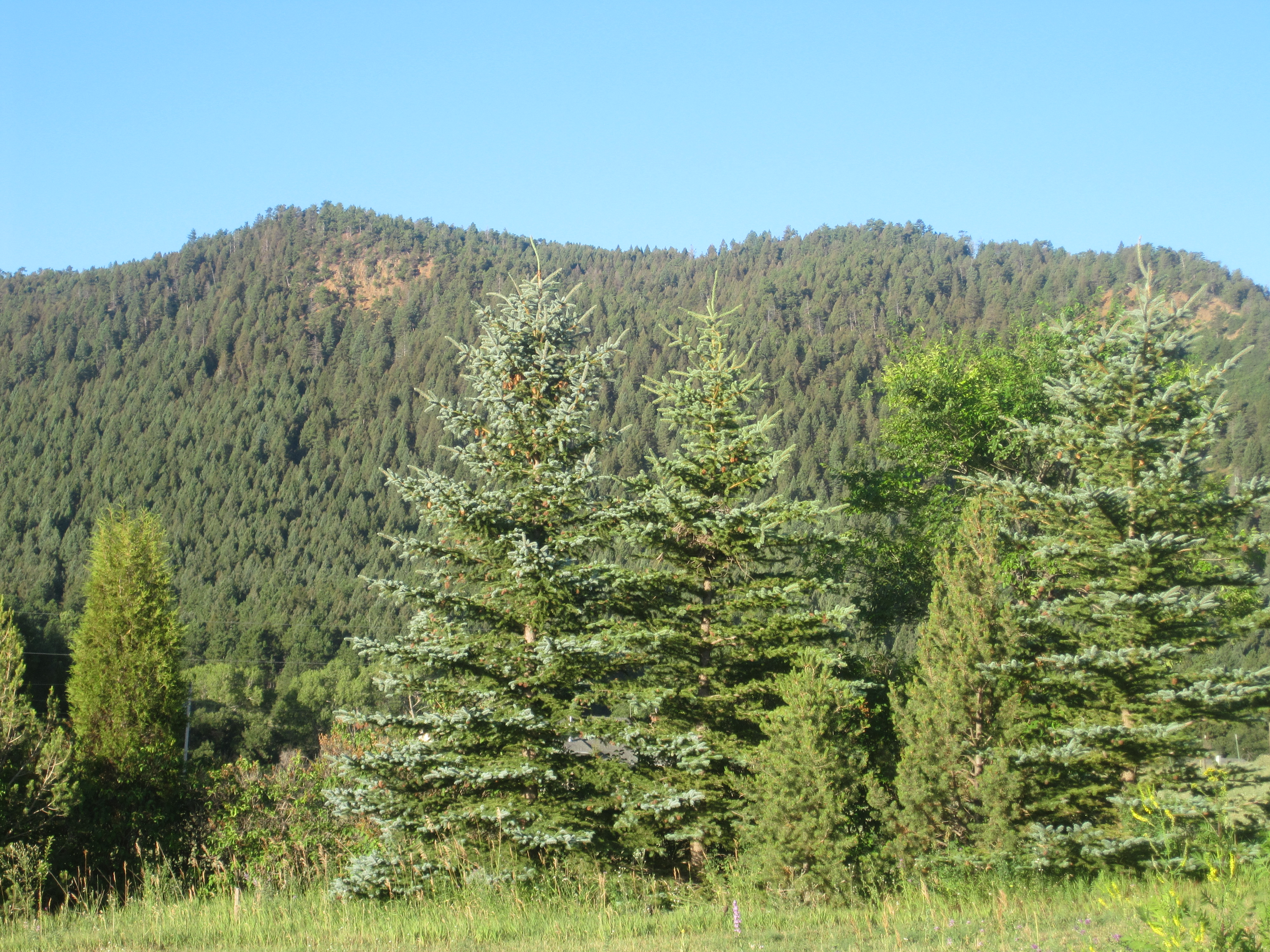
Summer greenery of El Paso County

El Paso County is the most populous county in the U.S state of Colorado. As of the 2020 census, the population was 730,395, surpassing the city and county of Denver. The county seat is Colorado Springs, the second most populous city in Colorado. El Paso County is included in the Colorado Springs, Colorado, Metropolitan Statistical Area.

== History ==
In July 1858, gold was discovered along the South Platte River in Arapahoe County, Kansas Territory. This discovery precipitated the Pike's Peak Gold Rush. Many residents of the mining region felt disconnected from the remote territorial governments of Kansas and Nebraska, so they voted to form their own Territory of Jefferson on October 24, 1859. The following month, the Jefferson Territorial Legislature organized 12 counties for the new territory including El Paso County. El Paso County was named for the Spanish language name for Ute Pass north of Pikes Peak. Colorado City served as the county seat of El Paso County.

The Jefferson Territory never received federal sanction, but on February 28, 1861, U.S. President James Buchanan signed an act organizing the Territory of Colorado. El Paso County was one of the original 17 counties created by the Colorado legislature on November 1, 1861. Part of its western territory was broken off to create Teller County in 1899. Originally based in Old Colorado City (now part of Colorado Springs, not today's Colorado City between Pueblo and Walsenburg), El Paso County's county seat was moved to Colorado Springs in 1873.

== Geography ==
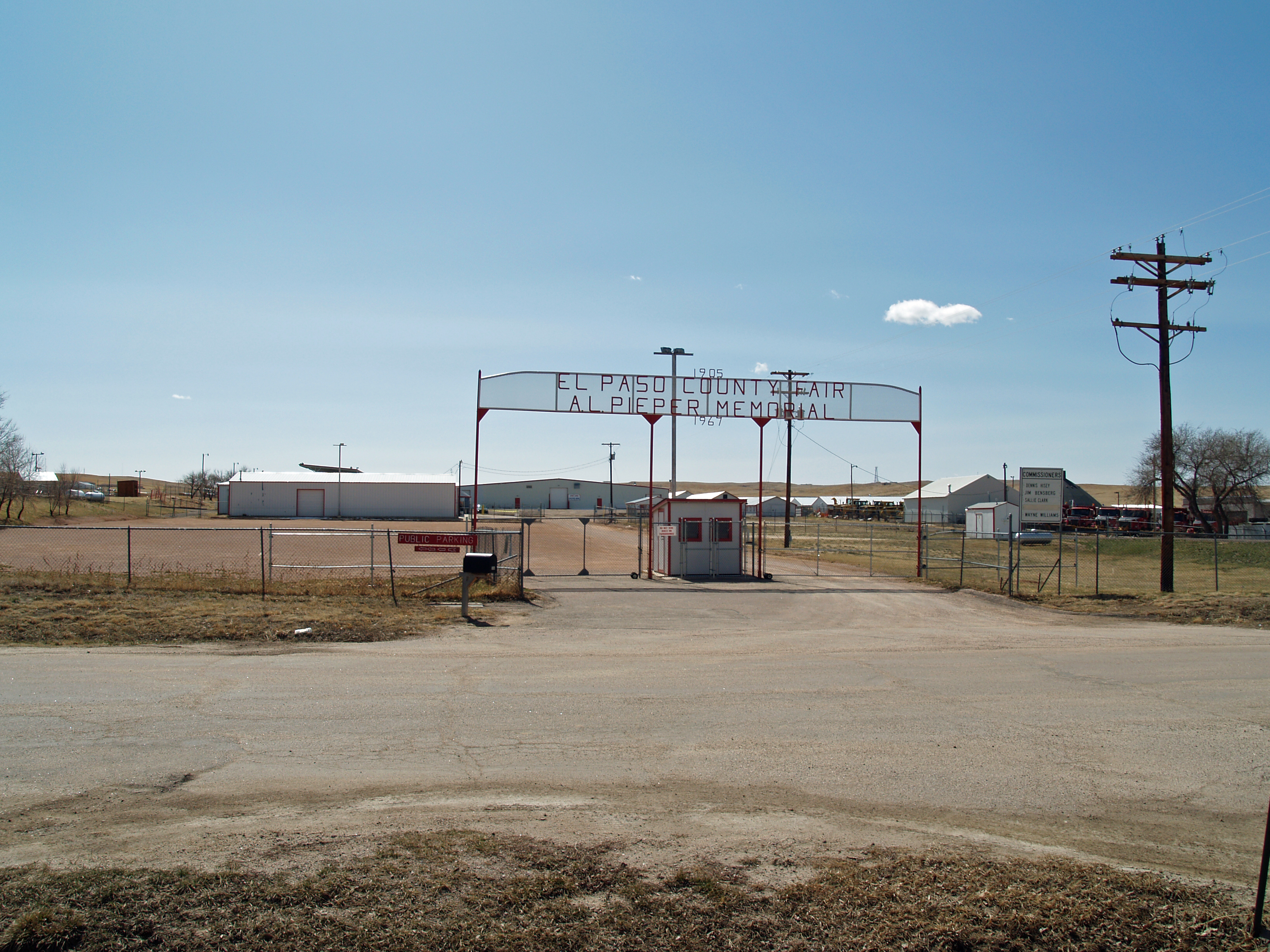
El Paso County Fairgrounds in Calhan, Colorado

According to the United States Census Bureau, the county has a total area of 2,130 square miles (5,500 km^{2}), of which 2,127 square miles (5,510 km^{2}) are land and 2.7 square miles (7.0 km^{2}) (0.1%) are covered by water.

=== Adjacent counties ===
- Douglas County - north
- Elbert County - northeast
- Lincoln County - east
- Crowley County - southeast
- Pueblo County - south
- Fremont County - southwest
- Teller County - west

=== Major highways ===
- I-25 / US 85 / US 87
  - I-25 BL (Nevada Avenue)
- US 24
- SH 16 (Mesa Ridge Parkway)
- SH 21 (Powers Boulevard)
- SH 83
- SH 94
- SH 105
- CR 105
- SH 115

=== National protected area ===
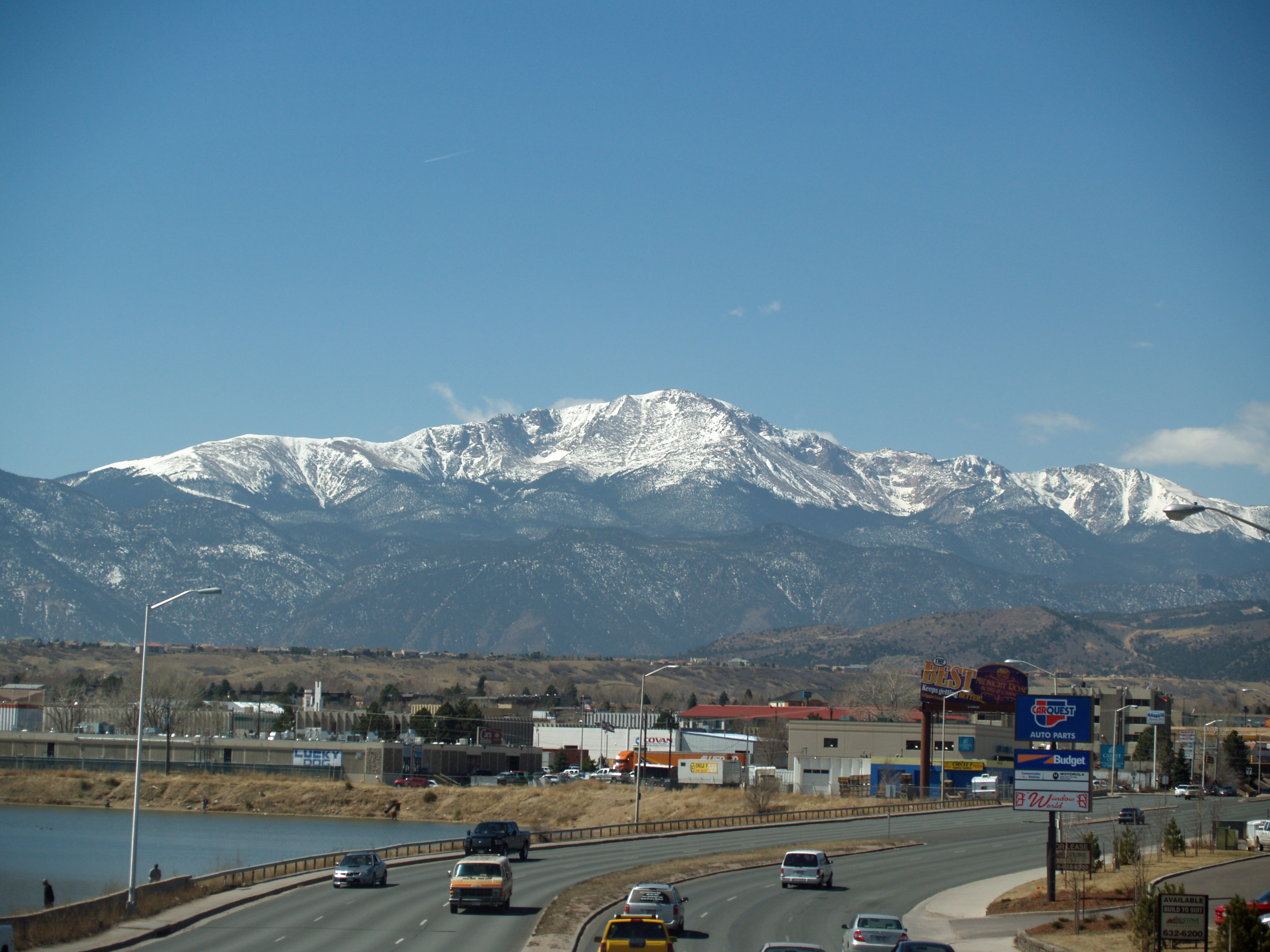
Pikes Peak dominates the county's skyline.

- Pike National Forest

=== State protected area ===
- Cheyenne Mountain State Park

=== Historic sites ===
- Pikes Peak National Historic Landmark
- USAFA Cadet Area National Historic District
- Old Colorado City (National Register of Historic Districts)
- Manitou Springs (National Register of Historic Districts)

=== Trails ===
- American Discovery Trail
- Barr National Recreation Trail
- Bear Creek Cañon Park
- Bear Creek Regional Park and Nature Center
- Calhan Paint Mines
- Fountain Creek Nature Center
- The Incline
- New Santa Fe Trail
- Pikes Peak Greenway
- White House Ranch National Recreation Trail

== Demographics ==
Historical population
Census	Pop.	Note	%±
1870	987		—
1880	7,949		705.4%
1890	21,239		167.2%
1900	31,602		48.8%
1910	43,321		37.1%
1920	44,027		1.6%
1930	49,570		12.6%
1940	54,025		9.0%
1950	74,523		37.9%
1960	143,742		92.9%
1970	235,972		64.2%
1980	309,424		31.1%
1990	397,014		28.3%
2000	516,929		30.2%
2010	622,263		20.4%
2020	730,395		17.4%
2025 (est.)	757,040	▲	3.6%
U.S. Decennial Census; 1790–1960 1900–1990; 1990–2000 2010-2020

=== 2020 census ===
As of the 2020 census, the county had a population of 730,395, distributed in 272,683 households and 185,830 families; the population density was 343.5 people per square mile (132.6 people/km^{2}).

Of the residents, 23.5% were under the age of 18 and 13.7% were 65 years of age or older; the median age was 35.2 years. For every 100 females there were 100.7 males, and for every 100 females age 18 and over there were 99.3 males. 89.7% of residents lived in urban areas and 10.3% lived in rural areas.

El Paso County, Colorado – Racial and ethnic composition Note: the US Census treats Hispanic/Latino as an ethnic category. This table excludes Latinos from the racial categories and assigns them to a separate category. Hispanics/Latinos may be of any race.
Race / Ethnicity (NH = Non-Hispanic)	Pop 2000	Pop 2010	Pop 2020	% 2000	% 2010	% 2020
White alone (NH)	393,819	447,947	480,484	76.18%	71.99%	65.78%
Black or African American alone (NH)	32,393	35,792	40,759	6.27%	5.75%	5.58%
Native American or Alaska Native alone (NH)	3,296	3,693	3,816	0.64%	0.59%	0.52%
Asian alone (NH)	12,791	16,492	21,629	2.47%	2.65%	2.96%
Pacific Islander alone (NH)	1,145	1,911	2,750	0.22%	0.31%	0.38%
Other race alone (NH)	974	1,147	4,599	0.19%	0.18%	0.63%
Mixed race or Multiracial (NH)	14,110	21,616	46,374	2.73%	3.47%	6.35%
Hispanic or Latino (any race)	58,401	93,665	129,984	11.30%	15.05%	17.80%
Total	516,929	622,263	730,395	100.00%	100.00%	100.00%

The racial makeup of the county was 70.8% White, 6.0% Black or African American, 1.0% American Indian and Alaska Native, 3.1% Asian, 0.4% Native Hawaiian and Pacific Islander, 5.9% from some other race, and 12.8% from two or more races. Hispanic or Latino residents of any race comprised 17.8% of the population.

There were 272,683 households in the county, of which 32.4% had children under the age of 18 living with them and 23.6% had a female householder with no spouse or partner present. About 24.5% of all households were made up of individuals and 8.6% had someone living alone who was 65 years of age or older.

There were 287,459 housing units, of which 5.1% were vacant. Among occupied housing units, 65.6% were owner-occupied and 34.4% were renter-occupied. The homeowner vacancy rate was 0.9% and the rental vacancy rate was 6.2%.

The population pyramid for El Paso County shows a slight surplus of males aged between birth and 45 years, with a slight surplus of females over age 45, as is typical of most American populations. The greater than normal surplus of males between 18 and 35 is chiefly attributable to the presence of five military installations in the county.

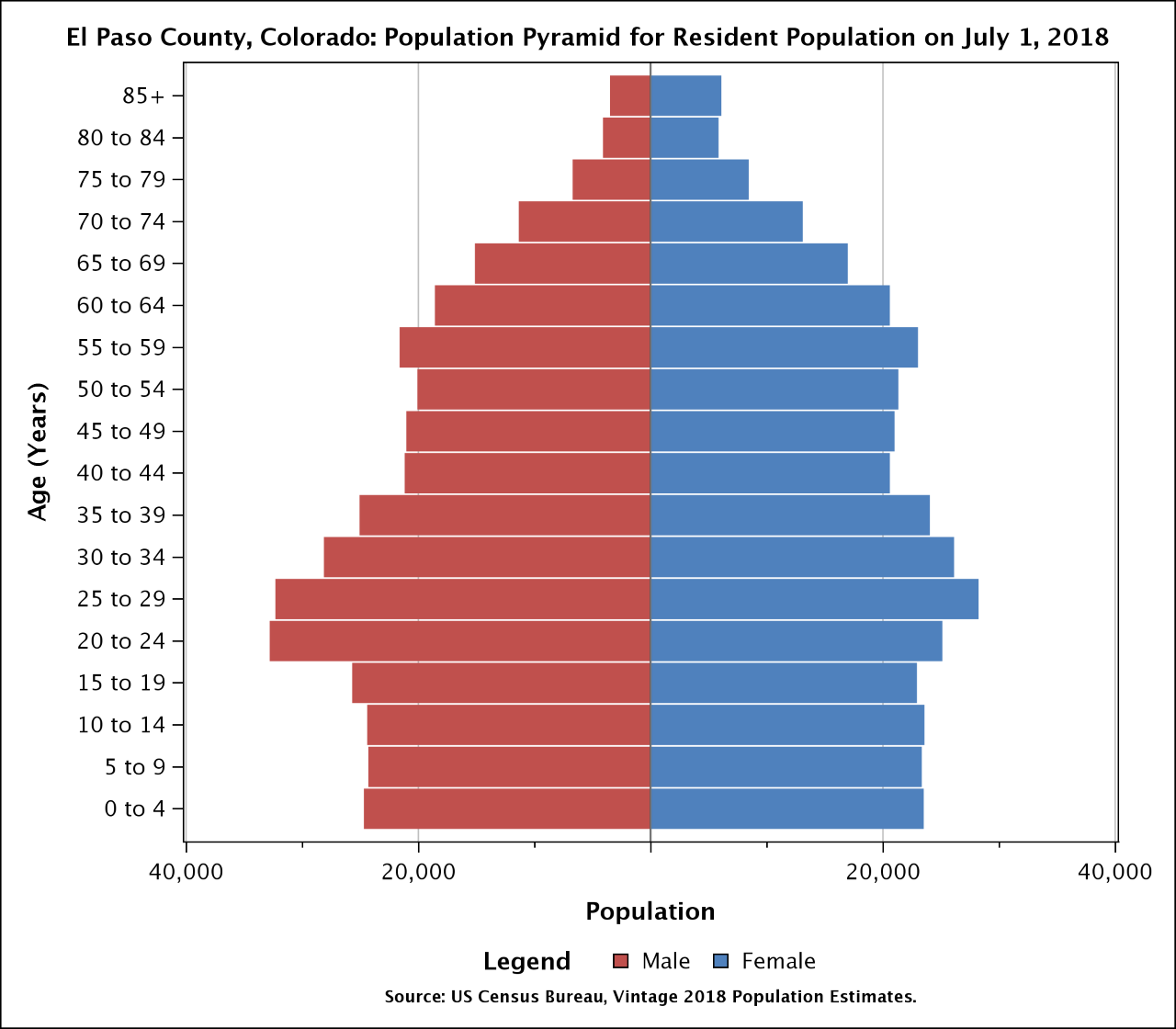
El Paso County Colorado Population Pyramid

== Education ==
=== K-12 Education ===
El Paso County is home to 17 public school districts, in addition to several private schools.

School districts include:

- Academy School District 20
- Big Sandy School District 100J
- Calhan School District RJ-1
- Cheyenne Mountain School District 12
- Colorado Springs School District 11
- Edison School District 54-JT
- Ellicott School District 22
- Fremont RE-2 School District
- Fountain School District 8
- Hanover School District 28
- Harrison School District 2
- Manitou Springs School District 14
- Miami-Yoder School District 60-JT
- Lewis-Palmer School District 38
- Peyton School District 23-JT
- School District 49
- Widefield School District 3

=== Higher Education ===
El Paso County is home to several colleges and universities. The United States Air Force Academy is located immediately north of Colorado Springs, serving as both a university and a functional U.S. Air Force base. Also in the county are the University of Colorado Colorado Springs, Colorado College, Pikes Peak State College, Colorado Technical University, and IntelliTec College, all located in Colorado Springs.

== Government ==
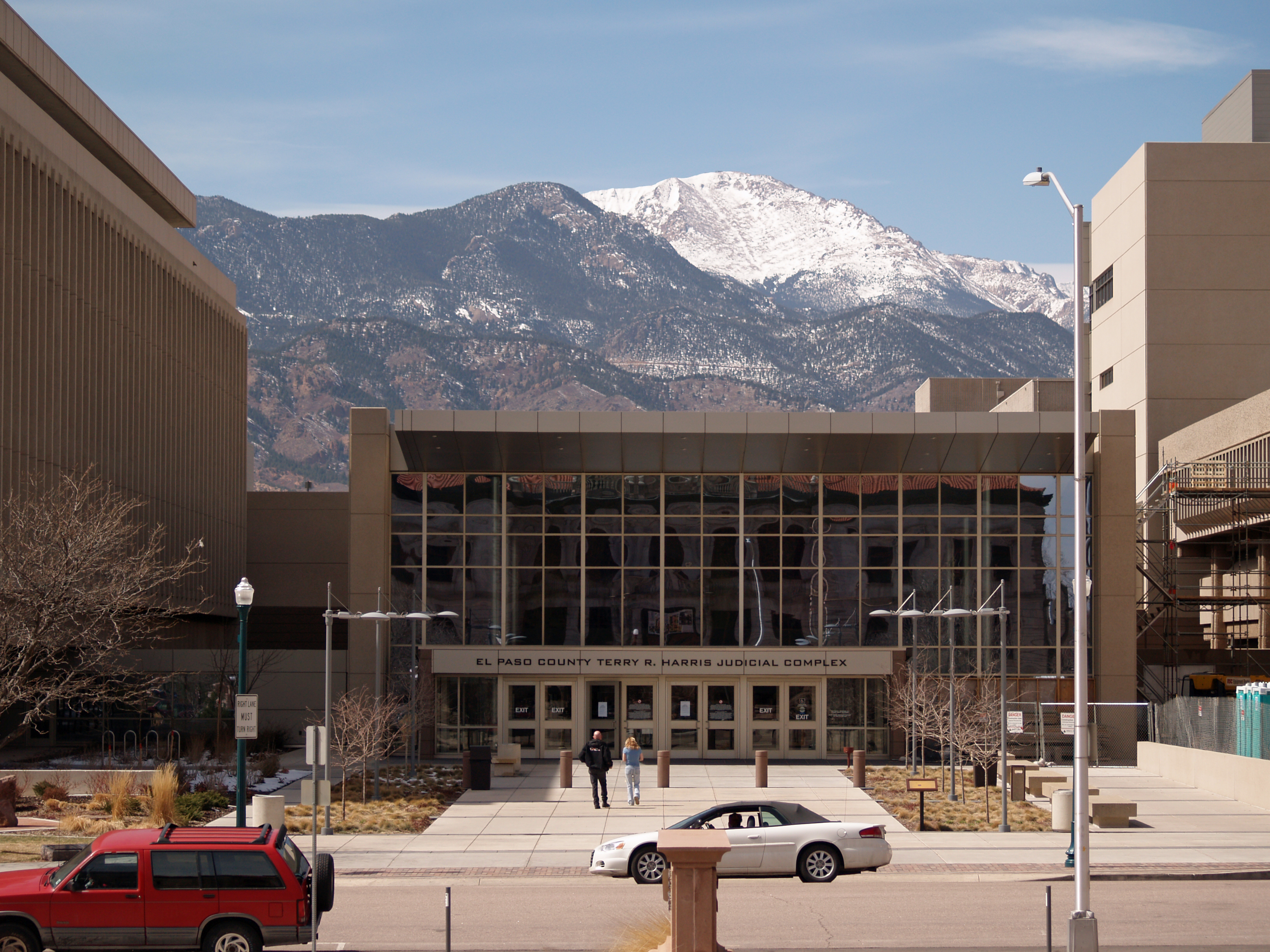
El Paso County Justice Center in Colorado Springs

El Paso County is located in Colorado's 5th congressional district, except for the far eastern extremities, which are located in the 4th. The county is governed by a board of county commissioners. Its current members are Holly Williams in district 1, Carrie Geitner in district 2, Bill Wysong in district 3, Cory Applegate in district 4, and Lauren Nelson in district 5.

In 2004, the voters of Colorado Springs and El Paso County established the Pikes Peak Rural Transportation Authority (PPRTA) and adopted a 1% sales tax dedicated to improving the region's transportation infrastructure. Together with state funding for COSMIX (2007 completion) and the I-25 interchange with Highway 16 (2008 completion), significant progress has been made since 2003 in addressing the transportation needs of the area. In 2012, the county voted to legalize marijuana. On March 12, 2019, the county commissioners unanimously passed a resolution to become a Second Amendment sanctuary.

The Colorado Department of Corrections has its headquarters in an unincorporated area in the county.

Office	Name
County Commissioner District 1	Holly Williams (R)
County Commissioner District 2	Carrie Geitner (R)
County Commissioner District 3	Bill Wysong (R)
County Commissioner District 4	Cory Applegate (R)
County Commissioner District 5	Lauren Nelson (R)
County Assessor	Mark Flutcher (R)
County Clerk and Recorder	Steve Schleiker (R)
County Coroner	Emily Russell-Kinsley (Unknown)
Sheriff	Joe Roybal (R)
County Surveyor	Richard Mariotti (R)
County Treasurer	Chuck Broerman (R)

El Paso County lies within the 4th Judicial District which is represented by District Attorney Michael Allen.

=== Top employers ===
According to its 2022 Comprehensive Annual Financial Report, El Paso County's largest employers are:

#	Employer	# of Employees	Percentage
1	Fort Carson	36,000	9.35%
2	Peterson Space Force Base	10,650	2.77%
3	Schriever Space Force Base	8,000	2.08%
4	United States Air Force Academy	7,650	1.99%
5	UCHealth Memorial Health Services	6,000	1.56%
6	The Charter Spectrum West Region	4,900	1.27%
7	Amazon	4,800	1.25%
8	Penrose Hospital	3,560	0.92%
9	Colorado Springs School District 11	3,300	0.86%
10	Academy School District 20	3,150	0.82%
	Total	88,010	22.87%

== Politics ==
United States presidential election results for El Paso County, Colorado
Year	Republican		Democratic		Third party(ies)	
Year	No.	%	No.	%	No.	%
1880	1,151	65.36%	580	32.94%	30	1.70%
1884	1,209	65.71%	534	29.02%	97	5.27%
1888	2,164	60.58%	1,281	35.86%	127	3.56%
1892	2,657	47.39%	0	0.00%	2,950	52.61%
1896	6,248	25.75%	17,672	72.84%	340	1.40%
1900	7,755	53.76%	6,230	43.19%	439	3.04%
1904	9,589	62.07%	5,281	34.18%	579	3.75%
1908	8,022	53.25%	5,995	39.79%	1,048	6.96%
1912	2,816	18.72%	5,559	36.95%	6,671	44.34%
1916	7,159	43.55%	8,381	50.99%	897	5.46%
1920	9,535	62.78%	5,073	33.40%	581	3.83%
1924	10,215	55.69%	4,140	22.57%	3,989	21.75%
1928	16,243	75.28%	5,069	23.49%	266	1.23%
1932	12,017	49.35%	11,353	46.62%	980	4.02%
1936	10,965	39.82%	15,652	56.84%	920	3.34%
1940	16,766	55.31%	13,320	43.94%	229	0.76%
1944	16,392	58.16%	11,679	41.44%	115	0.41%
1948	15,705	55.26%	12,291	43.25%	423	1.49%
1952	25,272	68.71%	11,203	30.46%	303	0.82%
1956	27,282	58.46%	18,879	40.46%	505	1.08%
1960	31,625	64.93%	17,018	34.94%	61	0.13%
1964	23,822	45.98%	27,844	53.75%	141	0.27%
1968	32,066	53.75%	21,232	35.59%	6,357	10.66%
1972	53,892	69.11%	21,234	27.23%	2,859	3.67%
1976	50,929	59.13%	32,911	38.21%	2,290	2.66%
1980	66,199	63.66%	27,463	26.41%	10,328	9.93%
1984	88,377	75.04%	28,185	23.93%	1,210	1.03%
1988	96,965	70.03%	39,995	28.88%	1,506	1.09%
1992	86,044	51.47%	45,827	27.41%	35,298	21.12%
1996	102,403	59.04%	55,822	32.19%	15,216	8.77%
2000	128,294	63.91%	61,799	30.78%	10,664	5.31%
2004	161,361	66.74%	77,648	32.11%	2,779	1.15%
2008	160,318	58.69%	108,899	39.86%	3,958	1.45%
2012	170,952	58.91%	111,819	38.54%	7,404	2.55%
2016	179,228	56.19%	108,010	33.86%	31,730	9.95%
2020	202,828	53.54%	161,941	42.75%	14,082	3.72%
2024	203,933	53.53%	166,597	43.73%	10,456	2.74%

United States Senate election results for El Paso County, Colorado2
Year	Republican		Democratic		Third party(ies)	
Year	No.	%	No.	%	No.	%
2020	212,057	56.27%	152,126	40.36%	12,697	3.37%

United States Senate election results for El Paso County, Colorado3
Year	Republican		Democratic		Third party(ies)	
Year	No.	%	No.	%	No.	%
2022	149,995	52.76%	124,024	43.62%	10,295	3.62%

Colorado Gubernatorial election results for El Paso County
Year	Republican		Democratic		Third party(ies)	
Year	No.	%	No.	%	No.	%
2022	144,384	50.66%	133,447	46.82%	7,196	2.52%

El Paso is quite conservative for a large urban county, although it has become less so since the 2010s. Its conservative bent predates the influence of its large military and Evangelical Christian populations. Since its creation in 1871, El Paso County has typically voted for the Republican presidential candidate in presidential elections; the last Democratic nominee to win the county was Lyndon B. Johnson in 1964. Even then, Barry Goldwater got nearly 46% of the county's vote. It has voted Republican in every presidential election since 1920, except for the Democratic landslides of 1936 and 1964.

After Johnson carried it in 1964, a Democrat would not win 40 percent of the county's vote again until Joe Biden in 2020. Kamala Harris also received above 40% of the county in 2024, with the county swinging to the left unlike the state and country. The county still remains a Republican stronghold, but less overwhelmingly so than in years past. The county also voted in favor of 2024 Colorado Amendment 79. Democratic strength is concentrated in the inner portion of Colorado Springs.

Dick Lamm in 1982 remains the last Democrat to win the county in a gubernatorial election. Eight years later, the county was one of only four in the state to back governor Roy Romer's opponent John Andrews. Jared Polis in 2022 came within 4% of winning the county. The last Democrat to win the county in a Senate election was Gary Hart in 1974.

== Libraries ==
The Pikes Peak Library District provides library services through its 15 branches and bookmobiles to the residents of El Paso County, with the exception of Widefield School District 3. The mission of the District is "Providing resources and opportunities that impact individual lives and build community. Seek. Engage. Transform."

== Military installations ==
El Paso County is home to Army, Air Force and Space Force bases. These military installations border Colorado Springs to the north, south, and east, aside from Schriever Space Force Base, which is located about 10 miles east of Peterson Space Force Base.

=== Fort Carson ===
Fort Carson, "The Mountain Post", is located just south of Colorado Springs at the base of the Rocky Mountains. It was established in 1942, following Japan's attack on Pearl Harbor. The city of Colorado Springs purchased land south of the city and donated it to the War Department. Construction began immediately and the first building, the camp headquarters, was completed January 31, 1942. Camp Carson was named in honor of the legendary Army scout Gen. Christopher "Kit" Carson, who explored much of the West in the 1800s. Camp Carson became Fort Carson in 1954. An additional training area was purchased in September 1983 and is called Piñon Canyon Maneuver Site (PCMS).

Currently, Fort Carson is the home of 4th Infantry Division and several other units, including 10th Special Forces Group (Airborne), the Colorado National Guard Regional Training Institute and PCMS, which is a maneuver training site for Fort Carson located near Trinidad, Colorado. The installation totals about 137,000 acres and PCMS is roughly 236,000 acres. Fort Carson has around 3,000 family housing units and 66 soldier barracks with 8,132 rooms. Services on the installation include four elementary schools, one middle school, a commissary, an exchange, and Evans Army Community Hospital, as well as Army Community Service facilities to include child development centers and youth centers and family morale, welfare, and recreation facilities to include a bowling alley, golf course, and numerous parks.

Fort Carson's economic impact on Colorado Springs and the surrounding communities was approximately $2.3 billion during fiscal year 2014. Fort Carson has about 24,300 soldiers on the installation, with 44,700 family members. The installation also has around 8,000 veterans and 3,300 civilians.

=== Peterson Space Force Base ===
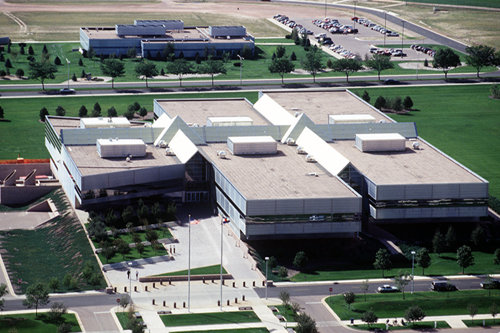
AFSPC Headquarters, Peterson AFB, Colorado Springs.

The Space Force has critical aspects of their service based at Colorado Springs, which carry on missile defense operations and development. The Space Force bases a large section of its national missile defense operations here, with Peterson Space Force Base set to operate large sections of the program. The base is also home to Space Force's Combat Forces Command, and to NORAD headquarters. Peterson SFB is currently the headquarters of the operations-half of Army Space and Missile Defense Command/Army Strategic Command.

Peterson is also headquarters for the United States Northern Command, one of the Unified Combatant Commands, which directs all branches of the U.S. military operations in their area of responsibility, which includes the continental United States, Alaska, Canada, and Mexico. In the event of national emergencies, the President or Secretary of Defense can call upon the command for any required military assistance. Service members from every branch of the US military are stationed at the command.

Peterson SFB is the current, possibly temporary home for US Space Command, another Unified Combatant Command, whose area of operations is global operations occurring 50 miles or greater above the Earth.

=== Schriever Space Force Base (formerly Schriever AFB and Falcon AFB) ===
Schriever Space Force Base is home to several Space Force mission Deltas, responsible for the operation and support of 175 Department of Defense satellites and installation support to 16 major tenant units, with a workforce of more than 7,700 personnel. It is the location of the Global Positioning System (GPS) master control station and GPS Operations Center and the US Naval Observatory Alternate Master Clock, used to synchronize GPS satellite time. Schriever is also developing parts of national missile defense and runs parts of the annual wargames used by the nation's military. The base indirectly contributes an estimated $1 billion to the local Colorado Springs, CO area annually.

=== United States Air Force Academy ===
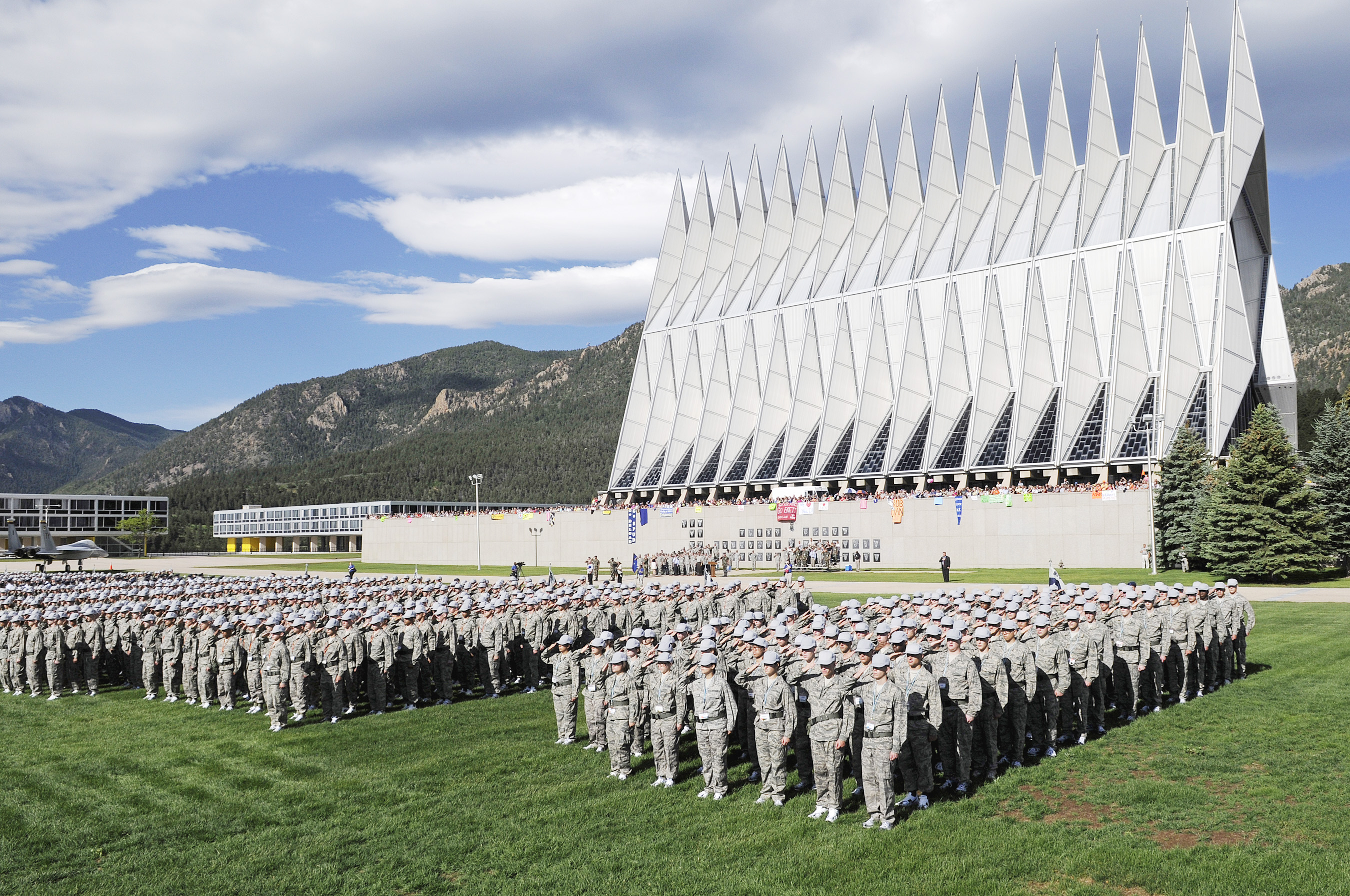
Cadets in front of the Academy Chapel

Bordering the northwestern side of the city are the grounds of the United States Air Force Academy, where cadets train to become officers in the Air Force and Space Force. The campus is famous for its unique chapel, and draws visitors year round. Most of the Air Force Academy's sports programs participate in the Mountain West Conference.

=== Cheyenne Mountain Space Force Station (formerly Air Force Station) ===
The North American Aerospace Defense Command (NORAD), headquartered on Peterson SFB, has a presence in Cheyenne Mountain Space Force Station. When it was built at the height of the Cold War, NORAD caused some anxiety for the residents in and around Colorado Springs, who believed the installation would be a primary target during a nuclear attack. Although NORAD still operates today, it is primarily given the task of the tracking of ICBMs, and the military has recently decided to place Cheyenne Mountain's NORAD/NORTHCOM operations on warm standby and move operations to nearby Peterson Air Force Base.

== Communities ==
=== Cities ===
- Colorado Springs (county seat)
- Fountain
- Manitou Springs

=== Towns ===
- Calhan
- Green Mountain Falls (partly in Teller County)
- Monument
- Palmer Lake
- Ramah

=== Census-designated places ===
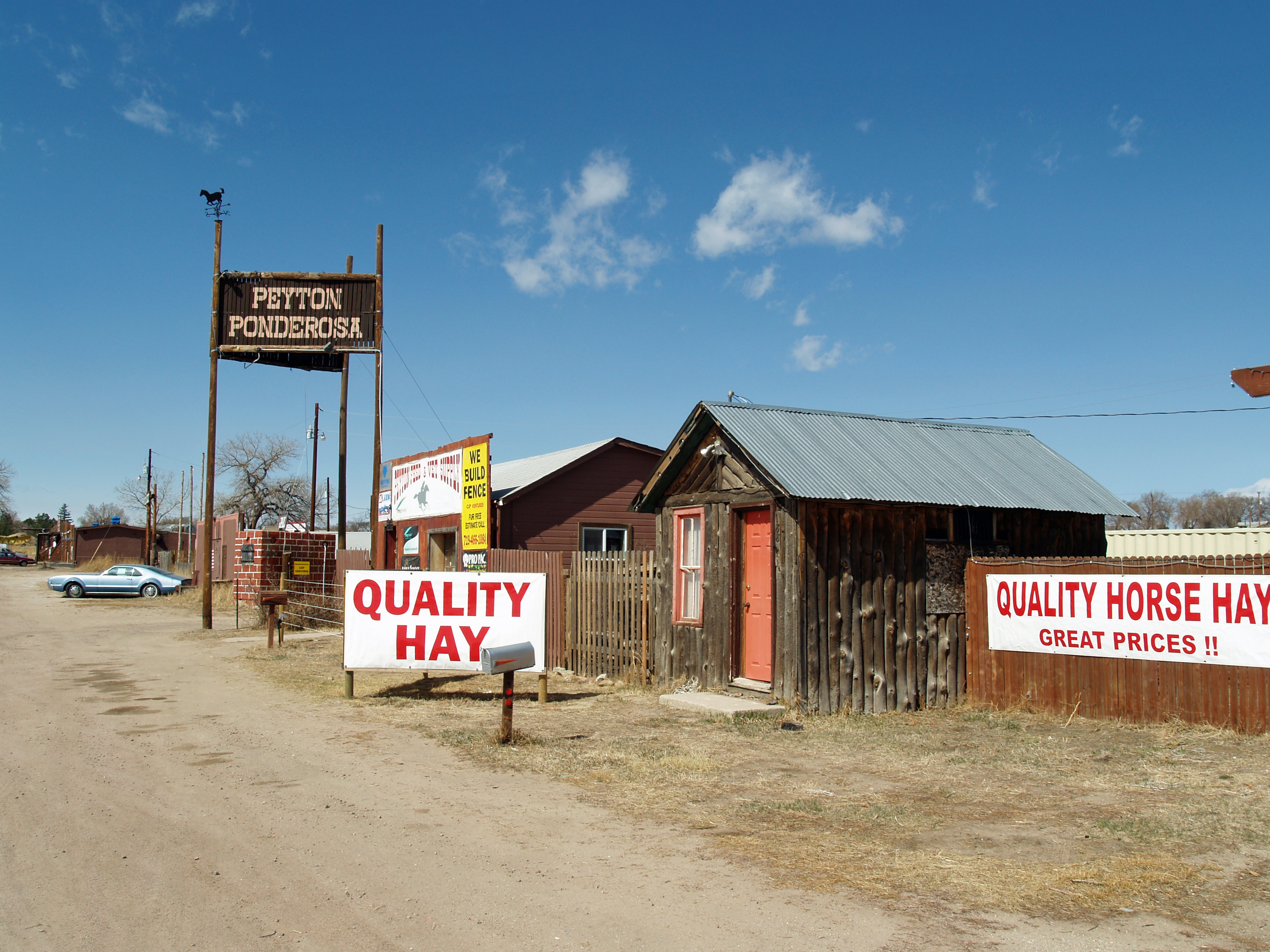
Peyton, Colorado.

- Air Force Academy
- Black Forest
- Cascade-Chipita Park
- Cimarron Hills
- Ellicott
- Fort Carson
- Gleneagle
- Peyton
- Rock Creek Park
- Security-Widefield
- Stratmoor
- Woodmoor

=== Other unincorporated communities ===
- Crystola (partly in Teller County)
- Eastonville
- Falcon
- La Foret
- Rush
- Truckton
- Yoder

== See also ==
- Bibliography of Colorado
- Geography of Colorado
- History of Colorado
  - Arapahoe County, Kansas Territory
  - El Paso County, Jefferson Territory
  - National Register of Historic Places listings in El Paso County, Colorado
- Index of Colorado-related articles
- List of Colorado-related lists
  - List of counties in Colorado
  - List of statistical areas in Colorado
- Outline of Colorado
  - Front Range Urban Corridor
  - Kirk Hanna Park
