= Daniel Carlson =

American football player (born 1995)

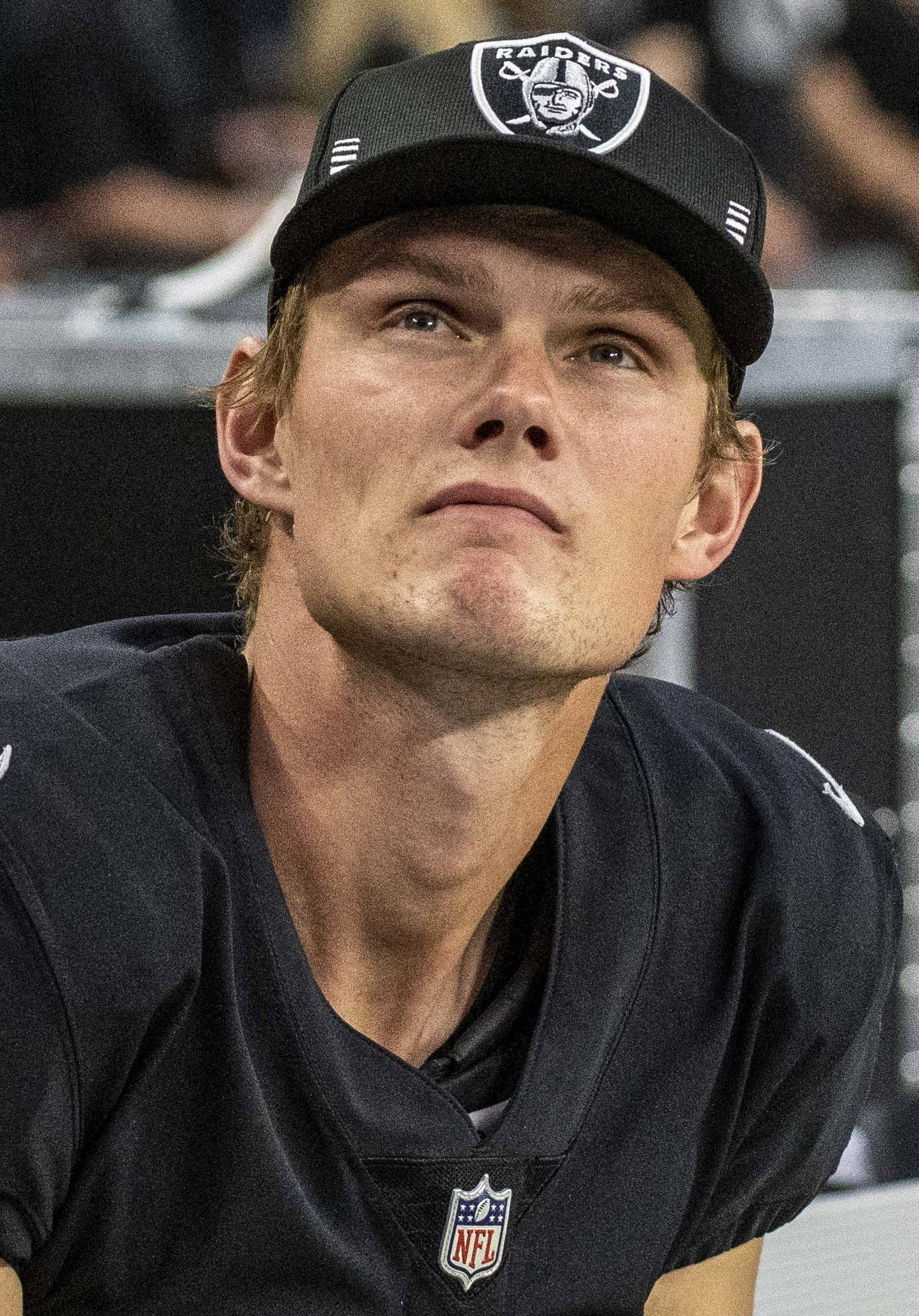
- Carlson with the Las Vegas Raiders in 2021

No. 38 – Miami Dolphins
- Position: Placekicker
- Roster status: Practice squad

Personal information
- Born: January 23, 1995 (age 31); Dallas, Texas, U.S.
- Listed height: 6 ft 5 in (1.96 m)
- Listed weight: 213 lb (97 kg)

Career information
- High school: The Classical Academy (Colorado Springs, Colorado)
- College: Auburn (2013–2017)
- NFL draft: 2018: 5th round, 167th overall pick

Career history
- Minnesota Vikings (2018); Oakland / Las Vegas Raiders (2018–2025); New Orleans Saints (2026); Miami Dolphins (2026–present)

Awards and highlights
- First-team All-Pro (2022); Second-team All-Pro (2021); 2× NFL scoring co-leader (2020 (Note: Tied with Younghoe Koo and Jason Sanders.), 2021 (Note: Tied with Nick Folk.)); 2× SEC Special Teams Player of the Year (2016, 2017); 3× Second-team All-American (2015–2017); 3× First-team All-SEC (2015–2017)

Career NFL statistics as of Week 7, 2026
- Field goals made: 233
- Field goals attempted: 271
- Field goal %: 86.0%
- Extra points made: 260
- Extra points attempted: 273
- Extra point %: 95.2%
- Points: 959
- Longest field goal: 60
- Touchbacks: 355
- Stats at Pro Football Reference

Daniel Vilhelm Carlson (born January 23, 1995) is an American professional football placekicker for the Miami Dolphins of the National Football League (NFL). He played college football for the Auburn Tigers, becoming the all-time leading scorer of the Southeastern Conference (SEC), and was selected by the Minnesota Vikings in the fifth round of the 2018 NFL draft. Released by the Vikings during his rookie season, Carlson joined the Oakland Raiders and has since co-led the league in scoring in both 2020 and 2021. He is currently the tenth-most accurate kicker in NFL history. (Note: Minimum 100 career field goal attempts.)

== Early life ==
Carlson was born on January 23, 1995, to Hans and Jodie Carlson. He has an older brother named Nils and a younger brother named Anders, who played kicker for the Green Bay Packers and the New York Jets.

Carlson attended The Classical Academy before college.

== College career ==
Under head coach Gus Malzahn, Carlson never missed an extra point in his collegiate career with the Auburn Tigers. He was the all-time leading scorer in Southeastern Conference (SEC) football history with 480 career points until passed by Will Reichard of Alabama in 2023. Carlson was a three time member of the All SEC Team First Team.

== Professional career ==
Pre-draft measurables
Height	Weight	Arm length	Hand span	Wingspan
6 ft 5 1/4 in (1.96 m)	213 lb (97 kg)	32 in (0.81 m)	9 3/4 in (0.25 m)	6 ft 3 3/4 in (1.92 m)
All values from NFL Combine

=== Minnesota Vikings ===
Carlson was selected by the Minnesota Vikings in the fifth round (167th overall) of the 2018 NFL draft. He was one of two kickers to be selected that year, the other being Jason Sanders by the Miami Dolphins.

In the offseason, he competed with veteran kicker Kai Forbath. Forbath was released by the team on August 20, 2018. Carlson made his NFL debut in the season-opening 24–16 victory over the San Francisco 49ers and converted all three extra point attempts and a field goal attempt. In the next game against the Green Bay Packers, he missed a field goal in regulation and two in overtime, resulting in a 29–29 tie. The following day, Carlson was waived and replaced by veteran Dan Bailey.

=== Oakland / Las Vegas Raiders ===
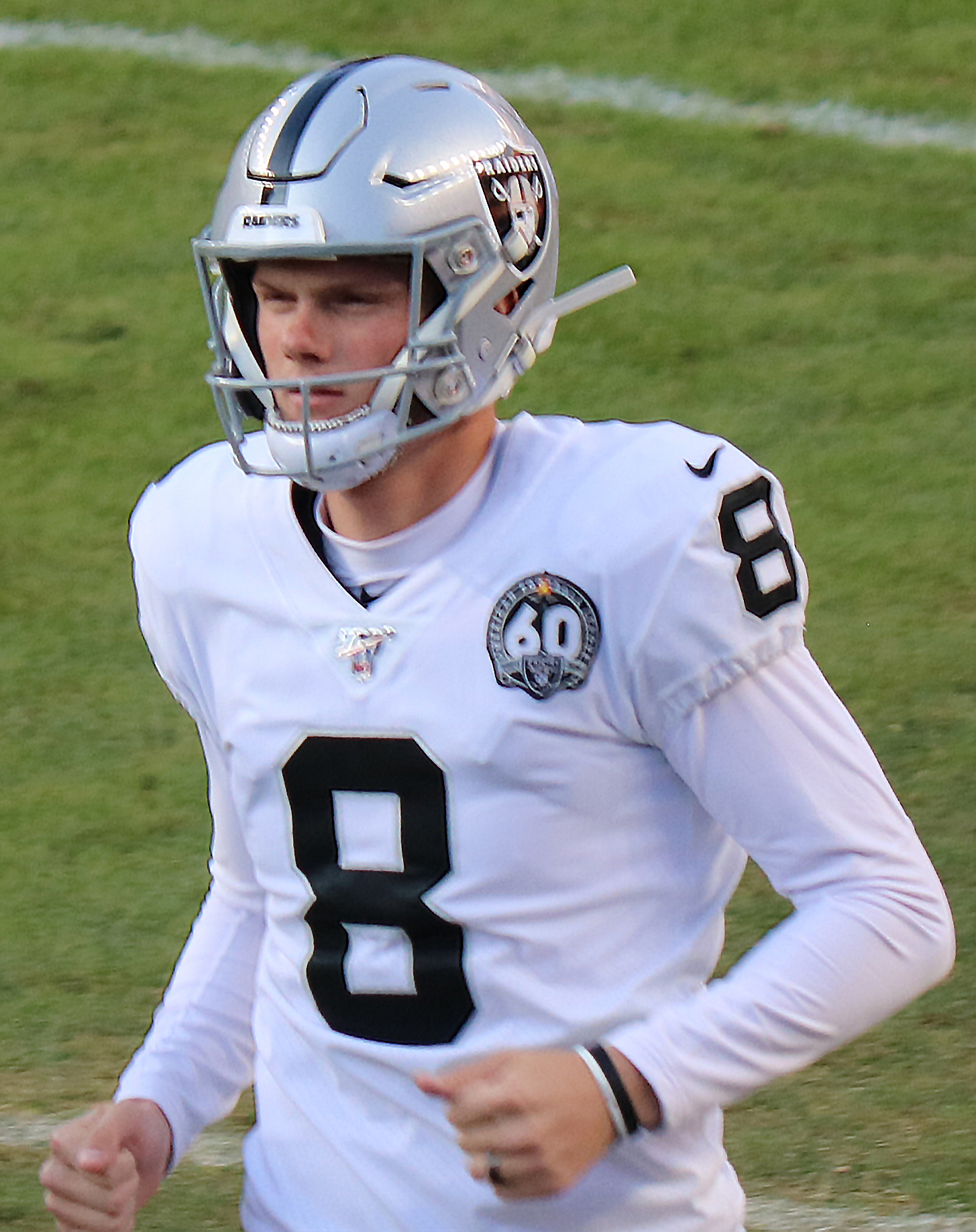
Carlson in 2019

==== 2018 season ====
Carlson was signed by the Oakland Raiders on October 23, 2018, after the team released fellow rookie kicker Matt McCrane. In his Raiders' debut in Week 8, Carlson converted all four extra point attempts during a 42–28 loss to the Indianapolis Colts. Three weeks later, Carlson made two extra points and three field goals, including a 35-yard game winner as time expired, in a narrow 23–21 victory over the Arizona Cardinals, earning him AFC Special Teams Player of the Week honors. Carlson went on to convert 94% of his field goal attempts for the Raiders in 2018, setting a new team record.

2019 season

The 2019 season was a relative disappointment for Carlson, struggling on conversion at longer distances. He went 10-for-16 with field goals attempts between 40–49 yards, and missed both attempts beyond 50 yards (51 and 53 yards). Carlson's field goal conversion rate for the season dropped 20 points from his 2018 season to 73.1%.

==== 2020 season ====
On April 16, 2020, Carlson was re-signed to a one-year contract. During the 2020 offseason, Carlson switched his jersey number from 8 to 2 in order for quarterback Marcus Mariota to wear number 8. In Week 1 against the Carolina Panthers, Carlson was a perfect 4-for-4 on his extra point and field goal attempts, including a career long 54-yard field goal, during the 34–30 road victory. Carlson was named the AFC Special Teams Player of the Week for his performance. Carlson was also named the AFC Special Teams Player of the Month for his performance the following December.

==== 2021 season ====
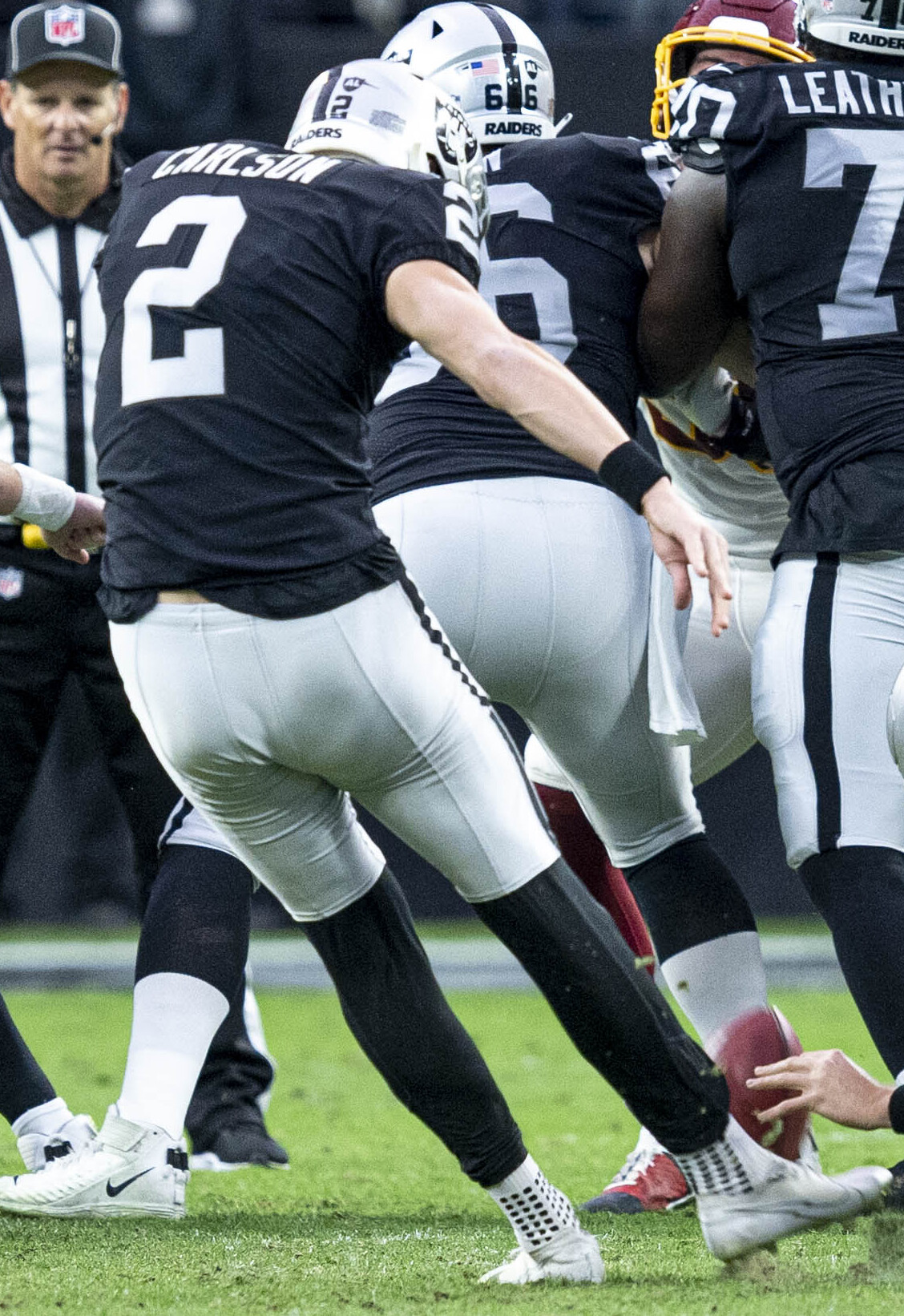
Carlson kicking a field goal against the Washington Football Team, 2021

The Raiders placed a second-round restricted free agent tender on Carlson on March 17, 2021. He signed the tender on April 29. In Week 2, Carlson converted all four field goal attempts and both extra-point attempts in a 26–17 victory over the Pittsburgh Steelers, earning AFC Special Teams Player of the Week. On Thanksgiving Day against the Dallas Cowboys, he went 3–3 on extra points and 5–5 on field goals in a 36–33 overtime road victory, including a career-long 56-yarder to take a late lead in the 4th quarter and a 29-yarder to win the game in overtime. Carlson's Thanksgiving Day performance earned him another AFC Special Teams Player of the Week honor, a feat only two other kickers had achieved at that point in the season.

On December 9, 2021, Carlson signed a four-year, $18.4 million extension with the Raiders, making him the third-highest-paid kicker in the NFL.

Down the stretch of the 2021 season, Carlson's kicking performance would become crucial for the Raiders. In Week 15 against the Cleveland Browns, Carlson made all three of his field goal attempts, the last of which being a 48-yard field goal that won the game for the Raiders. Two weeks later against the Indianapolis Colts, Carlson successfully converted all three of his field goal attempts and both of his extra-point attempts to account for 11 of the 23 points the Raiders scored in the contest, including the game-winning field goal. Carlson's performance tied him with New England Patriots' kicker Nick Folk for leading the league in field goals made and field goals attempted in the 2021 season. In the regular season finale against the Los Angeles Chargers, Carlson made five field goals, including a game-winning 47-yard attempt as time expired in overtime. The Raiders would clinch a playoff spot and eliminate the Chargers from playoff contention.

==== 2022 season ====
In the 2022 season, Carlson converted 35-of-36 extra point attempts and 34-of-37 field goal attempts.

==== 2023 season ====
In the 2023 season, he converted all 32 extra point attempts and 26-of-30 field goal attempts.

==== 2024 season ====
In the 2024 season, he converted 23-of-25 extra point attempts and 34-of-40 field goal attempts.

==== 2025 season ====
In the 2025 season, Carlson converted 21 of 22 extra point attempts and 22 of 27 field goal attempts.

=== New Orleans Saints ===
On August 24, 2026, Carlson signed with the New Orleans Saints. He was released on November 3.

=== Miami Dolphins ===
On November 17, 2026, Carlson signed with the Miami Dolphins practice squad.

== Career statistics ==
=== NFL ===
Legend
	Led the league
**Bold**	Career high

==== Regular season ====
Year	Team	GP	Field goals				Extra points			Points
Year	Team	GP	FGA	FGM	Lng	Pct	XPA	XPM	Pct	Points
2018	MIN	2	4	1	48	25.0	6	6	**100.0**	9
2018	OAK	10	17	15	50	94.1	18	18	**100.0**	66
2019	OAK	16	26	19	48	73.1	36	34	94.4	91
2020	LV	16	35	33	54	**94.3**	**47**	**45**	95.7	144
2021	LV	17	**43**	**40**	56	93.0	33	30	90.9	**150**
2022	LV	17	37	34	57	91.9	36	35	97.2	137
2023	LV	17	30	26	54	86.7	32	32	**100.0**	110
2024	LV	17	40	34	54	85.0	25	23	92.0	125
2025	LV	17	27	22	**60**	81.5	22	21	95.5	87
2026	NO	7	12	8	58	66.7	18	16	88.9	40
Career		136	271	233	60	86.0	273	260	95.2	959

==== Postseason ====
Year	Team	GP	Field goals				Extra points			Points
Year	Team	GP	FGA	FGM	Lng	Pct	XPA	XPM	Pct	Points
2021	LV	1	4	4	47	100.0	1	1	100.0	13
Career		1	4	4	47	100.0	1	1	100.0	13

=== College ===
Year	School	Conf	Class	Pos	G	Kicking							Punting		
Year	School	Conf	Class	Pos	G	**XPM**	**XPA**	**XP%**	**FGM**	**FGA**	**FG%**	**Pts**	**Punts**	**Yds**	**Avg**
2014	Auburn	SEC	FR	K	13	57	57	100.0	18	24	75.0	111	8	317	39.6
2015	Auburn	SEC	SO	K	13	40	40	100.0	23	27	85.2	109	0	0	
2016	Auburn	SEC	JR	K	13	44	44	100.0	28	32	87.5	128	0	0	
2017	Auburn	SEC	SR	K	14	57	57	100.0	23	31	74.2	126	0	0	
**Career**	**Auburn**					**198**	**198**	**100.0**	**92**	**114**	**80.7**	**474**	**8**	**317**	**39.6**

== Career highlights ==
NFL

- First-team All-Pro (2022)
- Second-team All-Pro (2021)
- 2× NFL scoring co-leader (2020 (Note: Tied with Younghoe Koo and Jason Sanders.), 2021 (Note: Tied with Nick Folk.))
- Las Vegas Raiders record most 50+ yard field goals made in a single season (11, 2022)

College

- 2× SEC Special Teams Player of the Year (2016, 2017)
- 3× Second-team All-American (2015–2017)
- 3× First-team All-SEC (2015–2017)

== Personal life ==
Carlson is the brother of placekicker Anders Carlson. Carlson is a Christian. He married Katherine Barker on January 13, 2018, in Birmingham, Alabama. They met during their time at Auburn. They have three children.
