= Athena Kuehn =

American soccer player

Personal information
- Full name: Athena Marie Kuehn
- Date of birth: July 27, 1999 (age 27)
- Place of birth: Las Vegas, Nevada, United States
- Height: 1.70 m (5 ft 7 in)
- Position: Defender

Team information
- Current team: YB Frauen
- Number: 12

College career
Years	Team	Apps	(Gls)
2017–2020	Minnesota Golden Gophers	73	(3)
2021	LSU Tigers	20	(3)

Senior career*
Years	Team	Apps	(Gls)
2022	Gintra		
2022–23	Sporting de Huelva	22	(0)
2023–2026	YB Frauen	76	(6)
- * Club domestic league appearances and goals as of March 3, 2024

Athena Marie Kuehn (German: Kühn; born July 27, 1999) is an American former soccer player who played for Gintra, Sporting de Huelva, and BSC YB Frauen before her retirement on 1 July 2026.

== Personal life ==
Kuehn was born in Las Vegas on July 27, 1999, to Shay and Bernhard Kuehn and has a younger sister, Lola. She was raised in Colorado Springs, Colorado and attended Pine Creek High School, where she played in soccer, track, and cross country.

Kuehn holds dual citizenship with the United States and Germany; her grandparents are German citizens living in the United States.

== Career ==
=== University ===
Kuehn played for University of Minnesota for four seasons, serving as the team captain in her final season. During her tenure, she scored three goals, three assists, and nine points total. In 2018, the team received a Big Ten Tournament title.

She then joined the Louisiana State University soccer team for the fall 2021 season. While there, she scored three goals, three assists, and nine points total.

=== Professional ===
In early 2022, Kuehn signed with FC Gintra and later signed with Sporting de Huelva.

== Honors ==
While at Pine Creek High School, Kuehn competed in four Colorado State Cup championships from 2013–16. Her senior year, she received all-conference and all-state honors.
