= Aspen Valley High School =

American high school in Colorado

Location
- 1450 Chapel Hills Dr; Colorado Springs, Colorado 80920; United States; 38°57′05″N 104°47′27″W

Information
- School type: Coeducational public high school
- School district: Academy School District 20
- CEEB code: 060262
- Principal: Kita Grinberg
- Staff: 20.00 (FTE)
- Grades: 9-12
- Enrollment: 543 (2026-2027)
- Student to teacher ratio: 12 to 1
- Language: English ASL
- Mascot: Puma
- Website: aspenvalley.asd20.org

Aspen Valley High School is a grade 9 to 12 public alternative high school within Academy School District 20 in Colorado Springs, Colorado in the United States.

== See also ==
- Academy School District 20
