= Pine Creek High School =

Public high school in Colorado Springs

- Face of the school

Location
- 10750 Thunder Mountain Avenue; Colorado Springs, Colorado 80908; United States; 38°59′13″N 104°45′47″W

Information
- School type: Public high school
- Established: 1998 (28 years ago)
- School district: Academy 20
- CEEB code: 060316
- NCES School ID: 080192001645
- Principal: Tracie Cormaney
- Teaching staff: 99.58 (on an FTE basis)
- Grades: 9–12
- Enrollment: 1,875 (2024–2025)
- Student to teacher ratio: 18.83
- Colors: Blue, green and white
- Athletics conference: CHSAA
- Mascot: Eagle
- Feeder schools: Challenger Middle School; Chinook Trail Middle School
- Website: pinecreek.asd20.org

Pine Creek High School (PCHS) is a public high school in Academy School District 20 that serves the Pine Creek, Gleneagle, Black Forest, Northgate, Cordera, and Flying Horse Ranch neighborhoods of north Colorado Springs, Colorado. The school opened in 1998.

== Notable alumni ==
- Athena Kuehn (born 1999), professional soccer player
- Ally Watt (born 1997), professional soccer player
- JoJo Domann (born 1997), professional football player
- Dario Hunt (born 1989), basketball player for Hapoel Haifa of the Israeli Basketball Premier League
- Brandon Carlo (born 1996), professional hockey player
- Sam Vines (born 1999), professional association football player
