= Anders Carlson (American football) =

American football player (born 1998)

Profile
- Position: Placekicker

Personal information
- Born: June 16, 1998 (age 28); Colorado Springs, Colorado, U.S.
- Listed height: 6 ft 5 in (1.96 m)
- Listed weight: 219 lb (99 kg)

Career information
- High school: The Classical Academy (Colorado Springs)
- College: Auburn (2017–2022)
- NFL draft: 2023: 6th round, 207th overall pick

Career history
- Green Bay Packers (2023); San Francisco 49ers (2024); New York Jets (2024); Birmingham Stallions (2026)

Awards and highlights
- Second-team All-American (2020); First-team All-SEC (2020)

Career NFL statistics
- Field goals: 40
- Field goal attempts: 48
- Field goal %: 83.3
- Longest field goal: 58
- Touchbacks: 38
- Stats at Pro Football Reference

Anders Bjorn Carlson (ON-dərs bee-YORN; born June 16, 1998) is an American professional football kicker. He played college football for the Auburn Tigers, and was selected by the Green Bay Packers in the sixth round of the 2023 NFL draft. As a placekicker, he has been recognized as both a high school and collegiate All-American as well as an All-Southeastern Conference (SEC) First Team and Lou Groza Award semifinalist selection.

== Early life ==
Carlson attended and played football, soccer, and basketball at The Classical Academy (Titans) in Colorado Springs, Colorado. In 2014, as a sophomore, he made four of six field goal attempts with a long of 44 yards, as well as nine out of 10 extra-point attempts (PATs). In 2015, as a junior, he made 11 of 18 field goal attempts with a long of 52 yards, and 37 of 38 PATs. In 2016, as a senior, he made 13 of 23 field goal attempts, including a long of 51 yards, and all 49 of his PATs.

Carlson was invited to and played in the 2017 Under Armour All-America Game. A three-star college prospect was the highest-rated prep kicker recruit in the nation coming out of high school. ESPN rated him a top-10 overall recruit prospect in the state of Colorado. He committed to play college football for the Auburn Tigers over scholarship offers from Oklahoma State and Vanderbilt.

As a soccer player, Carlson helped the Titans to the 2014 and 2015 Class 4A State finals.

== College career ==
=== 2017 season ===
In 2017, Carlson redshirted his true freshman football season at Auburn as he served as the backup placekicker to his older brother, Daniel.

=== 2018 season ===
In 2018, prior to his redshirt freshman, Carlson gained attention after kicking a 62-yard field goal at Auburn's practice facility. That season, he successfully converted 15 of 25 field goal attempts, including two 53-yard field goals, which were the second-longest field goals made in Auburn program history by a freshman. He also converted all 44 PATs, including going 9-for-9 in the 2018 Music City Bowl against Purdue. He further forced 51 touchbacks on 70 total kickoffs. On November 24, 2018, against in-state rival Alabama, he recorded his first and only career reception, a 3-yard catch on a fake field goal play.

=== 2019 season ===
In 2019, Carlson entered his redshirt sophomore season as an SEC Media Preseason All-Southeastern Conference (SEC) Second Team and SEC Coaches Preseason All-SEC Third Team placekicker. He earned SEC Special Teams Player of the Week honors after making all four of his field goal attempts – from 43 (twice), 44, and 52 yards – in Auburn’s 48–45 upset win over Alabama in the “Iron Bowl.” His 52-yard field goal attempt against Alabama tied his brother, Daniel, and Al Del Greco, for Auburn’s longest field goal ever in Iron Bowl history. His third PAT made against Arkansas set an NCAA record for consecutive successful PATs (303) by Auburn kickers; a streak started by former Auburn kicker, Cody Parkey, in 2013 and that spanned six seasons, 78 games, and five different Auburn kickers. He finished his 2019 campaign by making 18 out of 25 field goal attempts and 48 out of 49 PATs, as well as 47 touchbacks on 78 kickoffs.

=== 2020 season ===
In 2020, entering his redshirt junior season, Carlson was selected to the SEC Media Preseason All-SEC Third Team and the Phil Steele All-SEC Fourth Team. That season, he made 20 out of 22 field goal attempts, including a long of 50 yards, and 24 out of 25 PATs. He was twice selected to the Lou Groza “Star of the Week” list for his kicking efforts against Arkansas and Mississippi State.

His 2020 season performance earned him Lou Groza Award (best placekicker in college football) semifinalist, American Football Coaches Association (AFCA) FBS Coaches’ All-America Second Team, Phil Steele All-America Honorable Mention, and Associated Press (AP) All-SEC First Team honors.

=== 2021 season ===
In 2021, as a redshirt senior, he made 14 of 21 field goal attempts with a long of 49 yards, as well as 35 of 36 PATs. On November 13, in Auburn’s game against Mississippi State, he suffered a season-ending torn ACL.

Carlson’s career performance places him with the fifth-most points (275), third-most field goals made (53), and sixth-most PATs made (116) in Auburn program history.

Carlson earned Special Teams MVP honors for Auburn’s 2018, 2019, and 2021 “A-Day” spring football games. Auburn's 2020 A-Day was cancelled due to the COVID-19 pandemic.

== Professional career ==
Pre-draft measurables
Height	Weight	Arm length	Hand span	Wingspan
6 ft 5 in (1.96 m)	218 lb (99 kg)	31 5/8 in (0.80 m)	9 1/2 in (0.24 m)	6 ft 4 3/8 in (1.94 m)
All values from NFL Combine

=== Green Bay Packers ===
==== 2023 season ====
Carlson was selected by the Green Bay Packers in the sixth round (207th overall) of the 2023 NFL draft. He signed his rookie contract on May 5.

In the Divisional Round playoff game against the San Francisco 49ers, Carlson missed a field goal which would have given the Packers a seven point lead and forced the 49ers to tie the game rather than take the lead. The Packers would end up losing 24–21, ending their season. Head coach Matt LaFleur and Carlson's Packer teammates came out in support of Carlson, with LaFleur stating that Carlson's missed kick was not the sole reason for the loss.

==== 2024 season ====
The Packers decided to bring in some competition for Carlson for in 2024, signing Jack Podlesny on January 24, 2024 and Greg Joseph on March 28. None of these players would end up making the final roster, and the Packers released Carlson on August 27, 2024. He would remain a free agent for the first six games of the season.

=== San Francisco 49ers ===
On October 15, 2024, the San Francisco 49ers signed Carlson to their practice squad, and elevated him to the active roster for their game against the Kansas City Chiefs on October 20. In this game, Carlson made both of his field goal attempts, including a then career-long 55-yarder. On November 5, the 49ers released him.

=== New York Jets ===
On November 8, 2024, Carlson was signed to the New York Jets' practice squad. He was elevated to the team's active roster for the game against the Indianapolis Colts on November 17. During this game, Carlson would beat his personal record again by kicking a 58-yard field goal. Carlson would remain the Jets kicker until he was designated inactive for the December 29 game, and he was released by the team the next day on December 30.

On January 14, 2025, Carlson signed a reserve/futures contract with the Jets. On June 18, Carlson was released by the Jets.

=== Birmingham Stallions ===
On April 14, 2026, Carlson signed with the Birmingham Stallions of the United Football League (UFL).

== Career statistics ==
=== NFL Regular season ===
Year	Team	GP	Field goals									Extra points			Total points
Year	Team	GP	FGM	FGA	FG%	<20	20−29	30−39	40−49	50+	Lng	XPM	XPA	XP%	Total points
2023	GB	17	27	33	81.8	0–0	6–6	14–14	4–8	3–5	53	34	39	87.2	115
2024	SF	2	5	5	100.0	0–0	1–1	0–0	2–2	2–2	55	3	4	75.0	18
2024	NYJ	5	8	10	80.0	0–0	2–2	2–2	3–5	1–1	58	9	11	81.8	33
Total		24	40	48	83.3	0–0	9–9	16–16	9–15	6–8	58	46	54	85.2	166
Source: pro-football-referencecom

=== NFL Postseason ===
Year	Team	GP	Field goals									Extra points			Total points
Year	Team	GP	FGM	FGA	FG%	<20	20−29	30−39	40−49	50+	Lng	XPM	XPA	XP%	Total points
2023	GB	2	2	3	66.7	0–0	2–2	0–0	0–1	0–0	29	7	8	87.5	13
Total		2	2	3	66.7	0–0	2–2	0–0	0–1	0–0	29	7	8	87.5	13
Source: pro-football-referencecom

=== UFL ===
Year	Team	GP	Field goals				Points
Year	Team	GP	FGA	FGM	Lng	Pct	Points
2026	BHAM	7	6	9	48	66.7	28
Career		7	6	9	48	66.7	28

== Personal life ==
Carlson was born to parents, Jodie and Hans, in Colorado Springs, Colorado. He has two brothers, Nils and Daniel. Daniel is the placekicker for the New Orleans Saints and was also an All-American kicker at Auburn.

In 2017, as a freshman at Auburn, he earned Academic Top Tiger and SEC First-Year Academic Honor Roll recognition. In both 2018 and 2019, he earned AD Honor Roll honors. He earned SEC Academic Honor Roll recognition every year from 2018 to 2020. In both 2019 and 2020, he earned CoSIDA Academic All-District honors. In 2020, he graduated from Auburn with a degree in aviation from the university's College of Business. He is now pursuing his master's degree.

Carlson is a Christian. He has said, "I think the biggest thing for me is just knowing my identity. I think for me, faith is a really big thing. My current thing I'm doing is football, but that's not who I am. I'm just focused on the things I can control, but knowing my identity is not in football, it's in God."
