= The Classical Academy (Colorado) =

Location
- Colorado Springs, Colorado; United States; 39°00′59″N 104°49′00″W

Information
- Type: Public Charter
- Motto: Excellence with Honor
- Established: 1997 (29 years ago)
- School district: Academy School District 20
- Principal: Aaron Walters, Justin Peterson, Amy Pope, Sean Shields, Hugh DiPretore, Erin Cook
- Head of school: Robert Thomason, President
- Grades: K-12
- Enrollment: High School: 618; Jr High: 469; Elementary: 2,152
- Campus type: Suburban
- Colors: Navy blue, maroon, silver
- Athletics: 3A/4A
- Mascot: Titan
- Website: www.tcatitans.org

The Classical Academy (TCA) is a kindergarten through twelfth grade public charter school located in northern Colorado Springs, Colorado, United States. It is chartered through Academy School District 20.

The school is known for having an extensive waiting list, with over 5,400 students on the current waiting list for all grades combined.

== Rankings ==
The Classical Academy High School is ranked #1 in Academy School District, 9th within Colorado, and #465 nationally (in the top 2%) by U.S. News & World Report.

Colorado's School Performance Framework rated TCA High School #2 in Colorado.

== Awards ==
In 2012, 2013, and 2014 the Colorado Department of Education awarded every TCA (elementary, junior high, and high school) as well as College Pathways the John Irwin Award for Academic Excellence. The John Irwin awards are given to schools that demonstrate excellent academic achievement.

== Campuses ==
The Classical Academy currently has three campuses in Northern Colorado Springs:

=== North Campus ===
The Classical Academy High School, The Classical Academy Junior High School and The Classical Academy North Elementary are located at 975 Stout Road. The North Campus is considered the main campus and is the location of the school administration offices.

=== Central Campus ===
The Classical Academy Central Elementary is located at 1655 Springcrest Road. This facility, formerly known as Mountain View School, was purchased by the TCA Building Corporation in 2004 for $1.9 million. Monthly payments continued until November 1, 2019, when the note was paid in full.

=== East Campus ===
The Classical Academy East Elementary is located at 12201 Cross Peak View (just west of Pikes Peak State College, Rampart Range Campus).

East Campus is also the location of the school's homeschool programs:

- The Cottage School Program for kindergarten through eighth grade.
- TCA College Pathways for seventh through twelfth grades. Students as part of this program also attend the adjacent Pikes Peak State College Rampart Range Campus.

== School uniforms ==
The school has a uniform policy for all grade levels.

== Admission and enrollment ==
The Classical Academy does not have open enrollment for students, nor is it an Academy School District 20 Choice option. The Classical Academy is a wait list school. Students are offered seats and admitted to the school based on their wait list position. Parents can apply from any of the surrounding fifteen school districts in and around Colorado Springs. Priority is given to students of administration, faculty, current enrolled siblings, and residents of Academy School District 20.

== Board of directors ==
The school is governed by a seven-member Board that is elected by the parents of students. These board members are volunteers. Terms are 3 years in length and, per Colorado election law, board members are limited to 2 consecutive terms.

== Titan of the Year Award ==
An annual award presented to a member of the staff who exemplifies the school's core values. Potential awardees can be nominated by students. Interviews of the Titan of the Year are conducted and posted on the TCA website.

Awardees

- 2025-26: Emily Hanenburg
- 2024-25: Sean Collins
- 2023-24: Sean Frawley
- 2022-23: Erin Yeadon
- 2021-22: Hugh DiPretore
- 2020-21: Linda Durck
- 2019-20: Lisa Kuyper
- 2018-19: Jessica Adair
- 2017-18: Nikki Upchurch
- 2016-17: Christina Schwartz-Soper
- 2015-16: Lora Hendricks
- 2014-15: Candus Muir
- 2013-14: Don Stump
- 2012-13: Brenda White
- 2011-12: Dr. Russ Sojourner
- 2010-11: John Knuth
- 2009-10: Diana Burditt
- 2008-09: Mindy Herd
- 2007-08: Sarah Myers
- 2006-07: Kay Goble
- 2005-06: Carrie Stedman
- 2004-05: Leesa Waliszewski
- 2003-04: Bobby Silva

== Athletics and activities ==
=== Athletics ===
High School sports include Baseball, Cross Country, football, Men’s Basketball, Men’s Golf, Men’s Soccer, Softball, Spirit/Cheer, Track, Volleyball, Women’s Basketball, Women’s Golf, Women’s Soccer, and Wrestling.

Junior High sports include Boys’ Basketball, Cross Country, football, Girls’ Basketball, Softball, Track, Volleyball, and Wrestling.

All of the main sports compete in Colorado's 3A athletic conference, except cross country, which competes at the 4A level as of 2012.

=== State championships ===
According to the Colorado High School Activities Association (CHSAA), The Classical Academy has won 53 team state championships.

==== Cross country ====
Girls Cross Country (18)

- 2003 (3A)
- 2004 (3A)
- 2005 (3A)
- 2006 (3A)
- 2007 (3A)
- 2008 (3A)
- 2009 (3A)
- 2010 (3A)
- 2011 (3A)
- 2012 (4A)
- 2018 (3A)
- 2019 (3A)
- 2020 (3A)
- 2021 (3A)
- 2023 (3A)
- 2024 (3A)
- 2025 (3A)
- 2026 (4A)

Boys Cross Country (10)

- 2004 (3A)
- 2006 (3A)
- 2008 (3A)
- 2010 (3A)
- 2011 (3A)
- 2017 (3A)
- 2021 (3A)
- 2022 (3A)
- 2023 (3A)
- 2025 (3A)

==== Track and field ====
Girls Track and Field (14)

- 2006 (3A)
- 2007 (3A)
- 2008 (3A)
- 2009 (3A)
- 2010 (3A)
- 2012 (3A)
- 2013 (3A)
- 2014 (3A)
- 2016 (4A)
- 2017 (3A)
- 2018 (3A)
- 2024 (3A)
- 2025 (3A)
- 2026 (3A)

Boys Track and Field (8)

- 2009 (3A)
- 2010 (3A)
- 2012 (3A)
- 2013 (3A)
- 2014 (3A)
- 2023 (3A)
- 2024 (3A)
- 2025 (3A)

==== Other team championships ====
- Girls Soccer (1): 2011 (3A)
- Boys Soccer (1): 2016 (4A)
- Football (1): 2024 (2A)
- Flag Football (2): 2025, 2026 (4A)

=== Marching band ===
The Classical Academy Marching Band has won the CBA (Colorado Bandmasters Association) state championship in Division 2A eight times, in 2017, 2018, 2021, 2022, 2023, 2024, 2025, and 2026.

=== Chess ===
The Classical Academy chess team has won the CSCA state 4A championship title three times, in 2010, 2011 and 2012.

== Notable alumni ==
Athletics

- Daniel Carlson – NFL Kicker
- Anders Carlson – NFL and UFL Kicker

== See also ==
- Colorado Springs Christian Schools
- The Vanguard School (Colorado)
