= Brandon Carlo =

American ice hockey player (born 1996)

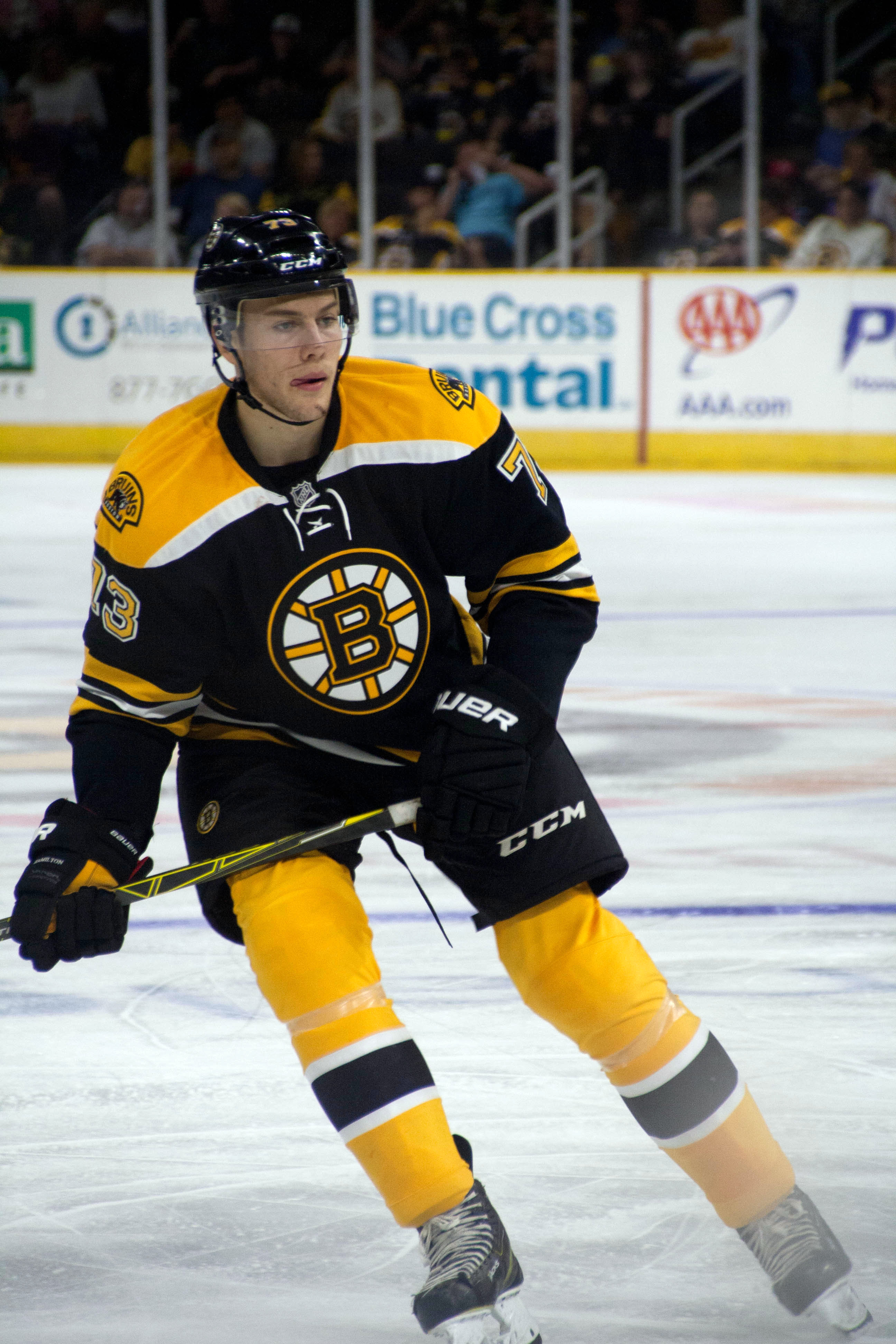
- Carlo with the Boston Bruins in 2015
- Born: November 26, 1996 (age 29) Colorado Springs, Colorado, U.S.
- Height: 6 ft 5 in (196 cm)
- Weight: 227 lb (103 kg; 16 st 3 lb)
- Position: Defense
- Shoots: Right
- NHL team Former teams: St. Louis Blues; Boston Bruins; Toronto Maple Leafs
- NHL draft: 37th overall, 2015; Boston Bruins
- Playing career: 2016–present

Brandon Mitchell Carlo (born November 26, 1996) is an American professional ice hockey player who is a defenseman for the St. Louis Blues of the National Hockey League (NHL). The Boston Bruins selected him in the second round, 37th overall, of the 2015 NHL entry draft. He played the first nine seasons of his career with the Bruins until his trade to the Toronto Maple Leafs in 2025.

Born and raised in Colorado Springs, Colorado, Carlo did not follow his older brothers into American football but instead played ice and street hockey with his neighbor. He spent five years of minor ice hockey with the Colorado Thunderbirds before joining the Tri-City Americans of the Western Hockey League (WHL) for the end of the 2012–13 season. After receiving praise from coach Jim Hiller during the 2013–14 season, Carlo was an assistant captain for the Americans over the next two seasons. When the 2015–16 season came to an end, he began his professional career with a brief stint for the Providence Bruins of the American Hockey League.

Carlo made the Bruins' opening night roster for the 2016–17 season, where he was paired with veteran captain Zdeno Chára. Chára was paired with Charlie McAvoy the following season, and Carlo found a new partner in Torey Krug. After injuries sidelined Carlo for what would have been his first two postseason appearances, he finally appeared for the Bruins in the 2019 Stanley Cup playoffs, helping Boston to a championship appearance against the St. Louis Blues. Both Chára and Krug left the Bruins after the 2019–20 season, and Carlo was paired with Matt Grzelcyk. He missed most of the 2020–21 season with multiple injuries, but returned in 2021–22 on a six-year contract extension with the Bruins.

== Early life ==
Carlo was born on November 26, 1996, in Colorado Springs, Colorado, the youngest child of Angie and Lenny Carlo. The Carlos' neighbors were an ice hockey family, and Brandon frequently played both ice and street hockey with their son. Always tall for his age, Carlo was a defenseman for his youth hockey teams. Carlo's older brothers played American football, and Carlo spent some time as a running back for a local team, but he preferred hockey. His hometown National Hockey League (NHL) team was the Colorado Avalanche, and Carlo's favorite player was Rob Blake.

Carlo played minor ice hockey with the Colorado Thunderbirds, who played an hour outside of Colorado Springs in Denver. In 2009, he participated in the Quebec International Pee-Wee Hockey Tournament with the Thunderbirds. Carlo spent five years with the Thunderbirds, and served as the team's captain during his last year, the 2012–13 season. That season, Carlo was Colorado's top-scoring defenseman: in 41 games, he had 10 goals and 47 points, as well as 58 penalty minutes. He also spent two seasons playing for his local team at Pine Creek High School while simultaneously commuting to Denver to play for the Thunderbirds.

== Playing career ==
=== Junior ===
The Tri-City Americans of the Western Hockey League (WHL) selected Carlo in the 10th round, 214th overall, of the 2011 WHL Bantam Draft. He joined the Americans for the end of the 2012–13 season, as he was limited to only six games with his junior ice hockey team. He made his WHL debut in the first game of the 2013 playoffs, scoring his first goal against the Spokane Chiefs. He appeared in all five playoff games for the Americans, who were eliminated by the Chiefs in the first round. Carlo returned to the Americans for a full rookie season in 2013–14. He was paired with several veteran defenseman throughout the first half of the season, and by the midway mark, he had two goals and two assists in 35 WHL games. In the second half of the season, he was paired predominantly with Mitch Topping and spent time on the Americans' penalty kill unit. He did not significantly contribute offensively, providing only three goals and 10 assists in 71 regular season games, but coach Jim Hiller praised Carlo's defensive abilities. In the 2014 WHL playoffs, Carlo contributed one assist in the Americans' first-round series against the Kelowna Rockets, which the Americans lost in five games.

Going into the 2014–15 season, Carlo was named one of three assistant captains for the Americans. After recording one goal, 10 points, and a +2 plus–minus rating through the first 23 games of the season, the NHL Central Scouting Bureau gave Carlo an "A" prospect rating in November, suggesting that he might be taken in the first round of the 2015 NHL entry draft. That January, he served as an alternate captain for the 2015 CHL/NHL Top Prospects Game. Shortly after, Carlo, who had already set career highs with 17 assists and 20 points through 41 games, was ranked the No. 16 prospect among all draft-eligible North American skaters. He missed three games in February with an upper-body injury but returned to finish the season, helping the Americans to clinch a berth in the 2015 WHL playoffs with a goal during their regular season finale against the Spokane Chiefs. Once again, Carlo and the Americans were eliminated in the first playoff round, dropping their series against the Rockets in four games. Carlo completed the 2014–15 season with a career-high 25 points (four goals and 21 assists) in 63 games, and the NHL Central Scouting Bureau ranked him No. 25 in their final pre-draft rankings. The Boston Bruins ultimately selected Carlo in the second round, 37th overall, of the 2015 NHL entry draft. His hometown team, the Avalanche, had hoped to use their no. 31 draft pick on him, but they ultimately traded that pick to the San Jose Sharks before the draft.

On September 25, 2015, the Bruins signed Carlo to a three-year, entry-level contract. After spending the preseason with Boston, Carlo returned to the Americans for the 2015–16 season, where he was once again an assistant captain. Despite missing some time in the first half of the season with an injury, Carlo had two goals and 12 assists in 22 games by the Americans' mid-season break, and he had a strong defensive showing with partner Parker Wotherspoon. He finished his final WHL season with five goals, 27 points, and 94 penalty minutes in 52 games. Despite Carlo scoring the game-winning goal in overtime to finish the regular season, the Americans fell short of clinching a playoff berth in 2016. He finished his junior hockey career with 11 goals and 54 assists in 186 WHL games.

=== Professional ===
==== Boston Bruins (2016–2025) ====
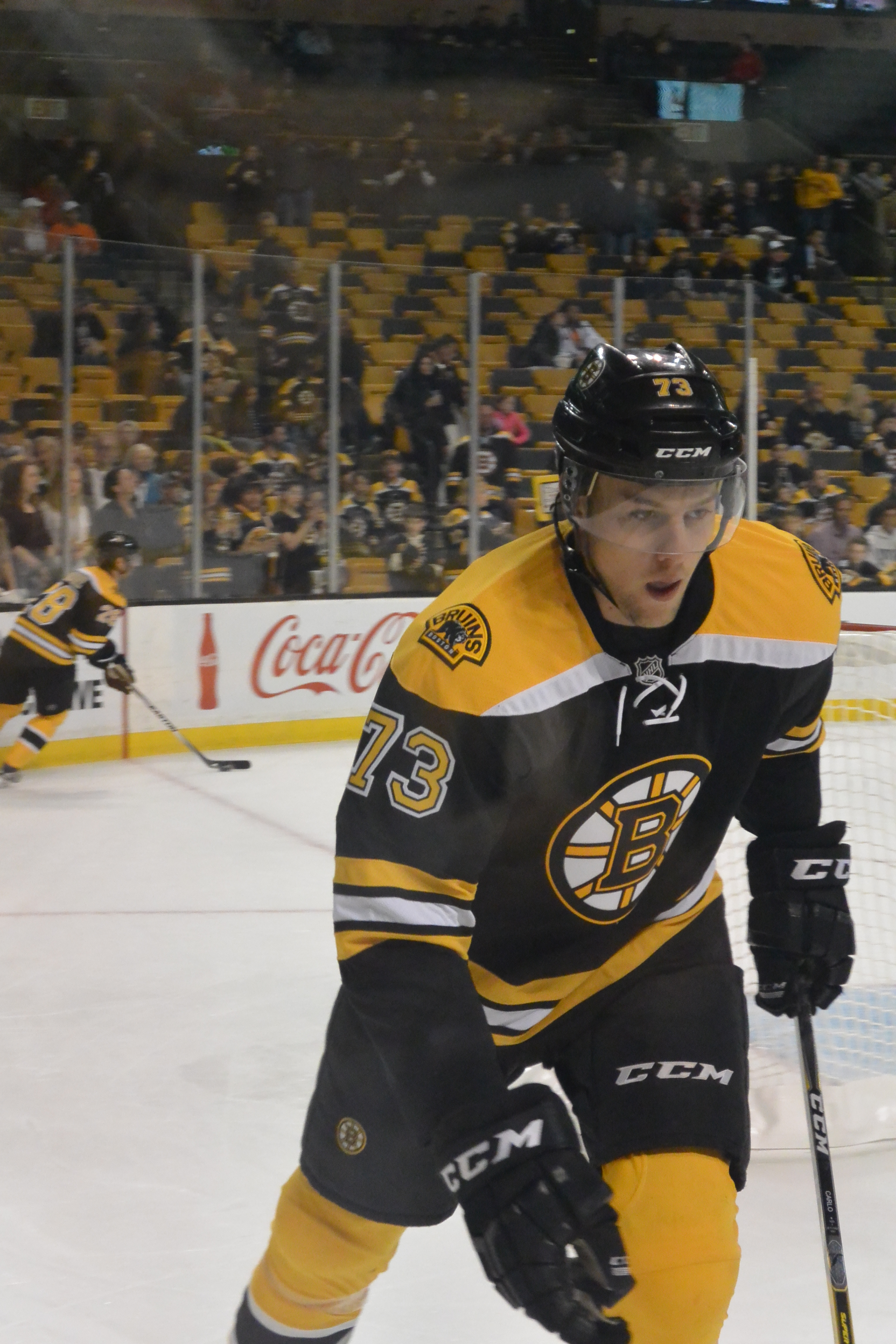
Carlo with the Bruins in 2016

Once his time with the Americans came to an end, Carlo began his professional career, joining the Providence Bruins, Boston's American Hockey League (AHL) affiliate, for the remainder of their 2015–16 season. He played in seven games at the end of their regular season, recording one assist and a +3 rating in the process. He also appeared in one playoff game before the Providence Bruins were eliminated from Calder Cup contention.

After a strong showing in training camp, Carlo made the Bruins' opening night roster for the 2016–17 season. He recorded his first NHL point in his debut, assisting on a goal in the Bruins' 6–3 victory over the Columbus Blue Jackets on October 13, 2016. Four days later, Carlo scored his first NHL goal in Boston's 4–1 win against the Winnipeg Jets. Carlo's first defensive partner in the NHL was Bruins captain Zdeno Chára, who was nearly 20 years his senior and was drafted five months before Carlo was born. When Chára was injured in November, Carlo was first paired with another veteran defenseman, John-Michael Liles, and then with Kevan Miller, and he spent the captain's absence gaining confidence without the large, physical Chara controlling play. Playing primarily on the first defensive pairing, Carlo received an average of 20 minutes and 48 seconds of ice time per game, and he contributed six goals and 16 points in 82 regular season games. The Bruins clinched a berth in the 2017 Stanley Cup playoffs, but Carlo was prevented from making his postseason debut after suffering a concussion during Boston's regular season finale. He missed the entirety of the Bruins' postseason run, as the Bruins lost their opening-round series against the Ottawa Senators in six games.

Entering the 2017–18 season, the Bruins paired Chára with another rookie defenseman, Charlie McAvoy, and Carlo was in turn partnered with Torey Krug. On the new pairing, Carlo's defensive performance was uneven, most notably during a February game against the Vancouver Canucks in which Carlo finished the night with a −4 rating. Overall, however, he finished the season with a +10 rating. On March 31, 2018, Carlo suffered a season-ending ankle fracture while battling for a puck in the Bruins' game against the Florida Panthers, keeping him out of postseason contention for the second year in a row. He finished his sophomore NHL season with six assists in 76 games and averaged 19 minutes and 15 seconds of ice time per game. The injury required surgical repair, and Carlo spent most of the off-season confined to a knee scooter.

Carlo entered the 2018–19 season on a defensive pairing with the newly acquired John Moore, another defensive defenseman that allowed Carlo to increase his offensive presence on the ice. He also returned to the top pairing with Chára early in the season while McAvoy was sidelined with an injury. He missed three weeks in November with a collarbone injury, returning on December 1 for the Bruins' 4–2 loss to the Detroit Red Wings. On December 14, 2018, Carlo scored his first goal in 116 games, providing a goal for the first time since March 4, 2017, in the Bruins' 5–3 loss to the Pittsburgh Penguins. In 72 regular season games, Carlo had two goals, 10 points, and a +22 rating. Finally healthy by the end of the regular season, Carlo made his playoff debut for the Bruins in game 1 of their first-round 2019 Stanley Cup playoffs series against the Toronto Maple Leafs. Although he did not score on the Bruins' path to the 2019 Stanley Cup Finals, Carlo contributed two assists in 17 postseason games and was +6 with 21 blocked shots through the Eastern Conference finals. Carlo finally scored in game 4 of the Stanley Cup Finals with a short-handed goal, but the Bruins lost the championship series in seven games to the St. Louis Blues.

A restricted free agent following the 2018–19 season, Carlo agreed to a two-year, $5.7 million contract with the Bruins on September 17, 2019. He began the 2019–20 season on the second defensive pairing with Krug, and he showed an offensive improvement in the first part of the season: through his first 35 games, he had already surpassed his previous season totals with three goals and 11 points. By the time that the NHL suspended the 2019–20 season on March 12 due to the COVID-19 pandemic, Carlo had four goals, 19 points, and a +16 rating, and the Bruins gave him the Eddie Shore Award for "exceptional hustle and determination" during their end-of-season banquet. He missed the last two games before the pause with a concussion after taking an elbow to the face from Evgenii Dadonov on March 5, and the season suspension allowed him time to recover. When the NHL resumed operations for the 2020 Stanley Cup playoffs in July, Carlo was one of 31 Bruins invited to play in the Toronto quarantine "bubble". The Bruins ultimately fell to the Tampa Bay Lightning in the Eastern Conference semifinals. Carlo was personally unhappy with his performance in the bubble, saying he "didn't feel good with [his] game at that point", and that his frustration with himself carried over between games.

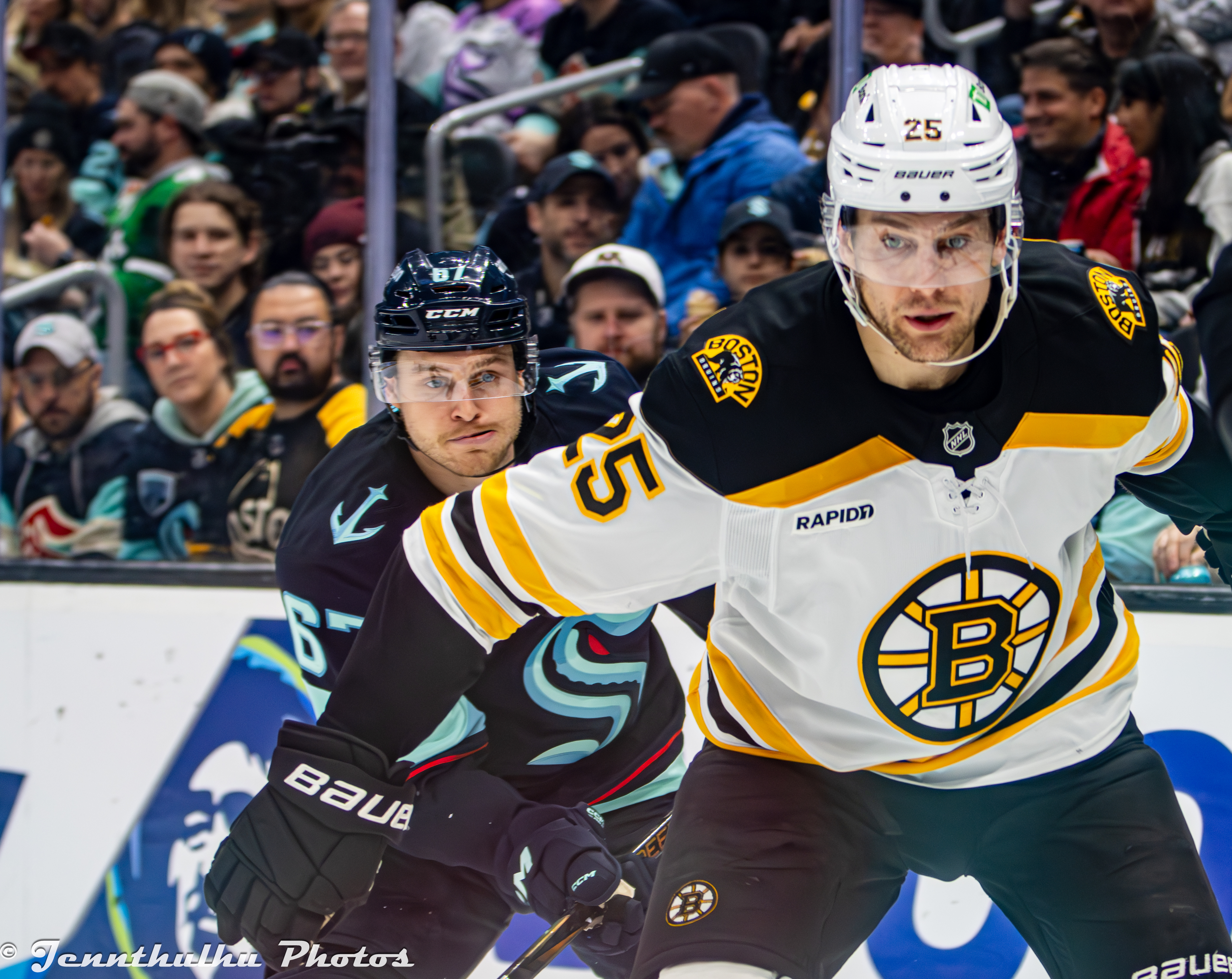
Carlo (right) during a game against the Seattle Kraken in December 2024

With both Chara and Krug leaving the Bruins before the 2020–21 season, Carlo was paired with newcomer Matt Grzelcyk on the second defensive line to start the year. When David Krejčí was injured in February, the Bruins selected Carlo to be a temporary alternate captain until his return. On March 5, 2021, Tom Wilson collided with Carlo during the Bruins' game against the Washington Capitals, causing Carlo to leave the game in an ambulance. Cassidy criticized the play as "a predatory hit" that targeted Carlo's head, and the NHL suspended Wilson for seven games. He returned at the end of March, but played only two games before suffering a new injury in the Bruins' April 3 game against the Penguins. After missing another 18 games, Carlo returned on May 4 for the Bruins' game against the New Jersey Devils. Limited to only 27 regular season games, Carlo had three goals and one assist in 2020–21. He appeared in an additional eight postseason games before the New York Islanders eliminated the Bruins in the second round of the 2021 Stanley Cup playoffs.

On July 14, 2021, two weeks before he would have become a restricted free agent, Carlo signed a six-year, $24.6 million contract extension with the Bruins.

Fresh off his new extension, Carlo was paired with Grzelcyk during the first stretch of the 2021–22 season. However, after struggling, Carlo was paired with Derek Forbort, while Grzelcyk joined McAvoy on the top line. Carlo was able to improve on his offensive numbers from the previous system, but more importantly, he was a stabilizing presence on the Bruins blue line. Carlo would tie his career highs in goals in the season, with six, as the Bruins were matched up against the Hurricanes in round 1 of the Stanley Cup playoffs. Although Carlo continued his blue line presence in the series, the Bruins would fall to the Hurricanes in seven games, ending their season.

To start the 2022–23 season, Carlo was paired up with Hampus Lindholm, hoping to provide a lockdown second pairing. However, in just the second game of the season, Carlo exited a game against the Arizona Coyotes early after seemingly hitting his head against the boards after a hit from Coyotes Liam O'Brien. The hit would keep him out of game action for a couple weeks. Before returning to game action on October 25, 2022, Carlo confirmed that he had suffered a concussion on the play, the fifth of his career. After returning, Carlo was able to hold down the blue line until he left a game early on January 19, 2023, against the New York Rangers after blocking a shot. Although initially concerning, Carlo returned to game action the next game, and would play an integral part on a Bruins team that broke the single-season record for wins and points. Carlo finished the regular season with three goals and 13 assists, and the Bruins would head into the playoffs with high expectations. However, they would suffer a historic collapse at the hands of the Florida Panthers, falling in seven games. In the series, Carlo played in every game, contributing with four assists.

Carlo once again was a defensive leader on the 2023–24 Bruins that were hoping to bounce back from their collapse the previous season. Although all started well, on January 8, 2024, Carlo left a game against the Colorado Avalanche early with an upper-body injury. Carlo would miss five games with the injury, which was later confirmed to be another concussion. Carlo would play the rest of the season, tallying four goals and 10 assists. In the Bruins first round matchup against the Maple Leafs, Carlo scored a goal and an assist, the latter of which came on David Pastrňák's Game 7 overtime winner. Carlo would score two goals in six games the following round against the Panthers, who once again ended the Bruins season.

Carlo entered the 2024–25 season as a second-pair defenseman once again, but would find himself in an extended role after injuries to Hampus Lindholm and Charlie McAvoy. However, the Bruins struggles to maintain consistent success throughout the season led to rumors that Carlo might be a possible trade piece.

==== Toronto Maple Leafs (2025–2026) ====
On March 7, 2025, Carlo was traded to the Toronto Maple Leafs in exchange for Fraser Minten, a conditional first-round pick (which was deferred as Toronto won the 1st overall pick in 2026) and a 2025 fourth-round pick, while the Bruins retained 15 percent of Carlo's contract.

Carlo scored three assists in 20 games for the Maple Leafs, who found themselves in a first-round matchup against the Ottawa Senators. After beating the Senators in six games, Carlo and the Leafs would face his former Boston Bruins teammate Brad Marchand and the Florida Panthers in the second round. The Panthers eliminated Toronto in seven games, marking the third consecutive season the Panthers eliminated Carlo's team from the playoffs. Carlo played all 13 games of the Leafs playoff run, being held pointless.

==== St. Louis Blues (2026-Present) ====
On June 27, 2026, the Toronto Maple Leafs traded Carlo to the St. Louis Blues in exchange for two third-round picks in the 2026 NHL draft.

== International play ==
Medal record

Representing United States

Men's ice hockey

IIHF World U20 Championship
Bronze medal – third place	2016 Finland	

Ivan Hlinka Memorial Tournament
Silver medal – second place	2013 Czech Republic/Slovakia	

Carlo first represented the United States in international competition when he skated with the under-18 team at the 2013 Ivan Hlinka Memorial Tournament in the Czech Republic and Slovakia. Team USA took a silver medal in the tournament, with Carlo skating in five games.

Two years after participating in the Ivan Hlinka tournament, Carlo was named to the United States junior team for the 2015 World Junior Ice Hockey Championships in Canada. Team USA failed to medal in the tournament, eliminated by Russia with a 3–2 loss in the quarterfinals, and Carlo had one assist in five games. Carlo rejoined the US junior team for the 2016 World Junior Ice Hockey Championship, where he took home the bronze medal in an 8–3 third-place rout of Sweden. Carlo finished the tournament with two goals and four points in seven games.

== Personal life ==
As of 2025, Carlo has two children with his wife, Mayson Corbett. Their daughter was born in 2021, and their son in 2024.

Carlo was raised in a non-denominational Christian household, and when he joined the Bruins, he began participating in a chapel group with several of his Boston teammates. He has a tattoo on his right forearm of 2 Corinthians 5:7, "Live by faith not by sight".

== Career statistics ==
=== Regular season and playoffs ===
			Regular season					Playoffs
Season	Team	League	GP	G	A	Pts	PIM	GP	G	A	Pts	PIM
2011–12	Colorado Thunderbirds 16U AAA	T1EHL	40	6	11	17	20	—	—	—	—	—
2012–13	Colorado Thunderbirds 16U AAA	T1EHL	41	10	37	47	58	—	—	—	—	—
2012–13	Tri-City Americans	WHL	—	—	—	—	—	5	1	0	1	2
2013–14	Tri-City Americans	WHL	71	3	10	13	66	5	0	1	1	8
2014–15	Tri-City Americans	WHL	63	4	21	25	90	4	0	1	1	4
2015–16	Tri-City Americans	WHL	52	5	22	27	94	—	—	—	—	—
2015–16	Providence Bruins	AHL	7	0	1	1	0	1	0	0	0	0
2016–17	Boston Bruins	NHL	82	6	10	16	59	—	—	—	—	—
2017–18	Boston Bruins	NHL	76	0	6	6	45	—	—	—	—	—
2018–19	Boston Bruins	NHL	72	2	8	10	47	24	2	2	4	6
2019–20	Boston Bruins	NHL	67	4	15	19	33	13	0	1	1	8
2020–21	Boston Bruins	NHL	27	3	1	4	12	8	0	0	0	4
2021–22	Boston Bruins	NHL	79	6	9	15	31	7	0	1	1	6
2022–23	Boston Bruins	NHL	75	3	13	16	38	7	0	4	4	4
2023–24	Boston Bruins	NHL	76	4	10	14	42	13	3	1	4	6
2024–25	Boston Bruins	NHL	63	1	8	9	24	—	—	—	—	—
2024–25	Toronto Maple Leafs	NHL	20	0	3	3	13	13	0	0	0	8
2025–26	Toronto Maple Leafs	NHL	55	0	7	7	37	—	—	—	—	—
NHL totals			692	29	90	119	381	85	5	9	14	42

=== International ===
Year	Team	Event	Result	GP	G	A	Pts	PIM
2013	United States	IH18	2nd place, silver medalist(s)	5	0	0	0	2
2015	United States	WJC	5th	5	0	1	1	0
2016	United States	WJC	3rd place, bronze medalist(s)	7	2	2	4	4
Junior totals				17	2	3	5	6

== Awards and honors ==
Award	Year	Ref
WHL
CHL/NHL Top Prospects Game	2015	
Boston Bruins
Eddie Shore Award	2020	
