= Liberty High School (Colorado) =

Location
- 8720 Scarborough Drive; Colorado Springs, Colorado 80920; United States; 38°57′31″N 104°44′9″W

Information
- School type: Public high school
- Motto: Give me a place to stand and I will move the earth
- Established: 1987 (39 years ago)
- School district: Academy 20
- CEEB code: 060287
- NCES School ID: 080192001429
- Principal: Matthew Sisson
- Teaching staff: 93.96 (on an FTE basis)
- Grades: 9–12
- Enrollment: 1,589 (2023–2024)
- Student to teacher ratio: 16.91
- Colors: Scarlet, navy, silver
- Athletics conference: CHSAA
- Mascot: Lancer
- Feeder schools: Chinook Trail Middle School; Timberview Middle School
- Website: liberty.asd20.org

Liberty High School (LHS) is a four-year public high school in northern Colorado Springs, Colorado, and part of Academy School District 20. It opened in 1987, and in the 2017–18 year, it had an enrollment of 1,650.

== Achievements ==
LHS is a member of the College Board and the National Association of College Admission Counseling, and is accredited by the North Central Association of Secondary Schools.

Advanced courses available include college preparatory courses, International Baccalaureate, and opportunities for Advanced Placement.
