= Kirk Hanna Park =

Park in Hanover, Colorado

Coordinates: 38°35′03″N 104°27′35″W

Kirk Hanna Park is a park in Hanover, Colorado, a rural district south-east of Colorado Springs. This park was the first project undertaken by the Hanover Community Park Board, formed in 1999.
