= Discovery Canyon Campus =

Location
- 1810 North Gate Boulevard; Colorado Springs, Colorado 80921; United States
- 39°1′48″N 104°47′48″W

Information
- School type: Public school
- Established: 2005; 21 years ago
- School district: Academy 20
- CEEB code: 060244 (High); 069035 (Middle)
- NCES School ID: 080192006631; 080192006616; 080192001905
- Principals: Stephen Scott (Elementary); Veronica Layman (Middle); Matt Mitchell (High)
- Teaching staff: 130.53 (on an FTE basis)
- Grades: P–12
- Gender: Coeducational
- Enrollment: 2,443 (2023–24)
- Student to teacher ratio: 18.72
- Campus type: City, Large
- Colors: Purple, gray, and black
- Athletics conference: Pikes Peak
- Mascot: Thunder
- Feeder schools: Antelope Trails Elementary School; The da Vinci Academy Elementary School
- Website: dcc.asd20.org

Discovery Canyon Campus (DCC) is a pre-kindergarten-12 school in Academy School District 20 in Colorado Springs, Colorado, United States. The campus is primarily dedicated to STEM courses. The campus serves the far north of Colorado Springs and is located off of the North Gate of the United States Air Force Academy.

The campus was opened in the fall of 2005 to 5th and 6th grade students. In the fall of 2006, this was expanded to grades PK-7. In 2007, 8th and 9th were opened, and the first graduating class of DCC walked across the stage four years later in May 2011.

The school offers the IB Primary Years Program, IB Middle Years Program, IB Career-related Program, and IB Diploma Program. DCC became an International Baccalaureate World School in May 2008.

The campus was designed by Antoine Predock.
