= Academy School District 20 =

School district in Colorado, United States

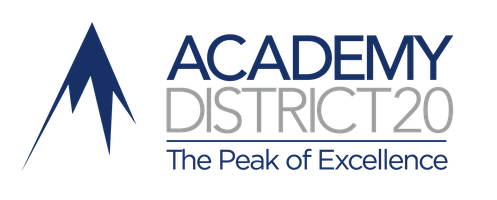

Address
- 1110 Chapel Hills Drive Colorado Springs, Colorado, 80920; United States
- Coordinates: 38.954869°N 104.791461°W

District information
- Motto: The peak of success
- Established: 1957; 69 years ago
- Superintendent: Dr. Susan Field (Interim)
- NCES District ID: 0801920

Students and staff
- Enrollment: 26,000 (approx) (2023–2024)
- Staff: 1,606.82 (on an FTE basis)
- Student–teacher ratio: 16:1

Other information
- Website: www.asd20.org

Academy District 20 is a school district located in El Paso County, Colorado. It is in the northern part of Colorado Springs, Colorado and the area surrounding the Air Force Academy.

In addition to USAFA, the district includes sections of Colorado Springs as well as the Gleneagle census-designated place, much of the Black Forest CDP, and a small piece of Monument.

== Governance ==
Academy District 20 has five elected Board of Education members, governing in a council-manager fashion, plus one non-voting liaison appointed by the U.S. Air Force Academy. These board members appoint the superintendent and approve budgets for the school district. The current Board of Education members are Susan Payne (President), Holly Tripp, Eddie Waldrep, Derrick Wilburn, and Kelli Hawkins, with Col. Gil Wyche II serving as the non-voting U.S. Air Force Academy liaison. Hawkins was appointed to the board on September 3, 2026, to fill the vacancy created by the resignation of Amy Shandy. She will serve the remainder of Shandy's term, which continues through November 2027. The current superintendent is Dr. Susan Field, the eleventh in the school district's history, who has served in an interim capacity since May 2026, pending selection of a permanent successor.

== List of schools ==
=== Elementary ===
- Academy Endeavour Elementary
- Academy International Elementary
- Antelope Trails Elementary
- Chinook Trail Elementary
- Discovery Canyon Campus Elementary (part of a K-12)
- Douglass Valley Elementary
- Edith Wolford Elementary
- Encompass Heights Elementary
- Explorer Elementary
- Foothills Elementary
- Frontier Elementary
- High Plains Elementary
- Legacy Peak Elementary
- Mountain View Elementary
- Pioneer Elementary
- Prairie Hills Elementary
- Ranch Creek Elementary
- Rockrimmon Elementary
- School in the Woods (Program)
- The da Vinci Academy
- Woodmen-Roberts Elementary

=== Middle ===
- Challenger Middle School
- Chinook Trail Middle School
- Discovery Canyon Campus Middle (part of K-12)
- Eagleview Middle School
- Home School Academy
- Mountain Ridge Middle School
- Timberview Middle School
- Village Middle School

=== High ===
- Air Academy High School
- Aspen Valley High School
- Discovery Canyon Campus
- Liberty High School
- Pine Creek High School
- Rampart High School
- Village High School

=== Charter ===
- The Classical Academy
- New Summit Charter Academy

== Sexual assault allegations ==
On August 28, 2023, Jose Garcia, a custodian at Mountain Ridge Middle School who had worked in Academy District 20 schools since 2019, was arrested, and criminally charged with three counts of sexual assault on a child. Following his arrest, Garcia would be placed on administrative leave.

On January 24, 2024, a federal lawsuit was filed against Academy School District 20 which alleged that the school district violated Title IX regulations when it did not immediately report an alleged sexual assault which occurred where a former female fifth grade student was groped by a male classmate at Woodmen-Roberts Elementary on January 25, 2022. The lawsuit also alleged that the school district also violated Title IX when it did not take sufficient steps to ensure the student's safety. Through juvenile criminal court, the accused boy would be criminal charged with two criminal counts, including charges of unlawful sexual conduct.

== See also ==
- List of school districts in Colorado
