= Gallop (disambiguation) =

A gallop is a gait of a horse or other equine animal, or a bounding gait of any 4-legged animal.

Gallop may also refer to:

== People ==
- Angela Gallop (born 1950), British forensic scientist
- Annabel Gallop (born 1961), British scholar and curator
- Armando Gallop (1970-1996), American house-music producer and DJ
- Cindy Gallop (born 1960), English CEO and advertising executive
- Clive Gallop (1892-1960), British engineer, racing driver, and military pilot
- Dave Gallop (born 1937), New Zealand cricketer and administrator
- David Gallop (born 1965), Australian sports administrator and lawyer
- Derek Gallop (born 1951), English former cricketer
- Frank Gallop (1900–1988), American radio and television personality
- Geoff Gallop (born 1951), Australian academic and former politician
- George Gallop (1590–1650), English politician and Member of Parliament
- Harold Gallop (1910-2006), Canadian middle-distance runner
- Henry Gallop (1857-1940), English cricketer
- Jane Gallop (born 1952), American professor
- Matt Gallop (born 1987), New Zealand professional bowler
- Richard Gallop (1808–1899), early Australian settler
- Sammy Gallop (1915–1971), American lyricist
- Shari Gallop, New Zealand marine environmental scientist
- Tom Gallop, American actor

== Arts and entertainment ==
- Gallop (studio), a Japanese animation studio
- Gallops (1898) and Gallops II (1903), books by David Gray
- Gallops (play), 1906 play based on the books by David Gray
- Heavy metal gallop, a metal drum beat typically using a double kick pedal
- The Japanese name for the Pokémon Rapidash

== Other uses ==
- Operation Gallop, a World War II Soviet Army operation in 1943
- Gallop Botanic Reserve, Cooktown, Shire of Cook, Queensland, Australia
- Gallops (band), an experimental rock band from Wales
- Gallops Island, Boston harbor, Massachusetts, United States
- Galloping (wind), vibrations in an object caused by wind
- Gish gallop, a rhetorical technique.
- Gallop (transit), a transit service in Greeley, Colorado, United States

== See also ==
- Conductor gallop, wind-induced low frequency oscillation of overhead transmission lines
- Gallop, Johnson & Neuman, L.C., the St. Louis-based law firm
- Galop, lively country dance, and music composed for such entertainment
- Gallup (disambiguation)
- Gallup (surname)
