= Gallup =

Gallup may refer to:

- Gallup, Inc., a firm founded by George Gallup, well known for its opinion poll
- Gallup (surname), a surname
- Gallup, New Mexico, a city in New Mexico, United States
  - Gallup station, an Amtrak train in downtown Gallup, New Mexico
- Gallup International Association, a group of polling organizations registered in Zurich, Switzerland
- USS Gallup, various ships of the United States Navy
- Gallup Korea, a South Korean research company founded by Park Moo-ik

== See also ==
- Gallop (disambiguation)
- Gallup & Robinson, a marketing research company
- George H. Gallup House, a historic house in Jefferson, Iowa, United States
