= Gallup (surname) =

Gallup is a surname of English origin. Notable people with the surname include:

- Albert Gallup (1796–1851), American politician
- Alec Gallup (1928–2009), American pollster
- Annie Gallup, American singer and songwriter
- Barry Gallup, American football coach
- Caroline Gallup Reed (1821-1914), American educator
- Cliff Gallup (1930–1988), American guitarist
- David Gallup (1808–1882), American politician
- Dick Gallup (1941-2021), American poet
- Donald Gallup (1913-2000), American bibliographer and curator
- Elizabeth Wells Gallup (1848–1934), American educator and scholar
- Felicity Gallup (born 1969), British badminton player
- George Gallup (1901–1984), American pollster, creator of the Gallup Poll
- George Gallup Jr. (1930–2011), American pollster, writer, and executive
- Gordon G. Gallup (1941–2026), American psychologist
- Harvey A. Gallup (1869–1946), American politician
- John Gallup (1619-1675), English militia captain and early American settler
- John Luke Gallup (born 1962), American economist
- Lee Gallup (1896–1995), American politician
- Michael Gallup (born 1996), American football player
- Morris E. Gallup (1825–1893), American politician from Ohio
- Simon Gallup (born 1960), British musician and bass guitarist
- William H. Gallup, American politician, member of the 111th and 112th New York State Legislature
- William Harrison Gallup (1840–1929), American politician

== See also ==
- Gallop (disambiguation)
