= Gallop (transit) =

Transit operator in Colorado

- Headquarters: 101 11th Avenue; Greeley, Colorado
- Locale: Greeley, Colorado
- Service type: Bus, paratransit
- Routes: 7
- Fuel type: Diesel, compressed natural gas
- Website: greeleyco.gov

Gallop is the municipal public transit agency serving Greeley, Colorado, and nearby communities in Weld and Larimer Counties. Operated by the City of Greeley, the system comprises seven bus routes and paratransit service. The agency was known as Greeley–Evans Transit (GET) until rebranding as Gallop in August 2026.

== History ==
The City of Greeley operated the system as Greeley–Evans Transit (GET) until August 2026, when it was rebranded as Gallop. The rebranding program was funded by Lamar Advertising in exchange for a 10-year advertising contract for buses and bus stop shelters. Other options for the name included NoCo Motiv and SYNC.

== Services ==
A Gallop Poudre Express bus after the 2026 rebrand.

Gallop operates local fixed-route buses, paratransit, and regional bus service. Gallop has operated the Boomerang, the free campus shuttle for the University of Northern Colorado, since its introduction in 2002.

The Poudre Express, a regional bus service between Greeley and Fort Collins via Windsor, began on January 2, 2020.

Gallop's local routes and the Poudre Express serve the Greeley Regional Transit Center, a central hub serving as a transfer point for the system.

=== Routes ===
Route	Service Area	Service type
1	Regional Transit Center - Aims Community College - Greeley West High School - Greeley Mall	Local
2	Greeley Mall - Riverside Library - University Square	Local
3	Regional Transit Center - Westlake Village - Greeley West High School - Greeley Mall	Local
4	Regional Transit Center - North Colorado Medical Center - Greeley Mall	Local
5	Regional Transit Center - Weld Human Services - Weld Health Department - Guadalupe Apartments - Lincoln Park - City Hall - University of Northern Colorado - Hillside Center - Greeley Mall	Local
Boomerang	University of Northern Colorado campus: Gunter Hall - Michener Library - Wiebking Hall	Campus shuttle
Poudre Express	Greeley - Windsor - Fort Collins - Colorado State University	Regional

== See also ==
- List of bus transit systems in the United States
