= SS John Gallup =

Liberty ship of WWII

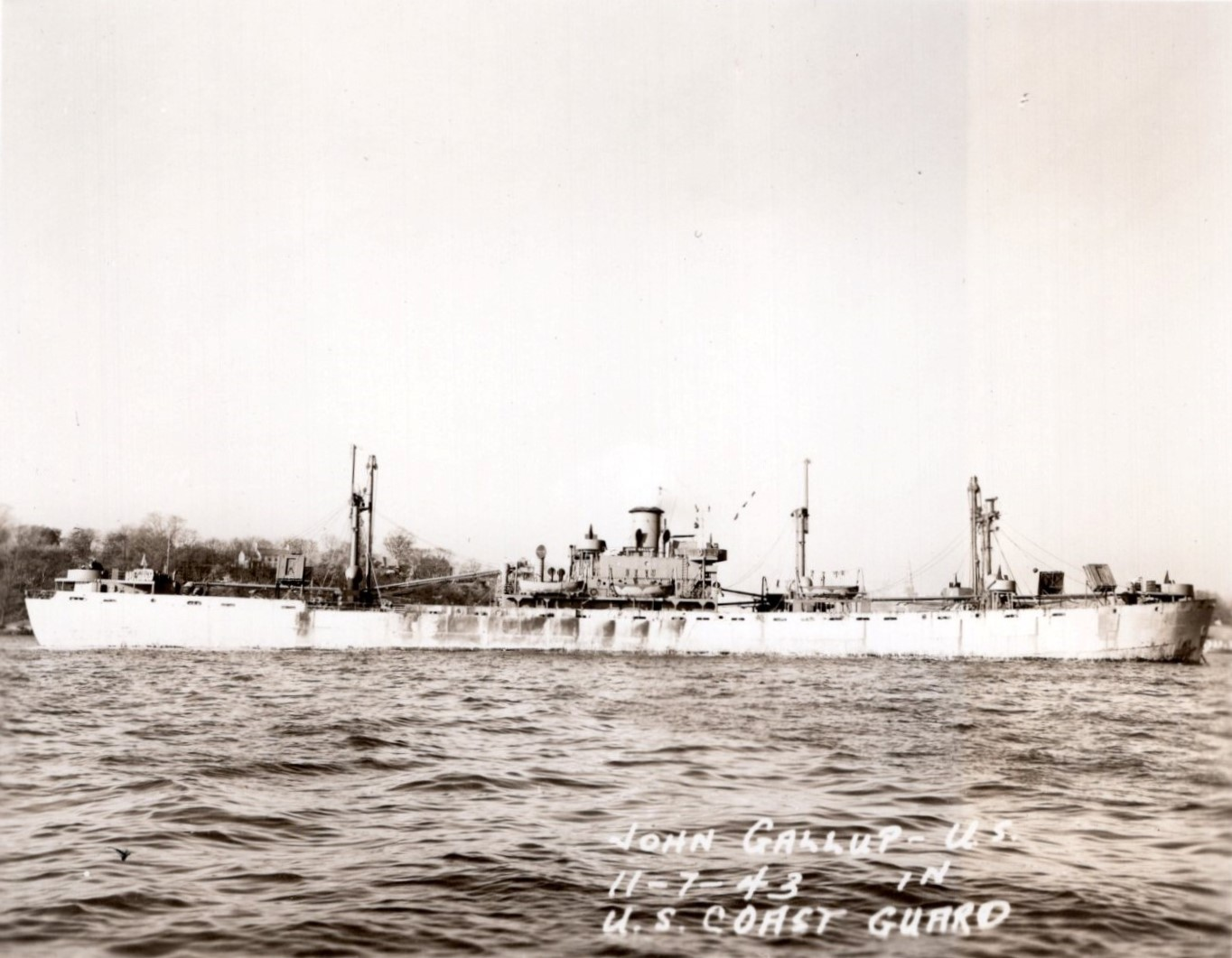
- Liberty SS John Gallup, 7 November 1943

History

United States
- Name: John Gallup
- Namesake: John Gallup
- Owner: War Shipping Administration (WSA)
- Operator: Smith & Johnson Inc.
- Ordered: as type (EC2-S-C1) hull, MCE hull 951
- Awarded: 30 January 1942
- Builder: Bethlehem-Fairfield Shipyard, Baltimore, Maryland
- Cost: $1,067,101
- Yard number: 2101
- Way number: 6
- Laid down: 27 January 1943
- Launched: 3 March 1943
- Sponsored by: Mrs. Bruce Gallup
- Completed: 18 March 1943
- Identification: Call sign: KKKN
- Fate: Laid up in reserve fleet, 22 April 1952, sold for scrapping, 23 July 1963

General characteristics
- Class & type: Liberty ship; type EC2-S-C1, standard
- Tonnage: 10,865 LT DWT; 7,176 GRT
- Displacement: 3,380 long tons (3,434 t) (light); 14,245 long tons (14,474 t) (max)
- Length: 441 feet 6 inches (135 m) oa; 416 feet (127 m) pp; 427 feet (130 m) lwl
- Beam: 57 feet (17 m)
- Draft: 27 ft 9.25 in (8.4646 m)
- Installed power: 2 × Oil fired 450 °F (232 °C) boilers, operating at 220 psi (1,500 kPa); 2,500 hp (1,900 kW)
- Propulsion: 1 × triple-expansion steam engine, (manufactured by General Machinery Corp., Hamilton, Ohio); 1 × screw propeller
- Speed: 11.5 knots (21.3 km/h; 13.2 mph)
- Capacity: 562,608 cubic feet (15,931 m^{3}) (grain); 499,573 cubic feet (14,146 m^{3}) (bale)
- Complement: 38–62 USMM; 21–40 USNAG
- Armament: Varied by ship; Bow-mounted 3-inch (76 mm)/50-caliber gun; Stern-mounted 4-inch (102 mm)/50-caliber gun; 2–8 × single 20-millimeter (0.79 in) Oerlikon anti-aircraft (AA) cannons and/or, 2–8 × 37-millimeter (1.46 in) M1 AA guns

SS John Gallup was a Liberty ship built in the United States during World War II. She was named after John Gallup, an early settler and militia captain in Southeastern Connecticut, he was killed in battle during King Philip's War, in 1675.

== Construction ==
John Gallup was laid down on 27 January 1943, under a Maritime Commission (MARCOM) contract, MCE hull 951, by the Bethlehem-Fairfield Shipyard, Baltimore, Maryland; she was sponsored by Mrs. Bruce Gallup, and launched on 3 March 1943.

== History ==
She was allocated to the Smith & Johnson Inc., on 18 March 1943.

On 11 February 1948, she was first laid up in the James River Reserve Fleet, in Lee Hall, Virginia. On 22 April 1952, she was laid up in the Wilmington Reserve Fleet, in Wilmington, North Carolina. On 8 July 1963, she was sold for $45,116.32, to Union Minerals & Alloys Corp., to be scrapped. She was withdrawn from the fleet on 23 July 1963.

== Bibliography ==
- "Bethlehem-Fairfield, Baltimore MD". www.ShipbuildingHistory.com. 7 August 2021.
- Maritime Administration. "John Gallup". Ship History Database Vessel Status Card. U.S. Department of Transportation, Maritime Administration.
- Davies, James (May 2004). "Specifications (As-Built)" (PDF). p. 23.
- "SS John Gallup".
