= GJN =

GJN or gjn may refer to:

- Gallop, Johnson & Neuman, a defunct law firm based in St. Louis County, Missouri
- gjn, the ISO 639-3 code for Gonja language, Ghana
