= Claude Robinson =

Claude Robinson could be:

- Claude C. Robinson (1881 – 1976), a Canadian ice hockey and sports executive, and Hockey Hall of Fame inductee
- Claude E. Robinson (1900 – 1961), an American advertising researcher
