= Northern Colorado =

Coordinates: 40°00′N 105°30′W

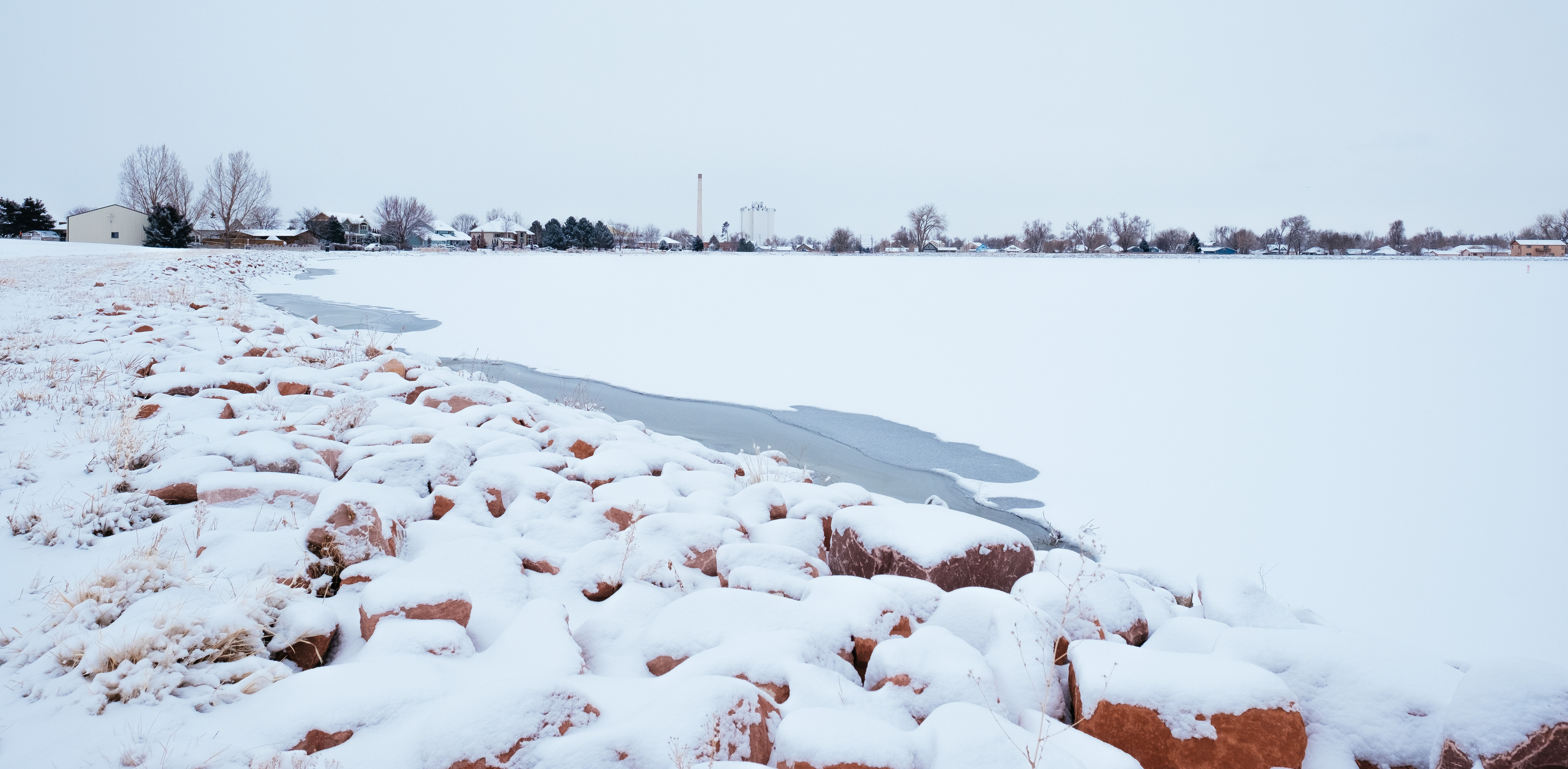
- Windsor, Colorado during the winter
- Country: United States
- State: Colorado

Area
  - Total: 6,651 sq mi (17,230 km^{2})
- (Larimer and Weld counties only, from Wikipedia)

Population
  - Estimate: 755,718

Northern Colorado is a region in the northern portion of Colorado, part of the larger Front Range Urban Corridor, typically defined as including Larimer County and Weld County and sometimes including Boulder County. The region is centered on the cities of Fort Collins and Greeley. It borders northwestern Colorado, northeastern Colorado, Central Colorado, and the southeastern portion of Wyoming. Northern Colorado receives over 300 days of sunshine per year and has a semi-arid climate. However, the parts located in upper elevations of the Rocky Mountains receive 300 inches (760 cm) of snow per year and have an Alpine climate. The Colorado State University and the University of Northern Colorado are located in Northern Colorado. The region contains some of the fastest growing cities in Colorado.

== Notable Cities and Towns ==
- Loveland
- Fort Collins
- Greeley
- Windsor
- Estes Park
- Fort Lupton
- Timnath
- Wellington
- Berthoud
- Longmont
- Boulder

== Education ==
Notably, Northern Colorado is home to several of the state's largest universities:

=== Community/technical colleges ===
- Aims Community College (Greeley, Loveland, Windsor, Fort Lupton)
- Front Range Community College (Fort Collins, Longmont)
- Morgan Community College (Fort Morgan)

=== Four-year colleges/universities ===
- Colorado State University (Fort Collins)
- Naropa University (Boulder)
- University of Colorado-Boulder (Boulder)
- University of Northern Colorado (Greeley)

== Potential state ==
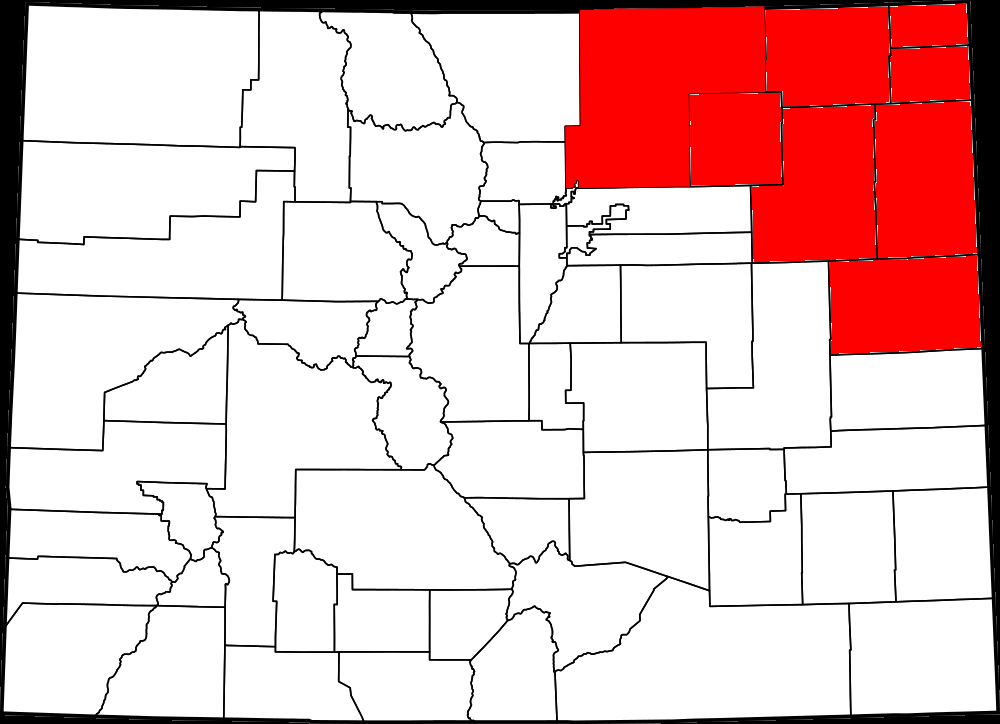
Counties involved in the proposed state of North Colorado.

North Colorado or Northern Colorado is a proposed new U.S. state which would consist of several counties in the northeast portion of Colorado and possible counties from Nebraska and Kansas.

A University of Colorado law professor has indicated that an additional step would be required beyond the approval of the state legislature and the U.S. Congress, as the Colorado Constitution defines the state's boundaries, thus requiring a vote on a constitutional amendment.

=== Background ===
A county commissioner of Weld County stated his belief that the county sends more oil and gas revenue to the state than it receives back for schools, roads, and other services. In 2013, the Democratic-controlled Colorado General Assembly passed tighter gun control laws, higher renewable energy reliance laws, and livestock treatment laws. A higher environmental standard oil and gas production law was narrowly defeated. During the debates over these laws, talk of secession began in the Eastern Plains area. At a meeting of the state's county commissioners in early June, a State House leader indicated that they would attempt to pass the oil environmental standards law again. This brought the secession discussion to a higher level with Weld County Commissioners Mike Freeman, Sean Conway, and Douglas Rademacher leading the proposal with a hearing scheduled regarding counties placing secession questions on the November 2013 ballot.

=== History ===
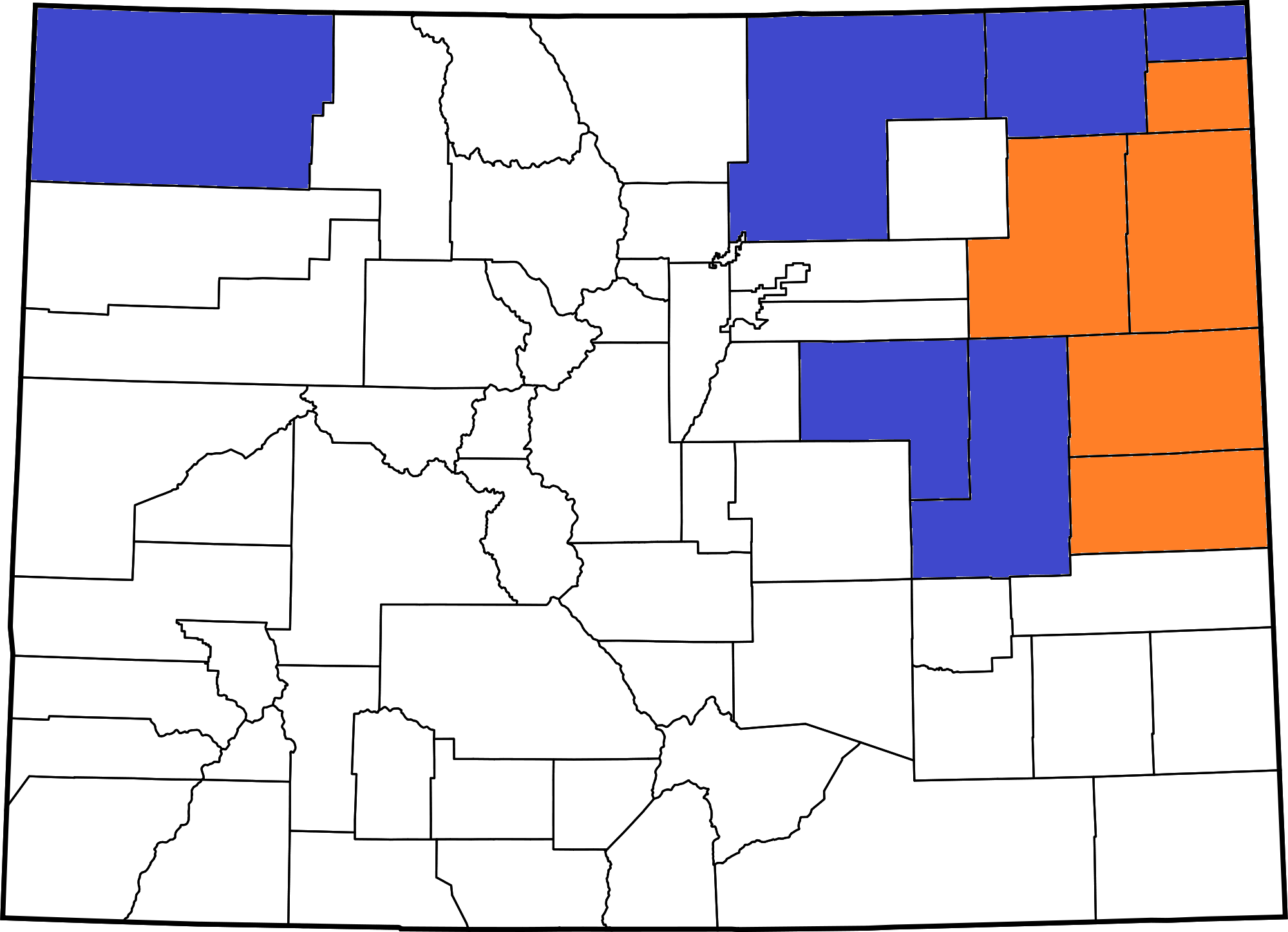
Eleven counties asked voters if they supported seceding from Colorado. Counties shown in orange voted in favor of secession; counties shown in blue voted against.

Along with Weld County, several other counties were invited to or interested in being involved with this proposal: Morgan, Logan, Sedgwick, Phillips, Washington, Yuma, and Kit Carson. Also interested in joining the new state are parts of Nebraska. Colorado's Eastern Plain counties all may possibly be involved in the split, but Larimer County Commissioners indicated that their county would not likely approve of a split.

On July 8, 2013, a meeting of representatives from 10 counties was held in Akron, Colorado to begin setting the boundaries of the potential state. The news media reported that some people in Lincoln and Cheyenne counties wish to join in forming the state. Additionally, the organizers reported that three other Colorado and two Kansas counties also wish to join in forming the state. The county commissioners involved discussed an alternative plan, if breaking away was not feasible, to change the Colorado Constitution to have one state senator per county.

Cheyenne County—outside the original proposed area— became the first county to refer the measure to the people on July 23, 2013. A total of eleven counties placed the measure on the November 5, 2013, ballot. Voters in Cheyenne, Kit Carson, Phillips, Washington, and Yuma counties approved the measure.

=== Counties ===
- Ballot initiative counties
  - Cheyenne
  - Elbert
  - Kit Carson^{i}
  - Lincoln
  - Logan^{i}
  - Moffat
  - Phillips^{i}
  - Sedgwick^{i}
  - Washington^{i}
  - Weld^{i}
  - Yuma^{i}
- Kansas counties - under consideration
  - Cheyenne
  - Wallace
- Other counties
  - Morgan^{i}

i. initial invited county
