= George H. Gallup House =

Historic house in Iowa, United States

- U.S. National Register of Historic Places
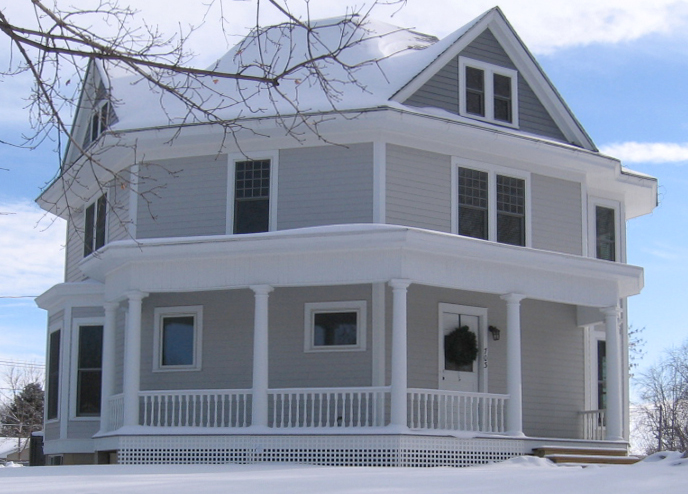

- Location within Iowa Location within the United States
- Location: 703 S. Chestnut St. Jefferson, Iowa
- Coordinates: 42°0′27″N 94°22′22″W
- Built: 1901-1902
- Architectural style: Classical Revival; Queen Anne
- NRHP reference No.: 85001581
- Added to NRHP: July 18, 1985

The George H. Gallup House is an historic octagonal house built in 1901 that is located at 703 South Chestnut Street in Jefferson, Iowa, United States. It was the birthplace and boyhood home of Dr. George Horace Gallup, the pioneer of public opinion polling. On July 18, 1985, it was listed on the National Register of Historic Places.

Dr. Gallup's father, George Henry Gallup, was committed to the octagon house, having built three of them. The first was built in 1893 on North Elm Street in Jefferson. It featured Queen Anne detailing, and it was somewhat asymmetrical because of its porch and bay placement. He sold this house in 1899 and began building a second one. Gallup began building his third and final octagon house in 1901 and completed it the following year. It was in this house that his son George was born and raised. The 2 1/2-story frame house is built on a rubble coursed stone foundation. Its eight sides are 16 feet (4.9 m) wide and covered with clapboard siding. The house is capped with a truncated octagonal roof.

== See also ==
- George Gallup
- Gallup & Robinson
- Gallup, Inc.
- Gallup Poll
- List of octagon houses
