= Gallops Island =

Island in Massachusetts, United States

Coordinates: 42°19′34.03″N 70°56′22.30″W

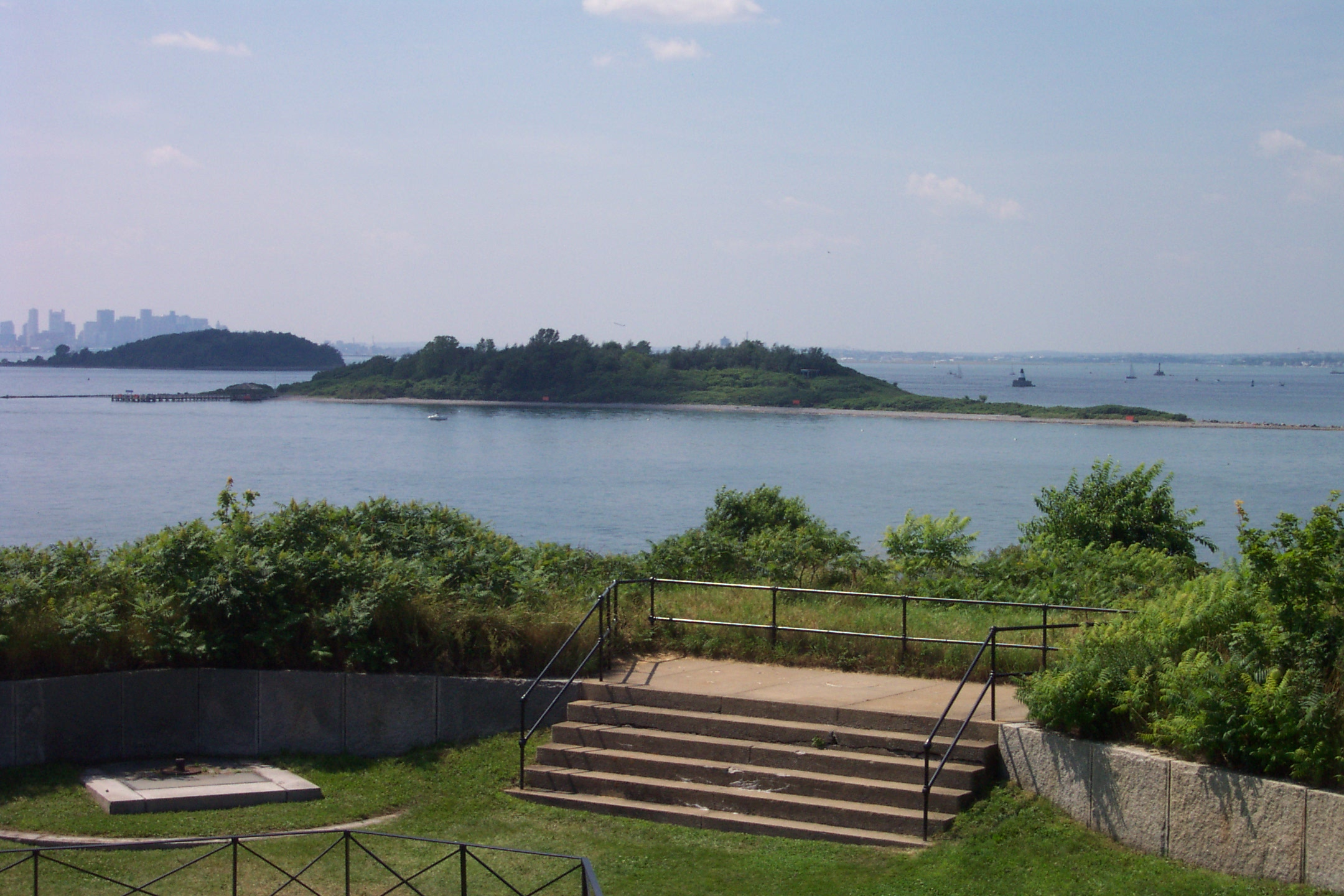
Gallops Island (center) as viewed from Fort Warren on Georges Island. The skyline of downtown Boston can be seen to the top left, over the tip of Long Island.

Gallops Island, also known as Gallups Island, is an island in the Boston Harbor Islands National Recreation Area. It is situated between Georges Island and Long Island, and is just over 6 miles (9.7 km) from downtown Boston. The island has a permanent size of 23 acres (93,000 m^{2}), plus an intertidal zone of a further 28 acres (110,000 m^{2}), and is composed of one large drumlin, reaching an elevation of 79 feet (24 m) above sea level. The island has a rocky beach and offers long vistas from the top of its grassy bluffs.

== Name ==
The island is named after John Gallop, one of Boston Harbor's first pilots, who purchased the island in the mid-1600s and lived there.

== History ==
Since the residency of John Gallop ended, the island has been occupied by a restaurant and inn and a quarantine station. During the Civil War the island was occupied by a military camp housing 3,000 Union soldiers. From the 1870s to early 1900s, the island was used for smallpox victims. An estimated 234 were buried on the island, mainly immigrants.

During World War I, Gallops Island was used as an infirmary for thousands of American soldiers who contracted "Spanish influenza" and pneumonia. Many died every day, to be replaced by new arrivals. During World War II it was occupied by a radio school and a school for bakers and cooks.

The island contains a collection of ornamental trees, shrubs and herbaceous plants that date back to its earlier uses, with additional trees being planted by the Civilian Conservation Corps in the 1930s. Photographs from the 1940s show that a tree lined street extended the length of the island. Although the buildings have been demolished, the pathways and foundations still exist and are lined with privet hedges and surrounded by fruit, shade and coniferous trees, including lilacs, mock-orange, snowberry, and forsythia. Also present are self-sown sumac, poplar, poison ivy, and bayberry. By the 2000s, the vegetation had been badly damaged by the island's population of rabbits.

The Massachusetts Department of Conservation and Recreation closed Gallops Island 2000 due to the presence of hazardous asbestos-containing building debris from former military uses. As of August 2010, it was predicting a re-opening no earlier than 2015, presuming asbestos remediation funding could be obtained.

In 2018, winter storms unearthed some of the smallpox victim graves. DCR planned to offer remains to any identifiable relatives, relocate veterans, and re-inter the remainder in Fairview Cemetery in Hyde Park.
