= Union Colony Civic Center =

Performing arts venue in Greeley, Colorado

Coordinates: 40.42587°N 104.69508°W

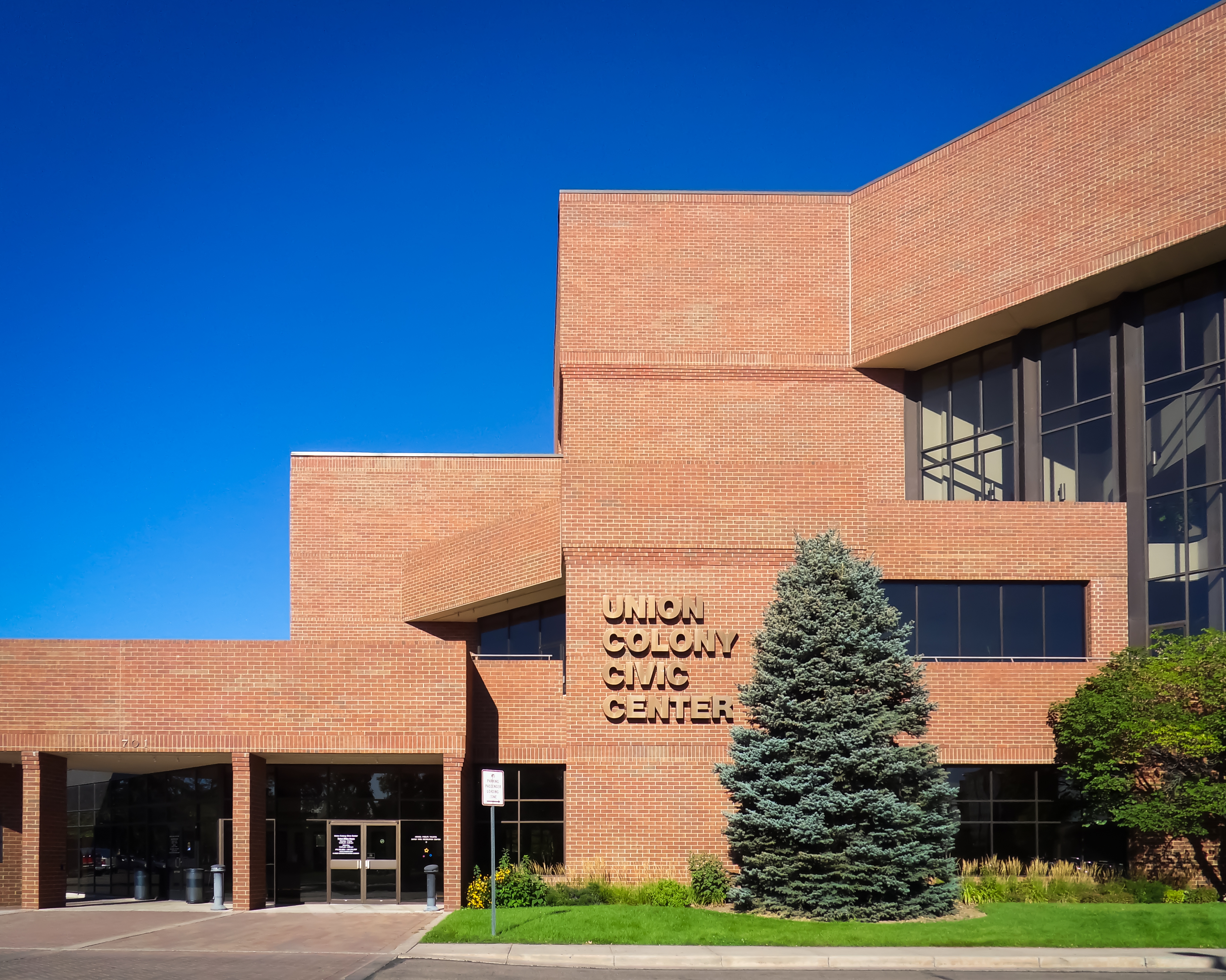
The Union Colony Civic Center

The Union Colony Civic Center (UCCC) is a performing arts venue in Greeley, Colorado that is owned and operated by the City of Greeley. Built in 1988, the UCCC is home to two performance venues, Monfort Concert Hall, which seats 1,686, and Hensel Phelps Theatre, which seats 214.

Hosting hundreds of events per year, the UCCC offers a wide variety of Broadway musicals, concerts, comedy shows and sponsors events held by the University of Northern Colorado, Greeley Philharmonic Orchestra, the Greeley Chorale and other local and regional productions.

In addition to the performing arts, the UCCC is home to the Tointon Gallery featuring a dozen exhibits annually by artists that are free to the public.
