= Lee Gallup =

American politician and farmer (1896–1995)

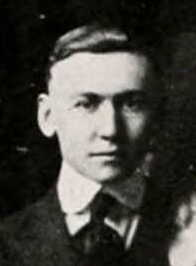
- Gallup in his 1919 college yearbook

Member of the Iowa House of Representatives from the 19th district
- In office January 10, 1949 – January 9, 1955
- Preceded by: Wilson Reed
- Succeeded by: LeRoy Wilfred Chalupa

Personal details
- Born: Fred Gallup; August 25, 1896 Jefferson County, Iowa, U.S.
- Died: October 7, 1995 (aged 99) Fairfield, Iowa, U.S.
- Party: Republican
- Spouses: Helen Parson (m. 1918; died 1922) Jessie Hoffman (m. 1925; died 1982) Larue Frieberg (m. 1983; died 1993)
- Children: 3

Fred "Lee" Gallup (August 25, 1896 – October 7, 1995) was an American politician and farmer. He served as the representative for the 19th district in the Iowa House of Representatives from 1949 to 1955.

== Early life and career ==
Fred Gallup was born on August 25, 1896, in Liberty Township in Jefferson County, Iowa, to William Kinney and Stella Thompson Gallup. He graduated from Birmingham High School and was a student at Iowa State College for two years.

He first married Helen Parson in 1918. They had their first child together, and Parson died a few hours later in 1922.

== Political career ==
Before the Iowa House of Representatives, Gallup served as a Libertyville, Iowa, township trustee and the mayor of Libertyville.

Gallup defeated the incumbent, Wilson Reed, in the Republican primary. He won against Democrat Wilbur J. Dole in the general election; Dole was unopposed in the Democratic primary. Gallup was assigned to a steering committee.

1948 Iowa's 19th House of Representatives district general election
Party	Candidate	Votes	%
Republican	Lee Gallup	4,055	61.60%
Democratic	J. Wilbur Dole	2,528	38.40%
Total votes		6,583	100.00%

== Personal life ==
Gallup was a Methodist and affiliated with the Knights of Pythias. He was the third cousin of statistician George Gallup. Gallup died on October 7, 1995.
