= Greeley Mall =

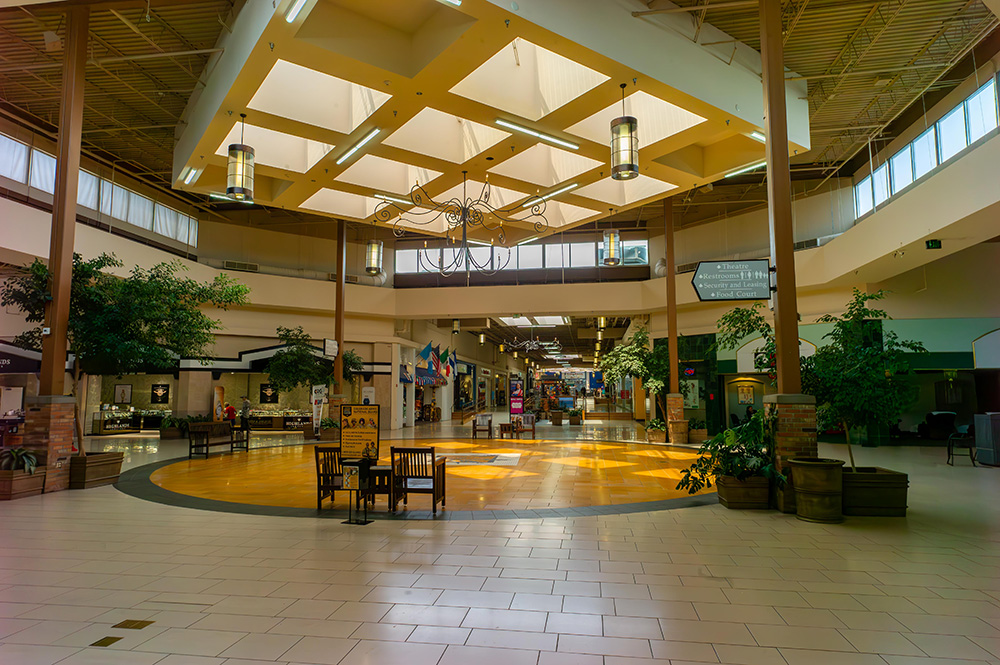
- Center court of Greely Mall
- Location: Greeley, Colorado, United States
- Address: 2050 Greeley Mall
- Opened: 1973
- Developer: Fulenwider Company
- Manager: Moonbeam Capital Investments
- Owner: Moonbeam Capital Investments
- Num. of stores: 70
- Num. of anchor tenants: 5 (2 open, 3 vacant)
- Floor area: 578,000 sq ft (53,700 m^{2})
- Floors: 1

Greeley Mall is a 578,000-square-foot (53,700 m^{2}) mall located in Greeley, Colorado. It has about 61 tenant spaces inside the mall along with five anchor spaces, but only two of the five anchors (Cinemark, Habitat for Humanity ReStore) are occupied.

== History ==
The mall was built in 1973 and today is focused on housing mostly local businesses.

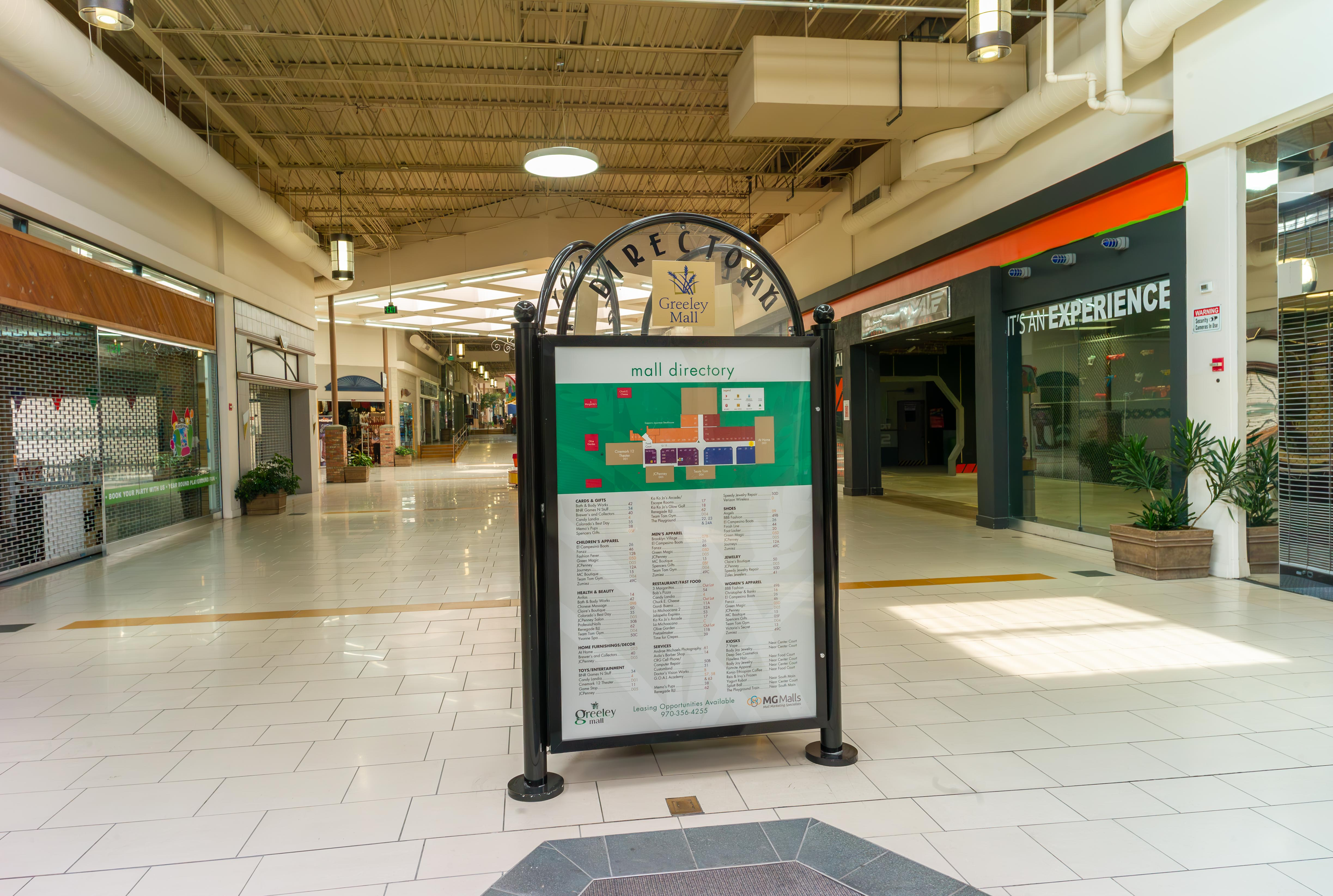
Greeley Mall 2023

=== Stores ===
==== Anchors ====
At the time of the Greeley Mall opening, there were only three anchor stores: Joslin's, Montgomery Ward, and J.M. McDonalds (a department store not to be confused with the restaurant chain, McDonald's) that briefly had a different name at the time of mall opening. Sears and an extension of the mall were built on the north side of the mall in 1981. This new wing contained a Radio Shack and a toy store named Three Wishes. JCPenney, the last anchor store, was relocated from downtown Greeley in 1987 and built on the south west portion of the mall. The original main entrance to the Greeley Mall had been on the north side where this Sears and outcropping was built. Dillard's opened at Greeley Mall in 1998 after buying out Mercantile Stores, Inc., owner of the Joslin's brand at the time; similar to other instances where Dillard's bought out other brands, Dillard's occupied two store fronts (referred to as Dillard's East and Dillard's South), closing both in 2008 by May 14. AtHome began the process of opening in the former Dillard's East in 2015, softly opening on Thursday, July 28 and having its grand opening on August 8; it was short lived with AtHome announcing a relocation in 2020 and moving to Johnstown, Colorado in February 2021. The AtHome space would be briefly occupied by Rodz & Bodz Movie Car Museum, which opened on March 16, 2024, but closed on September 2nd, 2024 due to the mall's refusal to do anything about the poor state of the space, with issues such as a broken HVAC system and leaking ceiling. Sears closed in January 2018, and it was demolished in 2019. JCPenney closed in 2020 after filing for bankruptcy.

==== Other smaller tenants ====
Some of the early notable stores in the Greeley Mall were Barbary Cheese, Balanced Diet, Carousel, Zezo's Magic Castle, Foxxmore, Stuarts, Frankies, Qualitat Unlimited, Martin's Shoes, Kenney's Shoes and Natural Music, and organ store. There was also a Regency Hallmark store that had two mall openings with a bridge that was a shortcut between two mall sections, a store selling pewter goods and a candle store called Candle Junction and a Record Bar store. In the hallway toward the east in the J.M. McDonald's store wing was a pinball arcade named Land of Odds.

The mall did not have a food court at the time it was built, but there was a cantina named Godinez that had an outside entrance that faced the north, Dairy Queen, and an Arby's that had a back door exit that was on the south side. There was a Karmelkorn store in the center of the mall that was the longest standing tenant and an Orange Julius with a Devil themed decor. Interestingly enough, Frankies toys/novelties that was on the west of the end of the mall was the largest tenant for many years. Breslers 33 flavors was an ice cream store in a kiosk in the mall that disappeared after the 1986 remodel.

Today there are two anchor stores - Cinemark which was built in 2003-04 as part of the 2004 expansion and replaced the Montgomery Ward building. and Habitat for Humanity's ReStore which has taken the space that JCPenney once stood at. Spirit Halloween switched between both the former Team Tom Gym/Dillard's Space and the AtHome/Dillard's space for several years before, just like Rodz & Bodz did the year before, they ended up forfeiting the space and not opening as planned for the 2025 Halloween season due to the AtHome space being in an almost inoperable condition.

=== Early Décor ===
The Greeley mall was originally themed in orange carpet and dark brown woodwork with dark colored light poles inside. This decor was revamped in 1986 and most all of the original decor/fixtures had been replaced. Originally the mall had a large fountain in the center made up of a series of tall pipes that would splash down on to a yellow tiled base with a mote around it with black iron gates around it.

This fountain was very loud as the water splashed down from 20 or 30 feet from the pipe openings at the top of the fountain.

At Christmas the fountain was turned off and Santa Clause displays were set up most years. The mall also had a tall brown wooden fountain consisting of a stack of large wooden blocks. This sat closest to the Joslins entrance on the east side. There was another fountain on the west side that was by the Montgomery Wards entrance that resembled a yucca plant with water spraying in patters to give the appearing of a geodesic dome. The location and taps for this fountain are still visible even though the anchor store and the Wards entrance it sat in front of are gone.

=== The Mall's Periphery ===
==== The (Strip) Mall Behind the Mall ====
Greeley Mall has a strip mall east of the former Joslin's that was also built in 1973; it sits along the edge of Hwy 34 and 17th Avenue. This complex contained a Safeway store (previously occupied by Office Depot and Habitat for Humanity/Home Improvement Outlet) with an attached Daylight Donuts and a hallway, a Stockfleth hardware store and various other stores in this small strip. To this day, the Safeway store sits vacant. As of 2019, the rest of the building contains (from west to east) Starlight Station, Iglesia De Dios, and Wholesale Hydroponics. It sits to the south of highway 34 on the edge of 17th avenue.

There was a movie theater just south of the complex that was built in 1977 that still remains today. There is also a former CNB Bank/Bank of the West/First National Bank that was built as a bank in 1973 and still stands today; it is occupied by Coin Laundry. Once, there even was a long-since-removed Fotomat that sat between Safeway and the CNB bank. There was also some form of a Coffee Shop that sat just north of the theatre.

==== New restaurants ====
There were no buildings between 23rd avenue and the main mall to the west until 1995 when Perkin's was built in the northwest corner and Pizza Hut in the southwest corner of the lot.

Two more restaurants were later built, being Olive Garden in 2002, and Chuck E. Cheese's in 2005.

Pizza Hut would close in 2007, making way a handful of short lived locally based restaurants, including Roadkill Sports Bar from 2009-2014, Double Play Sports Bar from 2014-2016, and finally Folcarelli's Pizza for a few months in 2016. The building was finally demolished in 2023 to build the new Bank of America.

Perkin's closed in 2014, and would become occupied by 3 Margaritas in 2016.

==== Competition beyond the mall ====
There was minimal/no competition across 23rd Avenue toward the west until the 80s; before various retail giants popped up, the land was made up of only cornfields and farmers properties, no retail competition at that time. Today, the space is occupied by Tractor Supply Co and Gold's Gym (former Hobby Lobby Creative Center) that was built in 1986 as Walmart (which moved just south to a new building to switch to a super center in 1994), Habitat for Humanity ReStore and ttec that made up the former Super Kmart Center built in 1994, and other various stores, restaurants, and a theatre in the area.

=== Desire for a new design ===
A study from 2008 showed plans to redesign the area for better navigation and more housing. The plan included demolishing the Sears and JCPenney and relocating them to the periphery, adding housing south of the mall, and changing the layout of the entire parking lot. In this plan, the parking lot would have a main road proceeding in a circle around the mall. Sears would still sit to the north of the mall and this periphery road, and JCPenney would sit to the south west of the mall and this periphery road. This would also fully replace the closed theatre among other abandoned buildings on the periphery of the mall.

=== Owners and Buyout ===
Greeley Mall was developed by Fulenwider Co., a Denver-based company. Moonbeam Properties bought out the mall in 2012.

== Current Anchors ==
- Cinemark (former and demolished site of Montgomery Ward)
- Habitat for Humanity ReStore, in the former J.C. Penney building. (Moved from the former Super Kmart Center Building)

== Former Anchors ==
- Sears (demolished)
- JCPenney
- Rodz & Bodz Movie Car Museum (former AtHome, former Dillard's East and Joslin's Department Store)
- Team Tom Gym (former Dillard's South, former Joslins Men's Children and Home, former STAGE, former Fashion Bar, former J.M. McDonald's)
