= Northwestern Colorado =

Region in the northwest portion of Colorado

Coordinates: 40°15′N 107°30′W

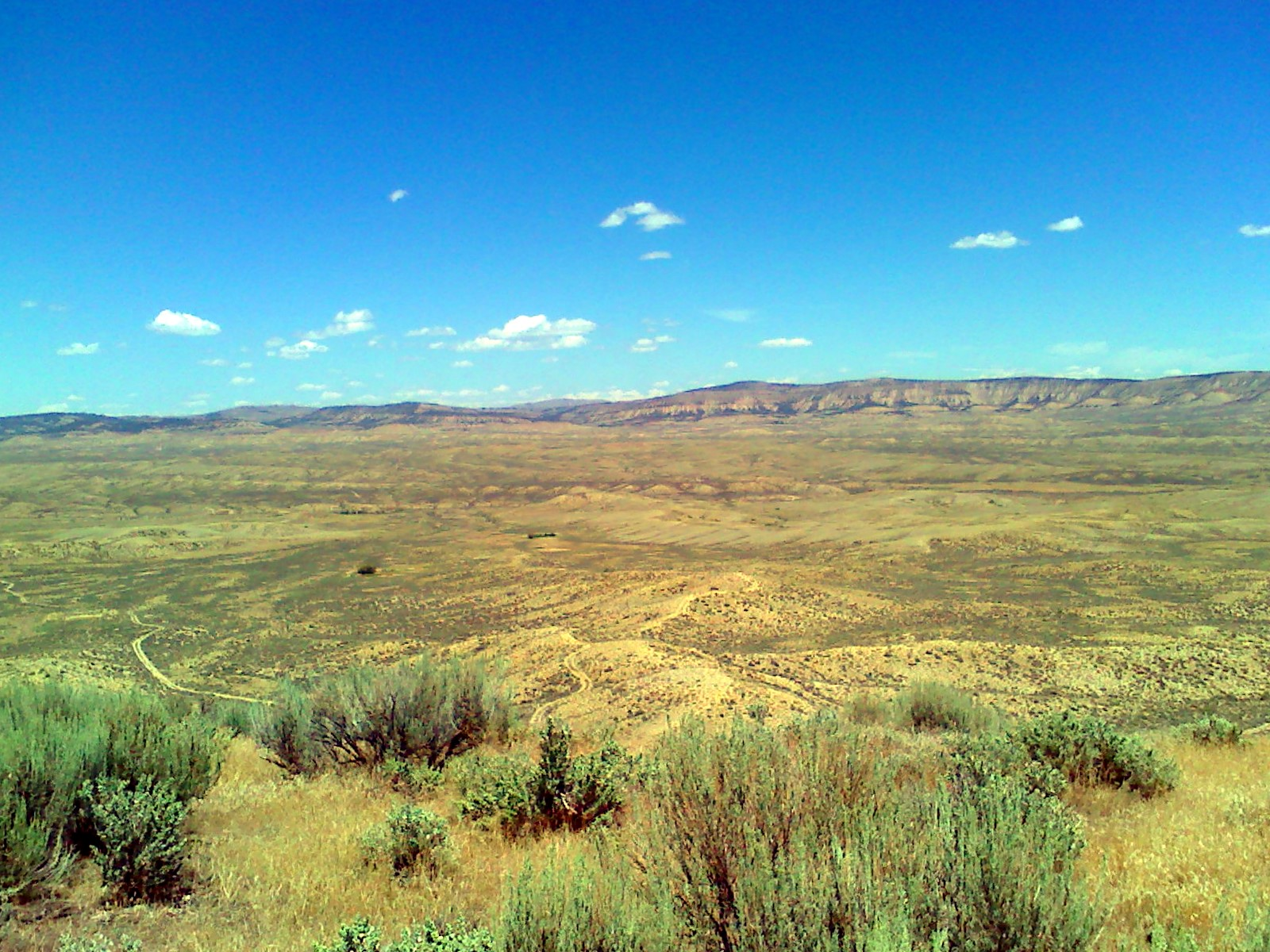
Wolf Creek Wildlife Management Area, in Moffat County, Colorado

Northwestern Colorado is a region in the northwest portion of Colorado. It borders Western Colorado, Northern Colorado, the north portion of Central Colorado, Southwestern Colorado, Utah, and the northwest state of Wyoming. This region is among the lower populated regions in Colorado.

== Counties ==
- Eagle County
- Garfield County
- Grand County
- Moffat County
- Rio Blanco County
- Routt County

== Larger cities/towns ==
- Craig, Colorado
- Eagle, Colorado
- Edwards, Colorado
- Glenwood Springs, Colorado
- Meeker, Colorado
- Steamboat Springs, Colorado
- Vail, Colorado
