= Henry Gallop =

English cricketer

Personal information
- Born: 21 August 1857; Bristol
- Died: 21 August 1940 (aged 83); Bitton, Gloucestershire
- Batting: Right-handed

Domestic team information
- Years: Team
- 1877-1883: Gloucestershire
- Source: Cricinfo, 4 April 2014

Henry Gallop (21 August 1857 – 21 August 1940) was an English cricketer. He played for Gloucestershire between 1877 and 1883.
