= Richard Gallop =

English settler in Australia (1808–1899)

Richard Gallop (9 September 1808 – 1899) was among the first European settlers to arrive in the newly established Swan River Colony of Western Australia. He landed there on 6 October 1829 aboard the ship Lotus, accompanied by his brothers James and Edward. They were recruited as agricultural labourers from the English village of Sullington in West Sussex, and were indentured to work for Colonel Peter Latour for seven years.

== Biography ==
Gallop married Margaret Drew in November 1842. They had six children: Richard (born 1843), Mary (born 1846), Anne (born 1848), Thomas (born 1851), John (born 1854) and Walter Edward Joseph (born 1857). Gallop established a market garden, an orchard and a vineyard on land he purchased on Brisbane Street in Perth, and became a member of the Perth Horticultural Society in 1875.

He was included in the list of 100 most influential West Australian business leaders (1829–2013) published in The West Australian newspaper, for his contribution to the development of agriculture in Western Australia.

Gallop is the great-great-uncle of Geoff Gallop, Premier of Western Australia from 2001 to 2006.
