= Donald Gallup =

American bibliographer and curator

- Born: Donald Clifford Gallup; May 12, 1913; Sterling, Connecticut, United States
- Died: September 6, 2000 (aged 87); Branford, Connecticut, United States
- Occupations: Bibliographer, curator
- Employer: Yale University

Donald Clifford Gallup (May 12, 1913 – September 6, 2000) was an American bibliographer, editor, and curator known for his authoritative bibliographies of T. S. Eliot and Ezra Pound.

== Early life ==
Gallup was born in Sterling, Connecticut, the son of a lumber worker. He studied at Yale University, where he was recognized by scholar Chauncey Brewster Tinker for his promise. Gallup graduated in 1934. His doctoral work focused on the eighteenth-century writer Giuseppi Baretti. After teaching English at Southern Methodist University until 1941, Gallup served in the United States Army during World War II, spending two years in England. There he collected early editions of English poetry and letters by writers such as Gertrude Stein and Alice B. Toklas.

== Career ==
Returning to Yale in 1946, Gallup became curator of the Yale Collection of American Literature, a position he held for more than 30 years. He published standard bibliographies of Eliot (1952, revised 1969) and Pound (1963), and edited works by Stein, Toklas, Thornton Wilder, and Eugene O'Neill. In 1968, Gallup confirmed the authenticity of the rediscovered manuscript of Eliot’s The Waste Land, a major literary event. He also curated exhibitions, lectured on bibliography, and published two volumes of reminiscences, Pigeons on the Granite (1988) and What Mad Pursuits (1998).

== Later life and death ==
After more than three decades Gallup retired from Yale in 1980 but continued his collecting activities, donating major holdings of Edward Lear and Eliot materials to Yale institutions. He never married and died in Branford, Connecticut on September 6, 2000 at the age of 87.

== Publications (selection) ==
- T. S. Eliot: A Bibliography (London: Faber and Faber, 1969).
- A Catalogue of the Poetry Notebooks of Ezra Pound (1980), with Diane Ross.
- Ezra Pound: A Bibliography, 1983, Gallup, Donald (1983). Ezra Pound, a bibliography. Charlottesville: University Press of Virginia. OCLC 1120928144.
- "The Ezra Pound Archive at Yale", The Yale University Library Gazette, Vol. 60, No. 3/4 (April 1986).
