= North Colorado Medical Center =

- Banner Health

Geography
- Location: 1801 16th Street, Greeley, Weld County, Colorado, United States
- Coordinates: 40°24′53.11″N 104°42′31.87″W

Organization
- Funding: Non-profit hospital
- Type: Teaching

Services
- Emergency department: Level II trauma center
- Beds: 223

History
- Former name: Weld County General Hospital (1952-1982)
- Opened: November 9, 1952

Links
- Website: www.bannerhealth.com/locations/greeley/north-colorado-medical-center
- Lists: Hospitals in Colorado

North Colorado Medical Center is a hospital located in Greeley, Colorado. The hospital is managed by Banner Health and has 223 beds. It is a teaching hospital and founded in 1952.
