= Aims Community College =

Public college in Northern Colorado, US

Coordinates: 40.411780°N 104.764316°W

- Type: Public community college
- Established: January 24, 1967
- Academic affiliations: Space-grant
- President: Dr. Leah L. Bornstein
- Students: 7540 (2015-2016)
- Location: Greeley, Colorado, United States
- Campus: Greeley, Windsor, Loveland, Fort Lupton, and Online
- Nickname: Aardvarks
- Mascot: Arty the Aardvark
- Website: www.aims.edu

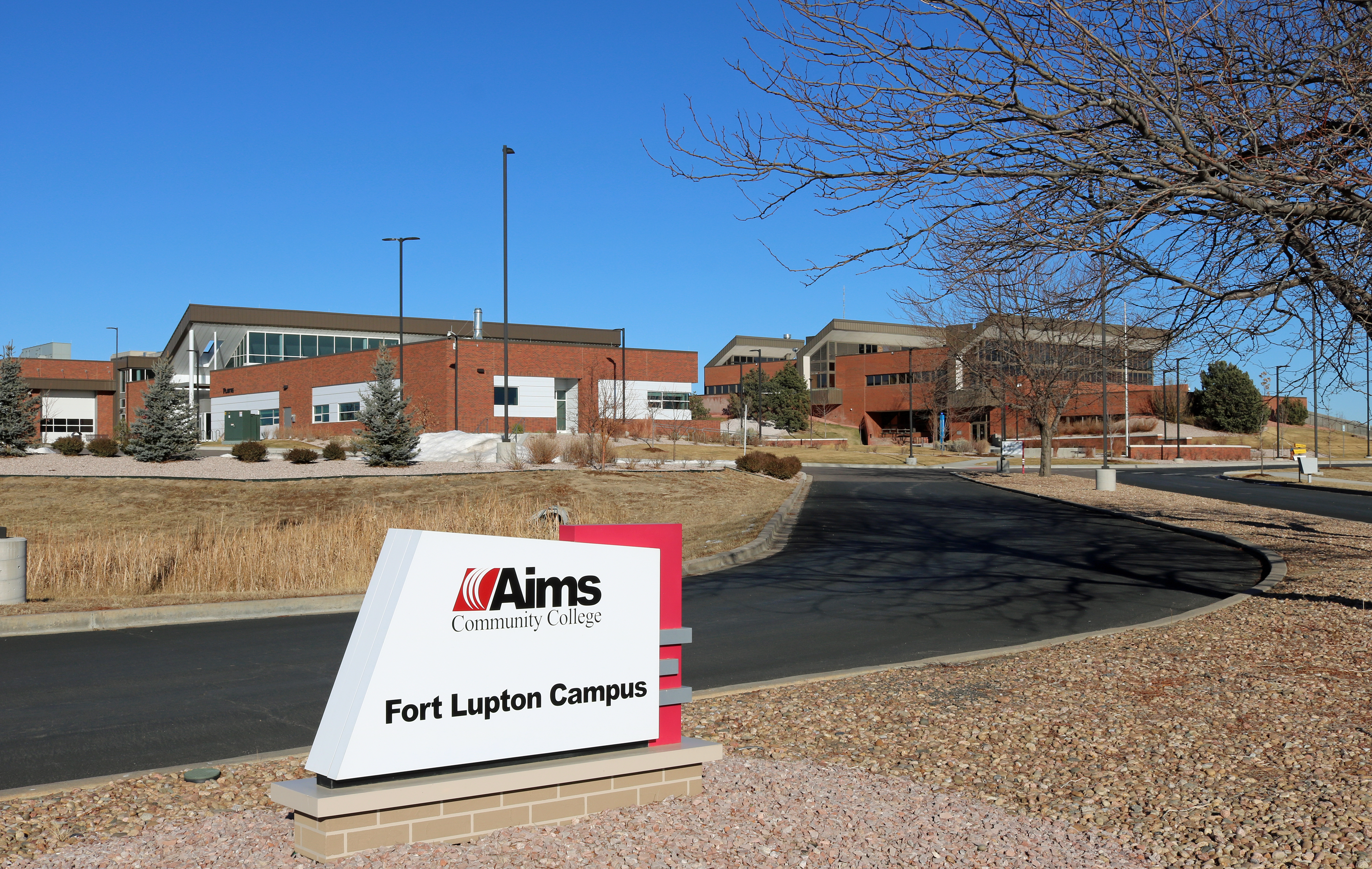
The Fort Lupton Campus.

Aims Community College is a public community college serving northern Colorado with locations in Greeley, Windsor, Fort Lupton, and Loveland. Aims has more than 200 degree and certificate programs and provides day and night classes. Aims was founded in Greeley in 1967 and graduated its first class in 1969. The school established a second campus in Fort Lupton in 1984, and a third in Loveland in 1987. The Aims Automotive and Technology Center, located in Windsor, opened in January 2010.

== History ==
=== Early history ===
In 1965, Kirby Hart of Greeley suggested that a two-year college should be considered for Northern Colorado. On January 24, 1967, the voters in 11 of Weld County’s 12 public school districts approved creation of the Community College District.

Ed Beaty was named the first president of Aims Community College. On September 27, 1967 the first day of classes began in Greeley with 949 students enrolled. In May 1968, the first class graduated and three students received degrees. In 1969, a permanent 175-acre (0.71 km^{2}) site for the college was purchased on the western edge of Greeley along what is now 20th Street and 47th Avenue.

Upon Beaty's death in 1975, Richard A. Laughlin was appointed acting president of Aims Community College. In May 1976, Laughlin was permanently named the second president. In December 1976, the physical education center was opened on the Greeley campus. Upon Laughlin's exit from the role of Aims president in February 1979, Jerry A. Kiefer was named acting president.

In August 1979, George R. Conger was appointed Aims Community College's president. In 1984, the south campus opened west of Fort Lupton. In 1987, Aims opened a campus in downtown Loveland. In April 1992, Aims celebrated its 25th anniversary. Conger retired in October 1997 after 18 years in the role of Aims president. Jerry A. Kiefer was named acting president.

August 31, 2004, was the first day of the semester system, replacing the quarter system. In August 2019, Aims opened a new flight hangar at the Northern Colorado Regional Airport, closing its flight hangar at the Greeley-Weld County Airport.

== Accreditation ==
Aims Community College is accredited by the Higher Learning Commission. Various programs at Aims also have their own accreditations.

- Associate Degree Nursing Program - Colorado State Board of Nursing (SBON) and Accreditation Commission for Education in Nursing (ACEN)
- Nurse Aide Program - Colorado State Board of Nursing (SBON)
- Med Prep Nurse Aide Program: Career Academy - Colorado State Board of Nursing (CBON)
- Automotive Service Program - NATEF (National Automotive Technicians Education Foundation) certified
- EMS-Paramedic - Commission on Accreditation of Allied Health Education Programs (CAAHEP)
- Surgical Technology - Commission on Accreditation of Allied Health Education Programs (CAAHEP)
- Police (Peace Officers) Academy - Colorado Peace Officers Standards and Training Board
- Fire Science - International Fire Service Accreditation Congress Degree Assembly
- Aviation (Fixed Wing) - Federal Aviation Administration (FAA), approved under Part 141
- Air Traffic Controller - FAA Air Traffic Collegiate Training Initiative (AT-CTI)
- Early Childhood Program - National Association for the Education of Young Children (NAEYC)

== Media ==
Aims publishes the Aims Daily and Aims Weekly e-newsletters to faculty, staff and students.

Aims Communication Media students may also work in a radio broadcast facility on the Greeley campus. The station operates on 89.5 MHz FM.

== UNC and CSU connections ==
Aims Community College students enrolled for 12 or more semester credits are eligible to enroll in one additional undergraduate class (maximum 5 semester credits) at the University of Northern Colorado (UNC) or Colorado State University (CSU) during the corresponding term without additional tuition charges.

In 2019, Aims and UNC announced their partnership called Aims2UNC, which is a concurrent enrollment program between the two schools where students start at Aims Community College and transfer to UNC.

Full-time UNC and CSU students may likewise enroll in one course (maximum 5 semester credits) at Aims. Continuing Education courses cannot be taken as the free class.
