= Greeley, Colorado =

Home rule city and seat of Weld County, Colorado, United States

- Home rule city
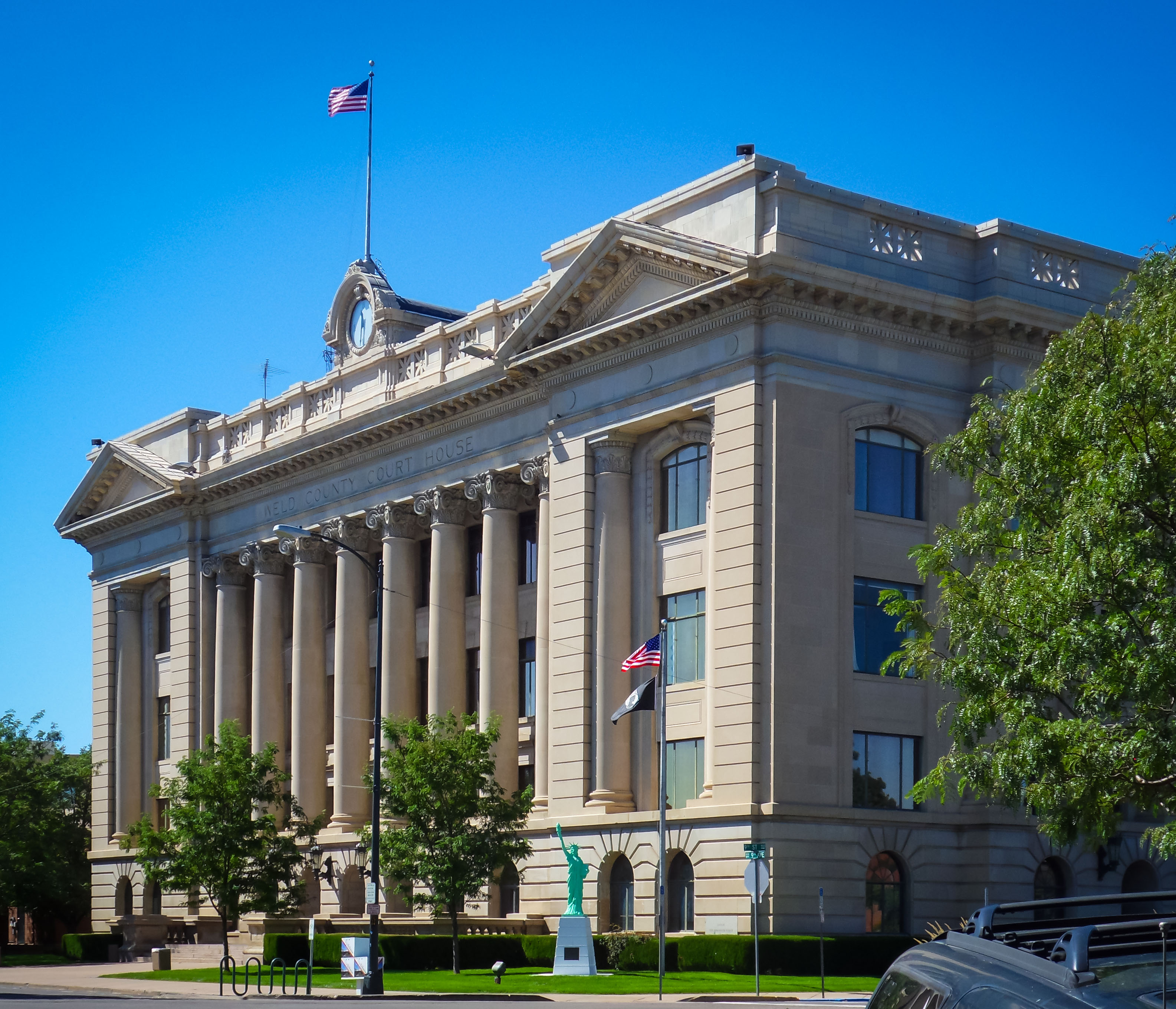
- Weld County Courthouse in Greeley
- Interactive map of Greeley, Colorado
- Location within Colorado Location within the United States
- Coordinates: 40°25′03″N 104°42′12″W
- Country: United States
- State: Colorado
- County: Weld
- Founded: 1869
- Incorporated: November 15, 1885
- Named for: Horace Greeley

Government
  - Type: Home rule city

Area
  - Total: 49.092 sq mi (127.148 km^{2})
  - Land: 48.933 sq mi (126.735 km^{2})
  - Water: 0.159 sq mi (0.413 km^{2})
- Elevation: 4,676 ft (1,425 m)

Population (2020)
  - Total: 108,795
  - Rank: 10th in Colorado; 286th in the United States
  - Density: 2,223/sq mi (858/km^{2})
- Time zone: UTC−07:00 (MST)
  - Summer (DST): UTC−06:00 (MDT)
- Area code: 970/748
- GNIS city ID: 2410654
- FIPS code: 08-32155

Greeley is the home rule city that is the county seat of, and the most populous municipality in, Weld County, Colorado, United States. The city population was 108,795 at the 2020 census, an increase of 17.12% since the 2010 census. Greeley is the tenth-most populous city in Colorado; it is the principal city of the Greeley, CO Metropolitan Statistical Area and is a major city of the Front Range Urban Corridor. Greeley is located in northern Colorado and is situated 49 miles (79 km) north-northeast of the Colorado State Capitol in Denver. The city is a college town, home to the University of Northern Colorado and Aims Community College.

== History ==
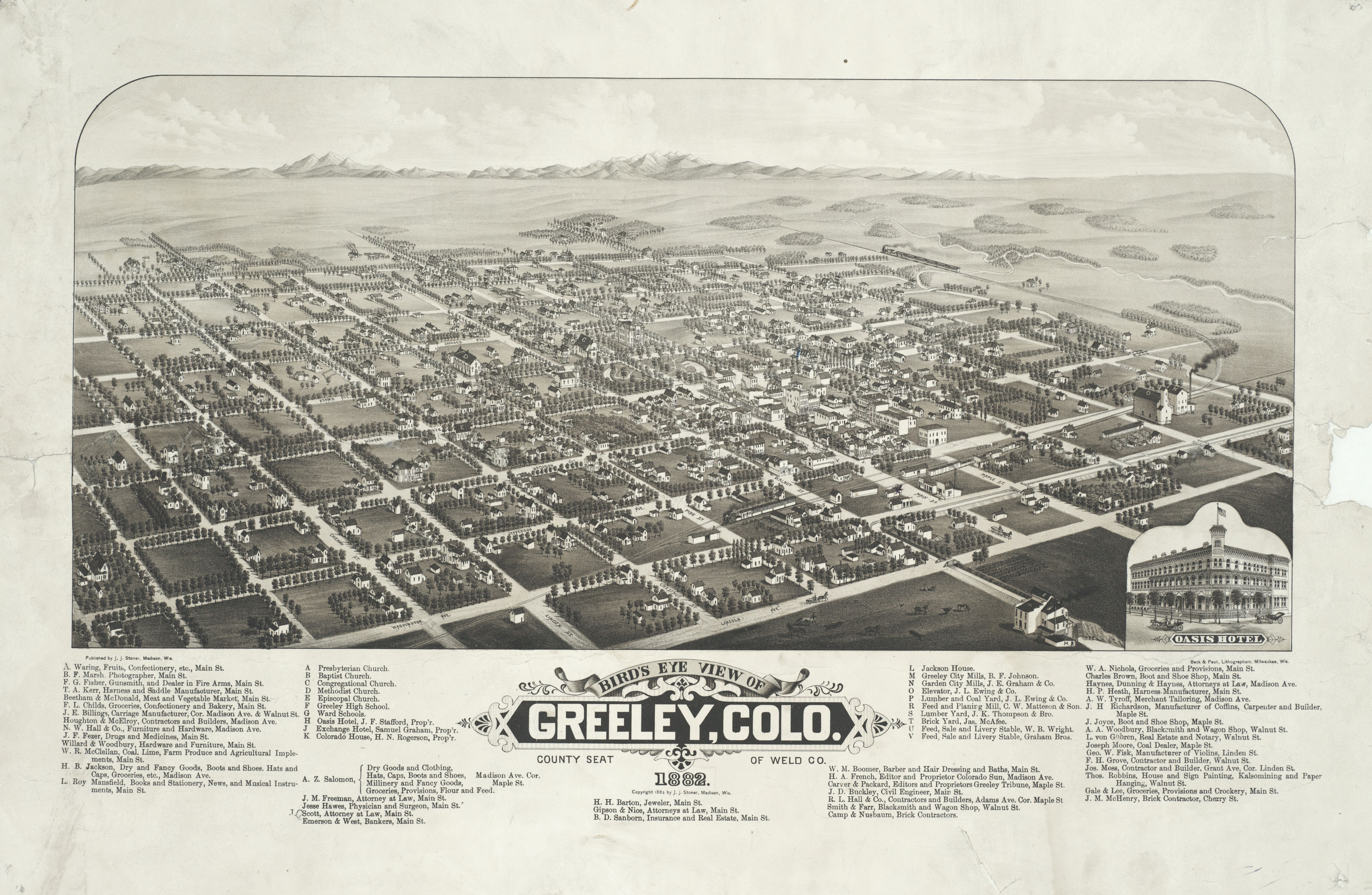
Greeley in 1882

=== Union Colony ===
Greeley began as the Union Colony of Colorado, which was founded in 1869 by Nathan C. Meeker, an agricultural reporter for the New York Tribune, as an experimental utopian farming community "based on temperance, religion, agriculture, education and family values," with the backing of the Tribune's editor Horace Greeley, who had visited Colorado in the 1859 Pike's Peak Gold Rush and had popularized the phrase "Go West, young man". A committee which included Meeker and former Civil War general Robert Alexander Cameron traveled to Colorado to find a suitable site, and purchased 12,000 acres at the confluence of the Cache la Poudre and South Platte Rivers. The site, formerly known as the "Island Grove Ranch", included the area of Latham, an Overland Trail station, and was halfway between Cheyenne, Wyoming and Denver, Colorado along the tracks of the Denver Pacific Railroad.

By May, 500 people had arrived to take up residence in the new colony. The name Union Colony was later changed to Greeley in honor of Horace Greeley.

=== Latham ===
Greeley is located just west of the area previously occupied by the Overland Trail station originally called Cherokee City. The Cherokee City, Colorado, post office operated from November 25, 1862, until November 25, 1863, when the name was changed to Latham. The Latham station, which was also known as Fort Latham, was named in honor of Milton S. Latham, one of California's early senators. The stagecoach station was at the confluence of the South Platte River and the Cache la Poudre River. It is believed that the birth of the first white child born in Colorado, a girl, occurred there. Fort Latham was the headquarters of the government troops during the Indian conflicts of 1860–1864. Latham served as the Weld County seat from 1868 to 1870, when the county seat was moved to Evans. The Latham post office was also moved to Evans on May 16, 1870.

=== Later history ===
The Greeley, Colorado, post office opened on April 21, 1870, and the Town of Greeley was incorporated on November 15, 1885.

Greeley was built on farming and agriculture, but kept up with most modern technologies as they grew. Telephones were in town by 1883 with electric lights downtown by 1886. Automobiles were on the roads alongside horse drawn buggies by 1910. A Women's Citizens League was established there to support female suffrage.

In 1922, KFKA became one of the first radio stations to broadcast in the U.S. The Greeley Municipal Airport was built in 1928.

Greeley housed two prisoner of war camps in 1943, during World War II. One was for German POWs and the other was for Italian POWs.

A vote to allow the sale of alcohol passed by a mere 477 votes in 1969, thus ending temperance in the city.

The Greeley Philharmonic Orchestra was started in 1911. In 1958, Greeley became the first city to have a Department of Culture.

On December 12, 2006, the Immigration and Customs Enforcement (I.C.E) staged a coordinated predawn raid at the Swift & Co. meat packing plant in Greeley and at five other Swift plants in western states, interviewing undocumented workers and transporting hundreds off in buses.

In June 2012, Greeley became the first city in the state of Colorado to implement SB11-273, known as the Law of Common Consumption, allowing for patrons of the Downtown Greeley Entertainment District to buy drinks in "Go-Cups" from participating downtown establishments.

On May 28, 2024, a severe hailstorm impacted the eastern side of the city, covering some areas in over one foot of hail (~30.5 cm) and causing one fatality. Mayor John Gates signed a local disaster declaration due to major flooding and hail. City officials stated that the cost of damage to the city was over $1.45 million.

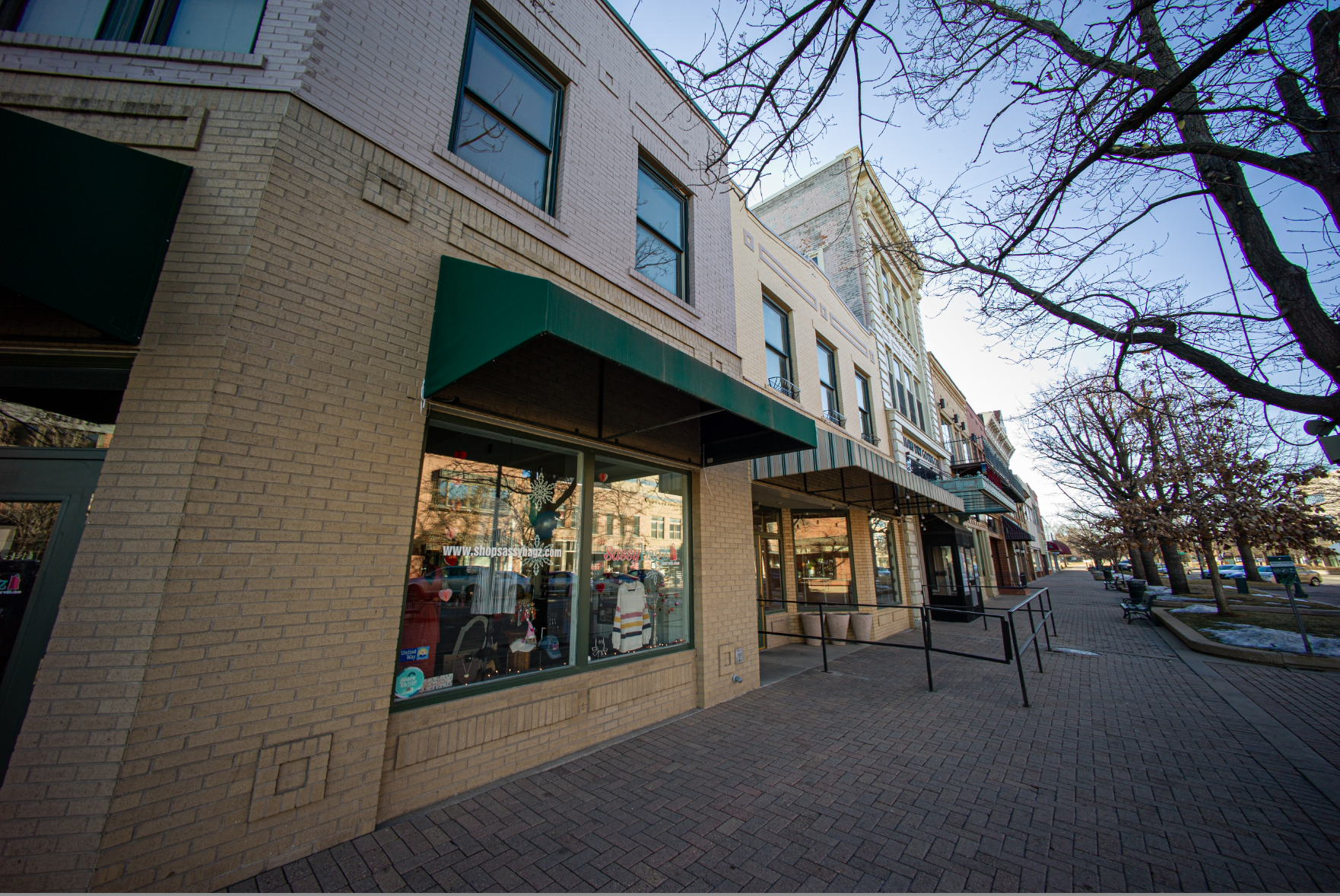
Downtown Greeley

== Geography ==
Greeley is located in the High Plains of northern Colorado about 25 mi (40 km) east of the Rocky Mountains and north of Denver.

Greeley is bordered on the south by the towns of Evans and Garden City. The Greeley/Evans area is bounded on the south by the South Platte River, and the Cache la Poudre River flows through north Greeley. The city is served by US Route 85 and US Route 34.

At the 2020 United States census, the city had a total area of 31,419 acres (127.148 km^{2}) including 102 acres (0.413 km^{2}) of water.

The nearest city with a population of over 100,000 is Fort Collins, in neighboring Larimer County.

=== Climate ===
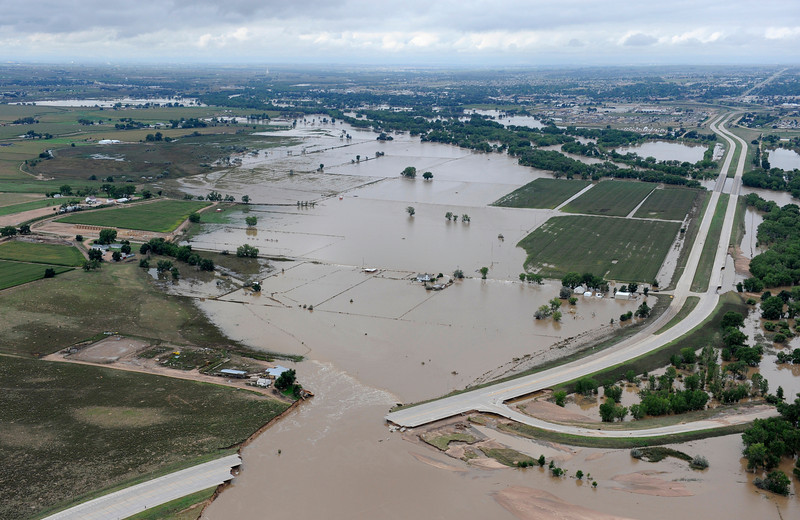
Flooding in Greeley in 2013

Greeley experiences a semi-arid climate (Köppen BSk). High temperatures are generally around 90–95 °F (32 °C) in the summer and 40-45 °F (4 °C) in the winter, although significant variation occurs. The hottest days generally occur around the third week of July and the coldest in January. Nighttime lows are near 60 °F (16 °C) in the summer and around 15–20 °F (−9 °C) in the winter. Record high temperatures of 112 °F (44.4 °C) have been recorded, as have record low temperatures of –25 °F (–32 °C). The first freeze typically occurs around October 4 and the last around May 4. Extratropical cyclones which disrupt the weather for the eastern two-thirds of the US often originate in or near Colorado, which means Greeley does not experience many fully developed storm systems. Warm fronts, sleet, and freezing rain are practically nonexistent here. In addition, the city's proximity to the Rocky Mountains and lower elevation, compared to the mountains west of the city, result in less precipitation and fewer thunderstorms. This is paradoxical, because adjacent areas (mostly farmland) experience between 7 and 9 hail days per year.

The climate in Greeley, as well as all of Colorado, is extremely dry. The Chinook winds coming off the mountains often raise temperatures to near 70 °F (21 °C) in January and February, and sometimes to near 90 °F (32 °C) in April. Greeley's elevation and low year-round humidity means that nighttime low temperatures are practically never above 68 °F (20 °C), even in the hottest part of the summer. The diurnal temperature range is usually rather wide, with a 50-degree (Fahrenheit) difference between daytime highs and nighttime lows not uncommon, especially in the spring and fall. Rapid day-to-day and diurnal fluctuation in temperature is also common.

Climate data for Greeley, Colorado, 1991–2020 normals, extremes 1967–present
Month	Jan	Feb	Mar	Apr	May	Jun	Jul	Aug	Sep	Oct	Nov	Dec	Year
Record high °F (°C)	74 (23)	78 (26)	85 (29)	91 (33)	101 (38)	110 (43)	112 (44)	106 (41)	105 (41)	91 (33)	84 (29)	76 (24)	112 (44)
Mean maximum °F (°C)	63 (17)	67.2 (19.6)	77.3 (25.2)	83.9 (28.8)	91.5 (33.1)	99.1 (37.3)	102 (39)	98.9 (37.2)	95.2 (35.1)	86 (30)	73.2 (22.9)	62.7 (17.1)	103.1 (39.5)
Mean daily maximum °F (°C)	44.1 (6.7)	47.7 (8.7)	59.1 (15.1)	66 (19)	74.7 (23.7)	85.8 (29.9)	91.7 (33.2)	89.2 (31.8)	81.9 (27.7)	67.8 (19.9)	53.6 (12.0)	43.4 (6.3)	67.1 (19.5)
Daily mean °F (°C)	30.8 (−0.7)	33.9 (1.1)	43.6 (6.4)	50.7 (10.4)	59.6 (15.3)	69.7 (20.9)	75.5 (24.2)	73.3 (22.9)	65.3 (18.5)	52.2 (11.2)	39.7 (4.3)	30.6 (−0.8)	52.1 (11.1)
Mean daily minimum °F (°C)	17.5 (−8.1)	20 (−7)	28.1 (−2.2)	35.3 (1.8)	44.5 (6.9)	53.6 (12.0)	59.3 (15.2)	57.3 (14.1)	48.7 (9.3)	36.6 (2.6)	25.8 (−3.4)	17.8 (−7.9)	37.0 (2.8)
Mean minimum °F (°C)	−2.9 (−19.4)	0.9 (−17.3)	10.2 (−12.1)	21.6 (−5.8)	31.3 (−0.4)	43.8 (6.6)	52.2 (11.2)	49.6 (9.8)	35.8 (2.1)	20 (−7)	6.4 (−14.2)	−1.2 (−18.4)	−9.2 (−22.9)
Record low °F (°C)	−25 (−32)	−20 (−29)	−10 (−23)	−3 (−19)	21 (−6)	34 (1)	42 (6)	41 (5)	17 (−8)	−2 (−19)	−7 (−22)	−24 (−31)	−25 (−32)
Average precipitation inches (mm)	0.45 (11)	0.45 (11)	0.91 (23)	1.83 (46)	2.65 (67)	1.78 (45)	1.61 (41)	1.56 (40)	1.13 (29)	1.06 (27)	0.67 (17)	0.55 (14)	14.65 (371)
Average snowfall inches (cm)	5.7 (14)	5.1 (13)	5.1 (13)	3.7 (9.4)	0.5 (1.3)	0 (0)	0 (0)	0 (0)	0.5 (1.3)	3.3 (8.4)	5.4 (14)	5.6 (14)	34.9 (88.4)
Average precipitation days (≥ 0.01 in)	3.7	4.2	5.1	7.6	10.8	8.1	7.3	7	6.2	5.6	4.3	3.6	73.5
Average snowy days (≥ 0.1 in)	3.2	3.4	2.5	2.1	0.2	0	0	0	0.3	1.1	2.8	3.4	19
Source 1: NOAA
Source 2: National Weather Service

== Demographics ==
Historical population
Census	Pop.	Note	%±
1870	480		—
1880	1,297		170.2%
1890	2,395		84.7%
1900	3,023		26.2%
1910	8,179		170.6%
1920	10,958		34.0%
1930	12,203		11.4%
1940	15,995		31.1%
1950	20,354		27.3%
1960	26,314		29.3%
1970	38,902		47.8%
1980	53,006		36.3%
1990	60,536		14.2%
2000	76,930		27.1%
2010	92,889		20.7%
2020	108,795		17.1%
2024 (est.)	114,363	▲	5.1%
U.S. Decennial Census

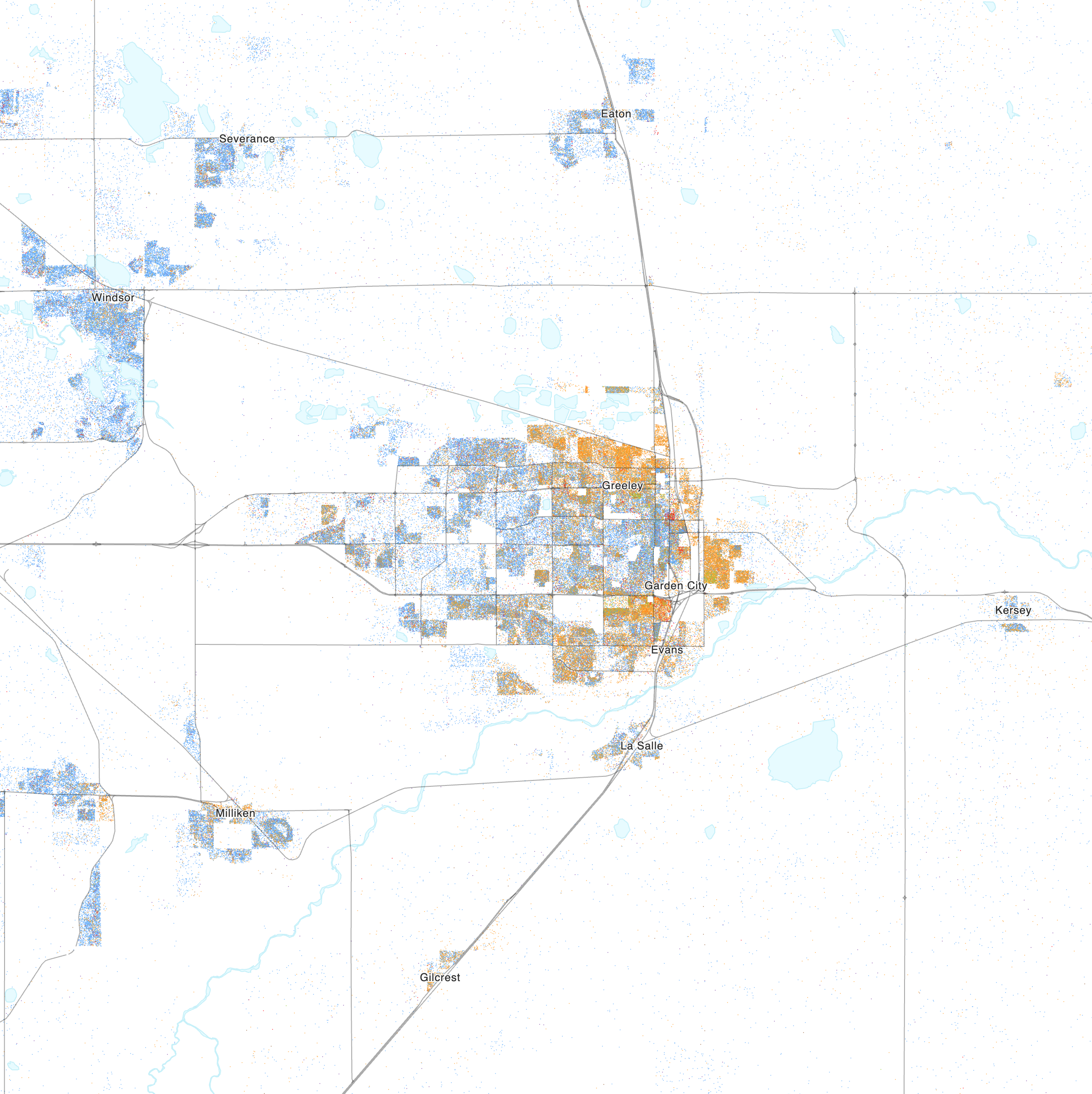
Map of racial distribution in Greeley, 2020 U.S. census. Each dot is one person: ⬤ White ⬤ Black ⬤ Asian ⬤ Hispanic ⬤ Multiracial ⬤ Native American/other

=== 2020 census ===
Greeley, Colorado – Racial and ethnic composition Note: the US Census treats Hispanic/Latino as an ethnic category. This table excludes Latinos from the racial categories and assigns them to a separate category. Hispanics/Latinos may be of any race.
Race / Ethnicity (NH = Non-Hispanic)	Pop 2000	Pop 2010	Pop 2020	% 2000	% 2010	% 2020
White alone (NH)	51,404	55,090	55,803	66.82%	59.31%	51.29%
Hispanic or Latino (any race)	22,683	33,440	43,758	29.49%	36.00%	40.22%
Mixed Race or Multi-Racial (NH)	954	1,249	3,381	1.24%	1.34%	3.11%
Black or African American alone (NH)	564	1,295	2,725	0.73%	1.39%	2.50%
Asian alone (NH)	863	1,176	2,075	1.12%	1.27%	1.91%
Native American or Alaska Native alone (NH)	268	408	528	0.35%	0.44%	0.49%
Some Other Race alone (NH)	100	141	414	0.13%	0.15%	0.38%
Pacific Islander alone (NH)	94	90	111	0.12%	0.10%	0.10%
Total	76,930	92,889	108,795	100.00%	100.00%	100.00%

As of the 2021 American Community Survey 1-year estimates, there were 109,340 people and 38,381 households in the city. The age distribution shows 80,882 residents are age 18 and older and 28,458 residents are under 18 years of age. The age distribution of the population showed 30.1% from 0 to 19, 8.8% from 20 to 24, 28.6% from 25 to 44, 21% from 45 to 64, and 11.4% ages 65+. The median age was 31.7 years old. The gender distribution was 48.2% male and 51.8% female. For every 100 females, there were 93.2 males. For every 100 females age 18 and over, there were 95.6 males.

The racial makeup of the city was 64.1% White, 2.8% Black or African American, 1.2% American Indian and Alaska Native, 1.4% Asian, 0.1% Native Hawaiian and Pacific Islander, 13% from other races, and 17.3% who identified as two or more races. Hispanic or Latino people of any race were 43.8% of the population.

Out of 38,381 total households, 26,460 (68.9%) were family households where at least one member of the household was related to the householder by birth, marriage, or adoption. 11,921 (31.1%) households were non-family households consisting of people living alone and households which did not have any members related to the householder. Of the 26,460 family households, 12,578 (47.5%) had children under the age of 18 living with them.

The population density was 2,234.5 inhabitants per square mile (862.7/km^{2}). There were 40,510 housing units at an average density of 828.4 per square mile (319.8/km^{2}).

The median income for a household in the city was $64,853, and the median income for a family was $75,477. Males had a median, full-time income of $52,730 versus $44,348 for females. The per capita income for the city was $30,195.

13.8% of families and 17.4% of the population had income below the poverty line during the 12 months prior to being surveyed. For people with incomes below the poverty line, 20.5% of those were under age 18 and 9.1% were age 65 or over.

Of Greeley residents age 25 and over, 23% were high school graduates (no college) and 26% had a bachelor's degree or higher.

== Economy ==
Among the companies based in Greeley are the meatpacker JBS USA (originally Monfort of Colorado, Inc.), the contractor Hensel Phelps Construction, and the Colorado/Kansas operations of natural gas utility Atmos Energy.

In August 2010, Leprino Foods announced plans for a new $270 million factory in Greeley. Construction began in July 2010, and consisted of three phases. The final phase was finished in 2017, and 500 people are currently employed at the facility.

=== Largest employers by numbers of employees ===
According to the city's annual list of top employers, the following are the largest employers in Greeley as of May 1, 2023:

#	Employer	# of employees
1	JBS USA	5,141
2	Banner Health / North Colorado Medical Center	4,558
3	Greeley-Evans School District 6	2,258
4	Weld County	1,823
5	University of Northern Colorado	1,221
6	City of Greeley	1,145
7	University of Colorado Health (All Weld)	1,030
8	State Farm	857
9	Aims Community College	817
10	North Range Behavioral Health	560

=== Military ===
The 233rd Space Group is a unit of the Colorado Air National Guard located at Greeley Air National Guard Station. It is adjacent to the Greeley–Weld County Airport and makes use of its runways.

== Arts and culture ==
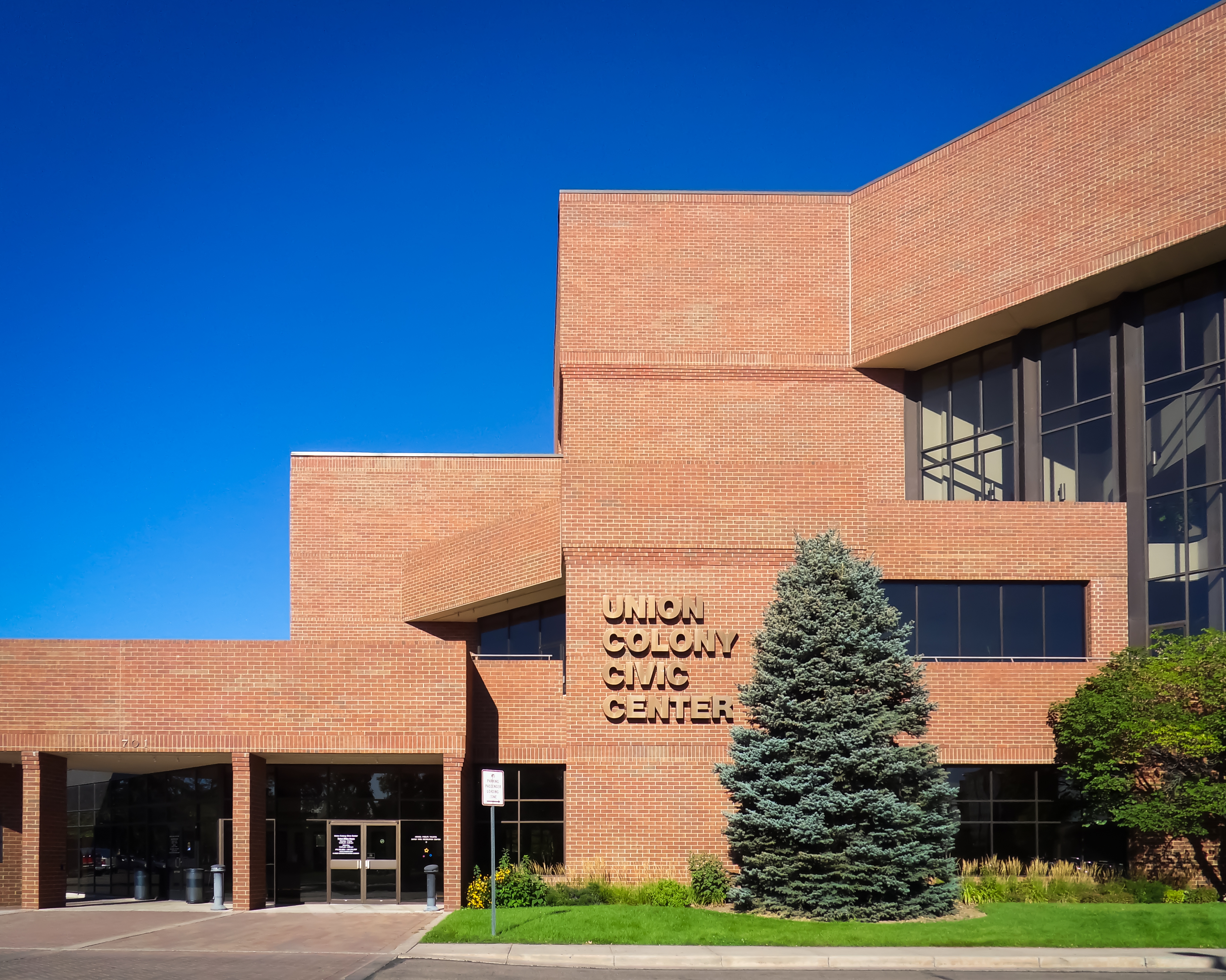
The Union Colony Civic Center, a performing arts facility in Greeley

In 2014 the Greeley Creative District was certified as an official Creative District by the Colorado Office of Economic Development and International Trade.

First known as the Greeley Spud Rodeo in 1922, the summer celebration was renamed the Greeley Independence Stampede by 1972. This locally famous event typically lasts nearly two weeks leading up to Independence Day. Including events like a demolition derby, rodeos, carnival rides and games, food vendors, live musical performances, and even a 4th of July parade, this yearly tradition has grown to draw-in visitors from neighboring cities and states. The average yearly attendance is nearly 250,000.

=== Union Colony Civic Center ===
Greeley is home to the Union Colony Civic Center, one of the largest performing arts venues in Colorado. The 1,686-seat Monfort Concert Hall hosts touring Broadway musicals, concerts, comedians, along with regional and local performing arts groups. The 214-seat Hensel Phelps Theatre hosts the Stampede Troupe in addition to lectures, meetings, and smaller performances. The Tointon Gallery presents a dozen exhibits annually by local, regional, and national artists, and is free to the public.

Owned and operated by the City of Greeley, the Union Colony Civic Center sponsors many events held by the University of Northern Colorado, Greeley Philharmonic Orchestra, the Greeley Chorale, and the Stampede Troupe theater company.

== Government ==
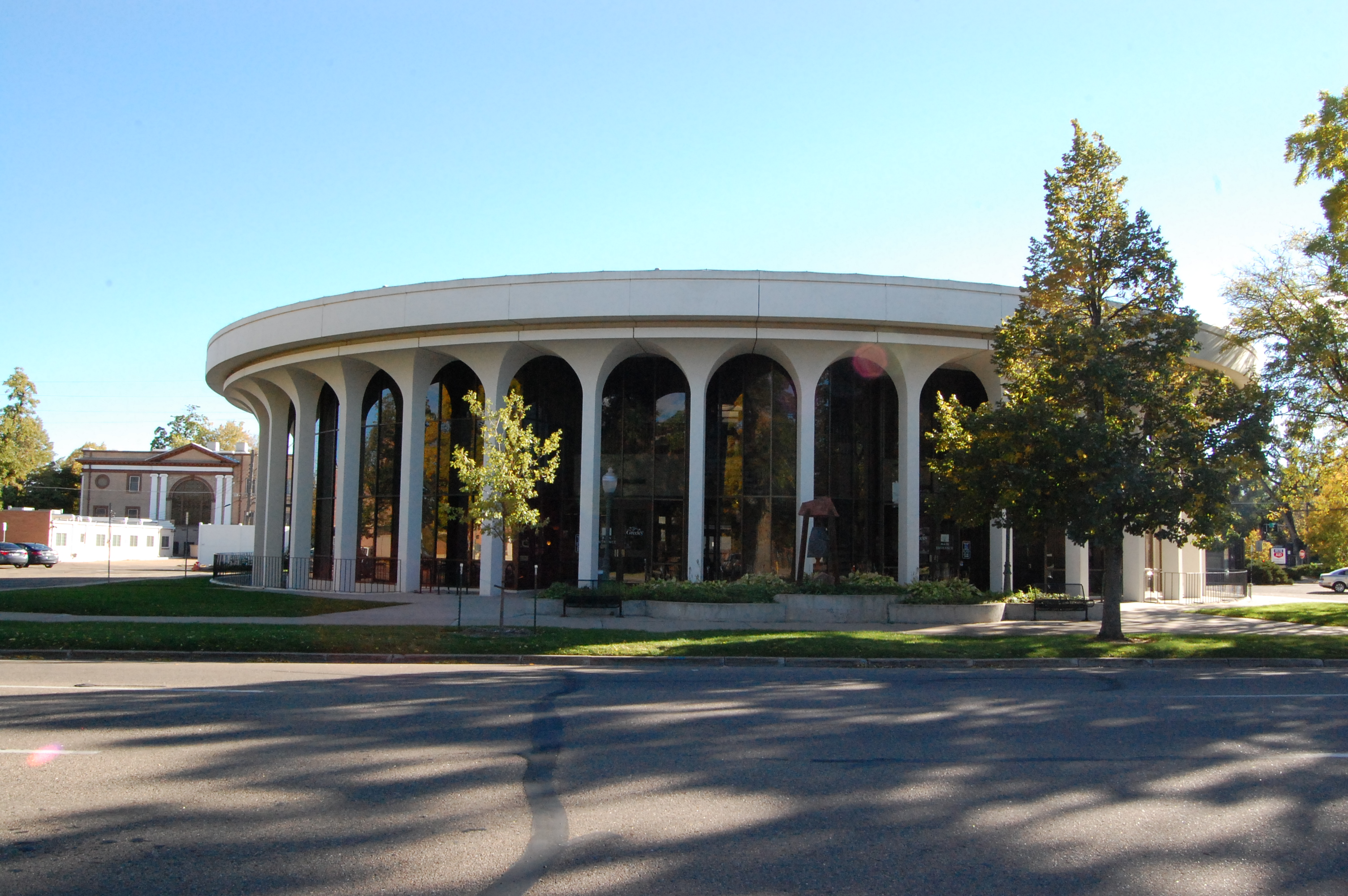
City Hall

Greeley operates under a council-manager system of government, where the city council, composed of seven members, adopts laws and policies for the city, in addition to establishing priorities. This council includes elected members from each of the four wards, two at-large members, and the mayor.

== Education ==
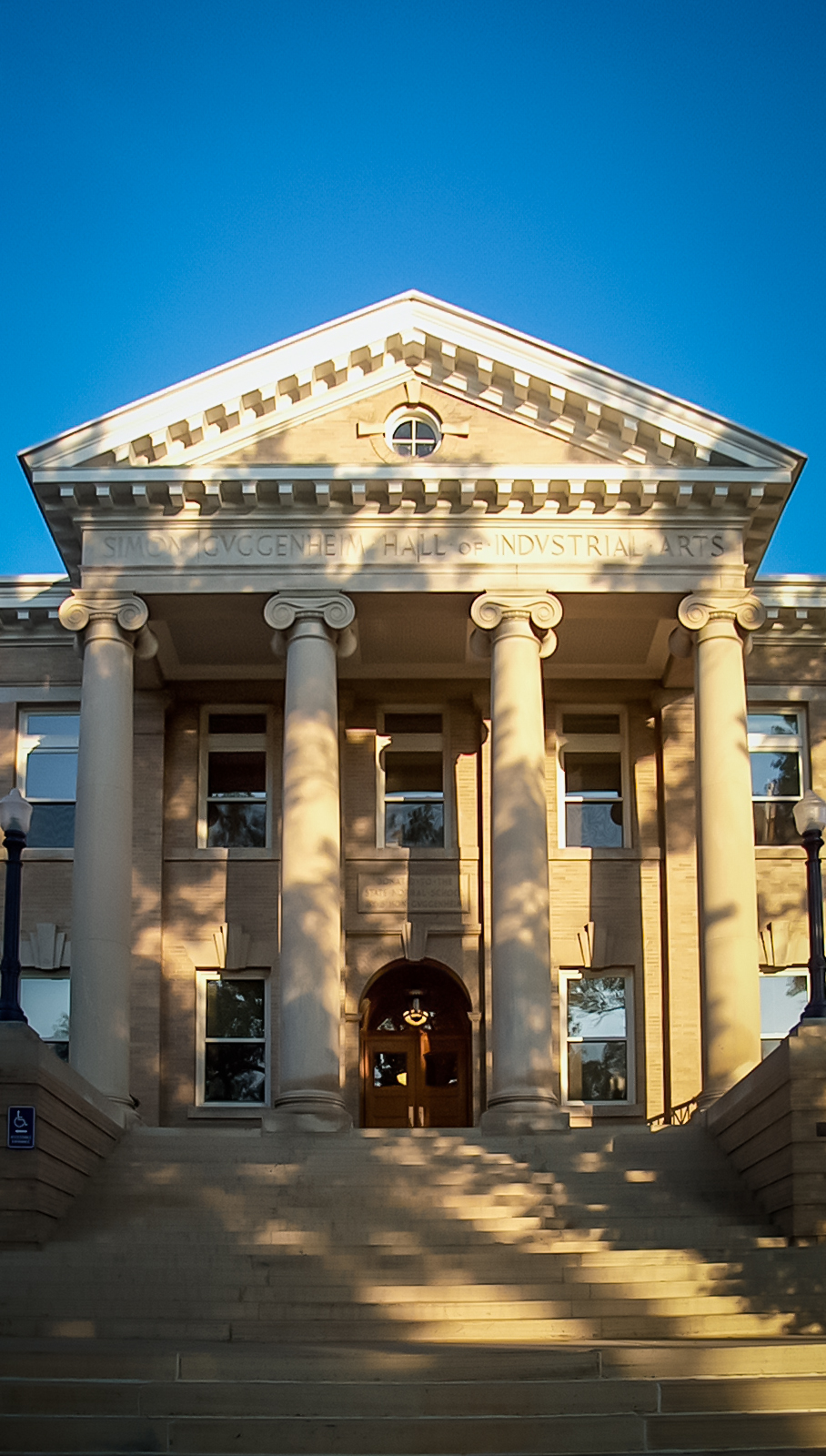
Guggenheim Hall, University of Northern Colorado.

=== Primary and secondary schools ===
In 2021, there were an estimated 20,442 children ages 5–18 living in Greeley, about 18.7% of the population. Most areas in Greeley and the neighboring Evans lie in Greeley-Evans School District 6. This public school district operates two preschool programs, 11 elementary schools, six K–8 schools, four middle schools (grades 6–8), one junior high school (grades 7–9), three traditional and three non-traditional high schools, and one K–12 online school. The school district also operates the Poudre Learning Center, a community resource focused on providing educational programming about the Cache la Poudre river. Many public schools offer one or more magnet programs, which enable students from around the district to attend public schools other than their assigned neighborhood school to participate in a unique educational program. Examples include Greeley West High School's International Baccalaureate and agriculture programs, Greeley Central High School's arts magnet program, and Northridge High School's science, technology, engineering and math (STEM) and horticulture programs.

In addition to the school district's own schools, it also charters and oversees six charter schools: University Schools (K–12), Frontier Academy (K–12), West Ridge Academy (K–8), Salida del Sol (K–8, bilingual school), Union Colony Elementary School (K–5), Union Colony Preparatory School (6–12). The district also partially is affiliated with four "community partner" preschools, which are private preschools all or partially funded and overseen by the school district. Many of the district's charter high schools and non-traditional public high schools maintain a relationship with Aims Community College and/or the University of Northern Colorado to provide supplemental courses for high school students.

There are at least five wholly private primary or secondary schools inside the Greeley city limits: St. Mary's Catholic School (P–7), Dayspring Christian School (P–12), Trinity Lutheran School (P–6), Adventure Child Care Center (P–6), and the Colorado Heritage Educational School System (K–12). There are at least three private preschools: #1 Child Enrichment-Superior Childcare, Shepherd of the Hills Lutheran Preschool, and ABC Central. In Colorado, private schools are considered businesses and are not regulated by the Colorado Department of Education or local school boards. In 2021, the Greeley-Evans school district reported 229 students who are home-schooled full-time; some number of these students may be affiliated with a private school for record-keeping purposes and some may attend public or charter schools for a few courses, making the exact number of home-schooled students in Greeley difficult to specify.

=== Colleges and universities ===
Colleges and universities in Greeley include University of Northern Colorado, a public university with an enrollment of around 9,000 students, Aims Community College, IBMC College, and the Academy of Natural Therapy.

== Infrastructure ==
=== Health care ===
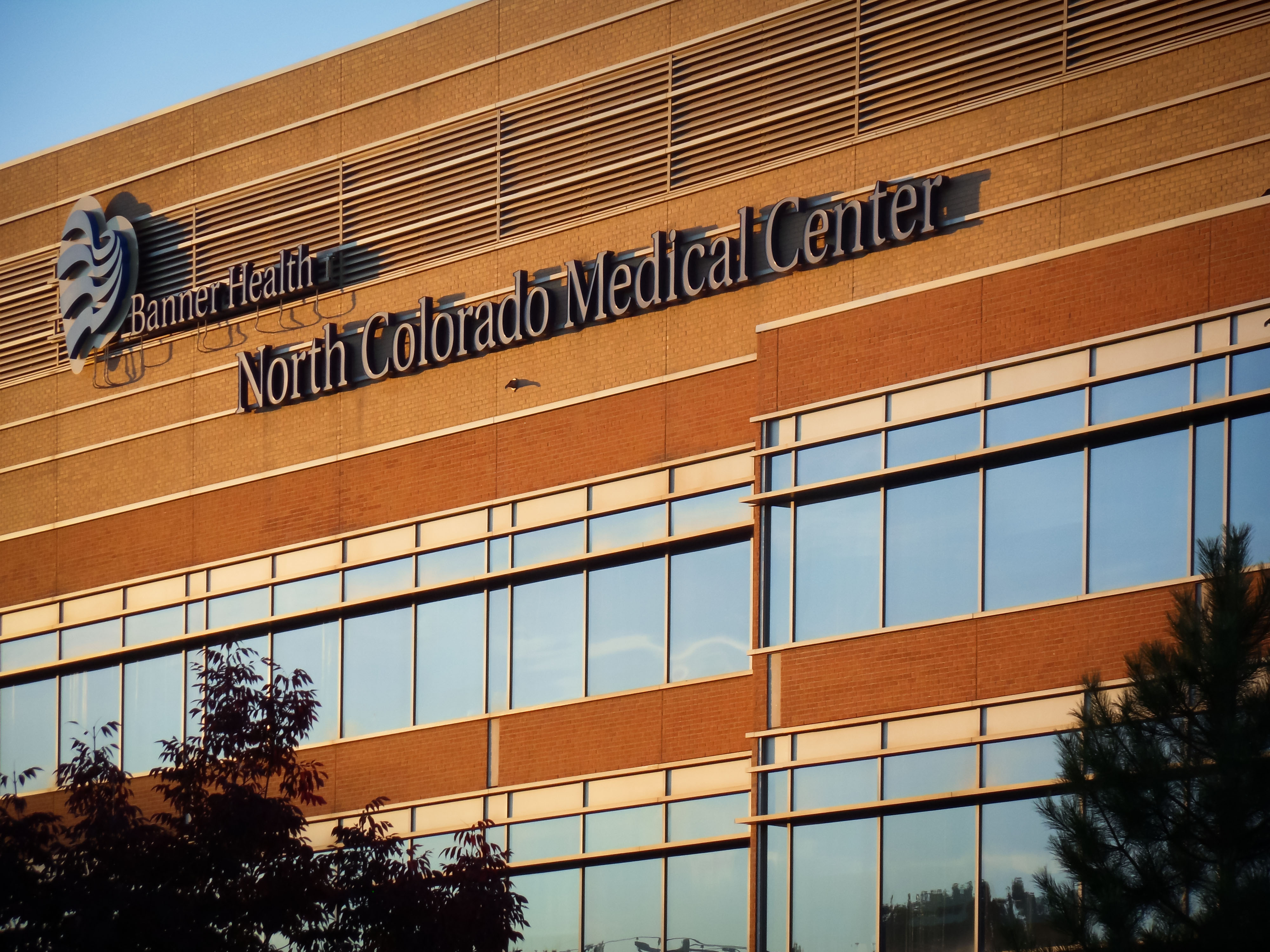
North Colorado Medical Center, a full-service hospital, is one of Greeley's largest employers.

North Colorado Medical Center opened in 1904, and is the primary medical facility for Weld County. In 2019, UCHealth opened Greeley Hospital.

=== Police ===
Founded in 1871, the Greeley Police Department is one of the ten largest police departments in Colorado, employing 64 non-sworn members, and 157 sworn members.

Since 2006, the Greeley Police Department has received more than $2.3 million of tactical military equipment from the United States Department of Defense.

=== Transportation ===
Public transportation in Greeley is provided by Gallop, which operates seven local bus routes across Greeley. The agency was known as Greeley–Evans Transit until 2026. Gallop also operates a regional bus service called the Poudre Express which connects Greeley to Fort Collins and Windsor. Express Arrow also operates buses to Denver and Buffalo, Wyoming, stopping at multiple other cities along the way. Air service is routed through Greeley–Weld County Airport.

== Notable people ==
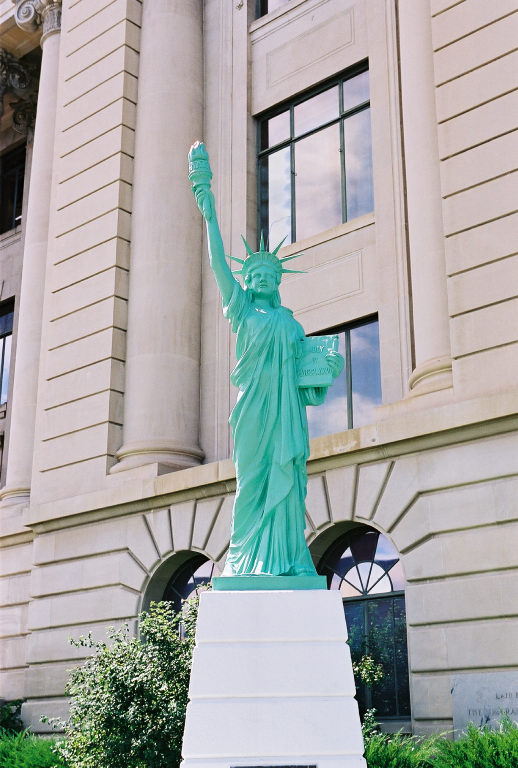
A replica Statue of Liberty in Greeley

- Dee Bradley Baker, voice actor
- Maycee Barber, professional flyweight UFC fighter
- Tad Boyle, basketball head coach, University of Colorado
- Joanna Cameron, actress and model, best known for her portrayal of the title role in The Secrets of Isis
- Delphus Carpenter, water attorney and politician, author of the Colorado River Compact
- Shane Carwin, professional heavyweight UFC fighter
- Shawn Chacón, former MLB player for Colorado Rockies, New York Yankees, Pittsburgh Pirates, & Houston Astros
- Cobalt (band), Black Metal band from 2000-2025; originally composed of Phil McSorley (of Greeley) and Erik Wunder (of Fort Collins, Colorado)
- Bill Daniels, pioneer in cable television industry
- Anthony Dexter, actor who lived in Greeley after his retirement
- Reed Doughty, safety for NFL's Washington Commanders
- Charles Lewis Fussell, 19th-century landscape artist
- Greg Germann, actor
- Miriam Gideon, composer
- Edward W. Hardy, composer, violinist and producer who attended the University of Northern Colorado (D.A.)
- Taryn Hemmings, professional soccer player for the NWSL Chicago Red Stars
- Tom Johnson, composer
- Van Johnson, racing driver
- Jerrel Larkins, tattoo artist, contestant on Ink Master
- Gavin MacFadyen (1940–2016), director of WikiLeaks and founder of Centre for Investigative Journalism (CIJ)
- Ted Mack, radio and TV host
- Gary McMahan, singer/songwriter
- James A. Michener, novelist, attended University of Northern Colorado
- Marianne Meed Ward, first woman mayor in Burlington, Ontario, Canada
- Elisha Capen Monk, one of the town's founders
- Roy Norris (1948–2020), one of the two "Toolbox Killers"
- Andrew Perchlik, member of the Vermont Senate
- Richard Perchlik, mayor of Greeley and professor at the University of Northern Colorado
- Amanda Peterson, actress
- Maggie Peterson, actress and singer
- Sayyid Qutb, leading member of the Egyptian Muslim Brotherhood in the 1950s and '60s lived in Greeley in 1949
- Marguerite Roberts (1905–1989), screenwriter
- Tom Runnells, former bench coach for Colorado Rockies and former coach and manager of Montreal Expos
- Jason Smith, professional basketball player for five teams
- Jed Stugart, College football coach, current head coach for the Lindenwood Lions
- Ron Waterman, professional heavyweight UFC fighter
- Connie Willis, science-fiction author
- Doug Kershaw, singer and songwriter

== In popular culture ==
A fictionalized Greeley was featured heavily in the season 15 finale episode of the popular animated television show South Park, titled "The Poor Kid". The episode sees main characters Kenny McCormick and Eric Cartman move to the town, after being put into foster care.

== Sister city ==
Greeley is a sister city to Moriya, a city located in Japan's Ibaraki Prefecture. The cities host a collaborative student exchange program—on odd-numbered years the City of Greeley sponsors ten high-school students to visit Moriya for a week, and on even-numbered years Greeley hosts students from the city. From 2020 until at least 2022, the student exchange aspect of the program was temporarily suspended due to the COVID-19 pandemic.

== See also ==
- Greeley, CO Metropolitan Statistical Area
- Denver-Aurora-Greeley, CO Combined Statistical Area
- Front Range Urban Corridor
