= Claude E. Robinson =

American statistician

Claude E. Robinson (1900–1961) was an American pioneer in advertising research and opinion survey research techniques. Along with George Gallup, he was instrumental in developing many scientific sampling techniques that were later used in Gallup polls and other public opinion research surveys.

== Life ==
Claude Robinson was born in Portland, Oregon in 1900, the son of a teacher. He left high school to join the Army during World War I but later returned to Oregon to work his way through the University of Oregon where he won the Phi Beta Kappa key. He received M.A. and Ph.D. degrees in sociology from Columbia University.

In 1929, while still a student at Columbia, Robinson filed for Patent #1961170, an invention for recording the tuning of individual radio sets for what he imagined would be a ratings industry. This invention would record what a radio was tuned to, when it was turned on, and the length of time turned on. Further, the object of the invention would provide for scientifically measuring broadcast listener response over a selected period of time. Robinson sold his patent to RCA. Eventually, A.C. Nielsen developed the AudiMeter, or PeopleMeter, on which the Nielsen rating system was founded. The A.C. Nielsen Company continues to measure and compile statistics on television audiences and their viewing habits.

In 1932, Robinson published 'Straw Votes, a Study of Political Prediction', a pioneering book on scientific polling that was based on his doctoral dissertation.

Robinson was the Associate Director of the American Institute of Public Opinion, later called Gallup polls.

In 1938, he organized Opinion Research Corporation (ORC—now known as ENGINE Insights) that provides survey and market research services for public and private enterprises. In 1948, with George Gallup, he founded Gallup and Robinson, Inc., an advertising research company.

In 1945, the National Association of Public Relations Council presented Robinson with an award. He was considered to have made the greatest contribution during that year, through public relations, to the national welfare.

In 1960, Robinson served as the chief pollster for Vice-President Richard M. Nixon's unsuccessful presidential campaign against Senator John F. Kennedy. A few days after the election Kennedy and Nixon met in Florida. When Kennedy asked Nixon to rate Robinson's performance as his pollster, Nixon told Kennedy that Robinson's "polls in individual states were almost miraculously accurate." (Nixon, p. 483)

Claude E. Robinson died on August 7, 1961, from hepatitis following a cancer operation.

== Study of American capitalism ==
Claude E. Robinson made important contributions to the study of American capitalism. He chaired the Princeton University panel — Center for the Study and Teaching of Principles of American Capitalism.

He also served as a trustee of the Committee for Economic Development and the Foundation for Economic Education.

His book "Understanding Profits" was published posthumously in 1961.

== Books ==
Straw Votes: A Study of Political Prediction, by Claude E. Robinson, Robert E. Chaddock, Columbia University Council for Research in the Social Sciences; Columbia University Press, 1932. 210

Understanding Profits (Library of American Capitalism) by Claude E. Robinson (Author), Publisher: Van Nostrand (1961)
