= USS Gallup =

USS Gallup has been the name of more than one United States Navy ship, and may refer to:

- USS Gallup (SP-694), ex-Annie E. Gallup, a minesweeper commissioned in 1917 and wrecked in 1918
- USS Gallup (PF-47), a patrol frigate in commission from 1944 to 1945 and from 1950 to 1951
- USS Gallup (PGM-85), a gunboat in commission from 1966 to 1977
