= Gallup & Robinson =

Independent marketing research firm

The G&R Cooperative, LLC.
- Type: Private
- Industry: Marketing Research
- Founded: 1948
- Headquarters: United States
- Area served: 18 countries
- Key people: George Gallup (Founder) Claude Robinson (Founder)
- Website: www.gandrllc.com

G&R (formerly Gallup & Robinson) is an independent marketing research firm specializing in advertising research. Founded in 1948, in Princeton, New Jersey by Dr. George Gallup and Dr. Claude Robinson, the company helps advertisers develop, evaluate and improve the effectiveness of their advertising in media.

The company has applied many of the research techniques introduced by both George Gallup and Claude Robinson, including measures of recall, profiled idea communication, voluntary reactions to advertising, persuasion and Day-After-Recall (DAR) techniques. The company has tested more than 200,000 ads and commercials.

In recent years, the company has used Facial electromyography technique to measure emotional response to advertisements. This involves recording highly sensitive computerized measurements of minute facial movements elicited by exposure to kinetic stimuli. The system has been evaluated in the AAAA-ARF Emotion in Advertising program and is used to track subconscious reactions to each moment and element of TV and Radio advertising.
