= Gallop, Johnson & Neuman =

Missouri law firm

Gallop, Johnson & Neuman, L.C.
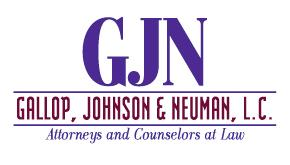
- Headquarters: Clayton, Missouri
- No. of offices: 1
- No. of attorneys: 66+
- Major practice areas: Business Services, Estate Planning, Government Law & Relations, Labor & Employment, Litigation, and Real Estate & Construction
- Date founded: 1976
- Founder: Donald Gallop, Alan Johnson, Sanford Neuman

Gallop, Johnson & Neuman, L.C. was a law firm based in St. Louis County, Missouri. Its founding was in 1976 with 10 original attorneys. In the 80's it grew to become the 12th largest corporate law firm in the United States. The firm's headquarters was in the Interco Tower in downtown Clayton, Missouri, a suburb of St. Louis County. The firm no longer practices law and entered a wind down phase on May 1, 2012. The reason given on its website was that, "Recently, like all too many companies in America, the law firm of Gallop, Johnson and Neuman has struggled with the challenges resulting from the nation’s current slow economy. Because of those challenges, Gallop has decided that effective May 1, 2012 it will no longer engage in the practice of law and will begin the process of winding down the business of the law firm." Thereafter, in 2013, a defunct Gallop settled a long-standing series of lawsuits over a trash-transfer station in St. Louis County.

== Organization ==
The firm was organized into six different departments, namely Business Services, Estate Planning, Government Law & Relations, Labor & Employment, Litigation, and Real Estate & Construction, within which individual practice groups operated.

The managing partner of the firm was Thomas J. Campbell, and the general counsel was John W. Traeger.

== Green committee and initiatives ==
Gallop, Johnson & Neuman was the first St. Louis area law firm to become a certified partner in the American Bar Association-Environmental Protection Agency Law Office Climate Challenge, a program that encourages law offices to become better environmental and energy stewards. It was the mission of the firm's Green Committee to implement sustainable, firm-wide measures to promote conservation of energy, water and natural resources by reducing, reusing and recycling and by purchasing environmentally sound products.

Gallop, Johnson & Neuman was also a member of the United States Green Building Council, a non-profit organization committed to expanding sustainable building practices. Additionally, the firm purchased Renewable Energy Credits to further the Green initiatives.

== Notable attorneys ==
Donald Gallop, one of the founding partners of the firm and a former trustee and board member of numerous community organizations and foundations, was the Commissioner and former co-chair of the Missouri Lewis and Clark Bicentennial Commission until he died on May 22, 2002. The main staircase at the Washington University School of Law, which curves from the first floor to the fourth floor main entrance to the Law Library, is named in his honor; Gallop was the chair of the school's National Counsel from 1993 to 2002.

Sanford Neuman, another founding partner of the firm, was named Distinguished Alumnus by the Washington University School of Law in 2003, and has been recognized in The Best Lawyers In America every year since 1995. Neuman has also been on the Board of Directors of LMI Aerospace since 1984. Neuman is the President of Jewish Federation of St. Louis.

John Temporiti, the immediate past Missouri Democratic Party Chair, is of counsel at GJN, and previously was Chief of Governmental Affairs for St. Louis County Executive Charlie Dooley. He was appointed by Missouri Governor Jay Nixon to the Missouri Development Finance Board, as well as the Missouri Housing Development Commission. Temporiti served as a superdelegate at the 2008 Democratic Convention.

Alan Johnson, the third founding partner, after leaving the firm was chairman and CEO of Johnson Research & Capital Inc., as well as senior vice president, strategic planning and corporate growth, for St. Louis-based KV Pharmaceutical Co., until his death in 2006.

Stuart Symington Jr., son of former United States Senator Stuart Symington from Missouri, is of counsel at GJN. He has been awarded the Department of the Army Outstanding Civilian Service Award from the Secretary of the Army and the Ordre national du Mérite from the President of France. Symington was appointed by former Missouri Governor Matt Blunt on the Missouri Civil War Sesquicentennial Commission.

Thomas J. Campbell, the firm's managing partner, is the Chairman of Public Policy for and on the board of directors of the St. Louis Regional Chamber & Growth Association. He was appointed by Charlie Dooley for a four-year term on the board of directors of the Metropolitan Zoological Park and Museum District, one of the largest districts of its kind in the nation.
