= George Gallup =

American statistician (1901–1984)

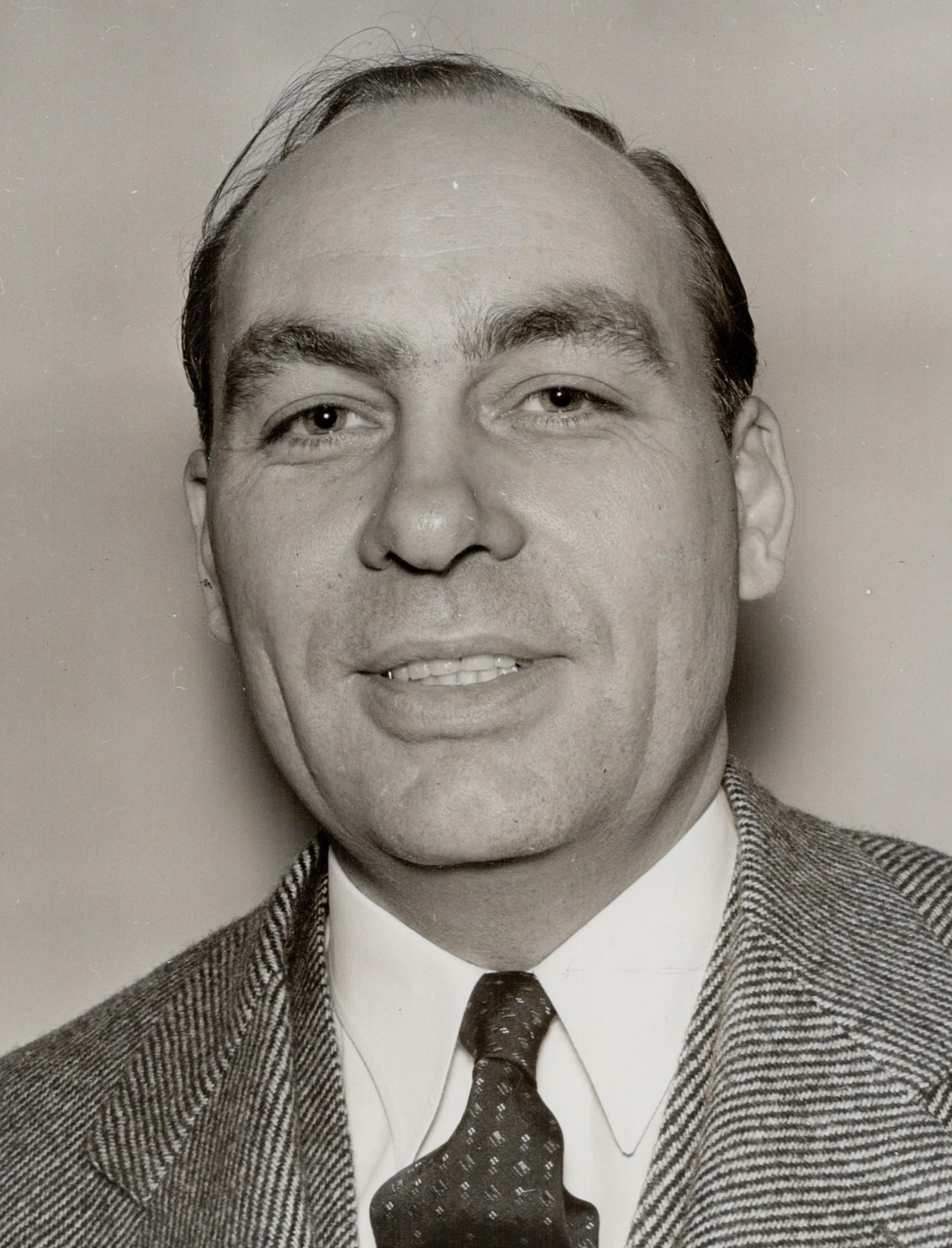
- Gallup in 1961
- Born: George Horace Gallup; November 18, 1901; Jefferson, Iowa, U.S.
- Died: July 26, 1984 (aged 82); Tschingel ob Gunten, Bernese Oberland, Switzerland
- Education: University of Iowa
- Occupation: Statistician
- Known for: Gallup poll

George Horace Gallup (November 18, 1901 – July 26, 1984) was an American pioneer of survey sampling techniques and inventor of the Gallup poll, a statistically based survey sampled measure of public opinion.

== Life and career ==
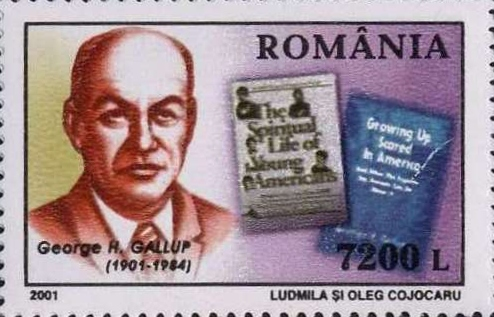
George Gallup on a 2001 Romanian stamp

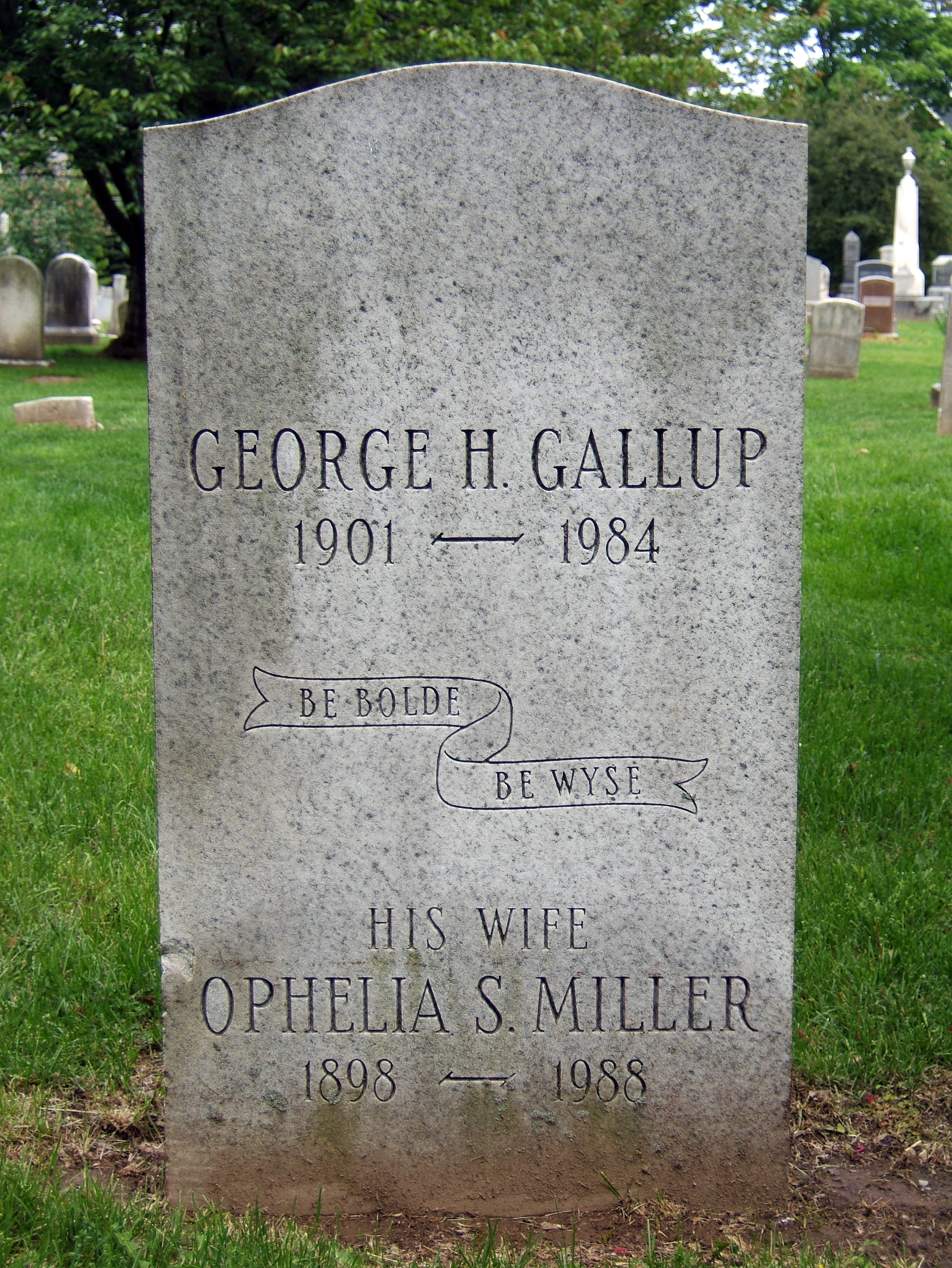
Grave in Princeton Cemetery

George Gallup, Jr., was born in Jefferson, Iowa, the son of Nettie Quella (Davenport) and George Henry Gallup, a dairy farmer. As a teen, "Ted" would deliver milk and used his earnings to start a newspaper at his high school. He attended the University of Iowa, earning his B.A. in 1923, his M.A. in 1925 and his Ph.D. in 1928. While there he was a member of the Iowa Beta chapter of the Sigma Alpha Epsilon fraternity, and editor of The Daily Iowan, the campus newspaper.

He then moved first to Des Moines, Iowa, where he served until 1931 as head of the Department of Journalism at Drake University, then to Evanston, Illinois, as a professor of journalism and advertising at Northwestern University. He moved to New York City in 1932 to join the advertising agency of Young and Rubicam as director of research, serving as vice president there from 1937 to 1947. He was also a professor of journalism at Columbia University, but relinquished the position shortly after he formed his own polling company, the American Institute of Public Opinion, in 1935.

Gallup had first become involved in polling in 1932, when he did some for his mother-in-law, Ola Babcock Miller, a longshot candidate for Iowa Secretary of State. She was swept in with the Democratic landslide of that year, furthering Gallup's interest in politics.

In 1936, his new organization achieved national recognition by correctly predicting that Franklin Roosevelt would defeat Alf Landon in the U.S. Presidential election, besting a poll based on over two million returned questionnaires conducted by the widely-respected Literary Digest magazine. Gallup's poll was based on a more representative sample of the American electorate reflected in just 50,000 more selectively chosen respondents.

Twelve years later, his organization suffered its moment of greatest ignominy by predicting that Thomas Dewey would defeat Harry S. Truman in the 1948 election by between 5% and 15%. Truman won the election by 4.5%, with Gallup attributing the error in his results to ending polling three weeks before Election Day, which failed to account for an unexpected Truman's comeback.

In 1947, he launched the Gallup International Association, an international association of polling organizations. With friends-cum-rivals Elmo Roper and Archibald Crossley, he was instrumental in the establishment of the Market Research Council, the National Council on Public Polls, and the American Association for Public Opinion Research. In 1948, with Claude E. Robinson, he founded Gallup & Robinson, an advertising research company.

In 1958, Gallup grouped all of his polling operations under what became The Gallup Organization.

Gallup died in 1984 of a heart attack at his summer home in Tschingel ob Gunten, a village in the Bernese Oberland of Switzerland. He was buried in Princeton Cemetery. His wife, the former Ophelia S. Miller, died in 1988, and their son, writer and pollster George Gallup Jr., died in 2011.

== See also ==
- Approval rating
- The Gallup Organization
- Gallup & Robinson
- George H. Gallup House
- Gallup International Association

Pollsters

- Archibald Crossley
- Elmo Roper
- Mervin Field
- Louis Harris

== Bibliography ==
- Cantril, Hadley. Gauging Public Opinion (1944)
- Cantril, Hadley and Mildred Strunk, eds. Public Opinion, 1935–1946 (1951), massive compilation of many public opinion polls from US, UK, Canada, Australia, and elsewhere. online
- Converse, Jean M. Survey Research in the United States: Roots and Emergence 1890–1960 (1987), the standard history
- Doktorov, Boris Z. "George Gallup: Biography and Destiny". Moscow: (2011)
- Foley, Ryan J., Gallup Papers Give Glimpse into US Polling History, Associated Press (2012)
- Gallup, George. Public Opinion in a Democracy (1939)
- Gallup, George, and Evan Hiill. The Secrets of Long Life (Geis Associates/Random House, 1960).
- Gallup, Alec M. ed. The Gallup Poll Cumulative Index: Public Opinion, 1935–1997 (1999) lists 10,000+ questions, but no results
- Gallup, George Horace, ed. The Gallup Poll; Public Opinion, 1935–1971 3 vol (1972) summarizes results of each poll.
- Hawbaker, Becky Wilson. "Taking 'the Pulse of Democracy': George Gallup, Iowa, and the Origin of the Gallup Poll". The Palimpsest 74(3) 98–118. Description of Gallup's Iowa years and their impact on his development.
- Lavrakas, Paul J. et al. eds. Presidential Polls and the News Media (1995)
- Moore, David W. The Superpollsters: How They Measure and Manipulate Public Opinion in America (1995)
- Ohmer, Susan (2006). George Gallup in Hollywood. Columbia University Press. ISBN 978-0-231-12133-0.
- Rogers, Lindsay. The Pollsters: Public Opinion, Politics, and Democratic Leadership (1949)
- Traugott, Michael W. The Voter's Guide to Election Polls 3rd ed. (2004)
- Young, Michael L. Dictionary of Polling: The Language of Contemporary Opinion Research (1992)

Non-profit organization positions
Preceded by Henry Bruère	President of the National Municipal League; December 1953 – November 1956	Succeeded by Cecil Morgan
