= John Gallup =

Early settler and militia captain in Southeastern Connecticut

John Gallup (also Gallop; 1619 in Dorset, England – 1675 in South Kingstown, Rhode Island) was an early settler and militia captain in Southeastern Connecticut.

== Early history ==
Gallup was born at Bridport, Dorset, England to John and Christobel Bruchette Gallop. He was baptized at St. Mary's, in Mosterton, Dorset on January 25, 1620.

On September 4, 1633, the younger Gallup arrived in Boston in the Massachusetts Bay Colony aboard the Griffin with his mother, brothers, and sister Joan. His father had reached the colony three years earlier and had established himself as a ship pilot.

In 1643, the younger Gallup married Hannah Lake, daughter of John and Margaret (Read) Lake. Hannah's aunt, Elizabeth Read, was the wife of John Winthrop, Jr., then governor of Connecticut.

== Pequot war ==
As a young man, Gallup fought with his father and brothers against the Pequot tribe in the long-running Pequot war in the Connecticut Colony. In one engagement off the coast of Block Island, the Gallups used their ship to ram another vessel that had been commandeered by Pequot warriors. In recognition of his bravery in this war, Gallup was appointed a captain of the militia.

== Land grant ==
At the end of the Pequot war, the General Court of Connecticut granted Gallup 100 acres of land close to the future town of Stonington, Connecticut. In 1654, Gallup moved his family to this land and built a homestead there. John was one of the early settlers of Stonington. His homestead place was bounded on the west by the Mystic River, south by Captain Stanton's homestead and Captain Denison's land, east by Denison's land and the town lots, and on the north by Robert Park's land. Gallup represented the town at the General Court in 1665 and 1667. Gallup also served as a language interpreter to the Native Americans. A portion of the land (in the area now known as Voluntown, CT) is still held by a Gallup descendant.

== King Philip's War ==
With the outbreak of King Philip's War in 1675, Gallup again went to war. When New London County raised seventy men under Captain John Mason of Norwich, Connecticut, Gallup joined with him to lead their Mohegan allies. These troops moved eastward and soon joined with those of the other colonies. Gallup and his unit of Mohegan warriors were dispatched to join the other colonial units attacking the swamp fort of the enemy Narragansett tribe on December 19, 1675 in present-day South Kingstown, Rhode Island.

== Death ==
While leading a charge on the Narragansett fort, Gallup was killed by a musket ball shot to the head. A complete victory was had by the colonists, but with great loss of life on both sides.

Gallup is buried at Smith's Castle in North Kingstown, Rhode Island, not far from where he died. The County Court divided Gallup's estate between his widow, 100 pounds; his oldest son John, 137 pounds; and his five daughters, 70 pounds each. Mrs. Hannah Gallup had also received large grant of land from the General Court in consideration of her loss."

In World War II, the Liberty ship SS John Gallup (Hull #951) was launched on March 3, 1943 and scrapped in 1963. This is a different ship than the USS Gallup. named after Gallup, NM (which was named after David L. Gallup, another descendant of the Gallup family.
