= List of rail accidents (1960–1969) =

This is a list of rail accidents from 1960 to 1969.

== 1960 ==
- January 7 – Italy – At Monza, an express from Sondrio to Milan failed to slow as it approaches a construction zone with a 10 km/h (6 mph) speed limit on the temporary track and derails on the sharp curve. One source says 30 people were killed and 70 injured; another says 17 killed and 120 injured.
- January 10 – United States – The New York Central Railroad's Southwest Limited from St. Louis to Cleveland, instead of slowing to pick up a train order at Wellington, Ohio, approached too fast in the fog and derailed. The signal tower was demolished, but the signalman was safely on the ground preparing to hand over the train order. Six people were killed and at least 40 injured.
- January 11 – United States – Nine people were injured after a Santa Fe Chief slammed into a stalled truck near Sanford, Texas.
- January 21 – United Kingdom – Settle rail crash: On an express passenger train from Glasgow to London, the driver heard a knocking sound on his BR Standard Class 7 steam locomotive and stopped, but could not identify the problem in a snowstorm at night. He decided to proceed cautiously to the next motive power depot, but before getting there, the engine's motion came apart and struck the tracks. The track damage derailed a freight train passing in the opposite direction; the derailed cars collided with the passenger train, killing five people and injuring nine.
- January 28 – United Kingdom – An electric multiple unit overran signals at Borough Market Junction, London and collided sidelong with a diesel-electric multiple unit. Another electric multiple unit collided with the derailed train. Seven people were injured.
- February 13 – Canada – On the CNR, the Super Continental, running 3 hours late, collided head-on with a 39-car freight train near Osawin, 32 miles (51 km) west of Hornepayne, Ontario. The passenger train's engineer was killed and 33 passengers and 4 railwaymen were injured.
- March 1 – United States – Bakersfield, California – The Chicago-bound San Francisco Chief collided with a fuel truck on Allen Road, just north of Rosedale Highway, killing 14: ten passengers, three crew members, and the driver of the truck.
- April 1 – United Kingdom – An electric multiple unit collided with a light engine between Loughborough Junction and Herne Hill due to a signalman's error. One person was killed and twelve were injured.
- May 15 – East Germany – Leipzig: Two local trains collided in Leipzig central station owing to a default in the electricity supply to the station which also affected the signalling and a following dispatcher error. Fifty-four people died, 200 were injured.
- July 8 – India – As a train crossed the Yamuna River bridge at Mathura in the North Eastern Railway zone with people riding on the roof, 25 of them were knocked off by the bridge superstructure and killed.
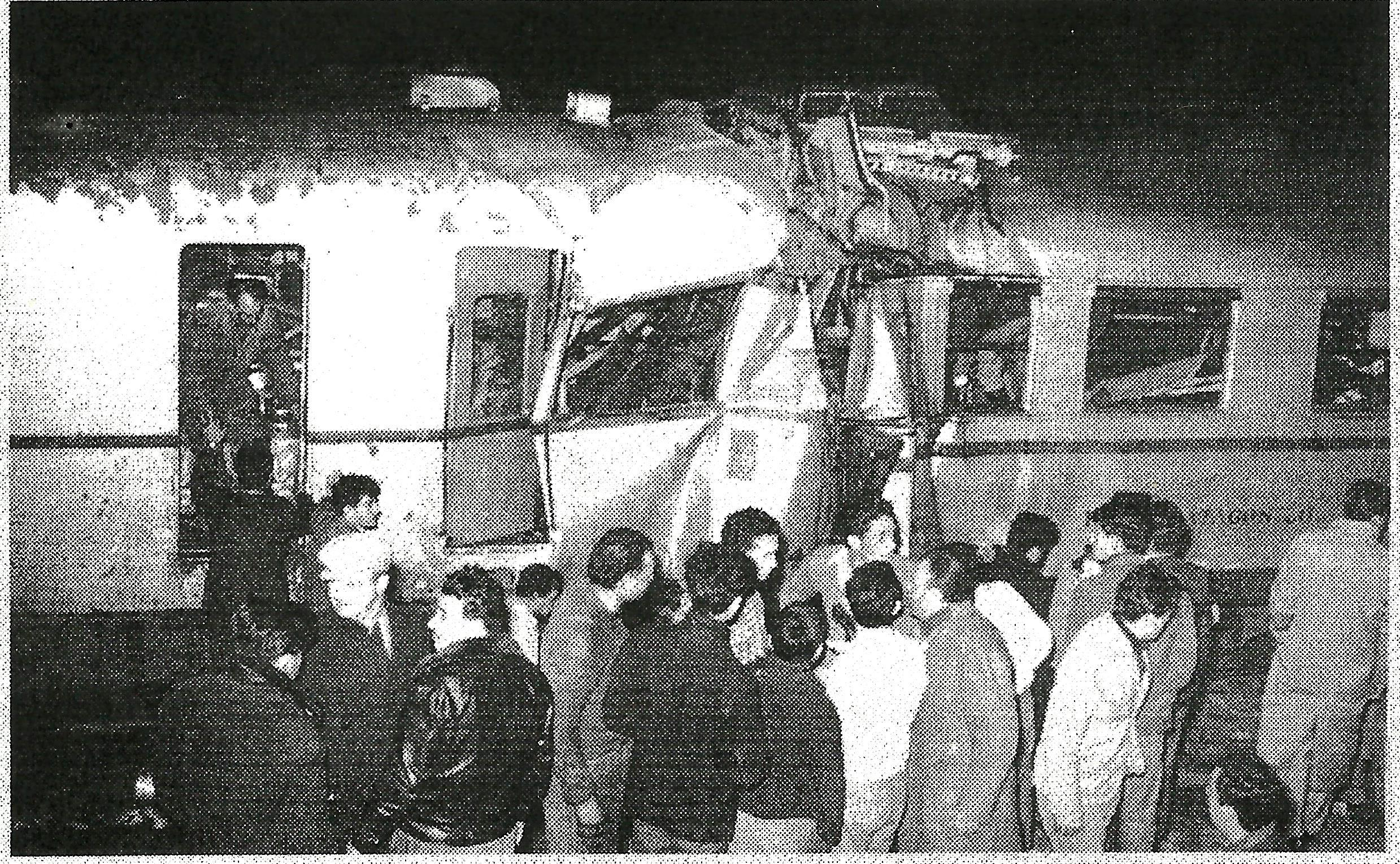
- Comodoro Rivadavia rail disaster (1960)
  July 12 – Argentina – Comodoro Rivadavia rail disaster – In Comodoro Rivadavia a passenger train suffered a brake failure, it lost control and crashed into another train at high speed. Three people died and many other were severely injured.
- July 28 – Cuba – Near Camagüey, a civilian train carrying militia from Oriente Province to Havana, reportedly suffering a brake failure, collided with the train ahead, a military passenger train also from Oriente to Havana. Several people were killed and 80 were injured.
- October 25 – United Kingdom – Severn Railway Bridge: 5 people killed and the railway bridge across the Severn destroyed when two barges hit it in fog.
- November 14 – Czechoslovakia – Stéblová train disaster: 118 people were killed and 110 injured in a head-on collision.
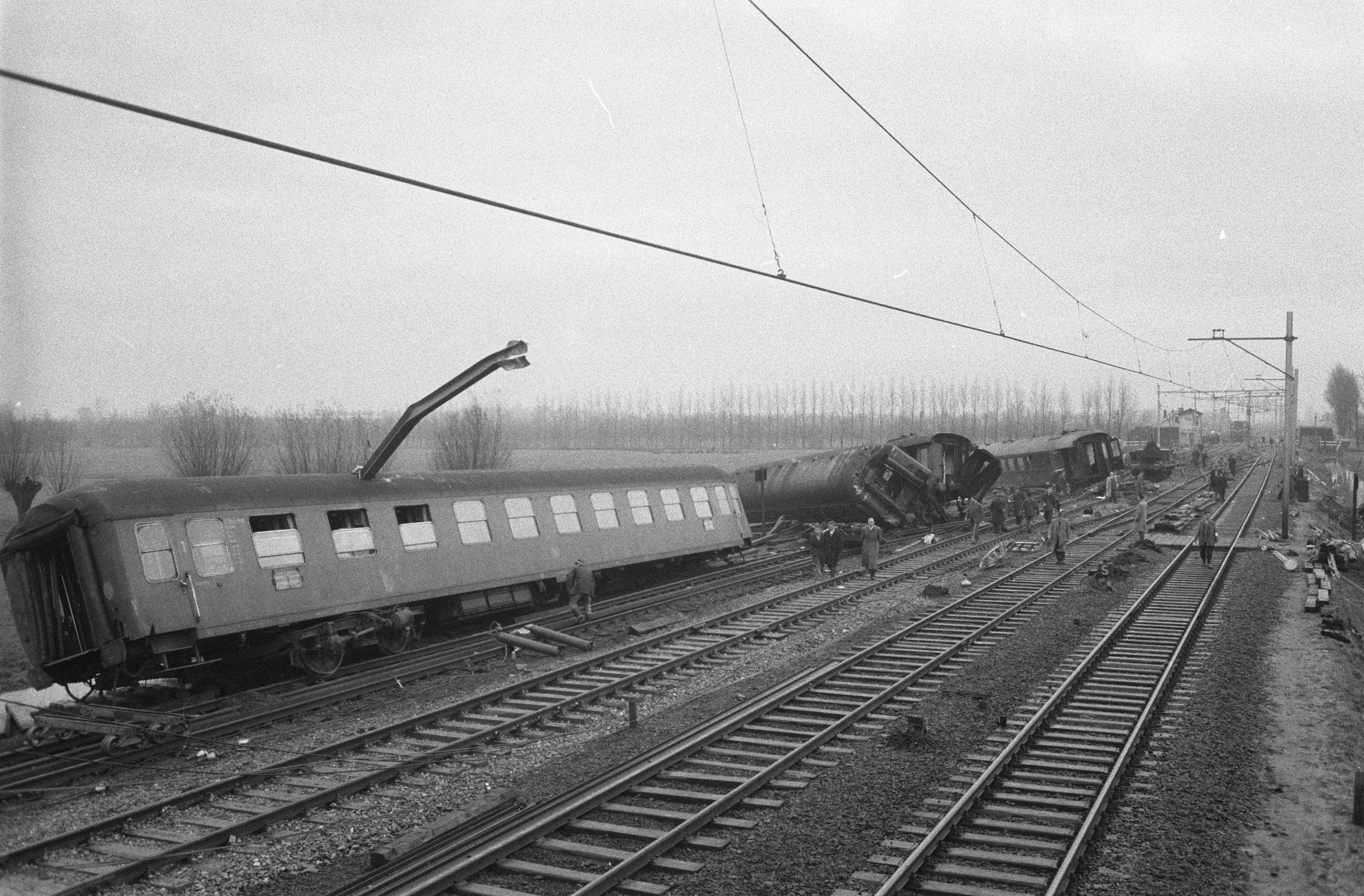
- Woerden train disaster
  November 21 – Netherlands – Woerden train disaster: A British train derailed at Woerden, killing two. Due to work on the track, a temporary speed limit of 40 km/h (25 mph) was posted with special signs, but the train was traveling at 90 km/h (56 mph) when it derailed.
- November 29 – Canada – Lamont, Alberta: A CN train collided with a school bus at a level crossing on the edge of town, killing 17 students.

== 1961 ==
- January 9 – Spain – Apparently due to a signaling fault, a Valencia-to-Barcelona express collided near Barcelona with a freight train, forming a pile of debris 30 feet (10 m) high and killing at least 21 people (including both drivers and a number of students) and injuring at least 50. Also on board was the Barcelona Espanyol soccer team, but the team suffered no injuries.
- January 31 – United States – After 18 cars of a Kansas City Southern freight train derailed near New Roads, Louisiana, a tank car of chlorine ruptured. About 1,000 people were evacuated from homes and schools. Of 50 taken to hospital, one baby boy died and six members of his family, as well as four others, were in critical condition. Many farm animals were also killed.
- February 8 – United Kingdom – A diesel multiple unit ran away and crashed through buffer stops and into houses at Royton, Lancashire before catching fire. The driver was seriously injured.
- February 11 – United Kingdom – An express freight train derailed near Rugby, Warwickshire. The wagons fouled the adjacent line, and were run into by an express passenger train. A driver was killed after being trapped on the footplate and two passengers were injured.
- February 13 – United Kingdom – An express passenger train ran into a freight train at Baschurch, Shropshire, killing three people.
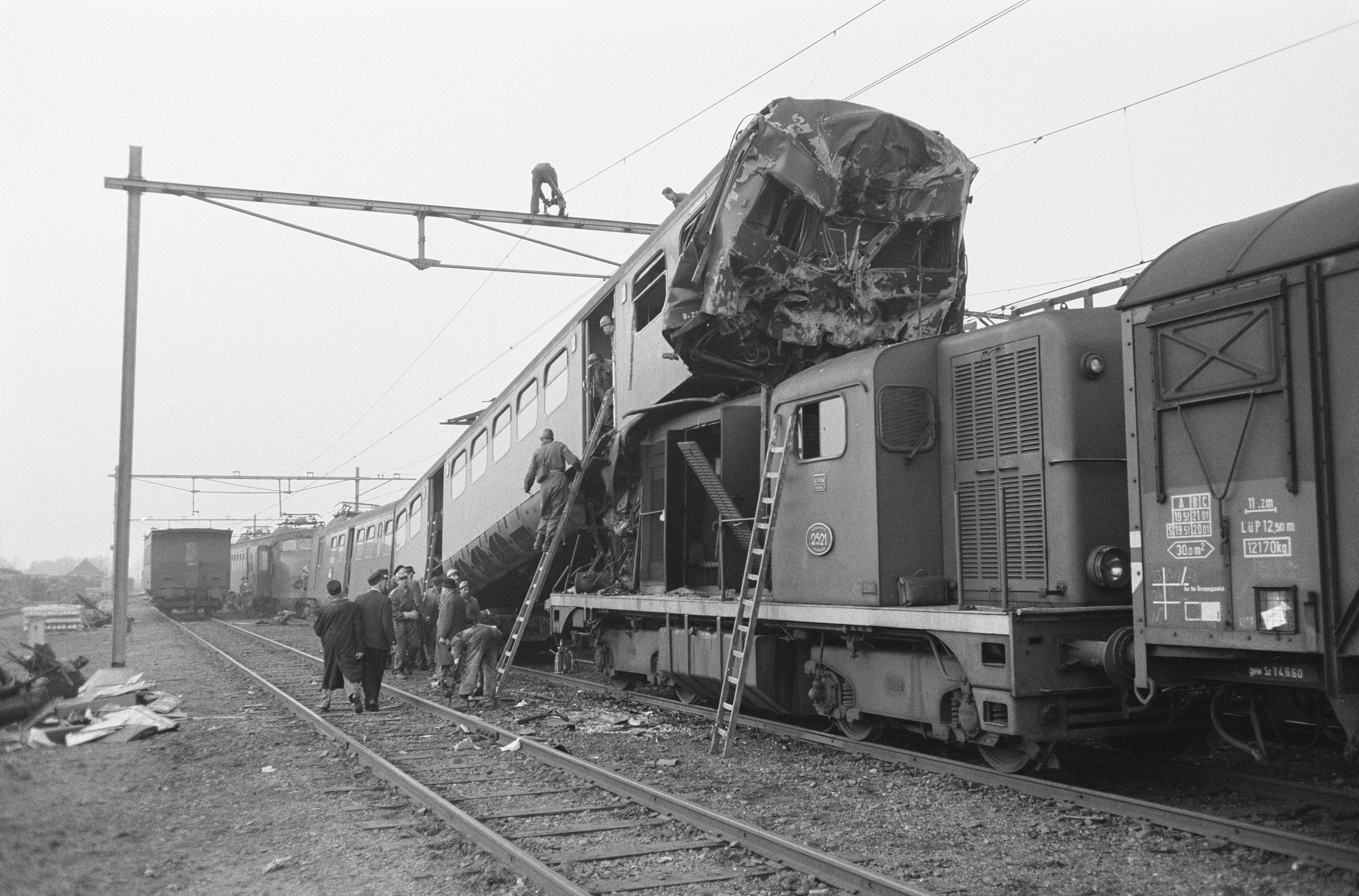
- Geldrop
  February 22 – Netherlands – A freight train and a passenger train collide at Geldrop, North Brabant.
- March 11 – Taiwan – 27 killed, 15 injured after a southbound passenger train (#3001 Diesel Limited Express) smashed into a truck carrying soldiers at a level crossing between Linfengyin and Longtien, Tainan.
- March 20 – United Kingdom – A diesel-electric multiple unit and an electric multiple unit collided at Cannon Street, London after the latter's driver misread signals. Twelve people were injured.
- March 30 – Italy – A 7-car Rapido express train from Turin to Rome was destroyed by fire in a tunnel near Sestri Levante. At least five were killed and more than 70 injured.
- April 11 – United Kingdom – An electric multiple unit overran signals and crashed into another at Waterloo station, killing one person and injuring fourteen.
- April 19 – India – Sabotaged track derailed a passenger train at Siliguri, killing 23 people and injuring 77, 28 seriously.
- May 22 – United States – Arlington, Oregon: A Union Pacific freight train derailed, killing two people, sending twenty rail cars off the track, and catching on fire.
- June 13 – West Germany – On a section of temporary single-track working at Esslingen am Neckar, a local train ran past signals and collided head-on with another on an embankment, killing 35 people.
- July 8 – Taiwan – 48 were killed, 28 injured after a southbound passenger train (#11 Limited Express) smashed into a bus at a level crossing in Minxong, Chiayi County.
- July 16 – United Kingdom – Singleton Bank rail crash: The 8:50 diesel multiple unit train from Colne to Fleetwood collided with the rear of a ballast train at about 45 miles per hour (72 km/h) near Weeton, Lancashire, England. Seven were killed (the driver and six passengers) and 116 were injured.
- October 5 – West Germany – In Hamburg, between the Hauptbahnhof and nearby Berliner Tor station, an S-Bahn train ran past signals and crashed into a work train loaded with 50-foot (15 m) girders, some of which crashed into the passenger cars; 28 people were killed and 55 injured.
- October 26 – Japan – On the Ōita Kōtsu company's line from Ōita to Beppu, a massive landslide derailed and buried a tramcar carrying 66 passengers; 32 people were killed and everyone else on board was injured.
- October 29 – India – A derailment due to excessive speed, between Mainpuri and Bhongaon, killed 22 people and injured 62.
- December 14 – United States – Auburn, Colorado – Greeley bus disaster: The Union Pacific passenger train "City of Denver" en route to Denver collided with a school bus carrying 36 children bound for Delta and Arlington elementary schools, Meeker Junior High, and Greeley High. Twenty of the children were killed.
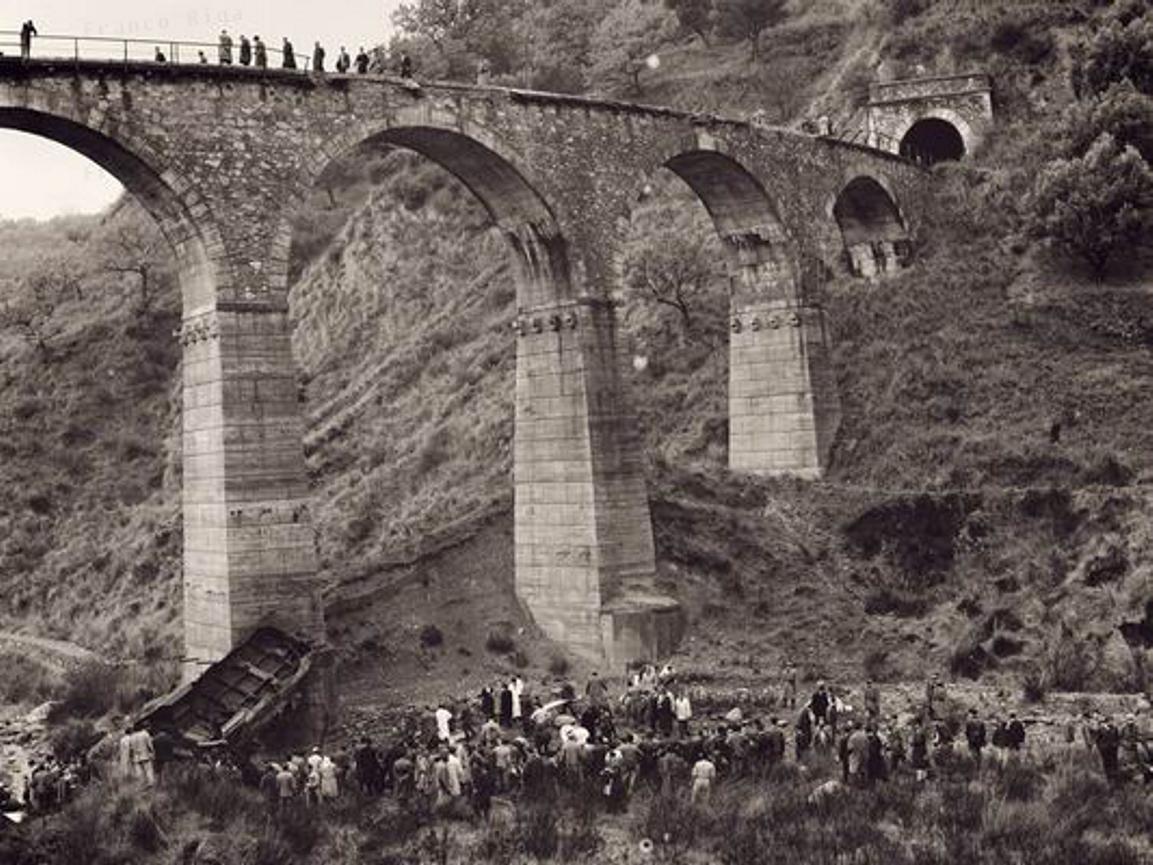
- Fiumarella rail disaster
  December 23 – Italy – Fiumarella rail disaster: a Cosenza–Catanzaro train derailed on a bridge near Catanzaro. Seventy people died and 27 were injured.
- December 26 – United States – One person died and 38 people sustained non-life-threatening injuries after four cars of a train derailed while rounding the curve just north of York–Dauphin station, Philadelphia.

== 1962 ==
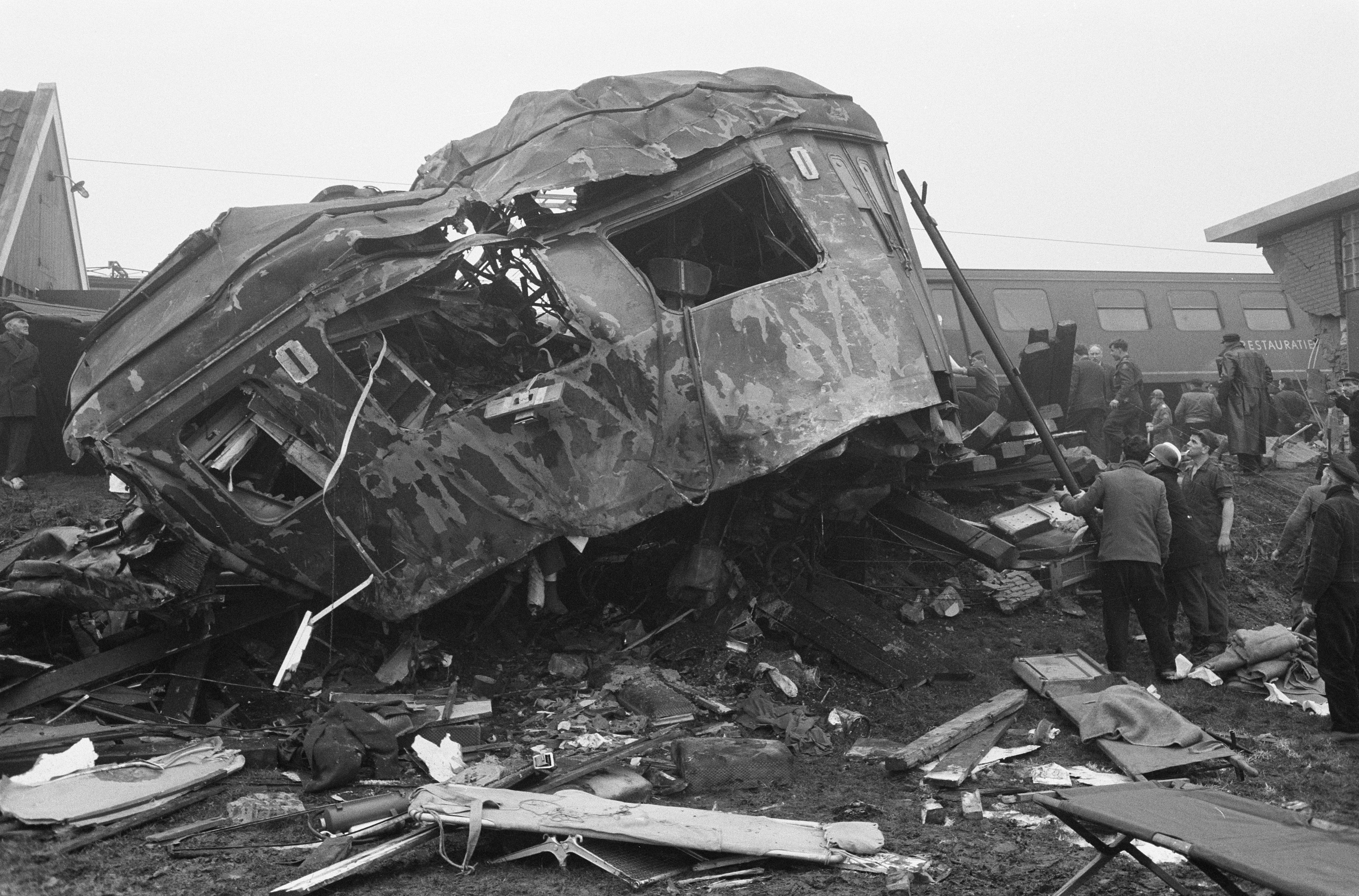
- Harmelen train disaster
  January 8 – Netherlands – The Harmelen train disaster, the deadliest railway accident in the history of The Netherlands occurred after the Utrecht–Rotterdam express train driver missed a warning signal in fog and passed a red signal to collide nearly head-on with another passenger train from Rotterdam to Amsterdam. Ninety-one people (including both drivers) died on the scene, 54 were injured of whom two died in hospital.
- February 5 – United Kingdom – A passenger train met a rear-end collision with a freight train at Polmont, Stirlingshire due to a signalman's error, injuring five people.
- February 22 – Colombia – A passenger train from Buenaventura to Cali collided head-on on a single track, near its destination, with a freight train; 40 people were killed, all in the first 4 cars of the passenger train, and 67 injured.
- March 1 – East Germany – Trebbin rail accident: An express passenger train near Trebbin collided with a cannon barrel of a tank, which was being transported on a Soviet mixed military train, pushing the tank of its flatbed derailing the military train. Nearly 100 soldiers on the military train were killed, and one passenger died aboard the express train.
- March 3 – Italy – Castel Bolognese train disaster. The Bari–Milan train derailed while entering the station of Castel Bolognese, Ravenna, killing 13 and injuring 80.
- April 17 – Thailand – At Padang Besar, seven people were killed in a collision of two passenger trains.
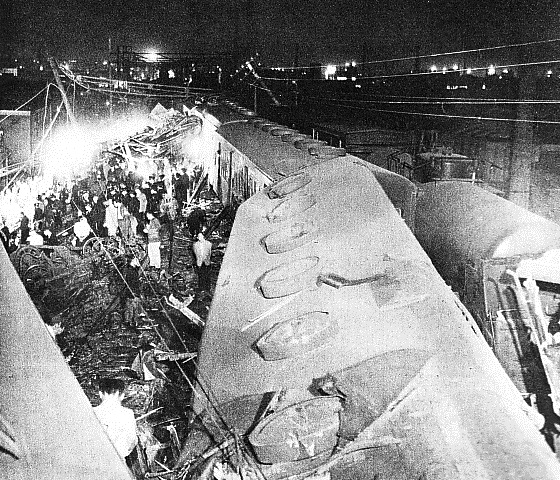
- 1962 Mikawashima train crash in Arakawa, Tokyo
  May 3 – Japan – Mikawashima train crash: A freight train passed a danger signal and was diverted safely into a siding at Mikawashima Station in Tokyo, but derailed at the end of it, fouling the adjacent track. A 6-car commuter train bound for Toride then crashed into the wreckage, and another train bound for Ueno crashed into the new wreckage as well as passengers trying to evacuate from the previous crash. Altogether 160 people were killed and 296 injured.
- May 10 – USSR – Two crowded commuter trains collided while one of them was stopped at a junction in the north part of Moscow. Foreign newspapermen and diplomats living nearby reported seeing scores of ambulances, but Soviet authorities tried to hush up the news. The accident occurred on National Railway Day.
- May 18 – United States – The Laurentian, a Delaware and Hudson passenger train traveling from Montreal to Albany derailed next to Waterford Rural Cemetery. A crewmember suffered serious wounds and died in hospital, and 7 passengers were injured.
- May 31 – Italy – Voghera train crash; a freight train collided with a passenger train at Voghera railway station, Lombardy, killing 63 and injuring 40.
- June 3 – United Kingdom – Lincoln rail crash: The Night Scotsman express passenger train derailed at Lincoln due to excessive speed on a curve, killing nine people and injuring 49.
- June 8 – India – At Bhilai, 11 coaches of a passenger train were blown over by wind during a cyclone, killing 9 people and injuring 123.
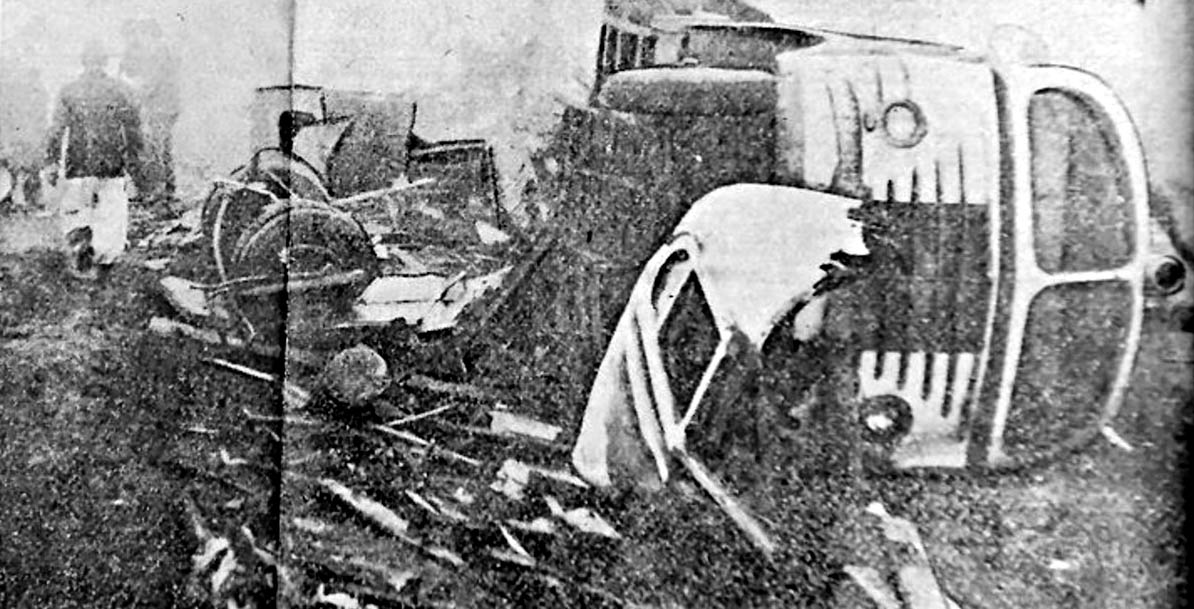
- Villa Soldati bus-train collision
  June 11 – Argentina – Villa Soldati level crossing tragedy: 42 people were killed and 88 were injured after a bus was hit by an express train in Villa Soldati in southwest Buenos Aires.
- July 21 – India – A mail train from Amritsar to Howrah collided at Buxar with a freight train being shunted on the main line; reportedly, the signal operators fled the scene. At least 48 people were killed and 55 seriously injured.
- July 22 – Romania – A passenger train derailed between Bucharest and Mogoșoaia due to excess speed, killing 32 people.
- July 23 – France – Velars-sur-Ouche, Bourgogne: A Paris–Marseille express train derailed, killing at least 39 people and injuring another 49.
- July 28 – United States – A 9-car Pennsylvania Railroad train from Harrisburg to Philadelphia, carrying baseball fans to a Philadelphia-Pittsburgh game, derailed at Steelton. Three cars were in use—the rest were reserved for passengers boarding later—and those three cars fell into the Susquehanna River valley, one landing in the river. The crash killed 19 people and injured 119. A railroad spokesman said the track was apparently out of alignment.
- August 1 – United Kingdom – A passenger train formed of electric multiple units derailed at Barnham station, West Sussex after an electrical fault caused a point motor to operate a set of points as the train approached. Thirty-eight people were injured.
- August 25 – United Kingdom – A passenger train came to a halt near Torquay, Devon due to a fault in the diesel locomotive hauling it. Another passenger train rear-ended it due to driver error, injuring 23 people.
- October 5 – France – Part of a freight train going to Dijon derailed near Montbard. The following train, the Aquilon, was safely stopped by signals, but the other track was fouled and a 3-car Cisalpin train from Milan to Paris crashed into the wreckage, killing 9 people.
- October 9 – Poland – Moszczenica (near Piotrków Trybunalski): Warsaw–Budapest express slammed into derailed cars of the regional Gliwice–Warsaw express. Official death toll was 34 people killed and 67 injured, but the real toll was probably far higher.
- October 16 – United Kingdom – A London Transport electric multiple unit was rear-ended by a British Railways EMU near Watford Junction, Hertfordshire, injuring 11 people.
- November 5 – Yugoslavia – Passenger train Belgrade-Skopje derailed at the Tabanovce train station near Kumanovo (now in North Macedonia), killing 25 people and injuring 19.
- November 11 – India – As passenger train 67 crossed the Gogra (now Ghaghara) Bridge at Manjhi (near Chhapra) in the North Eastern Railway zone with people riding on the roof, 28 people were knocked off and killed by the bridge superstructure, which was 20 inches (50 cm) above roof level, and two seriously injured.
- November 30 – Canada – A Canadian Pacific Railway tank car developed a crack, causing 30 short tons (27 t) of chlorine to leak out while it sat on a siding in Cornwall, Ontario. More than 100 people required hospitalization.
- December 26 – United Kingdom – Coppenhall Junction railway accident: Because the lineside telephones were out of order, the driver of a Glasgow-to-London train could not speak to the signalman, but could see the next signal ahead, so he decided to advance cautiously only to run into a train. The resulting collision killed 18 people.

== 1963 ==
- January 4 – India – In the North Eastern Railway zone, two trains collided at Umeshnagar, near Monghyr (now Munger). One source indicates 37 were killed and 86 injured; another, 42 killed and over 100 injured.
- March 18 – Brazil – After a Rio de Janeiro commuter train stalled, passengers went onto the tracks and were struck by an express train on another track; at least 12 of them were killed.
- April 11 – Indonesia – An express from Jakarta to Bandung derailed near its destination. One heavily loaded car fell into a ravine, rolling over several times; altogether 37 people were killed.
- April 28 – United States – A freight train derailed near Dillsburg, Pennsylvania, leaking chlorine gas before detonating, with its mushroom cloud being seen for miles.
- May 27 – United Kingdom – A Romney, Hythe and Dymchurch Railway train from Hythe to New Romney, hauled by Hercules suffered a fault in its brake system. The driver managed to get the train running, but at only 3 mph (5 km/h). The train was run into by the following train, hauled by Typhoon, derailing a number of carriages and causing several injuries.
- May 28 – Portugal – While one train was loading and another was unloading at Cais do Sodré station in Lisbon, the roof over the platforms collapsed. About 50 people were killed and many more injured.
- August 2 – Uruguay – Saboteurs tampered with a track switch 8 miles (13 km) from Montevideo, diverting a 3-car passenger train into a siding where it crashed into freight cars at 45 mph (72 km/h). At least 30 people were killed and 100 injured.
- August 9 – United States – While a Pennsylvania Railroad tank car holding 80,000 US gallons (300,000 L) of chlorine was being unloaded at a chemical plant in Philadelphia, the line broke and the gas was released. Two hundred and seventy-five people required hospitalization.
- August 15 – United Kingdom – Knowle and Dorridge rail crash: An express passenger train collided with a freight train at Knowle and Dorridge station, Warwickshire due to a signalman's error, killing three people.
- September 17 – United States – Chualar bus crash – A freight train collided with a bus carrying 58 migrant farmworkers at a railroad crossing outside Chualar, California, killing 32 people and injuring 25. The crash ranks as the deadliest automobile accident in the United States to date, according to the National Safety Council.
- November 9 – Japan – Tsurumi rail accident: a twelve-car Yokosuka–Tokyo commuter train collided with three cars of a freight train which had derailed, and then collided head-on with the Tokyo–Zushi commuter train during slow speed, which crushed four passenger cars at Tsurumi–Shin-Koyasu, Yokosuka and Tokaido Line, Yokohama, killing at least 161 people, another 120 were injured.
- December 5 – Ireland – Mullingar, County Westmeath: A broken-down passenger train was run into by the locomotive sent to rescue it, injuring 16 people.
- December 24 – Hungary – A collision near Szolnok killed 45 people; one of the drivers was held responsible and sentenced to 11 years in prison.

== 1964 ==
- February 1 – Argentina – Altamirano rail disaster – near Buenos Aires: A diesel-hauled Mar del Plata–Buenos Aires Firefly Express with 1,040 passengers on board collided head-on with a steam-hauled freight train. Both locomotives exploded in the collision, spreading burning diesel fuel over a wide area and setting the first three coaches on fire, killing 34. A fault in the points (switch) was blamed, allowing the express to be diverted in the path of the freight train.
- February 15 – Brazil – Two wooden cars of a train from Petrópolis to Rio de Janeiro derailed and fell into a ravine, killing at least three people and injuring 20.
- March 8 – India – An express from Madras to Calcutta (now Chennai and Kolkata, respectively) collided with a stationary freight train at Baudpur, about 40 mi (64 km) southwest of Balasore, killing 22.
- May 28 – United Kingdom – A passenger train derailed at Cheadle Hulme, Cheshire due to excessive speed on a curve. Three people were killed, 27 were hospitalized.
- July 26 – Portugal – While approaching Porto, an Automara train speeding around a curve at Custóias at about 60 mph (100 km/h) saw its rear car break free, derail, and smash into an overbridge in Portugal's worst ever train accident. Ninety-four people died.
- July 29 – South Africa – A derailment near Randfontein killed at least 21 people.
- August 21 – Canada – At a level crossing in Leonard, Ontario (about 32 km [20 mi] east of Ottawa), a truck loaded with gravel smashed into a Canadian Pacific Railway train from Ottawa to Montreal, derailing the last 3 cars of the 7-car train. The truck driver and 7 train passengers were killed; at least 20 were injured.
- September 6 – Sweden – An express train from Stockholm derailed near Ånge, killing 8 people and injuring 35.
- October 5 – United Kingdom – Two passenger trains (the 08:20 Kings Cross–Doncaster and 09:00 Kings Cross–Newcastle) collided in dense fog near Finsbury Park after the wrong signal was given. The only injury was to the driver, who had to be cut from the train.
- December 20 – Mexico – A freight train collided at about 45 mph (72 km/h) with the rear of a passenger train at Tacotalpa, killing at least 46 and injuring 26. Another source indicates 42 killed and at 75 critically injured.
- December 20 – Italy – Just outside the station for Pompeii, a stopped southbound passenger train was rear-ended by another train, killing three passengers and injuring nearly 100 more.
- December 22–23 – India – At about midnight, during the 1964 Rameswaram cyclone, train 653 from Pamban was approaching its terminus, the Palk Strait port of Dhanushkodi, when the signals failed. The driver decided to proceed, but the train was hit by a storm surge. The number of deaths is variously estimated as 115, or 128, or anywhere up to 200.
- December 23 – India – During the 1964 Rameswaram cyclone, an express from Trivandrum (now Thiruvananthapuram) to Madras (now Chennai) was derailed by a washout between Vadipatti and Kodaikanal, with four deaths and seven serious injuries.

== 1965 ==
- February 10 – Spain – A night train from Madrid to Barcelona suffered a fast-spreading fire shortly after leaving Grisén, destroying several wooden-bodied cars and killing 30 people.
- February 20 – Sweden – Two passenger trains collided at Skultorp killing ten people and injuring some 50 others.
- February 26 – Sudan – Sudan rail collision A passenger train collided head-on with a freight train about 100 kilometres north of Khartoum, Sudan killing 100-120 people.
- March 14 – United States – A T & P passenger train and crude oil tanker truck collision killed the train's engineer and fireman, who were in the cab when it struck the tanker's trailer.
- March 28 – Brazil – A passenger train crashed into derailed cars of a freight train at Commendador, killing 21 and injuring 40.
- April 5 – Brazil – A passenger train and freight train collided head-on at Três Rios, killing an estimated 40 people.
- April 17 – Canada – At Terrace Bay, Ontario, the Canadian Pacific Railway's eastbound Canadian en route from Vancouver to Toronto and Montreal was derailed by subsidence and some of the cars fell down an embankment. A baggage car employee and an apparent stowaway were killed, but most passenger injuries were minor.
- June 30 – Spain – At a level crossing in El Arahal (now Arahal), a medium-distance train crashed into a bus going from Seville to El Saucejo, killing 13 people and injuring 35.
- August 16 – Spain – A mail train to Madrid and a freight train collided head-on near Gádor, killing 11 people and injuring 65.
- August 29 – France – After the Lombardy Express from Milan to Paris stopped at Pont-d'Héry station to deal with a brake problem, another fast train braked too slowly and rear-ended it at about 20 km/h (12 mph), killing 12 or 16 people; the driver of the second train was charged with manslaughter.
- September 22 – United Kingdom – An electric multiple unit collided with a double-decker bus on a level crossing between Angmering and Goring-by-Sea, West Sussex due to errors by the crossing keeper, killing three people and injuring eight.
- October 4 – South Africa – An overcrowded passenger train carrying black workers to KwaMashu derailed at Effingham Junction near Durban; 81, 89 or 150 people are killed and hundreds injured. A white signalman was killed in retaliation by an angry crowd of black people. This is the worst rail disaster in South African history.
- December 8 – Burma – A Yangon–Mandalay nightly express train ploughed into a standing passenger train, killing 80 people and injuring 100 in Toungoo, Bago Division.
- December 18 – Spain – Express train from Irún to Lisbon collided with a local passenger train near Villar de los Álamos, Salamanca, killing 34 people. Fifty others were injured.
- December 20 – Portugal – A commuter train serving Lisbon crashed into a freight train at Algueirão. More than 40 people were believed to have been killed.

== 1966 ==
- January 2 – United States – The last two cars of the Louisville and Nashville Railroad's South Wind derailed near Franklin, Kentucky, injuring 19 passengers on board. The last car, a privately owned coach, turned over on its side, injuring the owner and several members of his family, while passengers in the next coach, which derailed but stayed upright, were injured by overhead baggage striking them in the head and back.
- January 7 – United States – D&H freight train derailed at the NY Route 206 grade crossing in Bainbridge, New York, killing 2 people.
- January 20 – Portugal – A train was swept off the tracks by a landslide near Agueda, killing at least 5 people and injuring more than 20.
- February 3 – United Kingdom – On the underground railway in a coal mine at Rotherham, a locomotive crashed into a train carrying miners, killing at least 6 and injuring 21.
- February 9 – United Kingdom – Two coaches of a London-bound commuter train caught fire as it moved at around 65 miles per hour (105 km/h) before being stopped near Radlett, 20 miles (32 km) north of London. Thirty-three persons, many of them with burns, were taken to hospitals. Others were treated beside the tracks after passengers pulled the emergency cord. The chief test pilot for the nearby Handley Page aircraft plant sounded an alarm that brought firemen and ambulances to the scene within minutes and notified a signalman to halt following trains. The fire was caused by a drive shaft, believed to have broken due to the presence of instrumentation as part of a trial, puncturing a fuel tank.
- February 16 – Yugoslavia – After a failure, a passenger train went out of control and collided with a mixed train near the Kaštel Stari train station (now in Croatia). 29 people were killed and 27 injured.
- March 7 – United States – The Great Northern Buelow wreck: The eastbound Empire Builder crashed with the westbound Western Star mail and passenger train, killing two and injuring 77.
- May 2 – India – A car carrying munitions exploded at a Central Railway marshalling yard at Bhusaval station, killing seven people and injuring 31.
- May 31 – Romania – Soon after starting from Bucharest, an express to Galați collided with a local train; 38 people were killed and 65 were injured. The country's railways minister was fired.
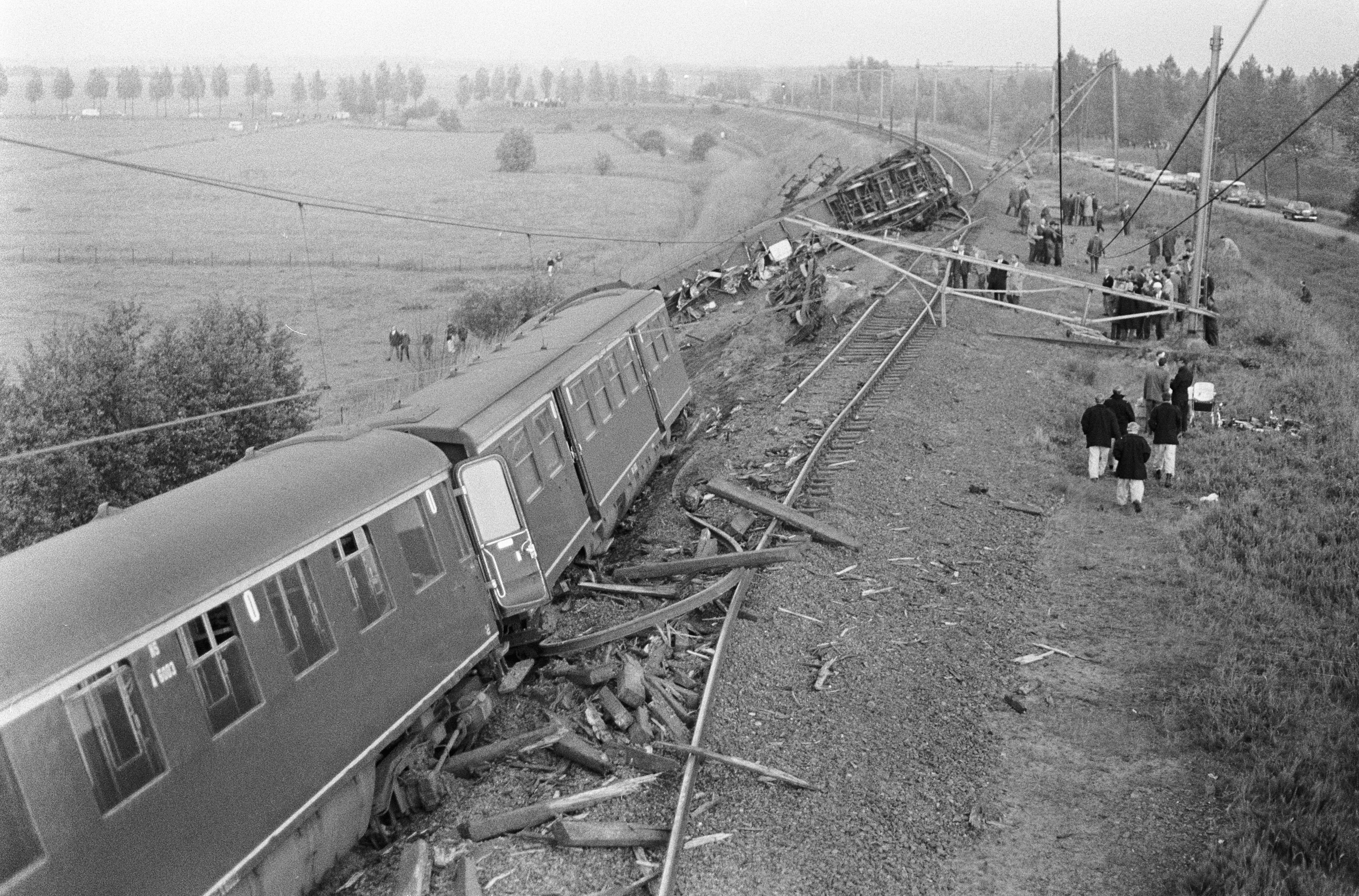
- Hedel
  May 31 – Netherlands – A passenger train derailed near Hedel, Gelderland.
- June 13 – India – Two suburban commuter EMU trains collided head-on in torrential monsoon rain between Matunga and Sion railway stations, Bombay, killing 57 and injuring 106, 42 seriously. The driving cab and the first few coaches of each train were crushed, with the other coaches telescoped into each other and climbing over the adjacent coaches. It was thought the rains might have disrupted the signalling system.
- June 19 – India – An express passenger train from Ahmedabad to New Delhi crashed into a stationary freight train near Ajmer; 15 people were killed and 38 seriously injured.
- July 13 – United States – Cherryville, North Carolina, Seaboard Air Line trains #45 and #46 hit head-on on the east side of the city killing one person and destroying 6 locomotives and derailing 22 cars.
- July 15 – United Kingdom – Kingham, Oxfordshire. An express passenger train derailed due to the movement of a switch blade on a set of points after its bolts had been removed and the blade had not been clamped. Seventeen people were injured.
- July 21 – Pakistan – A train crashed into a bus on a level crossing in Lodhran; 38 people were believed dead.
- August 1 – South Africa – A train wreck at Johannesburg caused six deaths and 297 injuries. Africans then attacked the white train crew and were fired on by police.
- September 13 – Canada – In Corner Brook, Newfoundland, a freight train crashed into a switching engine, killing three railwaymen in one of the locomotive cabs.
- October 7 – Canada – The Dorion level crossing accident: In Dorion, Quebec, a chartered school bus carrying teenage students to a dance stopped at a level crossing while a Canadian National Railway passenger train passed through, but then one or more youths deliberately raised the barrier arm although a freight train was approaching in the other direction. The bus driver started onto the crossing and the resulting collision killed him and 19 students.
- November 16 – Brazil – At Nilópolis, a suburban passenger train ran past signals and collided with another one, killing 38 people.
- November 17 – West Germany – On the line from Frankfurt to Königstein, a diesel railcar left unattended at Kelkheim-Hornau station ran away eastward at speeds reaching 100 km/h (62 mph). An attempt to derail it at Kelkheim-Münster station failed and it crashed into a westbound passenger train near Liederbach, killing 7 people and injuring 80.
- December 18 – Spain – An empty freight train running 8 hours late ran past signals as well as an emergency hand-signal at Villafranca del Campo and entered the single track toward Santa Eulalia del Campo before colliding head-on with a train of diesel railcars going from Teruel to Zaragoza, where most of the passengers were riding in the lead car; 29 people were killed.
- December 28 – United States – 1966 Everett, Massachusetts train crash: A tanker truck full of heating oil stalled on a level crossing at Everett, Massachusetts, when the brakes stuck on. A Boston and Maine Railroad train from Boston to Rockport, consisting of a single Budd RDC car, crashed into it and was engulfed in flame, killing 12 people out of about 25 on board.

== 1967 ==
- January 12 – Botswana – A Rhodesian Railways passenger train derailed between Malapiye Road and Palapiye, killing one man and seriously injuring three people.
- February 28 – United Kingdom – Stechford rail crash: The locomotive of a ballast train collided with an electric multiple unit at Stechford, Warwickshire due to errors by the driver and a shunter, killing nine people and injuring 16.
- March 5 – United Kingdom – Connington South rail crash: An express passenger train derailed at Conington, Huntingdonshire after a signalman moved a set of points under the train, killing five people and injuring 18. The signalman was subsequently convicted of endangering persons being conveyed on the railway but found not guilty on a manslaughter charge and was sentenced to two years' imprisonment.
- May 22 – United States – 1967 New York City freight train collision: Two freight trains collided in Manhattan, killing six.
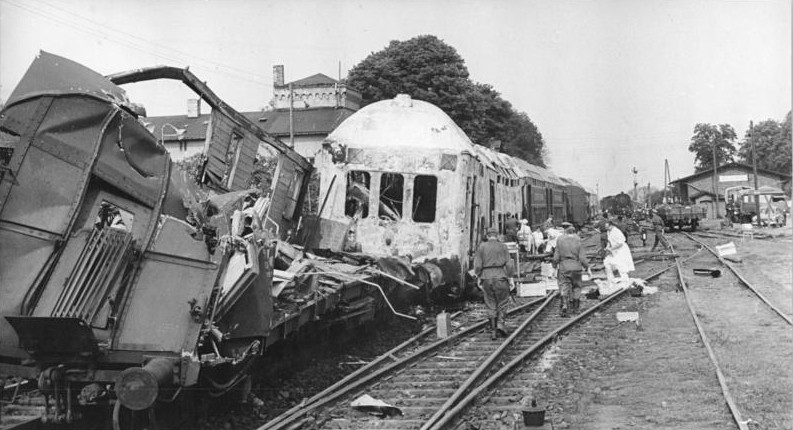
- Langenweddingen rail crash
  July 6 – East Germany – Langenweddingen level crossing disaster, Langenweddingen near Magdeburg: Because of an overstretched cable preventing the proper operation of a level crossing's barriers, a local train collided with a lorry carrying 15,000 litres of light petrol and ignited. Ninety-four people were killed, of whom 44 were children on a holiday outing. After the accident, barrier-dependent train signalling was introduced on the DR network.
- July 31 – United Kingdom – Thirsk rail crash, an express train from King's Cross to Edinburgh collided with the wreckage of a derailed freight train. Seven were killed and 45 injured, 15 seriously.
- August 2 – Canada – At Dunrankin, Ontario, on the Canadian National Railways, a freight train emerging from a siding collided head-on with the westbound Super Continental. All four engine crewmen were killed.
- September 17 – United States – On the Mount Washington Cog Railway in New Hampshire, a wrongly set switch derailed a train. The passenger car rolled 400 feet (120 m) down the mountain, killing 8 people and injuring 70 more.
- November 5 – United Kingdom – Hither Green rail crash, a broken rail caused a derailment resulting in 49 deaths.
- December 15 – Canada – Two Canadian National Railways locomotives on a siding at Boston Bar, British Columbia, were apparently deliberately started and left to run away unmanned on the main line. They traveled 8 1/2 miles (14 km) before colliding with a 95-car freight train in a 470-foot (140 m) tunnel, killing a railwayman and injuring several.

== 1968 ==
- January 6 – United Kingdom – Hixon rail crash, England: A Manchester-London express struck a vehicle carrying a 120-long-ton (120-metric-ton) transformer at an automatic level crossing, killing 11 people and seriously injuring 27.
- January 24 – France – An 8-car express train to Paris consisting of cars from Brig, Bern, Interlaken (all in Switzerland), and Pontarlier derailed near Arbois when the driver, impaired by alcohol, drove at about 135 kilometres per hour (84 mph) into a tunnel with a limit of 85 km/h. Two railwaymen were killed and 33 people injured. The driver was prosecuted (although not for intoxication) and received a 5-month prison sentence.
- January 27 – Brazil – At General Câmara, an accident with a train heading for Porto Alegre killed 52 people, or killed 41 people and injured 57.
- February 27 – Canada – A Canadian National Railways train struck a rockslide near Boston Bar in Fraser Canyon, causing a locomotive to fall 150 ft (50 m) into the river and kill two crew members.
- March 15 – Spain – On a downgrade near Las Navas del Marqués, a work train ran away, passed signals at Santa María de la Alameda, and ran onto the section from there to Robledo de Chavela, where it collided with a Tren Español Rápido DMU train en route from Madrid to Ávila, with both trains moving at about 100 km/h (60 mph). Twenty-eight people were killed and about 80 were injured, 50 seriously.
- March 16 – Canada – At Pefferlaw, Ontario, a train had not completed its pull into a siding when it was struck by another train either misreading the lights or the lighting signals indicating a clear track ahead. The brakeman and 2 others died, four were injured. Both trains were operated by Canadian National Railways.
- March 19 – India – At Yalvigi, the Deccan Express from Poona (now Pune) to Bangalore (now Bengaluru) collided head-on with a local train; at least 40 were killed and 38 injured.
- June 24 – Switzerland – Sion: A freight train collided head-on with a train carrying passengers on an outing. Both drivers and 10 passengers were killed; 103 were injured, 17 seriously.
- July 1 – France – At Quincieux, nine cars of an express from Paris to Marseille derailed, possibly due to buckling of the track in the 100 °F (38 °C) heat; 6 people were killed and 91 injured.
- August 5 – United States – At Eloise, near Winter Haven, Florida, a vandal moved a temporary replacement CTC signaling cable on the Seaboard Coast Line Railroad so that a train ran over it. The northbound and southbound Silver Meteor trains (operating between New York and Miami) would normally have passed at Eloise. Due to the malfunction, both trains were given stop signals, but the switch was not set to take the northbound train onto the siding as it normally would be, and the CTC dispatcher did not warn the trains. On the northbound train the fireman was checking out a fault indication and the engineer, driving alone, missed the signals. The trains collided on the main line at about 50 miles per hour (80 km/h) and were seriously derailed. One passenger was killed; 202 passengers (including Charles Edison) and 28 crew were injured, 29 people needing hospitalization.
- August 26 – Canada – In a landslide-prone area of the Canadian Pacific Railway 11 miles (18 km) west of Revelstoke, British Columbia, a boulder weighing 4 tons smashed into the eastbound Canadian, derailing six other cars. One passenger was killed and two admitted to hospital.
- September 15 – United States – San Antonio, Texas: At the HemisFair, a monorail train derailed, killing one person.
- September 16 – Canada – In Oakville, Ontario, a 6-car Canadian National Railways Tempo train from Sarnia to Toronto, Ontario, ran over a switch at excessive speed and derailed, killing one passenger who happened to be walking between cars at the time and fell out. Eight people were injured. The coroner's inquest jury found that the engine crew had misread signals in fog.
- September 20 - Indonesia - 116 people were killed and 84 people were seriously injured after two passenger trains collided in Ratujaya, Cipayung, Depok.
- October 1 – Greece – Two trains carrying people returning to Athens after voting in their home towns in a constitutional referendum collided at Corinth, killing 34 people and injuring 150, resulting as the deadliest rail accident in Greece of all time before the Tempi train crash in 2023 and the worst Greek rail accident of the 20th century.
- October 7 – Romania – Bucerdea Grânoasă: A fast passenger train collided head-on with a local train, killing 22 people and injuring 72.
- November 21 – Canada – On the outskirts of Peterborough, Ontario, a Canadian National Railways local freight train from Peterborough to Lindsay crashed at about 35 miles per hour (56 km/h) into a school bus, which was dragged along the tracks. The bus driver said he was "taking a run" uphill on the snow-covered road and did not hear any whistle over the children on board. Two teenagers were killed and about 30 injured.
- December 12 – Hungary – Mende: A fast passenger train collided head-on with a freight train, killing 43 people and injuring 60.

== 1969 ==
- January 4 – United Kingdom – Marden rail crash, a passenger train rear-ended a parcels train after passing a signal at danger, killing four people and injuring eleven.
- February 3 – Pakistan – On a level crossing near Lahore, a train and bus collided, killing 29 people and injuring 11.
- February 7 – Australia – Violet Town rail accident Victoria, A Southern Aurora train collided onto an Albury train, killing nine people and injuring 117.
- February 9 – Dahomey (now Benin) – Two trains collided 12 miles (20 km) northwest of Cotonou, killing 10 people and seriously injuring 25.
- February 18 – United States – On the Chicago, Burlington and Quincy Railroad, part of a 98-car freight train from Denver to Chicago derailed at 6:30 a.m. in Crete, Nebraska, and crashed into a tank car of anhydrous ammonia, parked on a siding, which exploded. Ammonia fumes and the explosion killed eight people: five local residents and three who were riding the train illegally. Nearly 500 others were evacuated.
- May 7 – United Kingdom – A passenger train derailed at Morpeth, Northumberland due to excessive speed on a curve, killing six people and injuring 21.
- July 15 – India – A freight train rear-ended a passenger train 25 miles (40 km) north of Cuttack, killing at least 100 people.
- July 30 – Yugoslavia – Between Tetovo and Gostivar (both now in North Macedonia), a 2-car diesel railcar collided head-on with three tank cars running away downhill; 29 people were killed and 17 injured. Staff at Gostivar station were arrested for negligence.
- August 20 – United States – Darien, Connecticut: Two New York, New Haven and Hartford Railroad electric multiple units collided head-on along the single-track New Canaan Branch due to crew's disregard of train orders, killing three crew and one passenger.
- December 31 – Senegal – A train from Dakar to St-Louis collided near Thiès with a goods train, killing at least 20.

== See also ==
- Lists of traffic collisions – includes level crossing accidents
- List of rail accidents in the United Kingdom
- List of Russian rail accidents
- List of years in rail transport

== Sources ==
- Earnshaw, Alan (1989). Trains in Trouble: Vol. 5. Penryn: Atlantic Books. ISBN 0-906899-35-4.
- Earnshaw, Alan (1990). Trains in Trouble: Vol. 6. Penryn: Atlantic Books. ISBN 0-906899-37-0.
- Earnshaw, Alan (1991). Trains in Trouble: Vol. 7. Penryn: Atlantic Books. ISBN 0-906899-50-8.
- Earnshaw, Alan (1993). Trains in Trouble: Vol. 8. Penryn: Atlantic Books. ISBN 0-906899-52-4.
- Glover, John (2001). Southern Electric. Hersham: Ian Allan. ISBN 0-7110-2807-9.
- Haine, Edgar A. (1993). Railroad wrecks. Associated University Presses. ISBN 978-0-8453-4844-4.
- Hall, Stanley (1990). The Railway Detectives. London: Ian Allan. ISBN 0-7110-1929-0.
- Hoole, Ken (1982). Trains in Trouble: Vol. 3. Redruth: Atlantic Books. ISBN 0-906899-05-2.
- Hoole, Ken (1983). Trains in Trouble: Vol. 4. Truro: Atlantic Books. ISBN 0-906899-07-9.
- Kitchenside, Geoffrey (1997). Great Train Disasters. Bristol: Siena Books. ISBN 0-75252-630-8.
- Moody, G. T. (1979) [1957]. Southern Electric 1909–1979 (Fifth ed.). Shepperton: Ian Allan Ltd. ISBN 0-7110-0924-4.
- Shaw, Robert B. (1978). A History of Railroad Accidents, Safety Precautions and Operating Practices. LCCN 78104064.
- Semmens, Peter (1994). Railway Disasters of the World: Principal Passenger Train Accidents of the 20th Century. Patrick Stephens Ltd. ISBN 1-85260-323-2.
- Trevena, Arthur (1981). Trains in Trouble: Vol. 2. Redruth: Atlantic Books. ISBN 0-906899-03-6.
- Vaughan, Adrian (1989). Obstruction Danger. Wellingborough: Patrick Stephens Limited. ISBN 1-85260-055-1.
- Vaughan, Adrian (2003) [2000]. Tracks to Disaster. Hersham: Ian Allan. ISBN 0-7110-2985-7.
