= Garden City, Colorado =

Town in Colorado, United States

- Statutory Town
- Town of Garden City
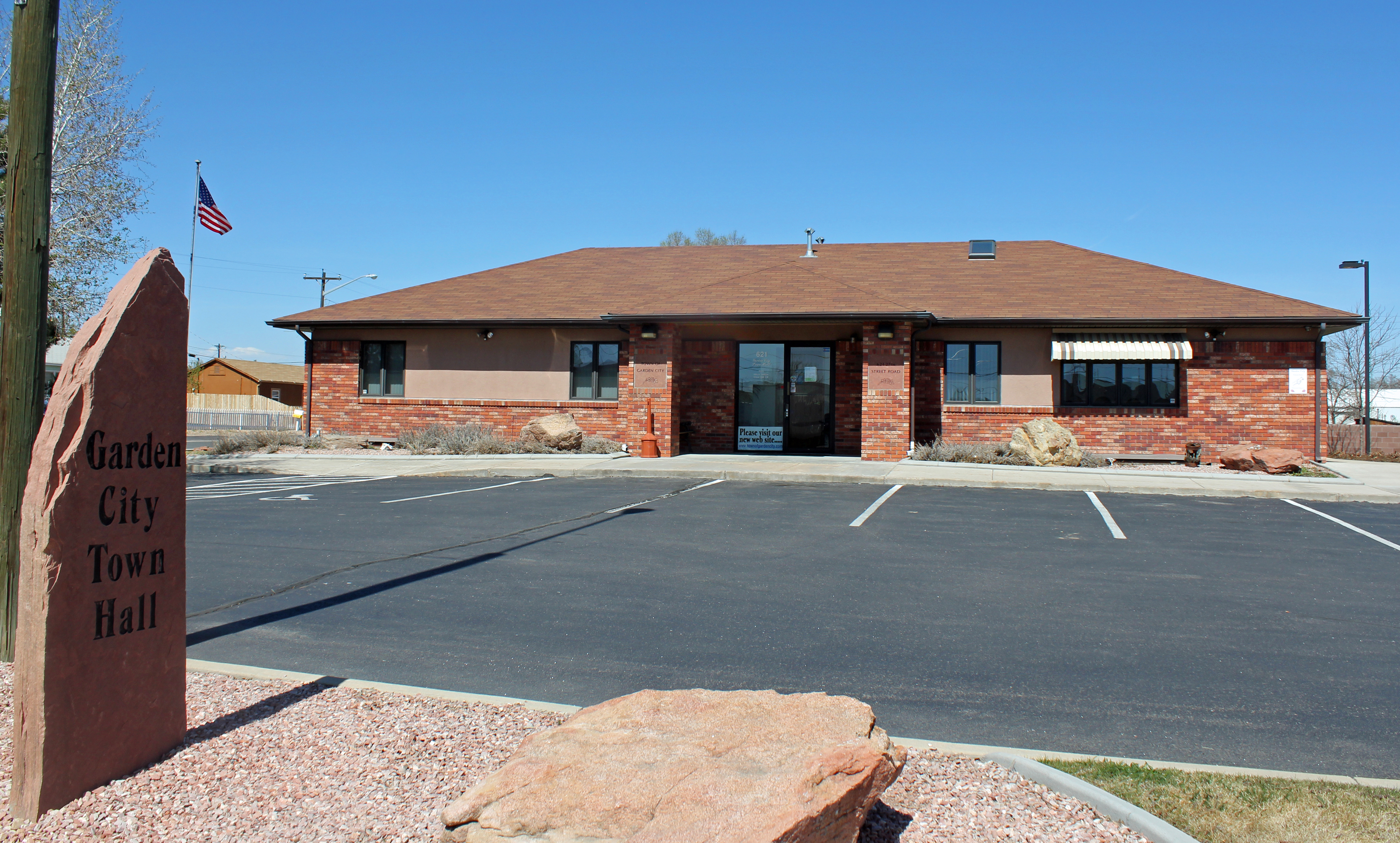
- The Garden City Town Hall

- Location of the Town of Garden City in Weld County, Colorado.
- Coordinates: 40°23′41″N 104°41′22″W
- Country: United States
- State: Colorado
- County: Weld County
- Founded: 1935
- Incorporated (town) Initial filing: September 14, 1936
- Incorporated (town) Uncontested Filing: August 2, 1938

Government
  - Type: Statutory Town

Area
  - Total: 0.113 sq mi (0.292 km^{2})
  - Land: 0.113 sq mi (0.292 km^{2})
  - Water: 0 sq mi (0.000 km^{2})
- Elevation: 4,698 ft (1,432 m)

Population (2020)
  - Total: 254
  - Density: 2,250/sq mi (870/km^{2})
- Time zone: UTC−07:00 (MST)
  - Summer (DST): UTC−06:00 (MDT)
- ZIP code: 80631
- Area code: 970
- FIPS code: 08-29185
- GNIS feature ID: 2412667
- Website: townofgardencity.com

The Town of Garden City is a Statutory Town located in Weld County, Colorado, United States. The town population was 254 at the 2020 United States census. Garden City is a part of the Greeley, CO Metropolitan Statistical Area and the Front Range Urban Corridor. It is surrounded by the cities of Greeley and Evans, Colorado.

== Geography ==
At the 2020 United States census, the town had a total area of 72 acres (0.292 km^{2}), all of it land.

== Demographics ==
Historical population
Census	Pop.	Note	%±
1940	87		—
1950	104		19.5%
1960	129		24.0%
1970	142		10.1%
1980	85		−40.1%
1990	199		134.1%
2000	357		79.4%
2010	234		−34.5%
2020	254		8.5%
U.S. Decennial Census

== History ==
Garden City was founded on August 2, 1938, as a base for saloons and liquor stores serving residents of nearby Greeley, Colorado, which was then a Dry City. Shortly after the repeal of Prohibition in the United States, in June 1935, Greeley voters, by a majority of 356 votes, voted in the local option election to make Greeley "dry" and prohibit the sale, manufacture, transportation, or possession of liquor in the city limits of Greeley. The morning following the election, two Greeley liquor stores were closed by the Chief of Police. The Greeley Tribune published several articles about a Wet Town incorporating Greeley's southern edge.

This area was home to a 10-acre area known at the time as Ray's Cottage Camp, owned by Mrs. A.F. Ray. The law for incorporating a town at the time required a petition to be filled with Weld County of 30 or more residents who were also landowners. Mrs. Ray sold cabins and lots in her Cottage Camp for as little as $100.00 so that Garden City could meet the petition criteria.

According to Tribune articles written at the time, the incorporation of Garden City was challenged and found to be invalid twice but Garden City did finally become incorporated on the third attempt in 1938. According to the incorporation document on file in the Clerk's Office, the incorporation date was August 2, 1938.

== Education ==
Garden City is within Weld County School District Six. As of 2008 residents are zoned to Jackson Elementary School, Brentwood Middle School, and Greeley Central High School. All of the schools assigned to Garden City are in Greeley.

== See also ==
- Greeley, CO Metropolitan Statistical Area
- Denver-Aurora-Greeley, CO Combined Statistical Area
- Front Range Urban Corridor
