= Greeley High School =

Greeley High School may refer to:

- Greeley Central High School in Greeley, Colorado
- Greeley West High School in Greeley, Colorado
- Greeley High School (Greeley, Nebraska) in Greeley, Nebraska
- Horace Greeley High School in Chappaqua, New York
