= Auburn, Colorado =

Unincorporated community in Weld County, Colorado, United States

- unincorporated community
- Location of Auburn, Colorado. Auburn (Colorado)
- Coordinates: 40°22′05″N 104°38′12″W
- Country: United States
- State: Colorado
- County: Weld

Government
  - Type: unincorporated community
  - Body: Weld County
- Elevation: 4,652 ft (1,418 m)
- Time zone: UTC−07:00 (MST)
  - Summer (DST): UTC−06:00 (MDT)
- GNIS pop ID: 180729
- GNIS town ID: 180729

Auburn is an unincorporated community in Weld County, Colorado, United States, five miles southeast of Downtown Greeley.

== History ==
In the 1960s, Auburn was a farming community with no general stores and no post office. Many of the families were first, second, and third generation immigrants with German-Russian, Mexican, and Swedish heritage. Families attended Baptist, Catholic, and Congregational churches in Greeley, Gilcrest, and Platteville.

On December 14, 1961, Union Pacific's "City of Denver" passenger train collided with a school bus, killing twenty children who were on board. Sixteen children and the driver survived. The crash was the deadliest traffic accident in Colorado history.

== Education ==
The Auburn area is now within Weld County School District Six. As of 2008, residents are zoned to Bella Romero Academy of Applied Technology K-3 (formerly East Memorial Elementary, named for the school bus tragedy) Bella Romero 4-8 Elementary School east of Greeley at the site of the former Delta Elementary School, Heath Middle School in Greeley, and Greeley West High School in Greeley.

For many years, Auburn had a school district and a school at the northeast corner of Weld County Roads 47 and 54. A legislative study posted by the mid-1950s recommended reorganizing Colorado's school districts and declared school district reorganization as the state's main priority. Between 1956 and 1961, nearly 700 school districts closed, leaving 275 open. As a consequence, many small schools in Colorado began to close as a result of the district closures. The Auburn School District and the three-room school in Auburn closed, causing children to attend schools in Greeley beginning in 1961. During that year children were assigned to Delta Elementary School, Meeker Junior High School, and Greeley High School. The Auburn and Delta schools no longer exist.

== See also ==
- Front Range Urban Corridor
- Greeley, CO Metropolitan Statistical Area
- List of populated places in Colorado
