= Quebec train crash =

Quebec train crash may refer to:

- St-Hilaire train disaster, 1864 — train fell through bridge into river
- Dorion level crossing accident, 1966 — school bus hit by freight train
- Lac-Mégantic derailment, 2013 —runaway oil train exploded
