= Brentwood Middle School =

Brentwood Middle School may refer to:

- Brentwood Middle School (Greeley, Colorado)
- Brentwood Middle School (Brentwood, Missouri)
- Brentwood Middle School (Brentwood, Tennessee)
