= Görel Hanser =

Swedish music and artist manager (1949–2026)

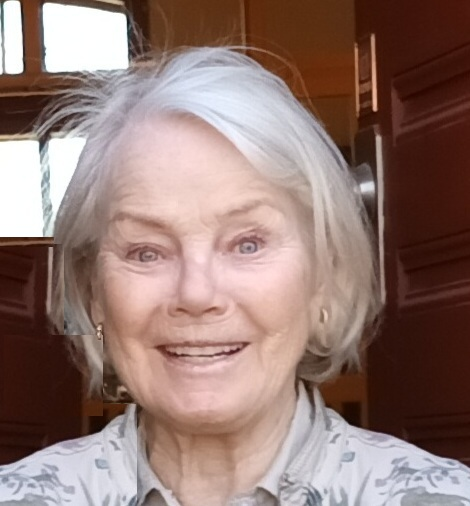
- Gorel in April 2026
- Born: Görel Kristina Johnsen; 21 June 1949; Skövde, Sweden
- Died: 12 June 2026 (aged 76)
- Occupation: Music and artist management
- Years active: 1969–2026
- Employer(s): Polar Music, Sweden Music
- Organization(s): Music & Artist Service Görel Hanser AB
- Known for: Management of ABBA
- Spouse: Anders Hanser (m. 1980)
- Children: 2
- Awards: Grammis (2018)

Görel Kristina Hanser (née Johnsen; 21 June 1949 – 12 June 2026) was a Swedish music and artist manager. She was the manager of the Swedish pop group ABBA and its group members. She also served as Vice President of Polar Music and was secretary to Stig Anderson.

== Background ==
Görel Kristina Johnsen was born on 21 June 1949 in Skultorp, near Skövde in Sweden. In 1980, she married journalist and photographer Anders Hanser, whom she met while he was covering ABBA for a radio series.

Hanser died on 13 June 2026, at the age of 76. Her death was announced jointly by ABBA group members Agnetha Fältskog, Björn Ulvaeus, Benny Andersson and Anni-Frid Lyngstad.

== Career ==
Hanser started working at the offices of Stig Anderson’s publishing company Sweden Music and the record company Polar Music in September 1969.

She subsequently became Anderson's secretary. A few years into the 1970s she had become a key figure in the organisation and became Vice President of Polar Music.

During the ABBA years, she handled the contacts with the many labels around the world who released the group's records. She also became ABBA's personal manager, dealing with the press and accompanying them on their tours and promotional trips. In the process, she became a personal friend of the individual members. In 1979, ABBA wrote and recorded "Sång Till Görel" together with Stig "Stikkan" Anderson and was gifted to Görel at her 30th birthday. A 12" record in blue vinyl was pressed in only 50 copies (though some sources say it could be up to 150) and was given to Görel and friends. The lyric, sung in Swedish, is a humorous take on how everyone needs Görel at the office. The record is one of the most sought after ABBA records ever – fetching several thousand dollars at auctions.

After ABBA’s break-up, Hanser continued working for Sweden Music and Polar for a few years. In 1987, she started her own company Music & Artist Service Görel Hanser. She and her staff were mainly occupied with handling the practical details concerning Benny Andersson’s work, including the Andersson/Ulvaeus musicals. She also handled matters concerning ABBA-related business on behalf of Björn Ulvaeus and Andersson. In April 2011, she represented ABBA at the 25th anniversary of the Official International ABBA Fan Club in Roosendaal, the Netherlands.

In 2018, Hanser was awarded a Grammis.
