= Tad Boyle =

American basketball coach (born 1963)

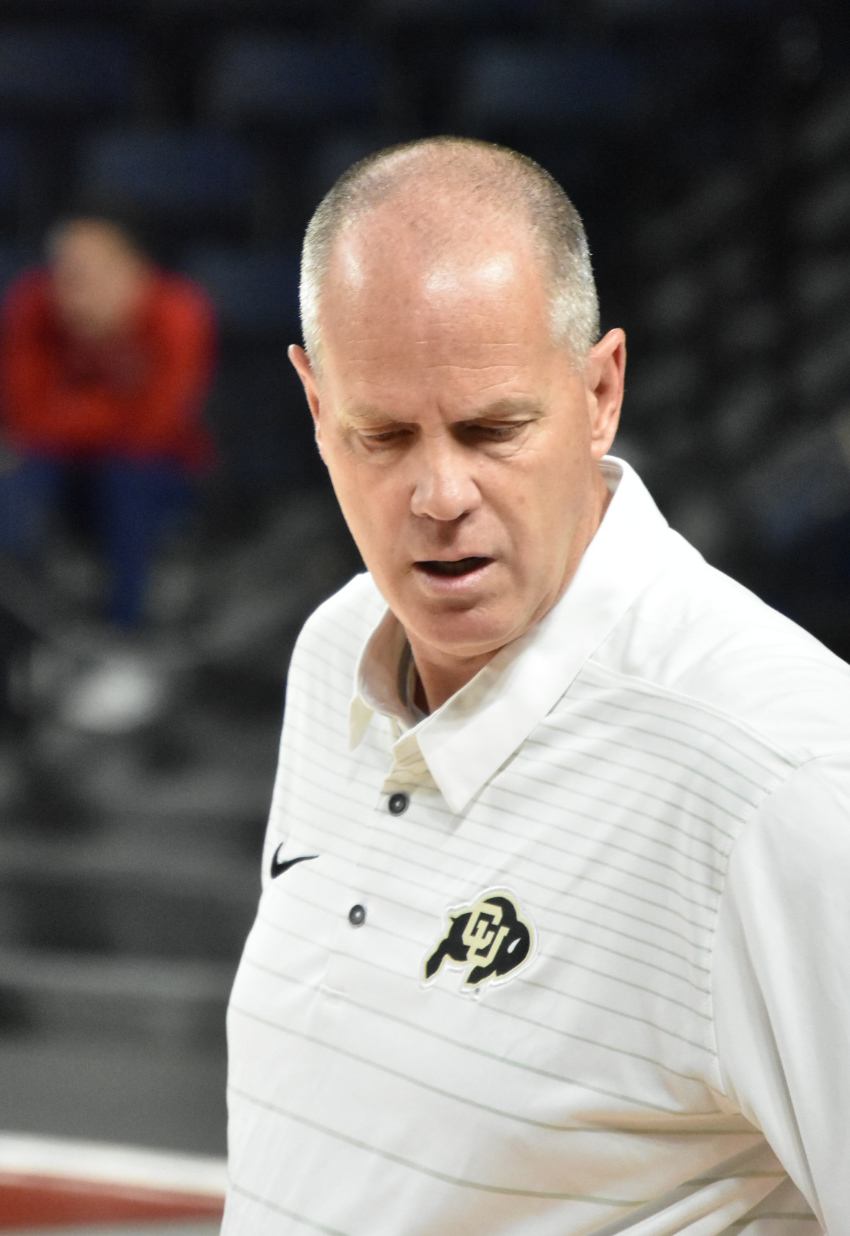
- Boyle in 2017

Current position
- Title: Head coach
- Team: Colorado
- Conference: Big 12
- Record: 331–220 (.601)

Biographical details
- Born: January 6, 1963 (age 63); Greeley, Colorado, U.S.

Playing career
- 1981–1985: Kansas

Coaching career (HC unless noted)
- 1988–1989: Greeley West HS (sophomores)
- 1989–1991: Loveland HS (assistant)
- 1991–1994: Longmont HS
- 1994–1997: Oregon (assistant)
- 1997–1998: Tennessee (assistant)
- 1998–2000: Jacksonville State (assistant)
- 2000–2006: Wichita State (assistant)
- 2006–2010: Northern Colorado
- 2010–present: Colorado

Head coaching record
- Overall: 387–286 (.575) (college)
- Tournaments: 4–6 (NCAA Division I); 6–5 (NIT); 1–1 (CIT); 1–1 (CBI); 0–2 (CBC)

Accomplishments and honors

Championships
- Pac-12 tournament (2012)

Thomas Martin "Tad" Boyle (born January 6, 1963) is an American college basketball coach who is the men's head coach of the Colorado Buffaloes of the Big 12 Conference. He was named the 18th coach in Colorado men's basketball history on April 19, 2010, replacing Jeff Bzdelik. Boyle was named as an assistant coach for USA Basketball a second time in 2015. He played collegiately at Kansas under coach Ted Owens and Hall of Fame coach Larry Brown.

While playing guard for the Jayhawks, the 6'4" Boyle played on NCAA tournament teams in 1984 and 1985. He served as team captain his senior year, which was 1988 NBA draft choice Danny Manning's freshman season and Mark Turgeon's sophomore season.

Before heading to Kansas, Boyle was a standout performer at Greeley Central High School. He led the Wildcats to a state championship as a senior in 1981 and earned Colorado Player of the Year honors, as well as being selected to the Converse All-American team. His high school jersey was retired at the conclusion of his senior season.

== Playing career ==
Boyle played collegiately for legendary coaches Ted Owens and Larry Brown at Kansas (1981–85). He was a member of two NCAA Tournament teams (1984, 1985) and was part of the 1984 Big Eight tournament championship squad. As a senior, Boyle captained the Jayhawks, which featured freshman Danny Manning, who three years later led the Jayhawks to the NCAA Championship.

== Coaching career ==
=== Early days ===
After earning a bachelor of science degree in business administration from Kansas in 1985, he became a commodities broker in Kansas City. In 1986 he returned to Colorado and continued his career as a commodities broker. He also got back into basketball and went on to serve for six years as a high school basketball coach at various Colorado programs. He was the sophomore basketball coach at Greeley West High School for a year and then was an assistant coach at Loveland High School for two years. From there, he served at Longmont High School for three years.

A car accident in 1994 changed Boyle's career forever. Boyle was heading to work one morning when somebody ran a red light and plowed into his vehicle at the intersection of McCaslin Boulevard and South Boulder Road in Louisville, Colorado. The collision crushed the front of Boyle's car. He was knocked unconscious, but the air bag likely saved his life. At that point, Boyle was earning six figures as a stockbroker and considered his "other" job, as head coach at Longmont High, to be little more than a hobby. Later that year, Boyle received a phone call from his former University of Kansas teammate, Mark Turgeon, then an assistant at Oregon. Turgeon stated that there was an opening on Oregon's staff, but it was a restricted earnings position that paid $16,000 a year. Boyle, not married at the time, decided to take the plunge into a full-time coaching gig.

== Other jobs ==
After his first year at CU, Boyle received interest for the head coaching position at Texas A&M vacated by his old friend Mark Turgeon, after Turgeon left to be the head coach at Maryland. Boyle rebuffed this interest and stayed at his "dream job" at CU.

Following his second season at CU, Boyle continued to draw interest from other programs, and his name was linked with the Nebraska and Kansas State openings, although he once again denied interest in both jobs, stating "I want to do something special here at Colorado. I don’t have any interest in other jobs. I would love it if CU were my last job."

== Fan following ==
Under Boyle's leadership, there have been several sell-outs for CU games at Coors Event Center and increased season ticket sales. Several thousand fans also made the trip to Albuquerque for CU-UNLV and CU-Baylor NCAA tournament games. Colorado Athletic Director Mike Bohn responded to increased student interest by flying 50 students, all expenses paid, to Los Angeles for the Pac-12 tournament and taking 100 students to the NCAA tournament games in Albuquerque. After the success of the C-Unit OG 50, Colorado Athletic Director Mike Bohn repeated the trip the following year by taking another group of 50 students on an all-expense-paid trip to Las Vegas for the 2013 Pac-12 tournament. However, the Buffaloes were unable to repeat as champions as they lost in the second round to the eventual runner-up Arizona Wildcats.

== Personal life ==
Boyle is married to the former Ann Schell of Greeley, and they have two sons, Jack and Pete, and a daughter, Claire.

== Head coaching record ==
Record table
Season	Team	Overall	Conference	Standing	Postseason
Northern Colorado Bears (Big Sky Conference) (2006–2010)
2006–07	Northern Colorado	4–24	2–14	9th	
2007–08	Northern Colorado	13–16	6–10	T–7th	
2008–09	Northern Colorado	14–18	8–8	5th	
2009–10	Northern Colorado	25–8	12–4	2nd	CIT quarterfinal
Northern Colorado:		56–66 (.459)	28–36 (.438)		
Colorado Buffaloes (Big 12 Conference) (2010–2011)
2010–11	Colorado	24–14	8–8	T–5th	NIT semifinal
Colorado Buffaloes (Pac-12 Conference) (2011–2024)
2011–12	Colorado	24–12	11–7	T–5th	NCAA Division I Round of 32
2012–13	Colorado	21–12	10–8	5th	NCAA Division I Round of 64
2013–14	Colorado	23–12	10–8	T–3rd	NCAA Division I Round of 64
2014–15	Colorado	16–18	7–11	T–8th	CBI quarterfinal
2015–16	Colorado	22–12	10–8	5th	NCAA Division I Round of 64
2016–17	Colorado	19–15	8–10	7th	NIT first round
2017–18	Colorado	17–15	8–10	T–8th	
2018–19	Colorado	23–13	10–8	5th	NIT quarterfinal
2019–20	Colorado	21–11	10–8	T–5th	NCAA Division I Canceled
2020–21	Colorado	23–9	14–6	3rd	NCAA Division I Round of 32
2021–22	Colorado	21–12	12–8	4th	NIT first round
2022–23	Colorado	18–17	8–12	T–8th	NIT second round
2023–24	Colorado	26–11	13–7	3rd	NCAA Division I Round of 32
Colorado Buffaloes (Big 12 Conference) (2024–present)
2024–25	Colorado	14–21	3–17	16th	CBC First Round
2025–26	Colorado	17–16	7–11	T–11th	CBC Quarterfinals
2026–27	Colorado	2–3	0–0		
Colorado:		331–220 (.601)	149–147 (.503)		
Total:		387–286 (.575)			
National champion Postseason invitational champion Conference regular season champion Conference regular season and conference tournament champion Division regular season champion Division regular season and conference tournament champion Conference tournament champion
