= Evans, Colorado =

Home rule city in Weld County, Colorado, United States

- Home rule city
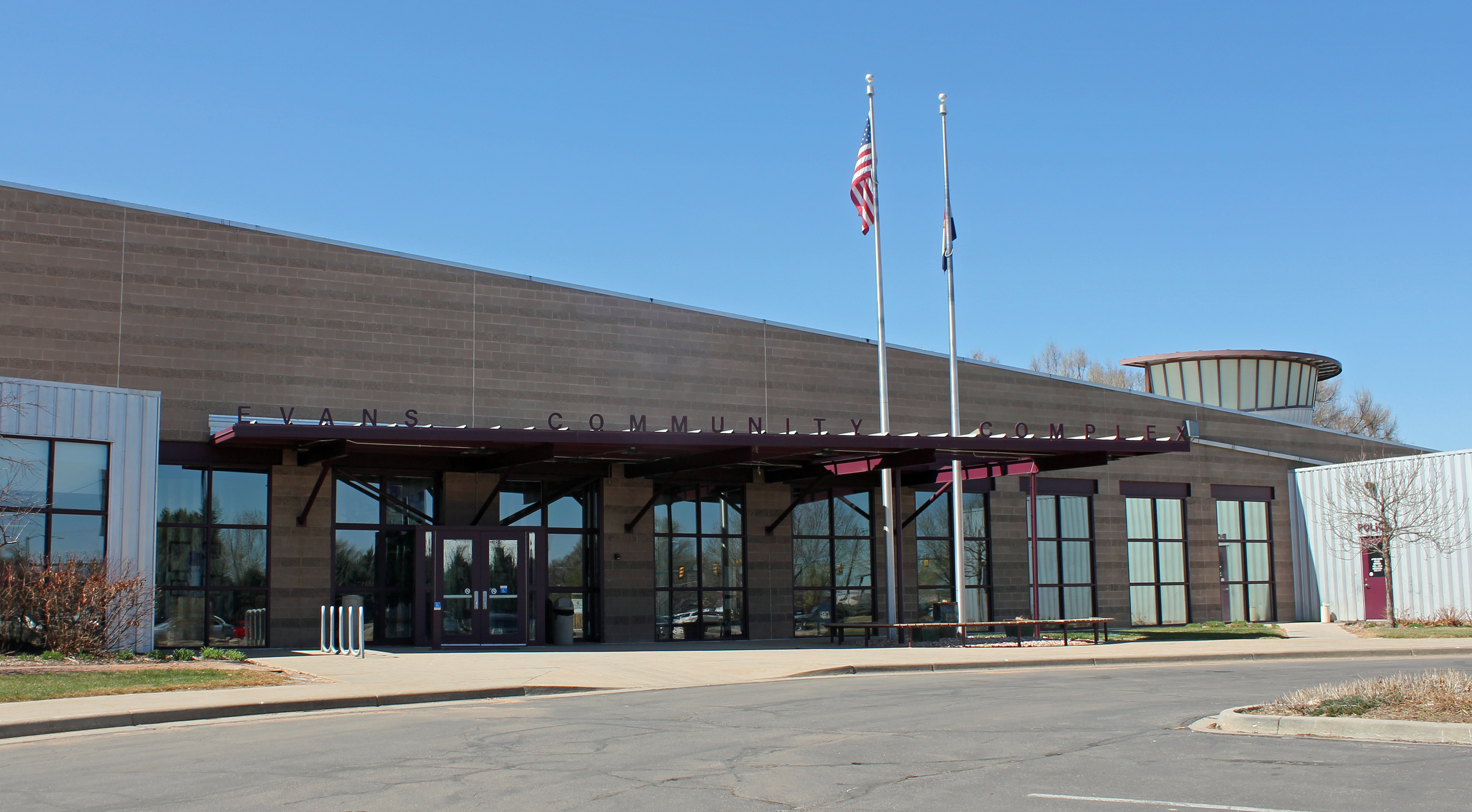
- The Evans Community Complex.

- Location of the City of Evans in Weld County, Colorado
- Coordinates: 40°21′39″N 104°43′30″W
- Country: United States
- State: Colorado
- County: Weld
- Founded: 1867
- Incorporated: November 15, 1885

Government
  - Type: home rule city
  - Mayor: Mark Clark
  - City Manager: Cody Sims

Area
  - Total: 10.526 sq mi (27.263 km^{2})
  - Land: 10.182 sq mi (26.372 km^{2})
  - Water: 0.344 sq mi (0.891 km^{2})
- Elevation: 4,682 ft (1,427 m)

Population (2020)
  - Total: 22,165
  - Density: 2,177/sq mi (841/km^{2})
- Time zone: UTC−07:00 (MST)
  - Summer (DST): UTC−06:00 (MDT)
- ZIP code: 80620
- Area codes: 970/748
- GNIS town ID: 2410467
- FIPS code: 08-25280
- Website: www.evanscolorado.gov

The City of Evans is a home rule city located in Weld County, Colorado, United States. The city population was 22,165 at the 2020 United States census, a 19.57% increase since the 2010 United States census. Evans is a part of the Greeley, CO Metropolitan Statistical Area and the Front Range Urban Corridor.

== History ==
The city was named for the second Territorial Governor of Colorado, John Evans, The town was settled in 1867, and the Evans, Colorado Territory, post office opened on May 16, 1870. Evans served as the Weld County seat from 1870 until 1874, and again from 1875 until 1877 when Greeley finally captured the honor. Legend in Evans is that the county records were stolen by night-riders from Greeley, who also burned the courthouse down with the county seat documents. The Town of Evans was incorporated on November 15, 1885.

Today, Evans, like other towns in Colorado along the South Platte River, is home to a rapidly growing Hispanic population. Evans has several primary commercial areas located along US 85 just south of its junction with US 34, as well along 23rd Avenue and on 37th Street with new commercial areas developing as the city expands to the west and south of the South Platte River.

== Geography ==
At the 2020 United States census, the town had a total area of 6,737 acres (27.263 km^{2}) including 220 acres (0.891 km^{2}) of water.

== Demographics ==
Historical population
Census	Pop.	Note	%±
1870	189		—
1880	542		186.8%
1890	306		−43.5%
1900	400		30.7%
1910	600		50.0%
1920	505		−15.8%
1930	540		6.9%
1940	792		46.7%
1950	862		8.8%
1960	1,453		68.6%
1970	2,570		76.9%
1980	5,063		97.0%
1990	5,877		16.1%
2000	9,514		61.9%
2010	18,537		94.8%
2020	22,165		19.6%
2024 (est.)	22,394	▲	1.0%
U.S. Decennial Census

=== 2020 census ===
As of the 2020 census, Evans had a population of 22,165. The median age was 30.3 years. 27.8% of residents were under the age of 18 and 9.0% of residents were 65 years of age or older. For every 100 females there were 101.6 males, and for every 100 females age 18 and over there were 100.9 males age 18 and over.

99.6% of residents lived in urban areas, while 0.4% lived in rural areas.

There were 7,758 households in Evans, of which 39.7% had children under the age of 18 living in them. Of all households, 46.8% were married-couple households, 21.0% were households with a male householder and no spouse or partner present, and 24.2% were households with a female householder and no spouse or partner present. About 24.1% of all households were made up of individuals and 6.3% had someone living alone who was 65 years of age or older.

There were 8,041 housing units, of which 3.5% were vacant. The homeowner vacancy rate was 1.1% and the rental vacancy rate was 5.2%.

Racial composition as of the 2020 census
Race	Number	Percent
White	12,723	57.4%
Black or African American	409	1.8%
American Indian and Alaska Native	395	1.8%
Asian	498	2.2%
Native Hawaiian and Other Pacific Islander	57	0.3%
Some other race	4,322	19.5%
Two or more races	3,761	17.0%
Hispanic or Latino (of any race)	10,307	46.5%

=== 2000 census ===
As of the 2000 census, there were 9,514 people, 3,277 households, and 2,359 families living in the city. The population density was 2,489.9 inhabitants per square mile (961.4/km^{2}). There were 3,404 housing units at an average density of 890.9 units per square mile (344.0 units/km^{2}). The racial makeup of the city was 71.08% White, 0.79% African American, 1.28% Native American, 0.71% Asian, 0.02% Pacific Islander, 22.45% from other races, and 3.66% from two or more races. Hispanic or Latino of any race were 40.08% of the population.

There were 3,277 households, out of which 43.8% had children under the age of 18 living with them, 51.3% were married couples living together, 14.3% had a female householder with no husband present, and 28.0% were non-families. 19.3% of all households were made up of individuals, and 6.0% had someone living alone who was 65 years of age or older. The average household size was 2.90 and the average family size was 3.33.

In the city, the population was spread out, with 32.1% under the age of 18, 14.2% from 18 to 24, 32.3% from 25 to 44, 15.2% from 45 to 64, and 6.2% who were 65 years of age or older. The median age was 27 years. For every 100 females, there were 98.2 males. For every 100 females age 18 and over, there were 93.9 males.

The median income for a household in the city was $37,158, and the median income for a family was $42,983. Males had a median income of $30,938 versus $22,946 for females. The per capita income for the city was $15,329. About 9.8% of families and 14.9% of the population were below the poverty line, including 19.6% of those under age 18 and 6.4% of those age 65 or over.

== Education ==
Evans is within Weld County School District Six. As of 2008 zoned elementary schools serving sections of Evans include Centennial, Dos Rios, and Heiman in Evans and Bella Romero Elementary School in an unincorporated section of Weld County. Middle school-aged students are zoned to Brentwood Middle School in Greeley, while high school students are zoned to Greeley West High School in Greeley.

== See also ==
- Front Range Urban Corridor
