= Northridge High School (Colorado) =

Location
- 100 71st Avenue; Greeley, Colorado 80634; United States
- 40°26′0″N 104°47′26″W

Information
- School type: Public high school
- School district: Greeley-Evans 6
- CEEB code: 060711
- NCES School ID: 080441001788
- Principal: Insoon Olson
- Teaching staff: 66.83 (on an FTE basis)
- Grades: 9–12
- Enrollment: 1,346 (2023–2024)
- Student to teacher ratio: 20.14
- Colors: Cardinal, navy, silver
- Athletics conference: CHSAA
- Mascot: Grizzly
- Website: www.greeleyschools.org/northridge

Northridge High School is located in Greeley, Colorado, United States. It is a part of Weld County School District 6. Northridge was established in 2000.
