= Dorion train-bus collision =

1966 railway incident in Quebec, Canada

Coordinates: 45.38606°N 74.0105°W

Dorion level crossing accident

Details
- Date: Evening of October 7, 1966
- Location: Dorion, Quebec

Statistics
- Vehicles: School bus, CN Rail freight train
- Passengers: 42
- Deaths: 21 (including the driver)
- Injured: 21

The Dorion level crossing accident occurred on October 7, 1966, when a school bus carrying 42 students was struck by a CN Rail freight train travelling at full speed in Dorion, Quebec, Canada (now a part of Vaudreuil-Dorion).

== Summary ==
On the evening of October 7, at about 7:35 p.m., approximately 40 students from Cité-des-Jeunes high school were travelling by school bus to a dance in Hudson, Quebec, when the bus reached a level crossing. At the time of the incident, the bus was being driven by 22-year-old Marcel Fleury, of Dorion. The gates lowered, preventing the school bus from crossing and allowing an eastbound train to continue its route. After the train had passed, the gates rose, allowing the school bus to cross. As the bus began to drive over the level crossing, an unseen second train (with 101 cars in tow) headed westbound, struck the bus and split it in half, dragging one half with it for over 610 metres (2,000 ft). The other half of the bus was found in a ditch approximately 91 metres (300 ft) from the crossing. This incident was the worst disaster in the Montreal area since the LaSalle Heights disaster killed 28 people the year previous.

Of the 41 people aboard, 19 were killed instantly, including the bus driver, with the deceased ranging in age from 12 to 20 years old. Many of the injured were taken to the Lakeshore General Hospital in Pointe-Claire. One young man subsequently died of his injuries. Another victim, Nicole Bélanger, never fully recovered, and her death in 1998 was attributed to the accident. No injuries were reported on the train. The funerals were held on October 11 at Cité-des-Jeunes high school.

== Investigation ==
After the accident there was much speculation as to its cause. Hypotheses included malfunctioning crossing gates, and that a number of students lifted the gate to clear the bus's path. After years of investigation the coroner released a statement declaring accidental death with no criminality, and the investigation was closed soon thereafter. The coroner's report concluded the crossing gates were not defective and that eyewitness testimony proved that two or more students lifted the gates despite the possibility of another oncoming train.

== Aftermath ==
Immediately after the disaster Queen Elizabeth II sent her sympathies for the victims to Governor General Georges Vanier.

After receiving numerous complaints, requests to reopen the investigation and public demonstrations of disagreement by the citizens of the city of Dorion, the level crossing was replaced by a double underpass by direction of Paul Gérin-Lajoie during November 1972.

In 1999 a commemorative plaque was unveiled in Vaudreuil-Dorion with the names of the 21 victims inscribed. Included in the victim count was Nicole Bélanger. Some survivors gather each year at the plaque and accident site each year to honour the victims, and gathered at the Trinity Church in Dorion to commemorate the 50th anniversary of the accident.

On October 7, 2006, Francine Tougas displayed her documentary entitled Survivre at the Cité-des-Jeunes high school. Survivre documents the reaction to the Dorion level crossing accident by the government, CN Rail, citizens of the city of Dorion, the families of the 19 students killed, and the families of the surviving students.

== See also ==
- List of rail accidents in Canada
- List of rail accidents (1960–1969)
- List of deadliest Canadian traffic accidents
