= Sudan rail collision =

1965 train collision in Sudan

1965 Sudan rail collision

Details
- Date: 26 February 1965
- Location: 100 kilometres north of Khartoum
- Country: Sudan
- Line: Khartoum–Wadi Halfa railway
- Cause: riding on same track in opposite direction

Statistics
- Trains: 2
- Passengers: 124 or more
- Deaths: 100-120
- Injured: 21 (severe)

On 26 February 1965 a passenger train collided head-on with a freight train 100 kilometres north of Khartoum, Sudan killing 100-120 people.

It was the deadliest railway accident in Sudan and it is one of the deadliest railway disasters on the African continent.

== The accident ==
Example of a 1960s Sudanese passenger train

The disaster happened on Friday 26 February 1965 around 100 kilometres north of Khartoum, in some media reported as "Abo", on the single-track Khartoum–Wadi Halfa railway. A freight train on the way to Port Sudan had a head-on collision with a passenger train coming from Port Sudan towards Khartoum driving in the opposite direction. The collision caused a major train wreck.

== Victims and rescue operation ==
Initial reports stated that 26 people had been killed with still around 50 people in the wreckage and another 21 people had been severely injured. It was very difficult to find people among the wreckage and debris. On 28 February, two days after the disaster, another six bodies were found in the debris. On the evening of 28 February it was assumed that all missing people still in the debris were dead. The rescue operation ended on 1 March with a reported total of 120 deaths. According to American sources there were 124 people on the train with at least 100 people that were killed.

== Investigation ==
An investigation was initiated into the cause of the disaster. The investigative committee stated that one of the speed indicators of one of the trains that was found among the debris indicated a speed of 90 km/h.
