= Greeley-Evans School District 6 =

School district in Greeley, Colorado

Address
- 1025 Ninth Avenue Greeley, Colorado, 80631; United States
- Coordinates: 40°25′17″N 104°41′35″W

District information
- Type: Unified school district
- Motto: I'm District 6.
- Grades: P–12
- Superintendent: Deidre Pilch
- School board: 7 members
- Chair of the board: Natalie Mash
- Schools: 34
- Budget: $350,668,000
- NCES District ID: 0804410

Students and staff
- Students: 22,505
- Teachers: 1,271.60 (on an FTE basis)
- Staff: 2,757.62 (on an FTE basis)
- Student–teacher ratio: 17.70

Other information
- Website: www.greeleyschools.org

Greeley-Evans School District 6 is a school district headquartered in Greeley, Colorado, United States. The district serves most of the City of Greeley, the City of Evans, the Town of Garden City, and unincorporated areas in Weld County, including Auburn.

== Schools ==
The following schools are operated by or through Greeley-Evans School District 6:

=== High schools ===
==== Zoned schools ====
- Greeley Central High School (Greeley)
- Greeley West High School (Greeley)
- Northridge High School (Greeley)

==== Other high schools ====
- Greeley Alternative Program (Greeley)
- Jefferson High School (Greeley)
- Early College Academy (Greeley)

=== K-8 ===
The following schools teach kindergarten through eighth grade:

- Bella Romero Academy (Greeley, split into K-3 and 4–8)

Extraction Oil and Gas has been operating a fracking platform of 24 wells within 700 feet from the playground of the Bella Romero 4-8 Academy at 1400 East 20th Street east of the city limits of Greeley. The controversial business activity has also been featured in stories from The New York Times, Mother Jones, and others. In June 2020, a petition was submitted to shut down the fracking platform. Children and teachers were exposed to benzene levels from the fracking operations almost seven times higher than the lifetime safe exposure level for benzene by the World Health Organization.

- Chappellow K-8 Arts Magnet School (Evans)
- Fred Tjardes School of Innovation (Greeley)
- James Madison STEAM Academy (Greeley)
- S. Christa McAuliffe S.T.E.M. Academy (Greeley)
- Tointon Academy of Pre-Engineering (Greeley)
- Winograd K-8 (Greeley)

=== Middle schools ===
==== Zoned schools ====
- Brentwood Middle School (Greeley)
- Franklin Middle School (Greeley)
- Heath Middle School (Greeley)
- Prairie Heights Middle School (Greeley)

==== Other middle schools ====
- Jefferson Junior High School (Greeley)

=== Elementary schools ===
- Centennial Elementary (Evans)
- Dos Rios Elementary (Evans)
- Heiman Elementary (Evans)
- Jackson Elementary (Greeley)
- Maplewood Elementary (Greeley)
- Martinez Elementary (Greeley)
- Meeker Elementary School (Greeley)
- Monfort Elementary School (Greeley)
- Scott Elementary (Greeley)
- Shawsheen Elementary (Greeley)

=== Preschool sites ===
The school district operates preschools in Martinez, Scott, and Shawsheen elementary schools. Additionally, it has the following sites:

- Early Childhood University (Greeley)
- ABC East (Greeley)
- District 6 Early Childhood Preschool, Aims Campus (Greeley)

=== Affiliated charter schools ===
- Frontier Academy (Greeley, K-5, 6–12)
- Salida Del Sol Academy (Greeley, K-8)
- Union Colony Elementary (Greeley, K-5)
- Union Colony Preparatory (Greeley, 6–12)
- University Schools (Greeley, K-5, 6–8, 9–12)
- West Ridge Academy (Greeley, K-8)

=== Former Schools ===
- John Evans Middle School (Greeley, closed and students transferred to Prairie Heights Middle School in 2015)
- East Memorial Elementary School (Greeley, now Bella Romero Academy's K-3 building)
