= Skultorp =

- Location within Västra Götaland Location within Sweden
- Coordinates: 58°21′N 13°50′E
- Country: Sweden
- Province: Västergötland
- County: Västra Götaland County
- Municipality: Skövde Municipality

Area
  - Total: 2.69 km^{2} (1.04 sq mi)

Population (31 December 2010)
  - Total: 3,642
  - Density: 1,354/km^{2} (3,510/sq mi)
- Time zone: UTC+1 (CET)
  - Summer (DST): UTC+2 (CEST)

Skultorp (Swedish pronunciation: [ˈskɵ̌lːtɔrp]) is a locality situated in Skövde Municipality, Västra Götaland County, Sweden with 3,642 inhabitants in 2010.

On February 20, 1965, a major train accident in Skultorp claimed 10 lives. A passenger train ran into another non-moving passenger train.

It is home to Billingsdalsskolan, a prominent elementary school in the region.
