= Greeley Central High School =

Public high school in Greeley, Colorado

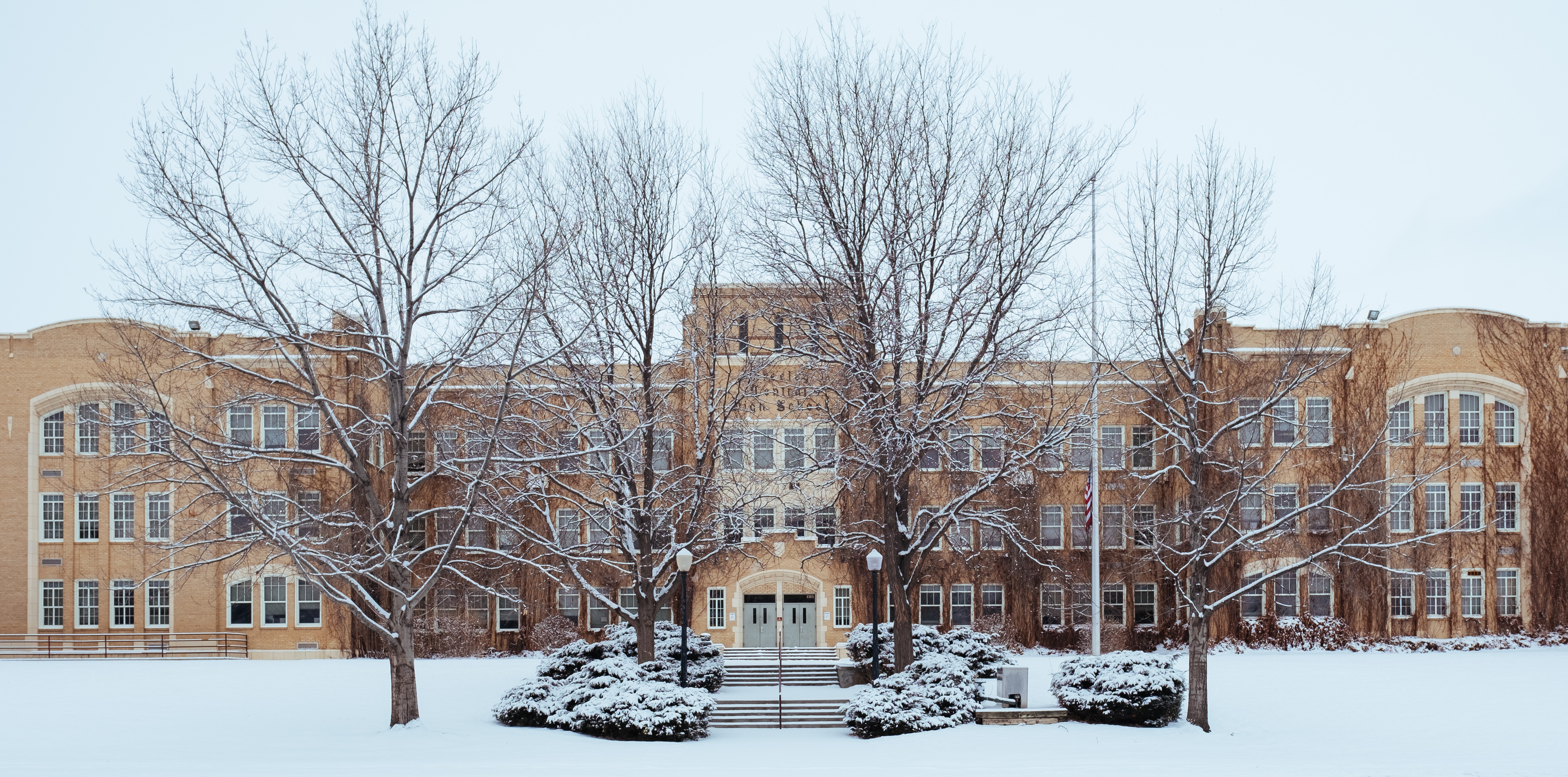
- Front of the school in 2018

Location
- 1514 14th Avenue; Greeley, Colorado 80631; United States; 40°24′53″N 104°42′11″W

Information
- Former name: Greeley High School
- School type: Public high school
- School district: Greeley-Evans 6
- CEEB code: 060710
- NCES School ID: 080441000641
- Principal: Amy Zulauf
- Teaching staff: 77.85 (on an FTE basis)
- Grades: 9–12
- Enrollment: 1,493 (2023–2024)
- Student to teacher ratio: 19.18
- Colors: Orange and black
- Athletics conference: CHSAA
- Mascot: Wildcat
- Website: www.greeleyschools.org/greeleycentral
- Greeley Central High School
- U.S. National Register of Historic Places
- NRHP reference No.: 99000444
- Added to NRHP: April 15, 1999

Greeley Central High School is the oldest of three public high schools in Greeley, Colorado, United States in Greeley-Evans School District 6. It was founded in 1880 as Greeley High School

== History ==
Formerly known as Greeley High, Greeley Central High School had its start in the late 1800s. The school's current building was completed in 1927 at a cost of $350,000. It is the fourth structure to be known as Greeley High School. At the time, 14th Avenue was at the far western edge of the city, and this site was across the street from what had been a city dump. Local Architect Sidney G. Frazier designed the school to resemble a French chateau. It is considered an example of late Gothic Revival. Extensive remodels in 1958, 1974, 1994, and 2000 dramatically changed the interior and the campus, but the front remained virtually the same and has become known as "The Castle". The school building was listed on the National Register of Historic Places in 1999.

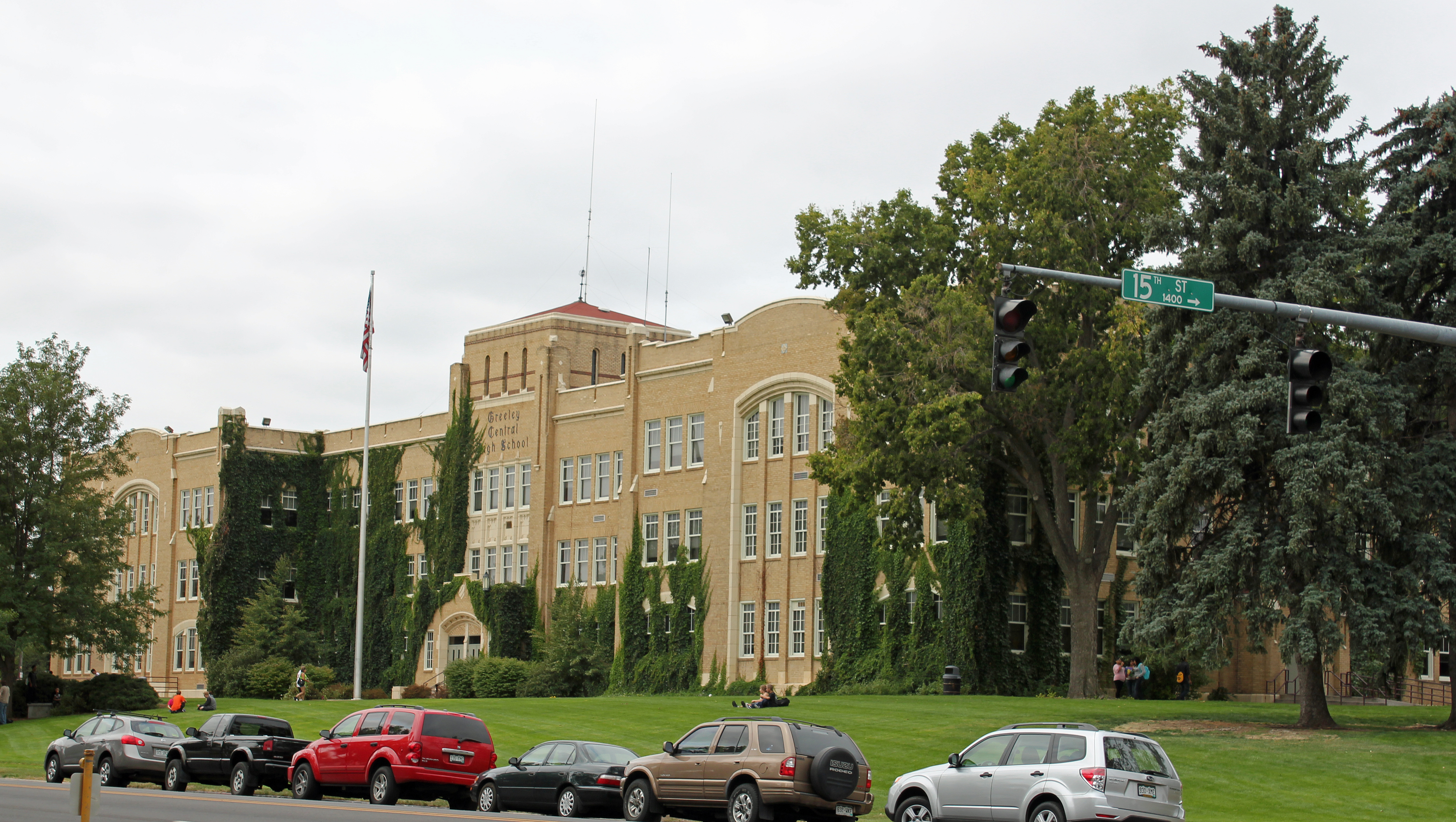
Front of the school in August, 2012

The name of the school was changed in 1965 to Greeley Central, under the leadership of principals Paul S. Gillespie, Robert S. Gilcrest, Wendell T. Blight, Wendell K. Beard, Henry C. Jensen, Wendell Wilson, Robert W. Turner, Franklin H. Bressler, Rex W. Hester, Cloyd MacBernd, John Lepetit, John "JC" Christensen, Jon Helwick and Mary Lauer.

In honor of the school's mascot, 14th Avenue in front of the school was renamed "Wildcat Way" in a 2004 ceremony by city, school and student leaders.

== Notable alumni ==
- Tad Boyle, men's basketball coach at University of Colorado
- Joanna Cameron, actress, star of The Secrets of Isis
- Michael Shellenberger, environmentalist and politician
