= Greeley bus disaster =

Grade crossing collision in Greeley, Colorado

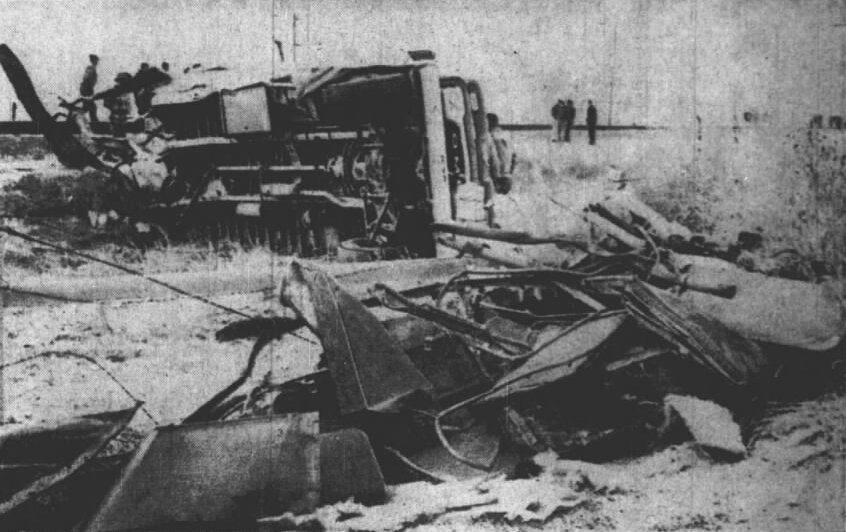

Details
- Date: December 14, 1961; 7:59 am
- Location: Greeley, Colorado
- Coordinates: 40°21′47″N 104°39′14″W
- Country: United States
- Operator: Union Pacific
- Incident type: Collision with vehicle on rail
- Cause: Lack of crossing signals; poor visibility at crossing

Statistics
- Trains: 1
- Vehicles: 1
- Deaths: 20
- Injured: 17

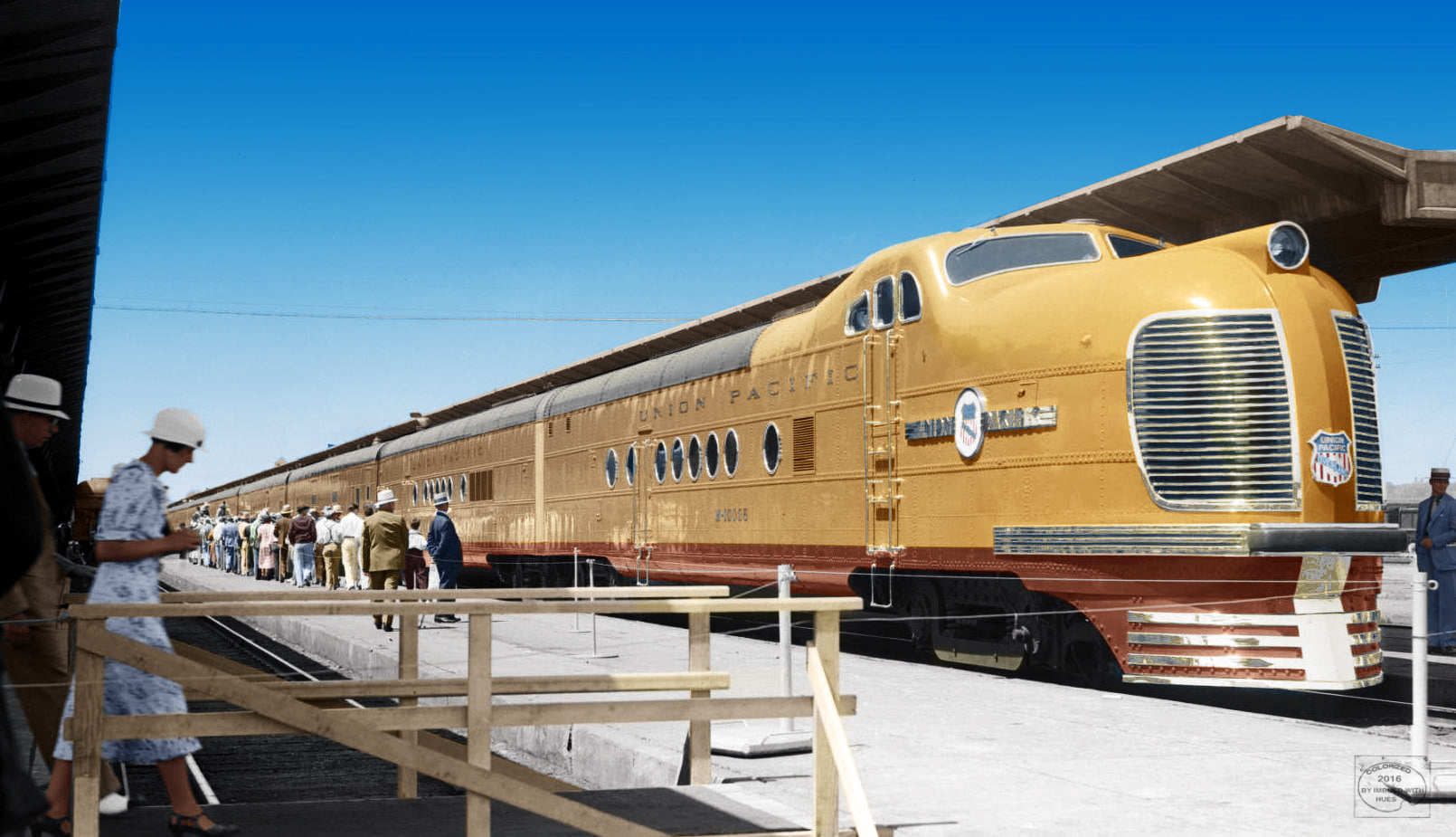
A train similar to that of the one that was involved.

The Greeley bus disaster refers to a collision between a train and a school bus in 1961 that resulted in the deaths of 20 passengers, with an additional 17 injuries. It was the deadliest traffic accident in the history of Colorado.

== Background ==
On December 14, 1961, bus driver, Duane Harms, was completing his route. Besides Harms, the bus also was carrying an additional 36 students on their way to school. Harms was 23 years old at the time of the incident.

Around this same time, a Union Pacific streamliner, The City of Denver, was running 10 minutes behind schedule. As it neared Greeley, Colorado, the train was traveling around 70 miles per hour.

Between 7:45 am and 8:00 am, the train and the bus reached a diagonal crossing at the same time in a rural part of the city. The area did not have proper signals or gates. These crossings were referred to as "passive crossings".

== Collision ==
At around 7:59 am, the bus approached the diagonal crossing. Harms, not seeing the Streamliner approaching, continued through the crossing. The Streamliner impacted the rear of the bus at around 80 mph, splitting the bus in half and throwing it in the air. In all, 20 students were killed, the youngest being 6 years old, and the oldest being 14. Harms suffered relatively minor injuries.

== Cause ==
Initial blame was placed on the bus driver for his failure to see the approaching train. While Harms was initially indicted, it would ultimately be determined that the intersection of the crossing (a 30 degree angle), greatly obstructed visibility for any driver approaching from the same position.

== Aftermath ==
The site of the crossing was soon removed. A cement marker now stands near the location of the disaster.
