= Greeley West High School =

Location
- 2401 35th Avenue; Greeley, Colorado 80634; United States; 40°24′05″N 104°44′11″W

Information
- Type: Public
- Established: 1966 (60 years ago)
- School district: Weld County School District Six
- CEEB code: 060712
- Principal: Jeff Cranson
- Teaching staff: 92.64 (FTE)
- Grades: 9-12
- Enrollment: 1,987 (2023-2024)
- Student to teacher ratio: 21.45
- Colors: Navy, Columbia blue, gold
- Mascot: Spartans
- Website: www.greeleyschools.org/greeleywest

Greeley West High School is a public high school located in Greeley, Colorado, at the intersection of 35th Avenue and West 24th Street. The school was established in 1966 and had an enrollment of 1,450 students in the 2003–04 school year. Its mascot is the Spartans.

== History and academics ==
Opened on January 25, 1965, Greeley West High School and featured a distinctive hexagonal shape shared by John Evans Middle School, which opened the same day. The cost to build the 113,470-square-foot high school was $2 million and the school opened with an enrollment of 785.

In 1996, it became the only school in Greeley to offer the International Baccalaureate Program. In 1998, Greeley West offered a program called Extended Learning Opportunity, which pushed back the school's regular starting time 90 minutes to allow students who wished to come in earlier to participate in small study classes.

In 2000, principal Erik Fredell was named a principal of the year by the National Association of Secondary School Principals and MetLife.

In 2016, two administrators were implicated in a scandal involving parent surveys. Principal Shelli Robins and Assistant Principal John Diebold were accused by a whistle-blower of creating fraudulent parent survey responses and submitting them to school district officials for over two years. The school district's internal investigation concluded that the accusations were true and that the pair additionally had ordered school staff to participate in the fraud. The district administrators accepted the resignations of Robins and Diebold and reformed the administration process of parent surveys.

On November 5, 2019, voters in Greeley and Evans approved a $395 million bond issue to improve school facilities throughout the District, including a replacement school for Greeley West. Ground breaking for the $120 million site began in August 2020. The building opened to students in the fall of 2022.

== Enrollment ==
According to the Colorado Department of Education, Greeley West has 1666 enrolled students (as of the 2019–20 school year).

== Athletics ==
Greeley West offers golf, football, volleyball, boys' and girls' soccer, boys' and girls' basketball, cheerleading, poms, baseball, softball, cross country, track and field, wrestling, boys' and girls' tennis, and boys' and girls' swimming.

The school has won state championships in baseball (1975), girls' soccer (2003, 2004), and four state titles in girls' tennis, most recently in 2003.

The school has also won state titles in boys' cross country (1965, 2009), girls' cross country (2007), and 5A Poms/Jazz (2000, 2007).

The boys' swim team at Greeley West was named state 4A Academic Team champion in 2007, and the boys' basketball team in 2010.

The Greeley West boys' swim team was named the class 4A State Champions in 2019.

== Notable alumni ==
- Shane Carwin, mixed martial artist, former Interim Heavyweight Champion of the UFC.
- Keith English, former NFL player.
- Taryn Hemmings, professional soccer player for the Boston Breakers.
- Mike Higgins, NBA basketball player.
- Ryan Martinez, wrestler and professional mixed martial artist.
- Dick and Charlie Monfort, owners of the Colorado Rockies.
- Tom Runnells, former MLB player, manager.
- Ron Waterman, Team Impact member, former pro wrestler.
