= Medicine Park, Oklahoma =

Town in Oklahoma, US

- Town
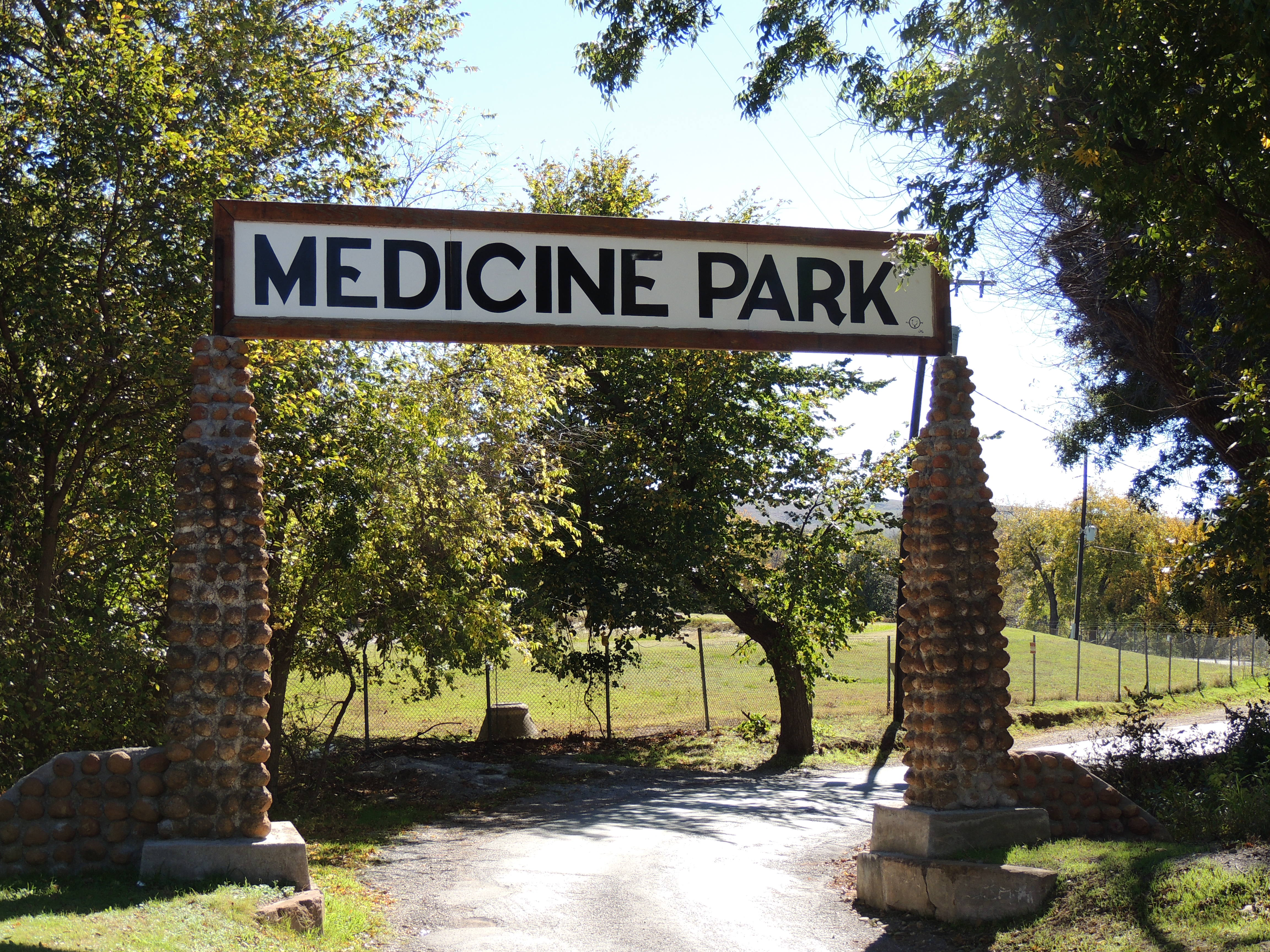
- Medicine Park cobblestone archway ... cobblestone archways garnished the Wichita Mountains landscape in the mid-twentieth century
- Nickname: "America's First Cobblestone Community"
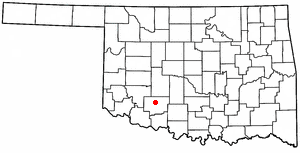
- Location of Medicine Park, Oklahoma
- Coordinates: 34°43′27″N 98°27′11″W
- Country: United States
- State: Oklahoma
- County: Comanche
- Founded: July 4, 1908; 118 years ago

Area
  - Total: 2.26 sq mi (5.86 km^{2})
  - Land: 2.21 sq mi (5.73 km^{2})
  - Water: 0.050 sq mi (0.13 km^{2})
- Elevation: 1,276 ft (389 m)

Population (2020)
  - Total: 411
  - Density: 185.9/sq mi (71.76/km^{2})
- Time zone: UTC-6 (Central (CST))
  - Summer (DST): UTC-5 (CDT)
- ZIP code: 73557
- Area code: 580
- FIPS code: 40-47350
- GNIS feature ID: 2412976
- Website: www.medicinepark.com

Medicine Park is a town in Comanche County, Oklahoma, United States, situated in the Wichita Mountains near the entrance to the 60,000-acre (240 km^{2}) Wichita Mountain Wildlife Refuge. Medicine Park has a long history as a vintage cobblestone resort town. Medicine Park is located near the city of Lawton and Fort Sill. It is an exurb, part of the Lawton Metropolitan Statistical Area. Many of the original structures are constructed of naturally formed cobblestones—these red granite cobblestones are unique to the Wichita Mountains. As of the 2020 census, Medicine Park had a population of 411.

== History ==
Medicine Park was founded on July 4, 1908, by Elmer Thomas, a young lawyer who had just become a member of the Oklahoma State Senate and would end his career in 1951 as a U.S. senator.

In the spring of 1906, five years after the establishment of the Wichita Mountains National Forest, Elmer Thomas envisioned the need not only for a recreational area but for a permanent water source for the newly founded nearby city of Lawton.

When the resort first opened, it consisted merely of a large surplus Army tent with a wooden floor where hot meals were served. Two dams were constructed on Medicine Creek to form Bath Lake Swimming Hole, and a limited number of campsites were constructed.

Tourists came to Medicine Park from around Oklahoma and North Texas. Soon, there were two inns—the Outside Inn and the Apache Inn. Bob Wills and The Texas Playboys became regulars at the Dance Hall from 1929 through the late 1930s. Soon numerous other famous bands of the day made their way through Medicine Park en route to big city venues in Oklahoma City, Dallas, and Fort Worth.

The nearby Wichita Mountains Wildlife Refuge and Lake Lawtonka attracted thousands of people. Medicine Park became a population center for richer families. Many diverse people came into the new cobblestone community. Several famous people have lived here, including Will Rogers, Wiley Post, Frank Phillips, Al Capone, Bonnie and Clyde, Pretty Boy Floyd, Lil Hardin Armstrong, Colonel Jack Abernathy, Les Brown, Roy Rogers, and Dale Evans.

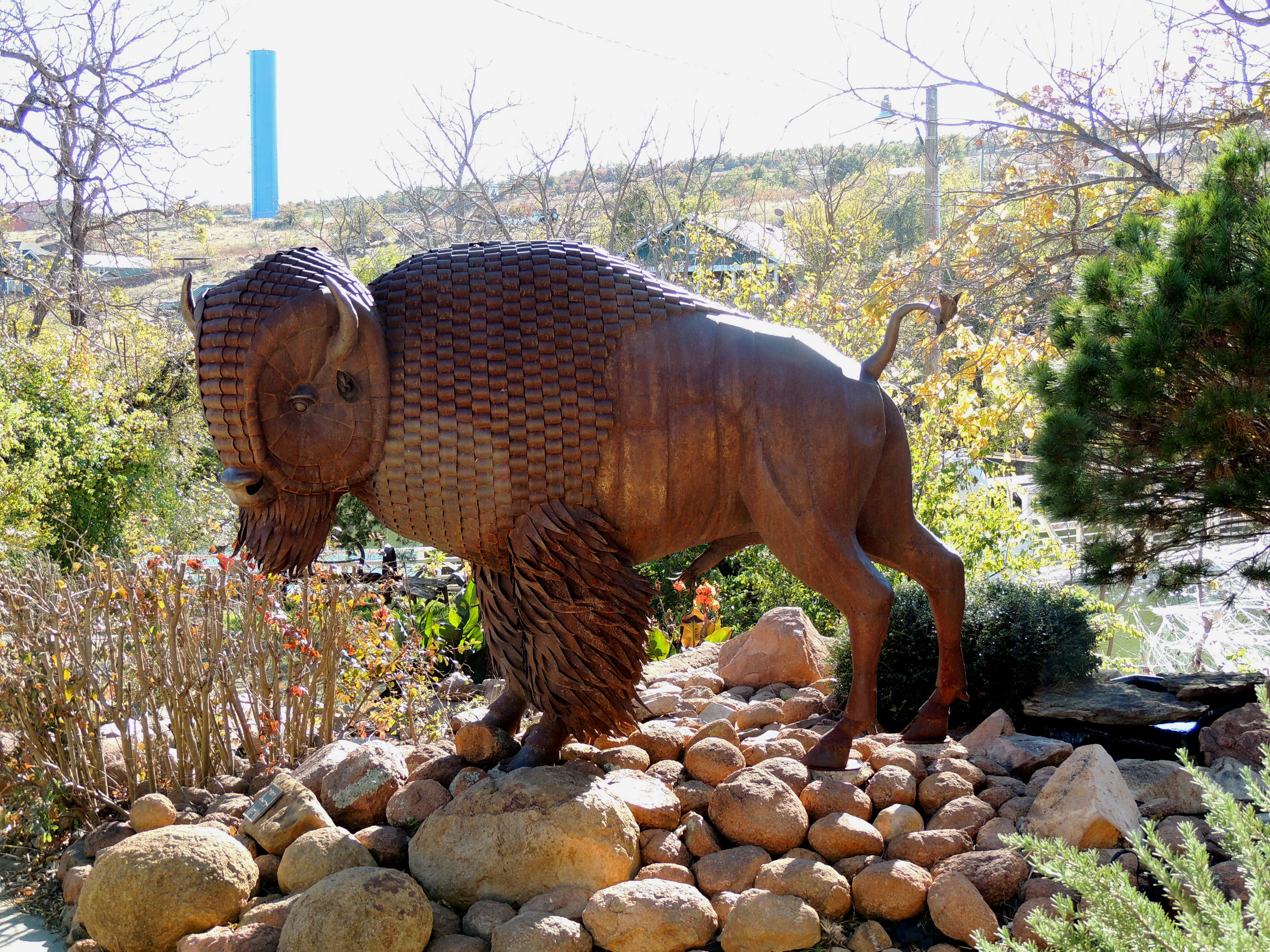
Bison bronze sculpture located near Medicine Park Music Hall entrance

An Oklahoma television station reported on June 13, 2018, that Expedia had named Medicine Park as "the fifth prettiest town in the U.S." The Lake Lawtonka Trails, including around Medicine Park, were rated by one mountain bike enthusiast site as the No. 1 best mountain bike trail area in Oklahoma, out of sixty-two contenders.

== People of interest ==
Elmer Thomas, the founder of Medicine Park, served in the Oklahoma State Senate from 1907 to 1920, was a member of the United States House of Representatives from 1923 to 1927 and a United States senator from 1927 until 1951.

== Geography ==
According to the United States Census Bureau, the town has a total area of 1.7 square miles (4.4 km^{2}), of which 1.7 square miles (4.4 km^{2}) is land and 0.1 square miles (0.26 km^{2}) (2.89%) is water.

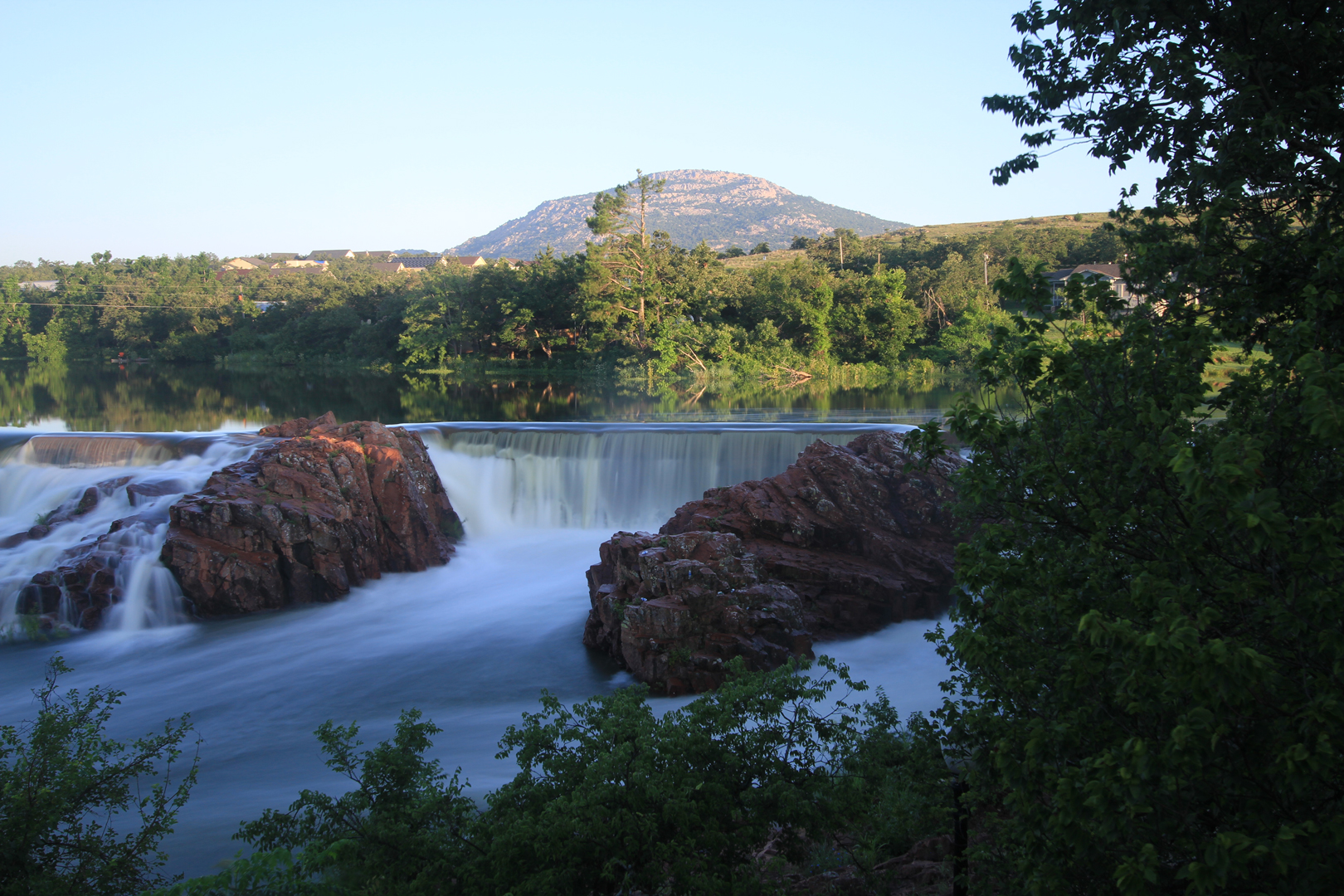
Medicine Creek with Mount Scott in background

== Demographics ==
Historical population
Census	Pop.	Note	%±
1970	483		—
1980	437		−9.5%
1990	285		−34.8%
2000	373		30.9%
2010	382		2.4%
2020	411		7.6%
U.S. Decennial Census

=== 2020 census ===
As of the 2020 census, Medicine Park had a population of 411. The median age was 52.8 years. 13.4% of residents were under the age of 18 and 28.7% of residents were 65 years of age or older. For every 100 females there were 93.9 males, and for every 100 females age 18 and over there were 96.7 males age 18 and over.

0.0% of residents lived in urban areas, while 100.0% lived in rural areas.

There were 210 households in Medicine Park, of which 17.6% had children under the age of 18 living in them. Of all households, 45.7% were married-couple households, 23.3% were households with a male householder and no spouse or partner present, and 24.3% were households with a female householder and no spouse or partner present. About 32.8% of all households were made up of individuals and 14.3% had someone living alone who was 65 years of age or older.

There were 289 housing units, of which 27.3% were vacant. The homeowner vacancy rate was 3.1% and the rental vacancy rate was 19.4%.

Racial composition as of the 2020 census
Race	Number	Percent
White	333	81.0%
Black or African American	3	0.7%
American Indian and Alaska Native	20	4.9%
Asian	6	1.5%
Native Hawaiian and Other Pacific Islander	3	0.7%
Some other race	2	0.5%
Two or more races	44	10.7%
Hispanic or Latino (of any race)	23	5.6%

=== 2010 census ===
According to the census of 2010, the town had 382 people living in 191 households and 112 families. The population density was 189.6 inhabitants per square mile (73.2/km^{2}). There were 306 housing units at an average density of 151.8 per square mile (58.6/km^{2}). The racial makeup of the town was 88.2% White, 0.8% African American, 3.7% Native American, 0.8% Pacific Islander, 2.4% from other races, and 3.7% from two or more races. Hispanic or Latino of any race were 6.0% of the population.

Of the 191 households, 16.2% had children under the age of 18 living in them, 49.7% were married couples living together, 5.8% had a female householder with no husband present, and 41.4% were non-families. Of all households 35.6% were composed of individuals, and 8.3% had someone living alone who was 65 years of age or older. The average household size was 2.00 and the average family size was 2.58.

In the town, the population was spread out, with 14.1% under the age of 18, 3.7% from 18 to 24, 29.3% from 25 to 44, 39.8% from 45 to 64, and 13.1% who were 65 years of age or older. The median age was 47.6 years. For every 100 females, there were 100 males. For every 100 females age 18 and over, there were 105 males.

=== 2000 census ===
According to the 2000 census, the median income for a household in the town was $26,607, and the median income for a family was $33,929. Males had a median income of $22,321 versus $18,854 for females. The per capita income for the town was $13,236. About 19.6% of families and 18.1% of the population were below the poverty line, including 28.9% of those under age 18 and 16.7% of those age 65 or over.

== Historic structures ==
The following are NRHP-listed places in and around Medicine Park:

- The Medicine Park Hotel and Annex, on E. Lake Drive.
- Holy City of the Wichitas Historic District, in the vicinity of Medicine Park at 262 Holy City Road. This is the site of the longest running passion play in North America (1926), with permanent sets built with native granite at the west end of the Wichita Mountains Wildlife Refuge.

== Utilities ==
- Medicine Park Telephone Company provides service, including DSL, to the town and the surrounding area.
- Telephone, Internet, and Digital TV Services is provided by Hilliary Communications.

== Education ==
The community is divided between two school districts: partially in Elgin Public Schools, and partially in Lawton Public Schools. Zoned schools for residents of the Lawton school district are Pioneer Park Elementary School, MacArthur Middle School, and MacArthur High School. The Elgin district's comprehensive high school is Elgin High School.

The Oklahoma Department of Education closed the Medicine Park School District in 1990 and split it between the Elgin and Lawton school districts.

== Gallery ==
Cultural depictions of Medicine Park, Oklahoma
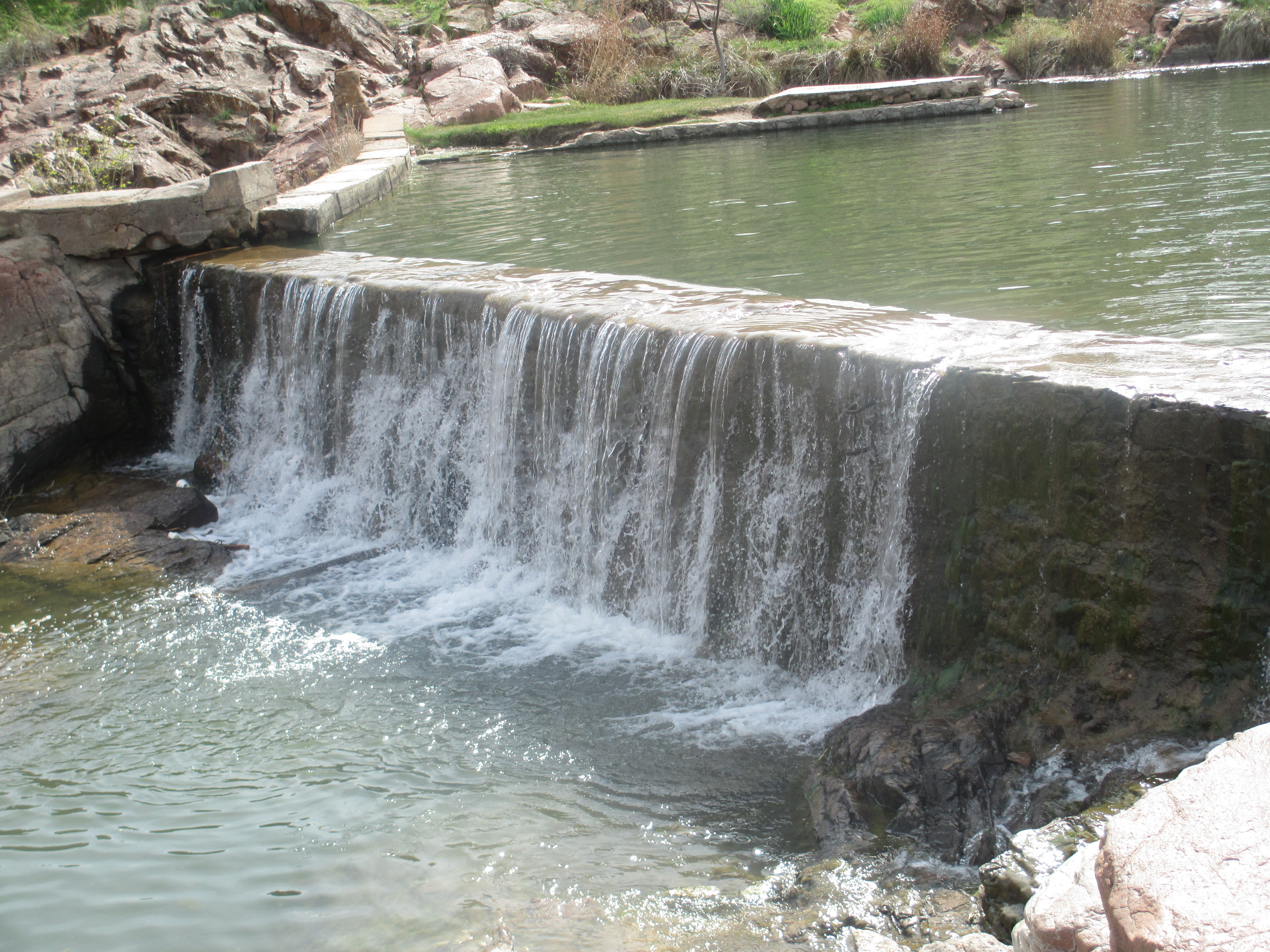
Waterfall on Medicine Creek

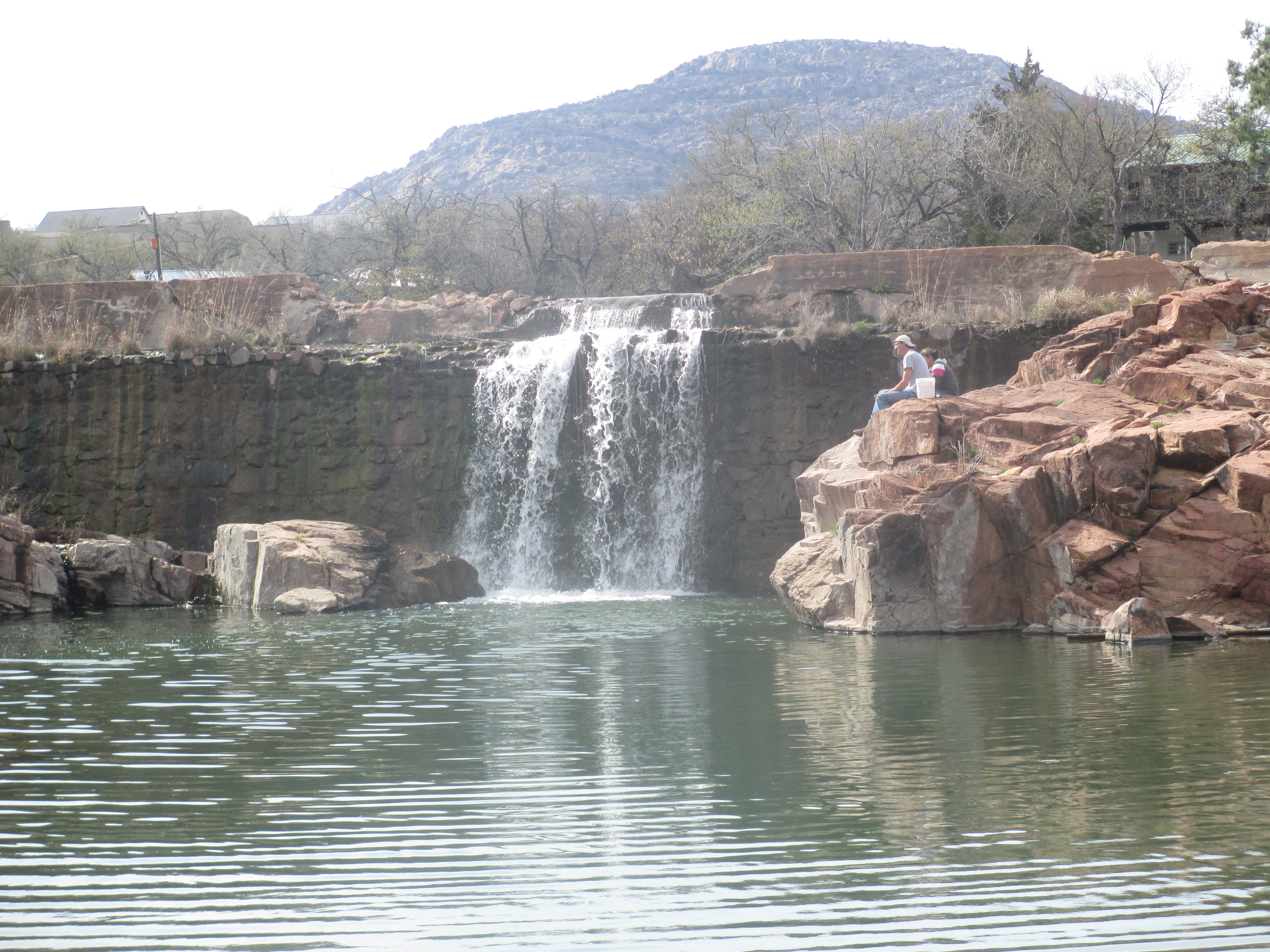
Waterfall on Medicine Creek with Mount Scott in the background

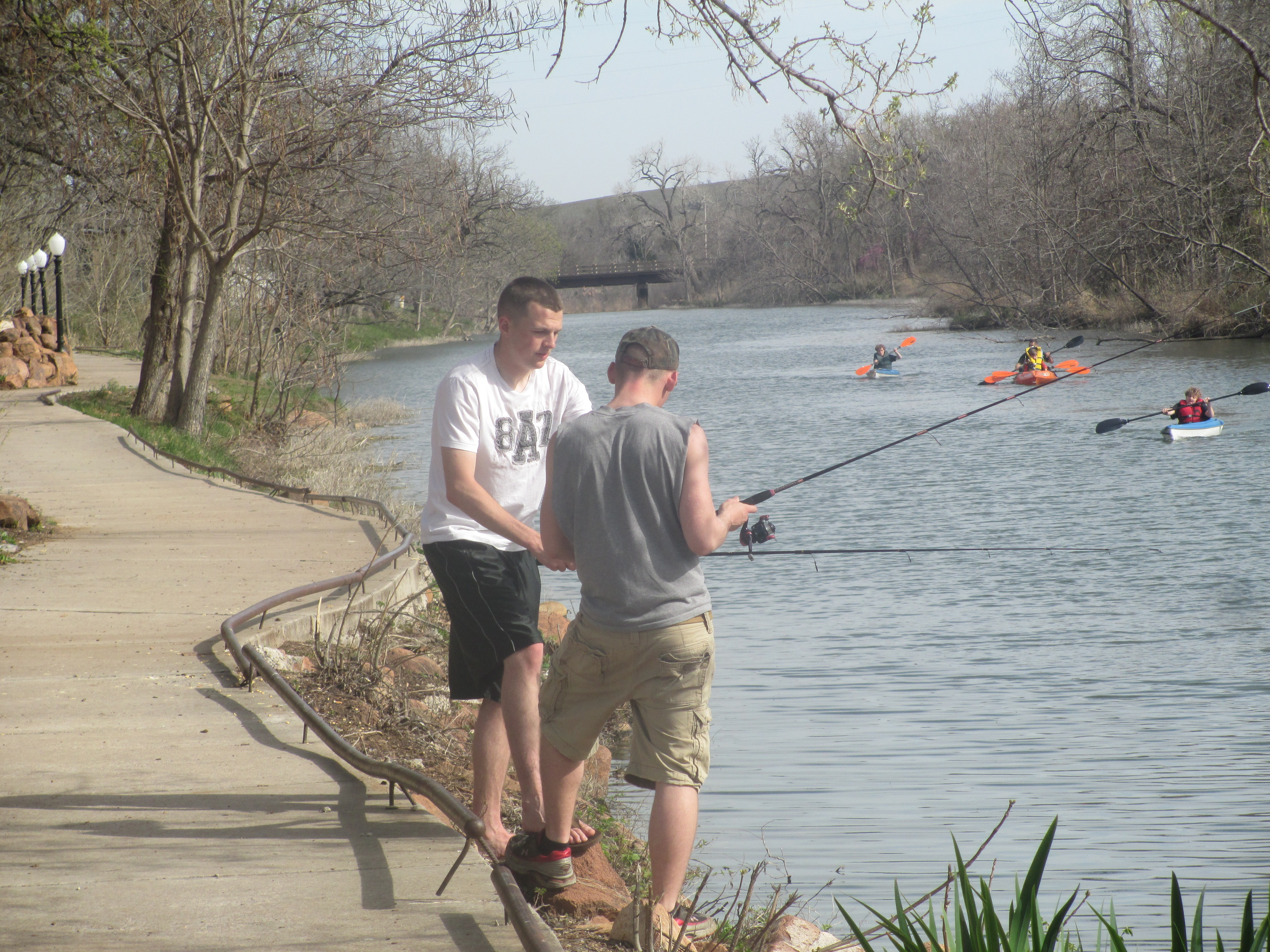
Fishing and kayaking on Medicine Creek (2013)

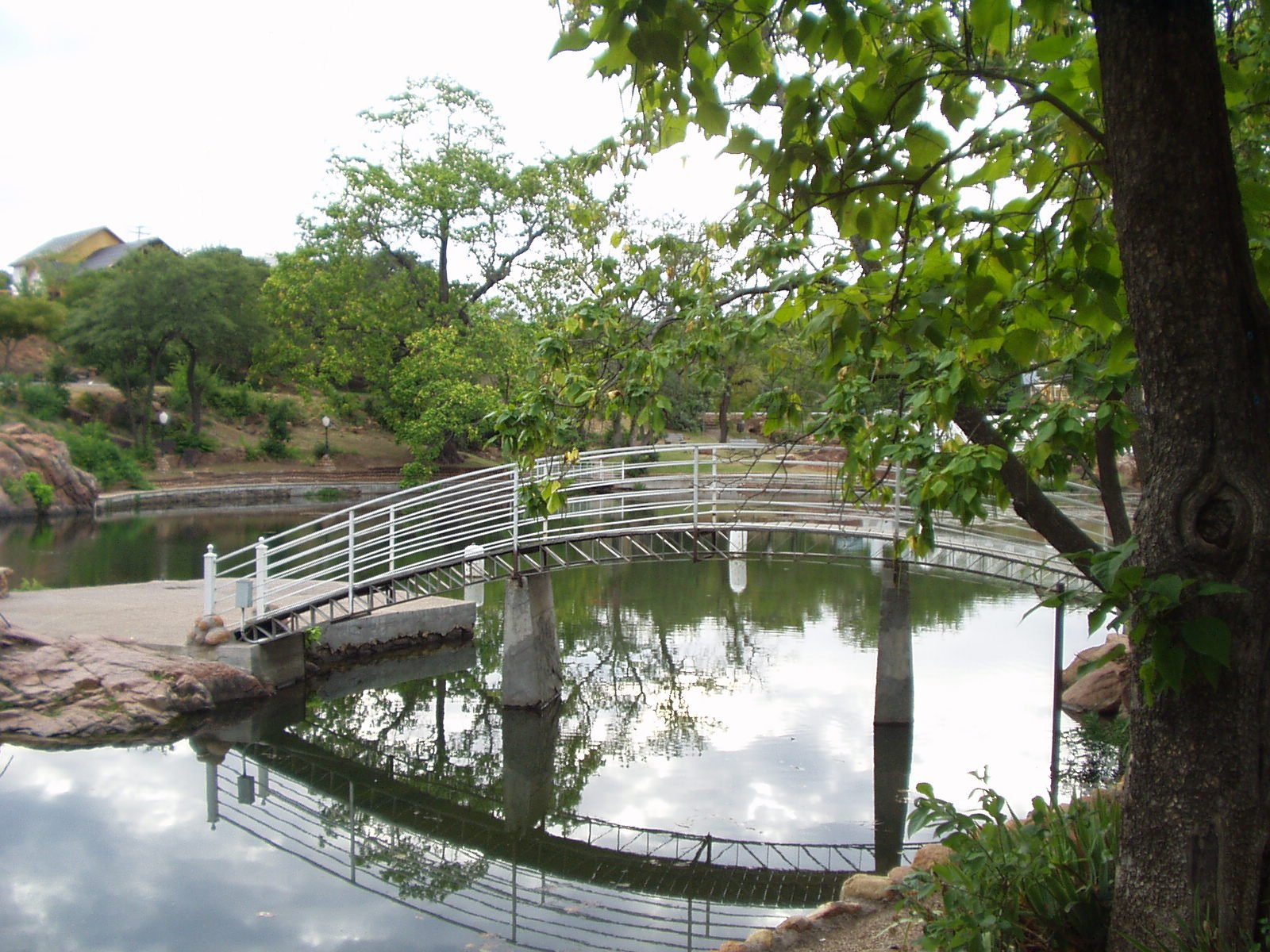
Bridge over Medicine Creek

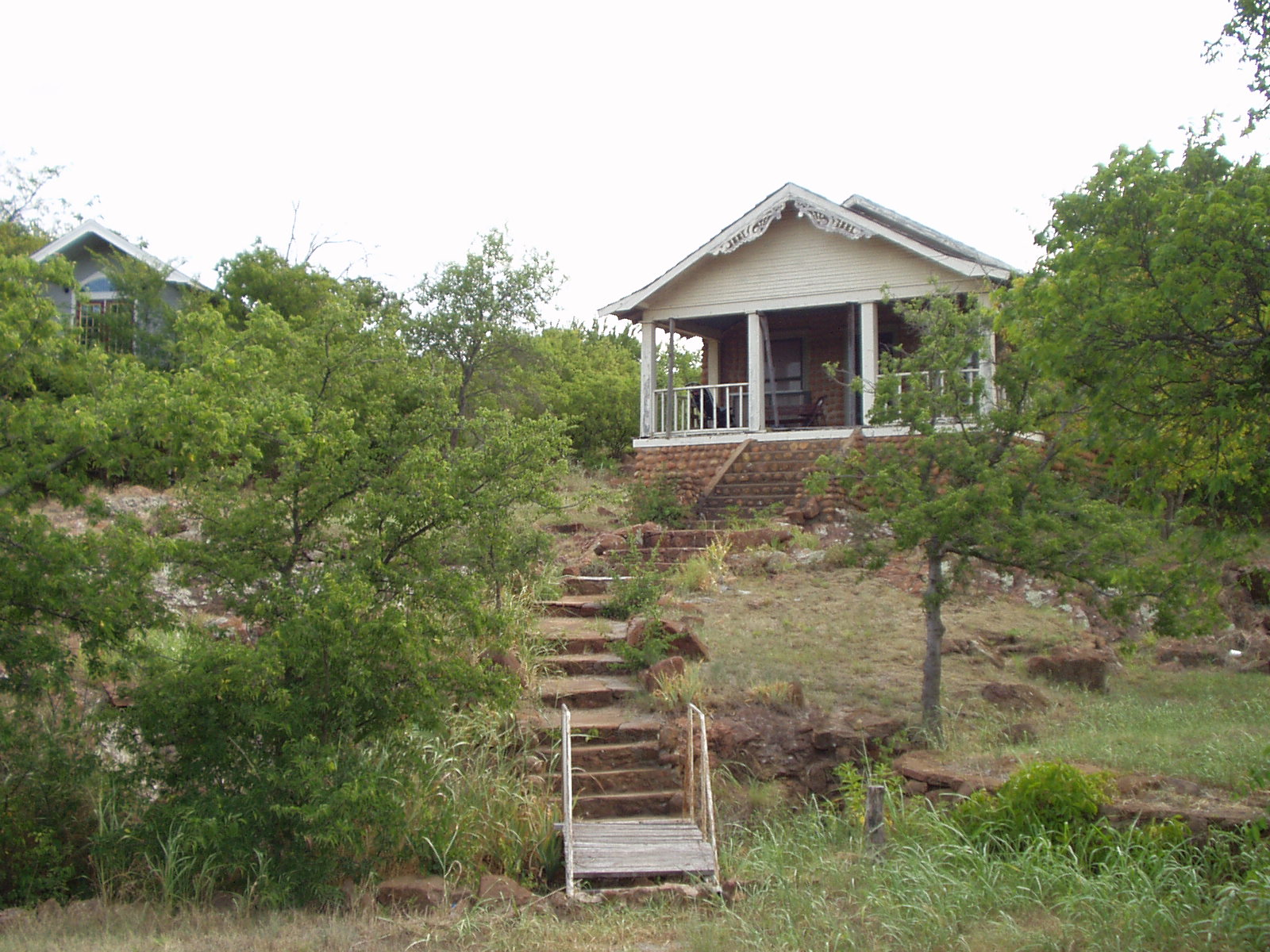
Original cobblestone house in Medicine Park

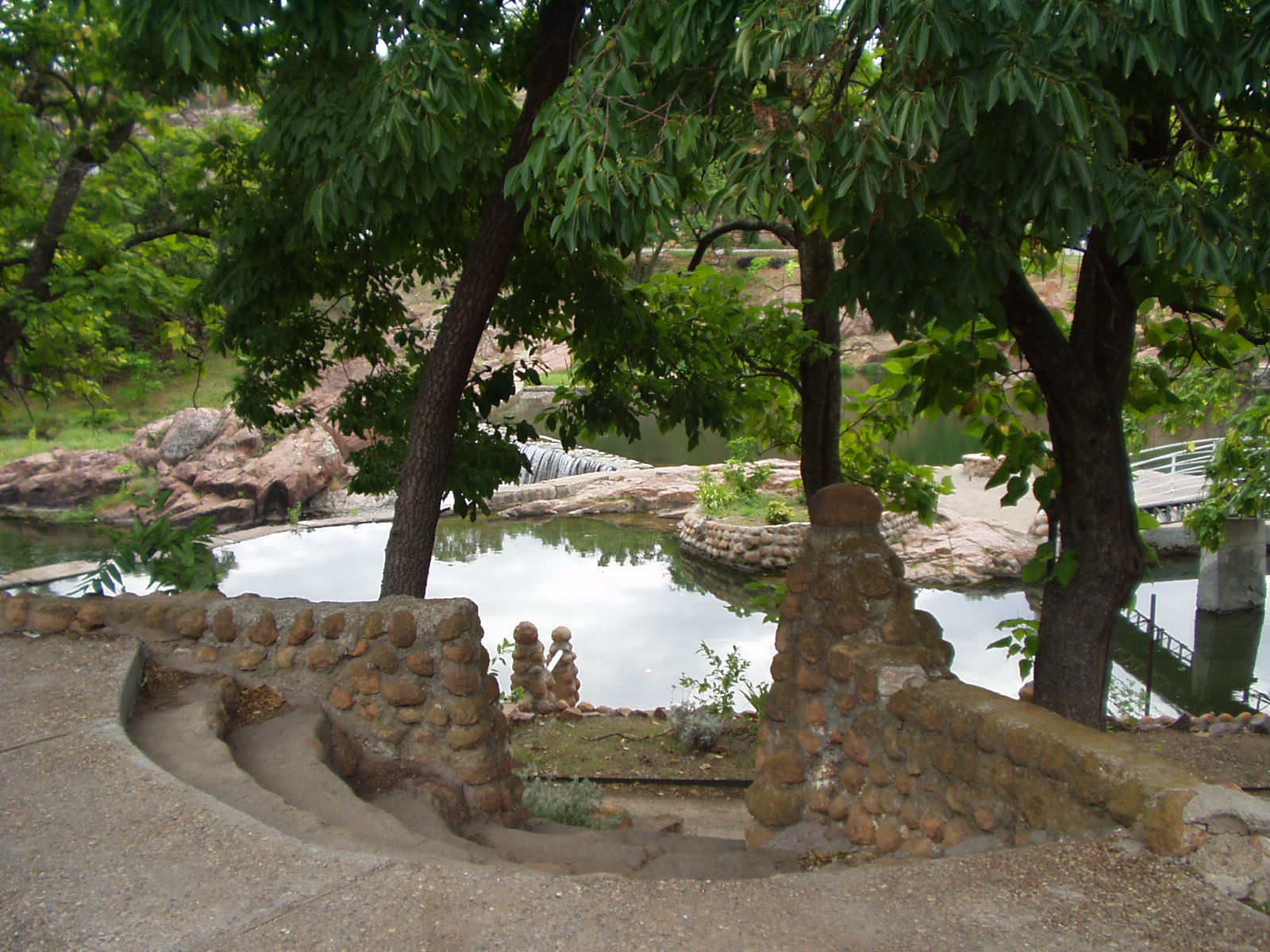
Cobblestone construction in Medicine Park

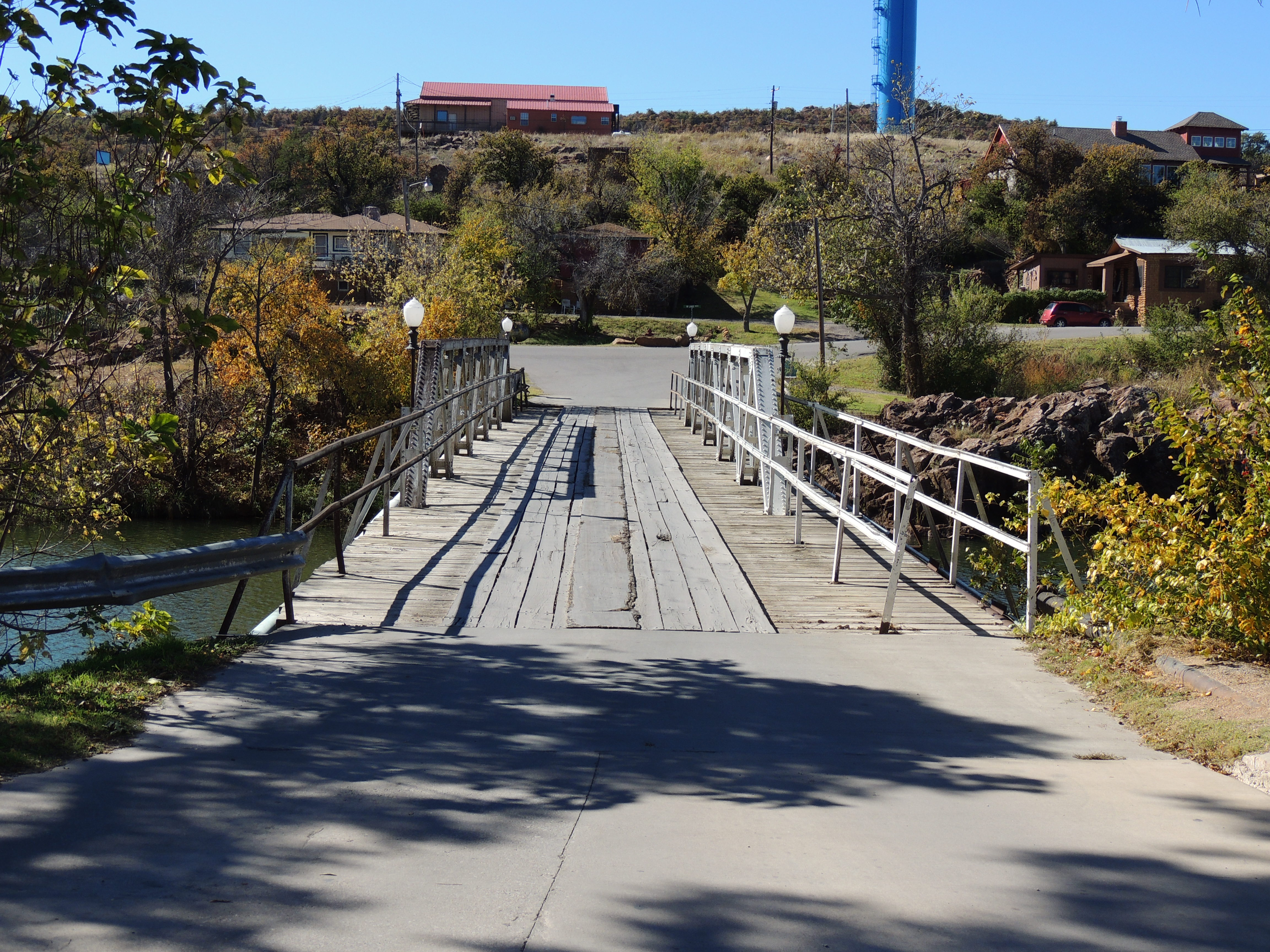
Medicine Creek bridge

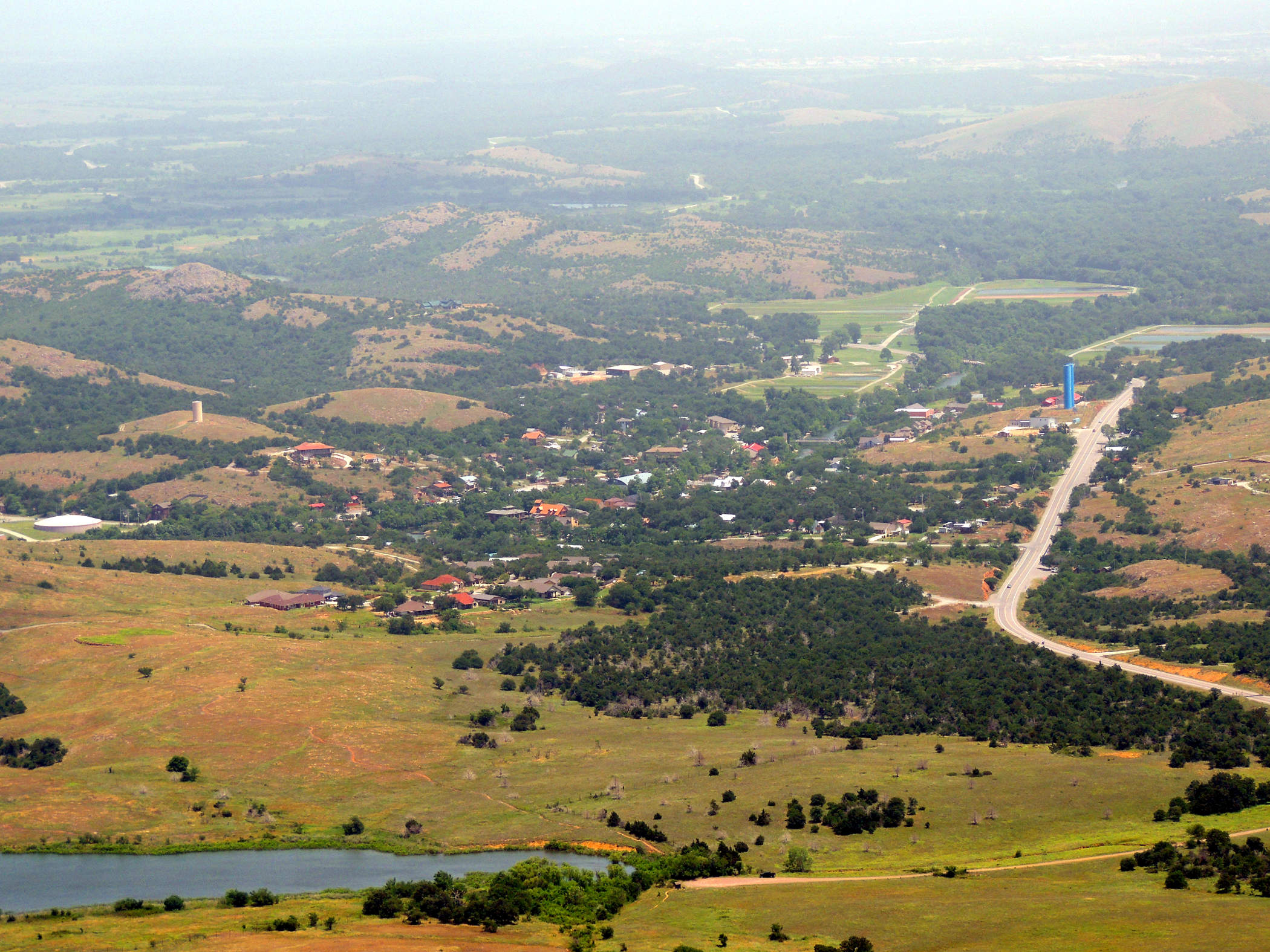
Bird's-eye view of Medicine Creek watershed and Medicine Park community

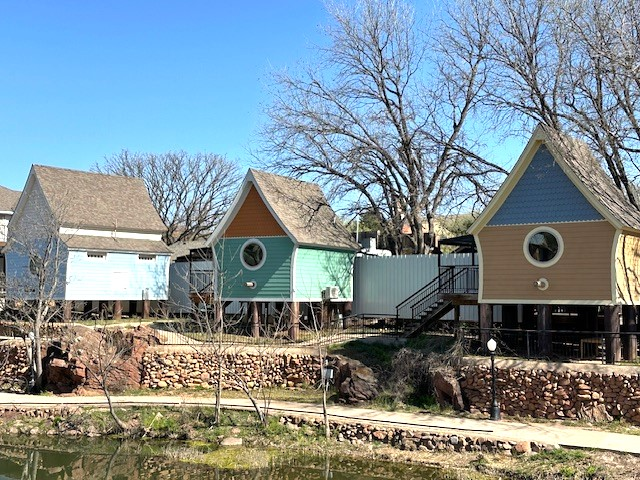
Medicine Park Birdhouse Lodgings, 3-2025

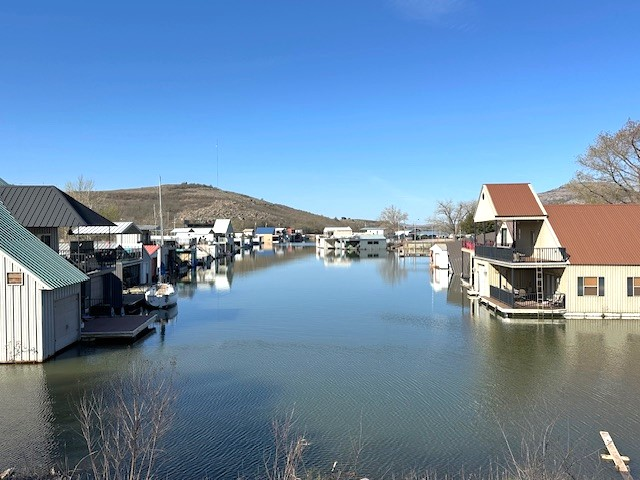
Medicine Park Lake Scene, 3-2025

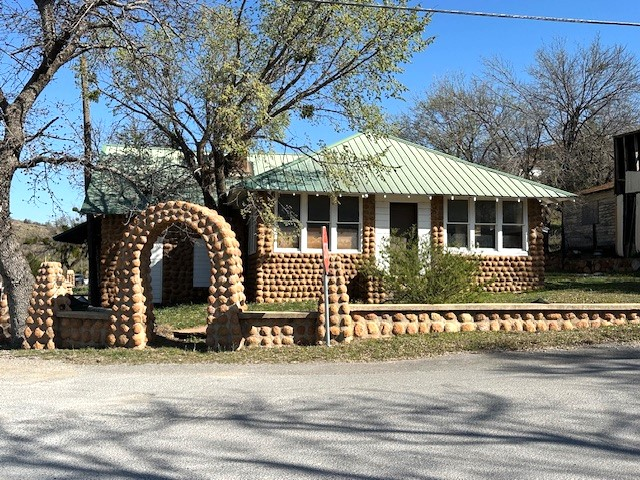
Example of a Medicine Park cobblestone house, 3-2025

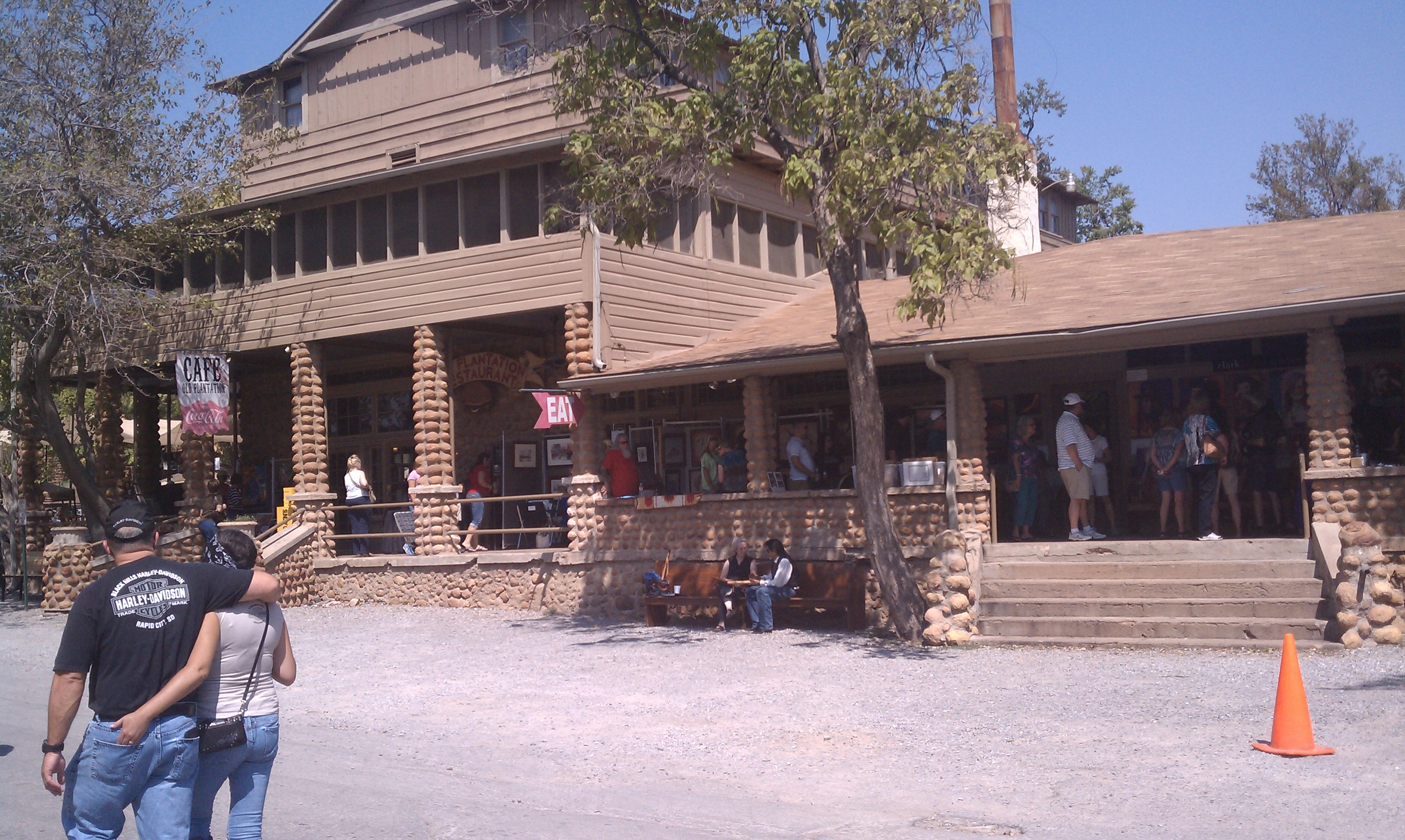
Medicine Park Hotel and Annex is listed on the National Register of Historic Places listings in Comanche County, Oklahoma
