= Holy City of the Wichitas =

Religious themed park in Lawton, Oklahoma

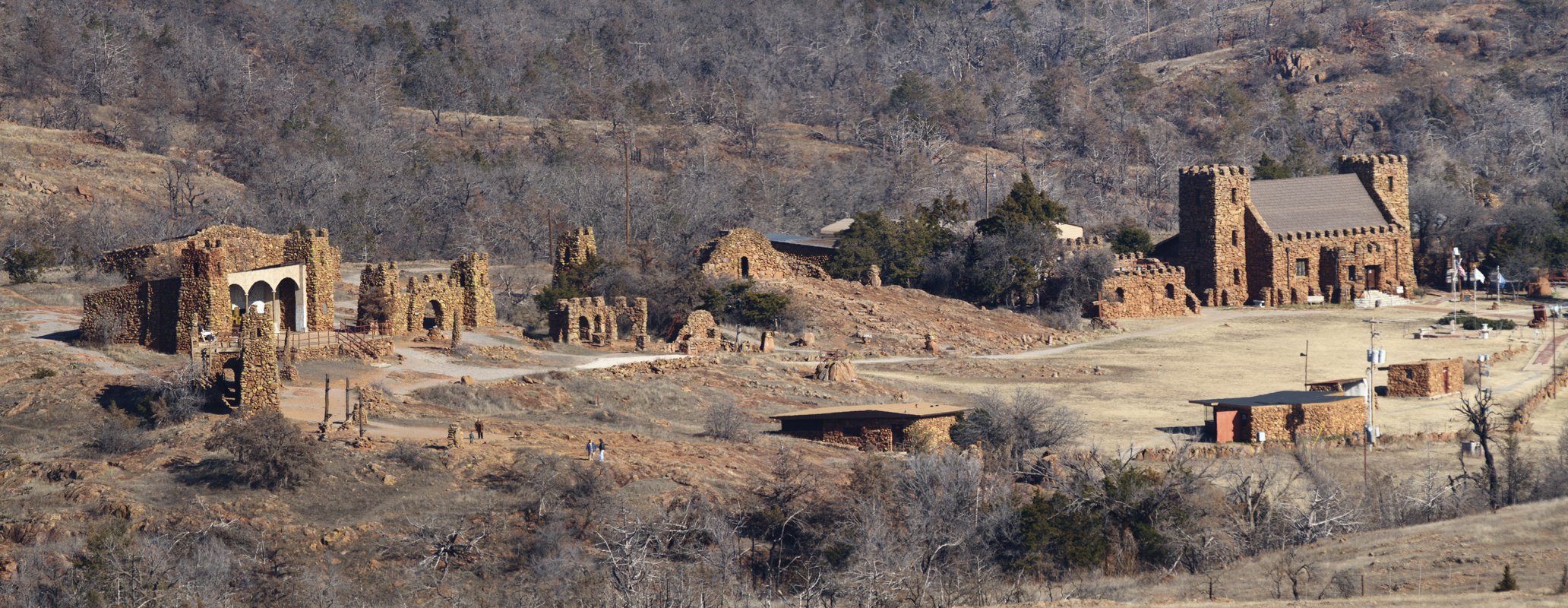
- Interactive map of Holy City of the Wichitas
- Address: 262 Holy City Rd, Lawton, OK 73507
- Location: Lawton, Oklahoma
- Coordinates: 34°44′34″N 98°35′28″W

Website
- theholycityofthewichitas.org

The Holy City of the Wichitas is a public park and outdoor theater in the Wichita Mountain Wildlife Refuge outside of Lawton, Oklahoma. Made up of locally sourced granite, the 66-acre (26,700 m^{2}) park aims to replicate ancient Jerusalem during Biblical times. The park features a large stage with eighteen stone structures, shrines, and watchtowers, as well as interactive displays, a museum, and a gift shop. Notable landmarks include the Christ of the Wichitas statue and the World Chapel, an on-site church with murals by artist Irene Malcolm.

It is home to North America’s longest continuously running Easter Pageant, “The Prince of Peace”, which has occurred annually since 1926.

== History ==
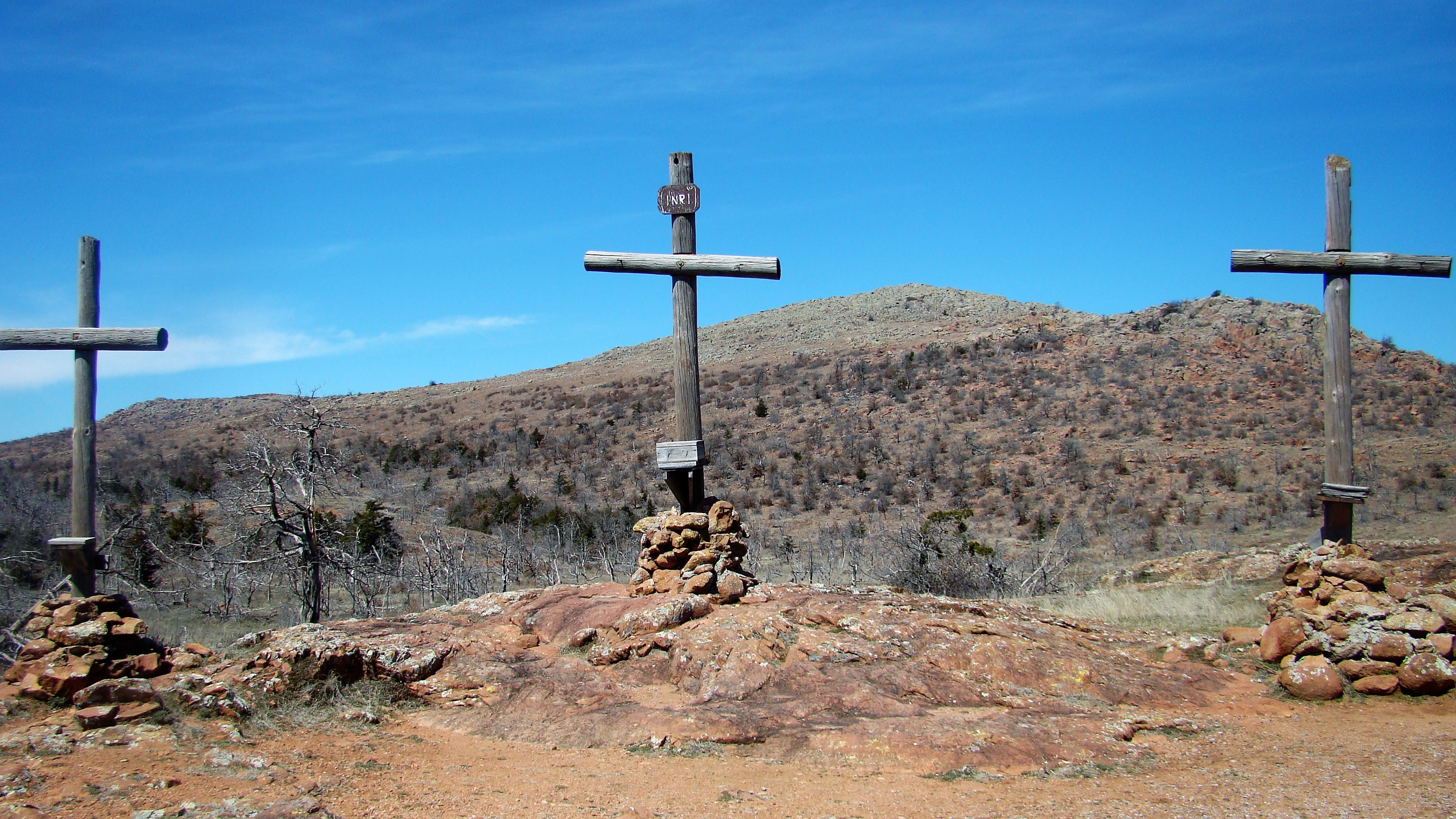
Wooden crosses with granite pedestals representing Calvary

The park was first envisioned by Reverend Anthony Mark Wallock, who viewed the natural stone landscape of the Wichita Mountains as one similar to ancient Judea and Samaria. An Austrian immigrant raised in Chicago, Illinois, Wallock accepted leadership of Lawton's Congregational Church in 1924. On April 4, 1926, Wallock led the first Easter service in nearby Medicine Park, Oklahoma with a cast of five, which had an attendance of roughly 200 people.

In 1930, six thousand people attended Wallock's Easter service, which significantly increased the pageant's production. Oklahoma City's WKY radio broadcast the pageant live to over two hundred stations nationwide. Afterwards, annual attendance regularly reached over 100,000 attendees.

Between 1934 and 1935, the Works Progress Administration (WPA) aided in the formal construction of the Holy City at its current location.

For the 1935 pageant, famed Dole Air Race pilot Art Goebel inscribed "Christ Arose" in skywriting above the park grounds.

Attendance peaked in the 1940s and has slowly decreased since.

== The World Chapel ==
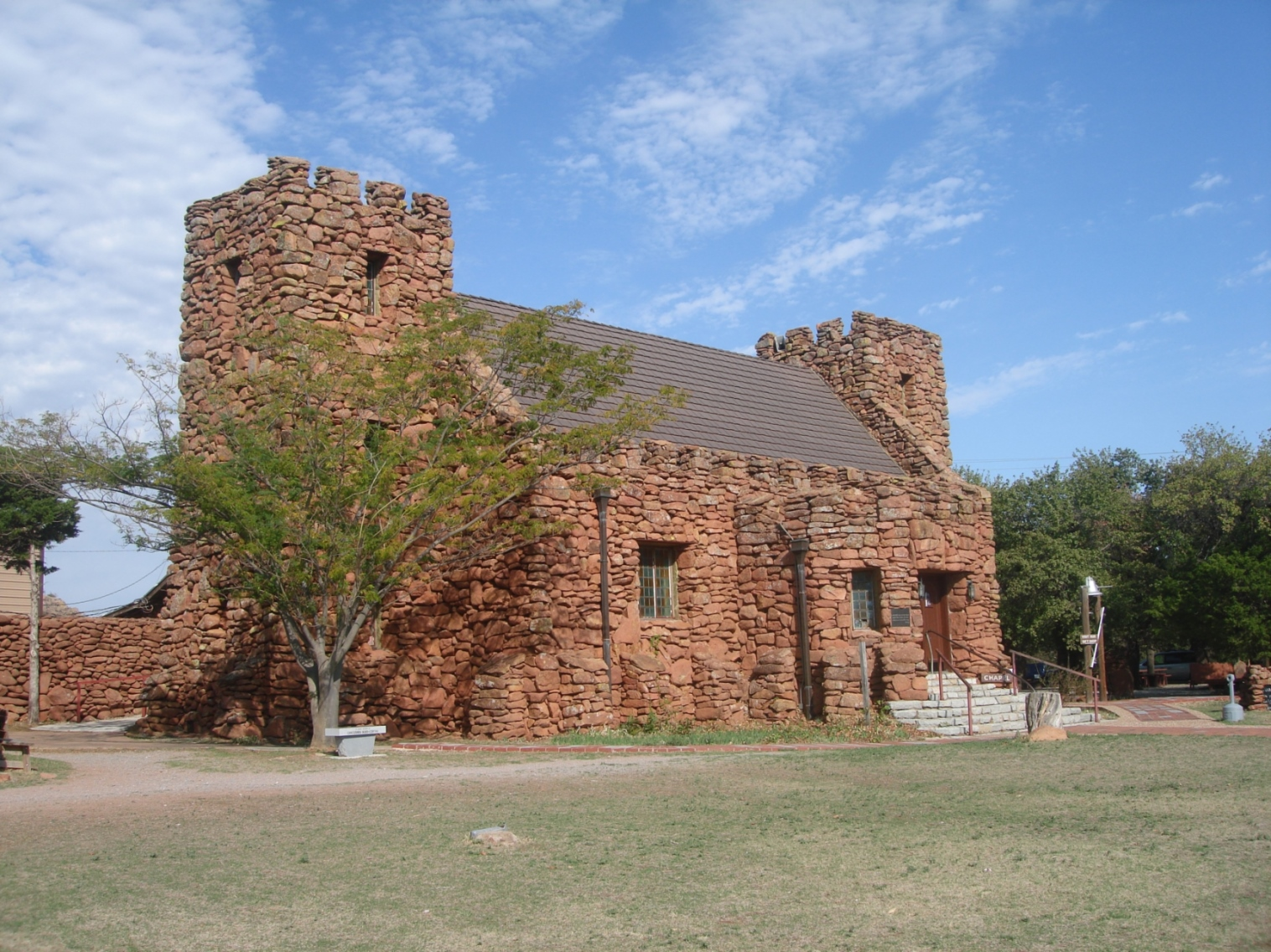
Exterior of the World Chapel

The World Chapel is a granite chapel in the center of the park, which was built in 1936. Its interior was modeled after Christ Church in Alexandria, Virginia due to that being the church George Washington attended.

Wallock aimed for the chapel to be a nonsectarian place of worship, having been quoted as saying, "It shall be a place for all faiths and all races, and shall not represent any particular sect or denomination, but equally be open to all mankind."

In 1945, local artist Irene Malcom began work on the oil paintings that would form the murals on the interior of the chapel. Painting various angels, apostles, and religious figures, she often worked for twelve-hour days and with no pay. In addition to painting, she also incorporated clay sculpture, woodcarvings, and tile mosaics. She completed the interior in 1952.

Her work on the interior is now vastly acclaimed and is considered her masterwork. She is sometimes called the 'Michelangelo of the Wichitas'.

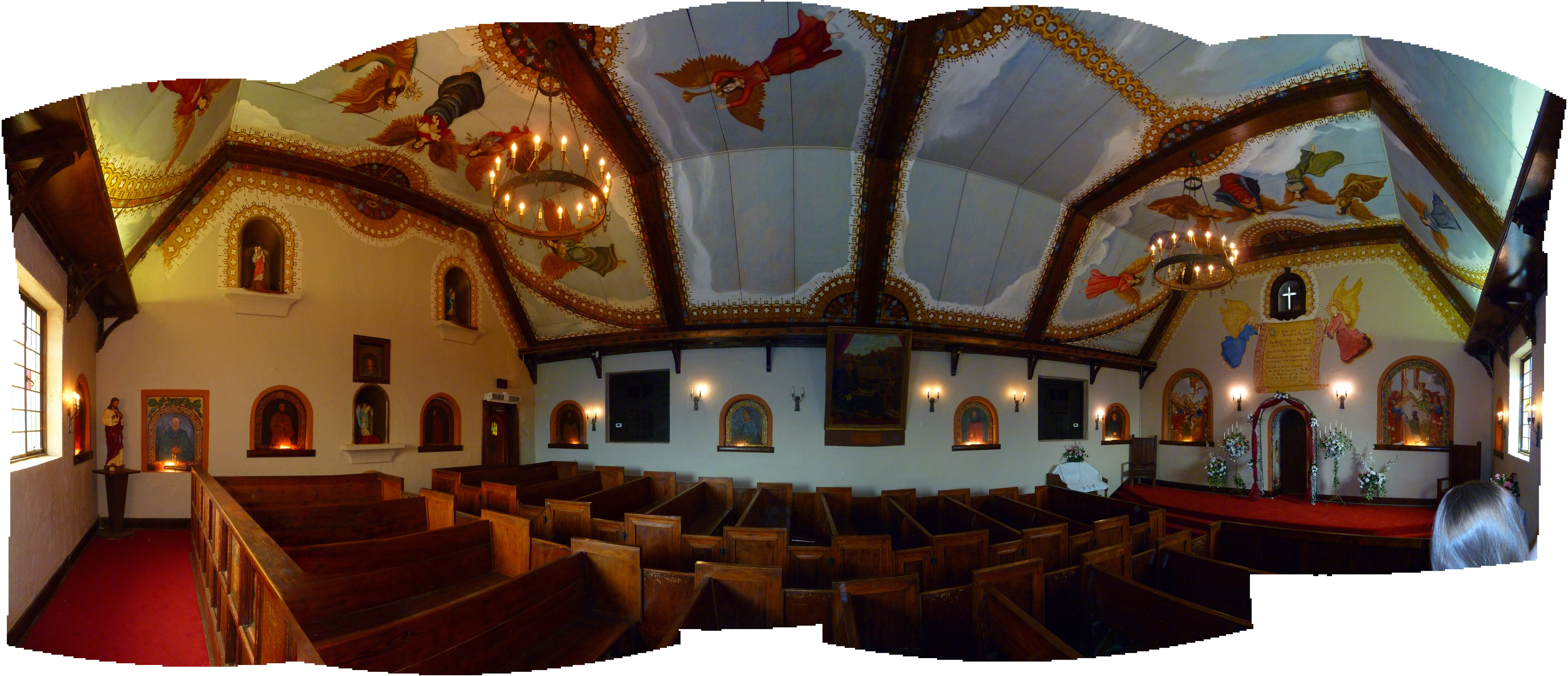
Panoramic view the World Chapel interior

== Christ of the Wichitas ==
The Christ of the Wichitas is a 23-foot statue that aims to depict Jesus Christ. The eleven-foot white marble statue sits on a twelve-foot granite pedestal overlooking the mountains. It was installed in 1975 after the death of Rev. Wallock and was dedicated in his memory.

In 1981, a lawsuit was filed by the American Civil Liberties Union (ACLU) regarding the statue. The ACLU, which called for the removal of the religious imagery on federal land, claimed it went against the separation of church and state. A federal judge dismissed the case in December of that year.
