= Wichita Mountains =

Mountains in the US state of Oklahoma

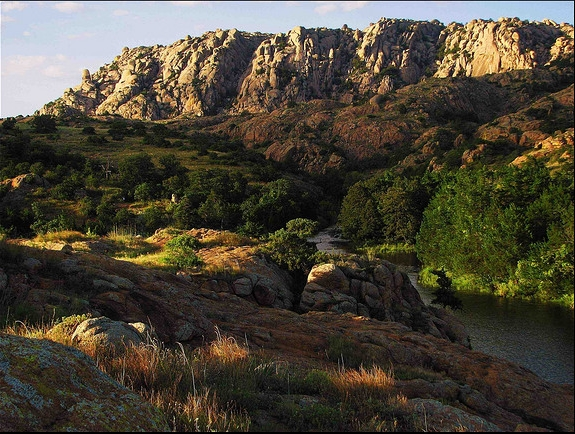
- Elk Mountain, in the eastern Wichita Mountains

Highest point
- Peak: Haley Peak (officially unnamed)
- Elevation: 2,481 ft (756 m)
- Coordinates: 34°50′22″N 98°48′13″W

Dimensions
- Length: 60 mi (97 km) northwest-southeast
- Width: 10 mi (16 km)

Geography
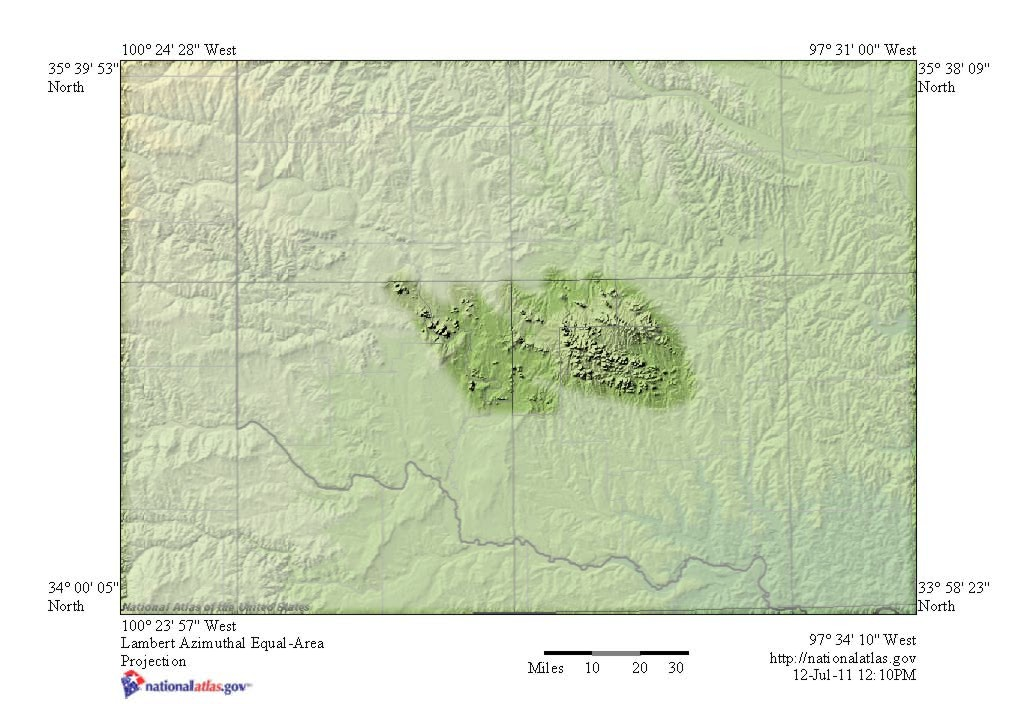
- Color digital elevation map of southwestern Oklahoma; the Wichita Mountains are highlighted
- Country: United States
- State: Oklahoma

Geology
- Orogeny: Ouachita orogeny
- Rock age(s): Cambrian, Pennsylvanian, Permian
- Rock type(s): granite, rhyolite, gabbro, conglomerate

The Wichita Mountains are located in the southwestern portion of the U.S. state of Oklahoma. It is the principal relief system in the Southern Oklahoma Aulacogen, being the result of a failed continental rift. The mountains are a northwest-southeast trending series of rocky promontories, many capped by 500 million-year old granite. These were exposed and rounded by weathering during the Pennsylvanian and Permian Periods. The eastern end of the mountains offers 1,000 feet (305 m) of topographic relief in a region otherwise dominated by gently rolling grasslands.

The mountains are home to numerous working ranches and quarry operations, the state reformatory, recreational homes and campsites, and scenic parklands. Fort Sill, home of the U.S. Army Field Artillery School, occupies a large portion of the southeastern end of the mountains.

== Recreation ==
The Wichita Mountains Wildlife Refuge (WMWR), a favorite for hikers and rock climbers in the region, is located adjacent to Cache, Medicine Park, Indiahoma, and historic Meers, and is a short drive from Lawton and Walters. Bison, elk and deer are protected on the 59,020-acre (23,880 ha) wildlife refuge. The refuge also manages a herd of longhorn cattle. A scenic highway (Highway 115) traversing the park permits leisurely views of these and other fauna.

Backcountry camping is available in the Charon Gardens Wilderness area. The park is home to a small number of fishing lakes. There are several trails for hiking. The Treasure Lake Job Corps site [now closed] is located here. Additional points of interest include the refuge's visitors center, Holy City of the Wichitas, Quanah Parker Lake & Dam, Lake Jed Johnson, and Lake Lawtonka.

Granite outcrops in the Charon Gardens Wilderness area, Oklahoma, 2026

Great Plains State Park is located near the geographic center of the Wichita Mountains, north of the town of Mountain Park.

Quartz Mountain Nature Park and Arts Center is a recreation area located north of the city of Altus.

== Geography ==
There is some disagreement as to whether Mount Scott or Mount Pinchot is the highest mountain in the WMWR. The Oklahoma Historical Society states flatly that Mount Scott is the tallest at 2,464’ above sea level, followed by Mount Pinchot at 2,461’. However, the website PeakVisor lists Pinchot as the tallest in the Preserve at 2,467’, conceding only that since Pinchot is closed to the public, Scott at 2,464’ is the highest accessible peak. The website PeakBagger, while listing Scott as 2464.76’, goes so far as to give Pinchot’s height as 2476.48’. In any event, Scott is the certainly the tallest accessible mountain. A paved road leads to the summit, offering views of the granite promontories to the west, the wind farm on the Slick Hills to the north, the lakes to the south and east, Fort Sill, and Lawton. The highest peak in the Wichita Mountains (including areas outside the Refuge) is the officially unnamed mountain sometimes called Haley Peak, at 2,481 ft (756 m). It is located on private property just outside the northwest corner of the refuge.

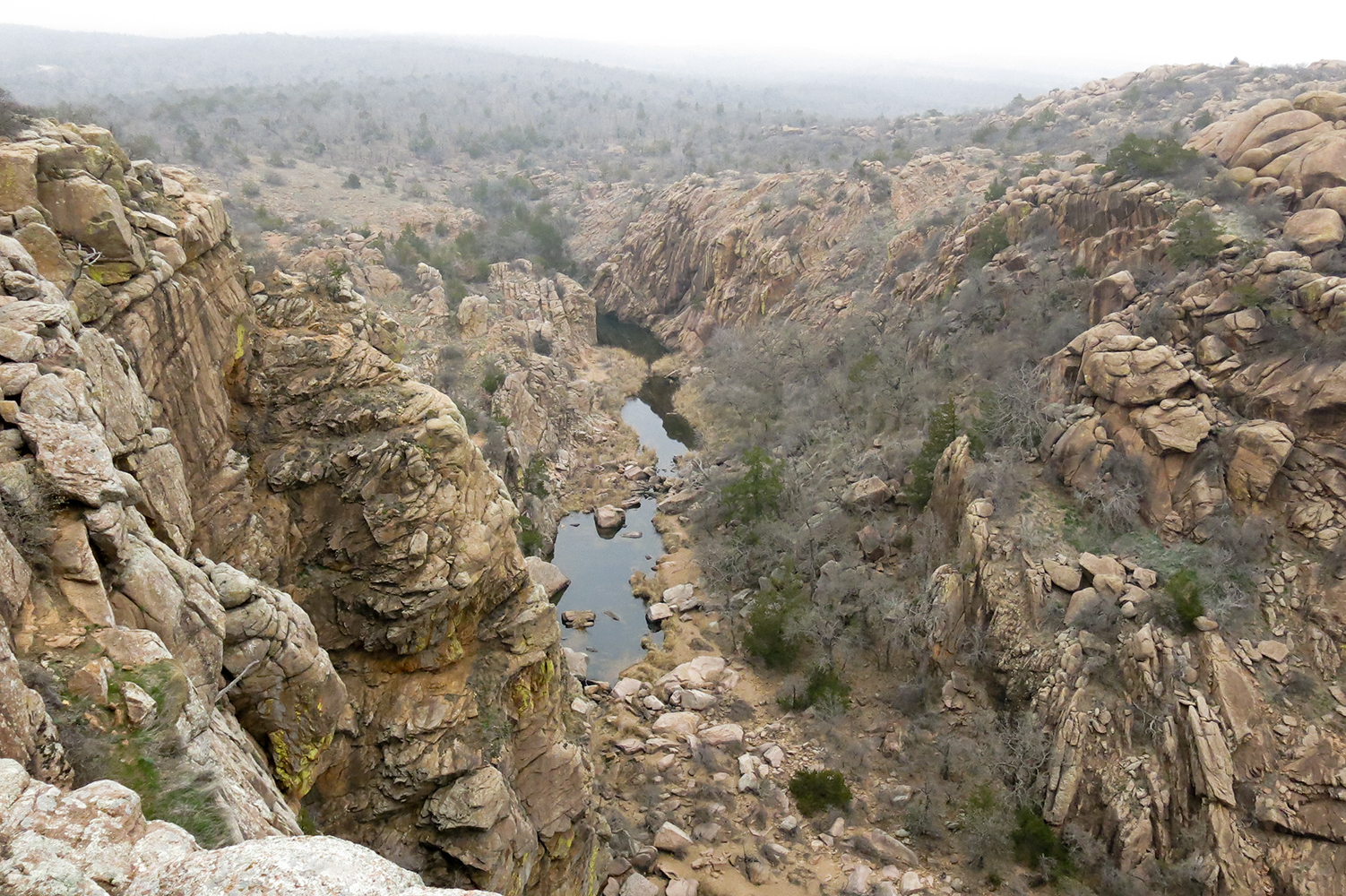
Wichita Mountains Narrows

== History ==
When the area was part of Indian reservations and therefore off-limits to non-Native Americans, the Wichita Mountains were rumored to contain rich gold deposits. When the area was first opened up for settlement, many prospectors staked mining claims, and towns were laid out to serve the presumed bonanzas, but no economic deposits were found. The gold boom was prolonged by some unscrupulous assayers who found gold in every sample, but the miners eventually gave up, leaving behind ghost towns such as Wildman, Oklahoma.

== Geology ==
Granite knobs in the Wichita Mountains.

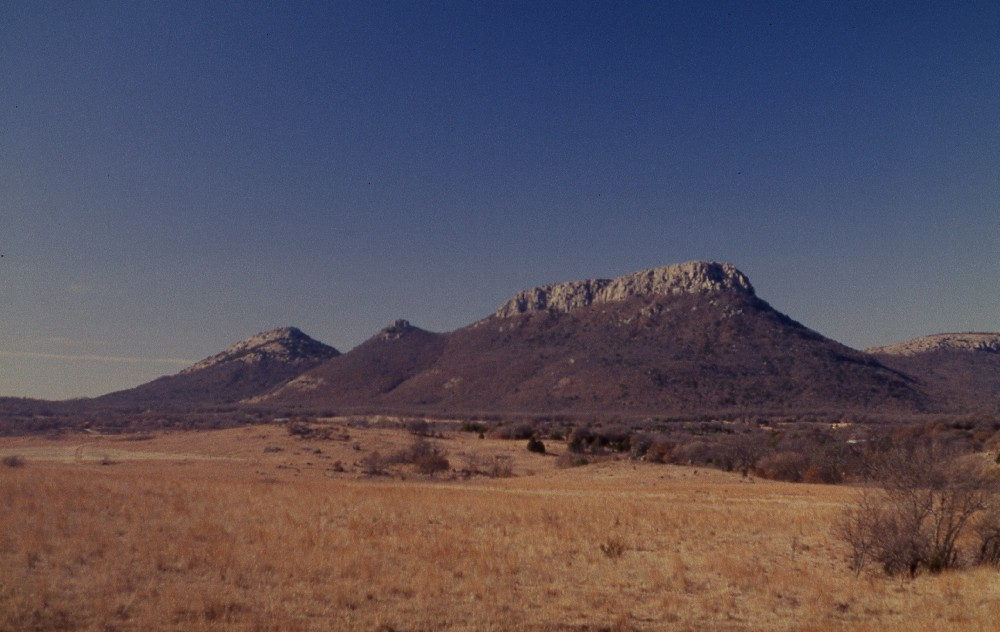
Granite overlying gabbro - a view of Mount Sheridan from the northeast

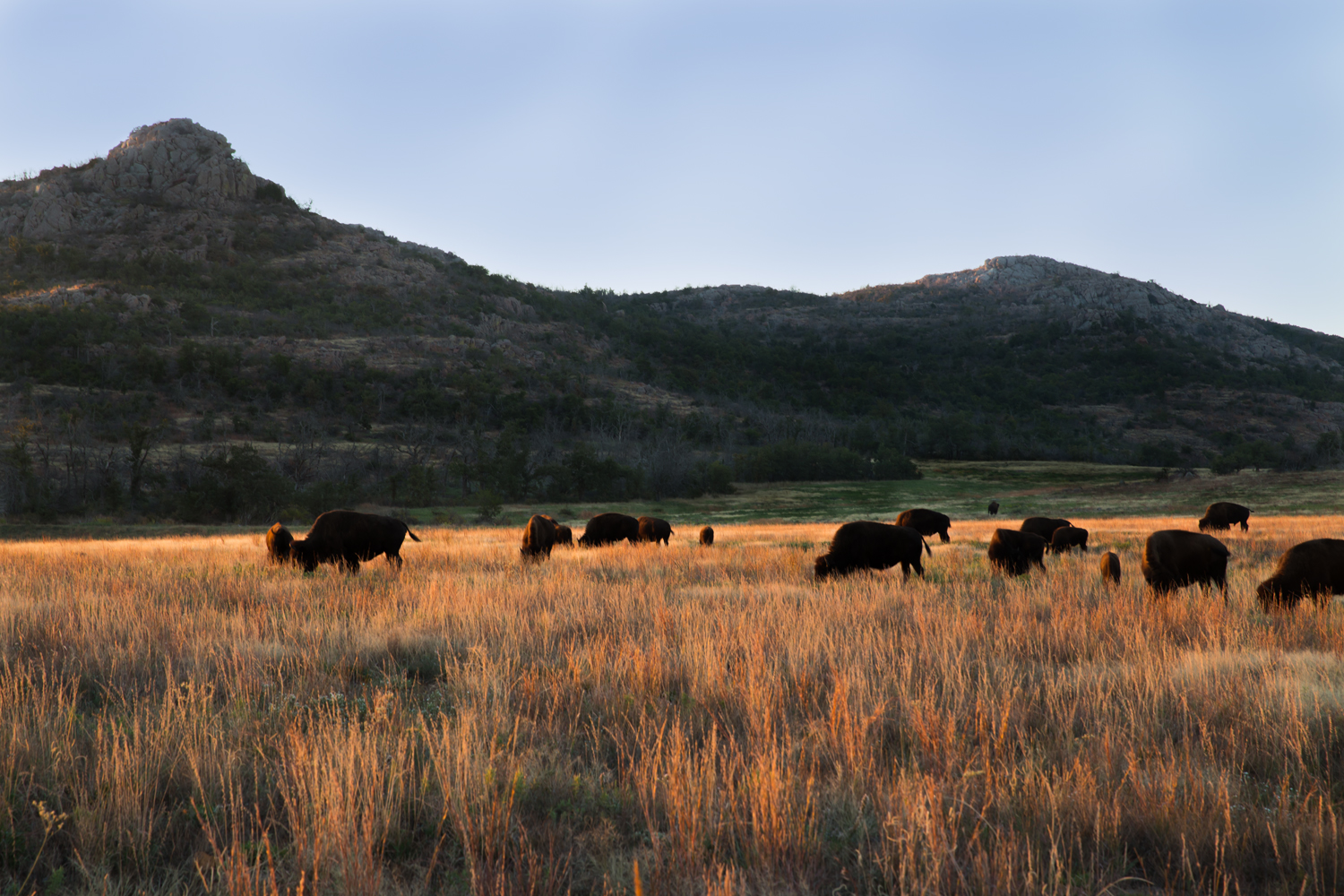
American bison

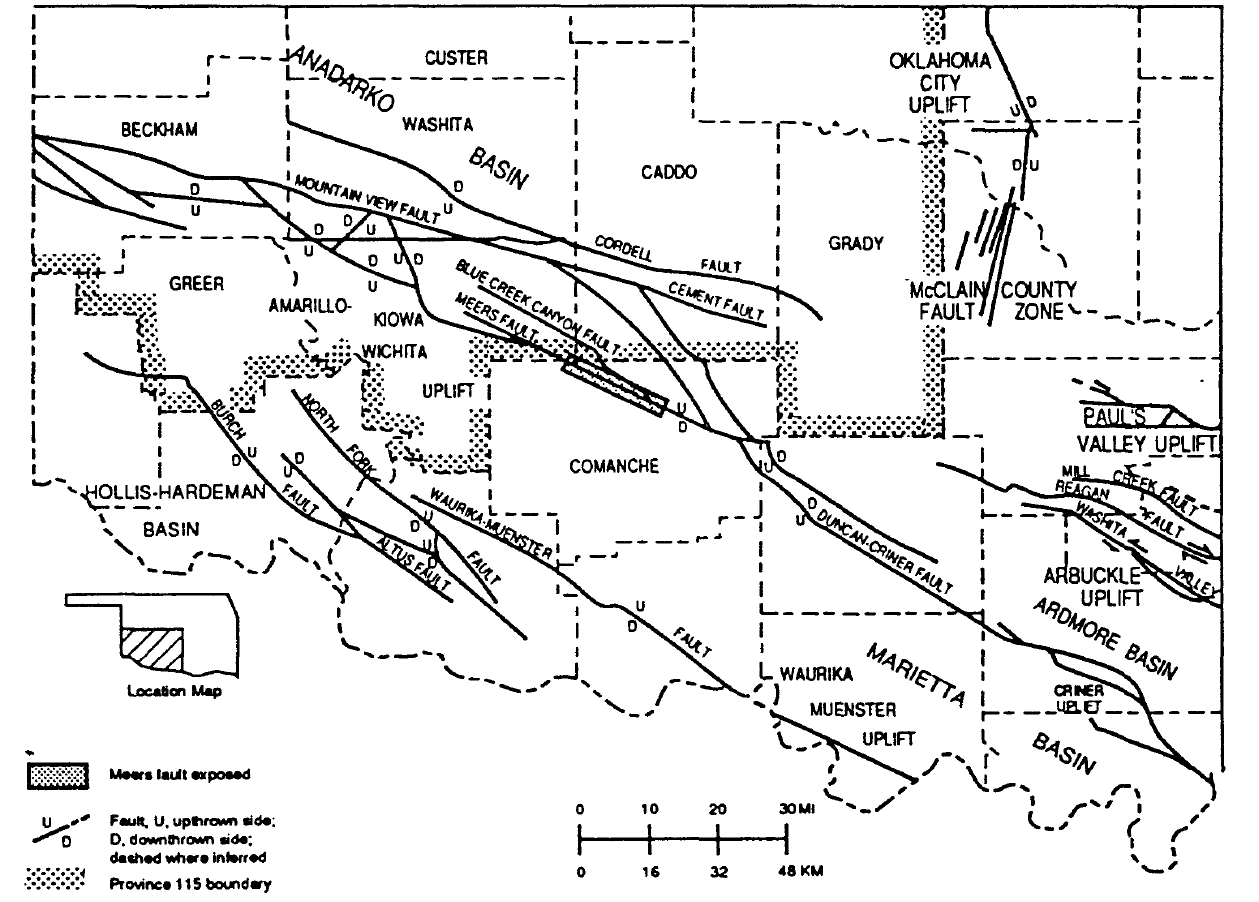
Wichita Uplift fault map

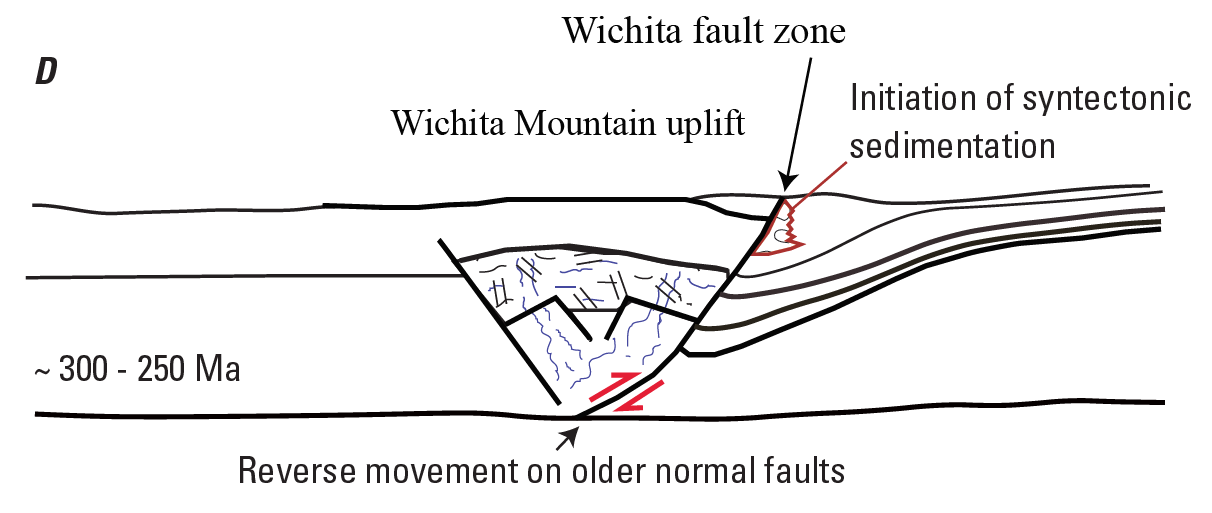
Wichita Uplift fault cross section, with the Anadarko Basin to the right of the fault zone

=== Overview ===
The Wichita Mountains are rocky promontories and rounded hills made of red and black igneous rocks, light-colored sedimentary rocks, and boulder conglomerates. The Wichita Mountains were formed in four distinct geologic episodes following a failed continental rift.

1. Magmatism induced by continental rifting just prior to and in the Cambrian Period produced the granites and rhyolites (the red rocks), gabbroic rocks, anorthosites, and diabases (the black rocks).
2. Subsidence resulted in burial by sandstones and carbonates (the light-colored rocks) during the early Paleozoic.
3. Uplift during the Pennsylvanian Ouachita Orogeny brought these rocks to the surface as mountains.
4. Weathering and erosion during the Permian Period flattened the mountains and produced a mantle of conglomerates.

The mountains themselves are Permian landforms covered and preserved by river-borne sediments in the Permian and partially excavated only in recent geological times. Exposure of these fossil mountains is greatest towards the southeast; much of the western part of the Permian range remains buried under sandstones and mudstones.

=== Details ===
The geologic history of the region began with the deposition of late Precambrian to early Cambrian sandstones collectively known as the Tillman metasedimentary group. These sediments were intruded by a coarse mafic layered complex as the region began to rift apart during breakup of the Neoproterozoic continent, Pannotia. The exposed portion of this unit, named the Glen Mountains Layered Complex, consists of gabbro, anorthosite and troctolite. Recent high-precision dating yields an age of 532.49 ± 0.15 Ma. These are the dark gray rocks found throughout the Raggedy Mountains, the central lowlands region of the wildlife refuge, and to the immediate north of the refuge.

Uplift and erosion followed, as the layered complex is unconformably overlain by the extensive lava flows of the Carlton Rhyolite Group. The rhyolites are a brown-red to orange porphyritic rock with 5–10 mm orange-colored alkali feldspar crystals. Most of the rounded hills on Fort Sill are made of this rhyolite, including Medicine Bluffs. Additional exposure of the rhyolite is found in Blue Creek Canyon, where Oklahoma Highway 58 cuts through the Slick Hills. Tabular intrusions of granite and plutons of hydrous gabbro exploited the boundary between the layered complex and the rhyolites. The granites, collectively named the Wichita Granite Group, vary slightly in composition and texture. The granites form the peaks and highlands in the eastern Wichitas and the isolated peaks of the western Wichitas. Some are equigranular, but most are porphyritic.

The Mount Scott Granite is the most extensively exposed Wichita Granite. It forms the topographic feature from which it takes its name, and it is distributed throughout the northern half of the wildlife refuge. Dark rounded alkali feldspars, typically one centimeter or less in diameter, dominate the porphyritic texture of this rock. SiO_{2} levels in this granite range from 72.8% to 75.8%.

Relatively small and compositionally distinct plutons, known as the Roosevelt Gabbros, are found in the eastern and central Wichita Mountains. Like the layered complex, these are dark rocks. Unlike the layered complex, they contain appreciable amounts of biotite, a mineral that forms in magmas with elevated dissolved water. One of these bodies, the Mount Sheridan Gabbro, is exposed in roadcuts at Meers and underlies the Mount Scott Granite on the north side of the wildlife refuge. Weathered gabbroic soils are thicker and support more vegetation than those generated on weathered granite, so the tree line on the north side of Mount Sheridan approximates the contact between the Mount Sheridan Gabbro and the Mount Scott Granite. Geologic relationships suggest that the granites and gabbros intruded at depths no greater than half a kilometer in the crust. Minor uplift ensued, and magmatism concluded with the intrusive emplacement of subvolcanic features: rhyolite and diabase dikes. These are poorly exposed, with the exception of a large diabase dike in the Mount Scott Granite revealed during the recent widening of Oklahoma State Highway 49, just west of Interstate 44.

Following the cessation of magmatism, the region subsided and was inundated by a shallow sea, resulting in the deposition of detrital sediments followed by carbonates. The change marks the local expression of the Sauk Unconformity. The light-colored rocks exposed in the Slick Hills are lower Paleozoic marine sediments, and are equivalent to those exposed in the Arbuckle Mountains, 100 km to the east.

During the Pennsylvanian Period (330–290 million years ago) the region was subjected to intense pressure during the continental collision or orogeny which produced the Ouachita Mountains to the east. This resulted in faulting and folding striking along a WNW direction and includes the Arbuckle and Wichita Mountains of southern Oklahoma and the Amarillo Uplift of the Texas Panhandle. Up to 20,000 feet (6,100 m) of local uplift occurred during this time.

This uplift locally created rugged mountains reduced by erosion to their present state largely during the Pennsylvanian and Permian Periods. Extensive weathering produced the tors of the Charon Gardens region and the "river" of boulders that descends the west slope of Mount Scott. Likewise, weathering produced the bowling-ball sized boulders in the Permian Post Oak Conglomerate locally found in and around the mountains. In addition to outcrops of the conglomerate, the boulders are preserved in the distinctive rock buildings of Medicine Park. As the Permian progressed, river sediments buried the Wichita Mountains, preserving them from further weathering. Recent geological erosion has removed these sediments, excavating these once buried fossil landforms.

The most common soil in the Wichita Mountains is Brico series, which has a topsoil of brown cobbly loam over a reddish brown to red cobbly clay loam or clay subsoil.
