= Quanah Parker Lake =

Reservoir in Oklahoma, US

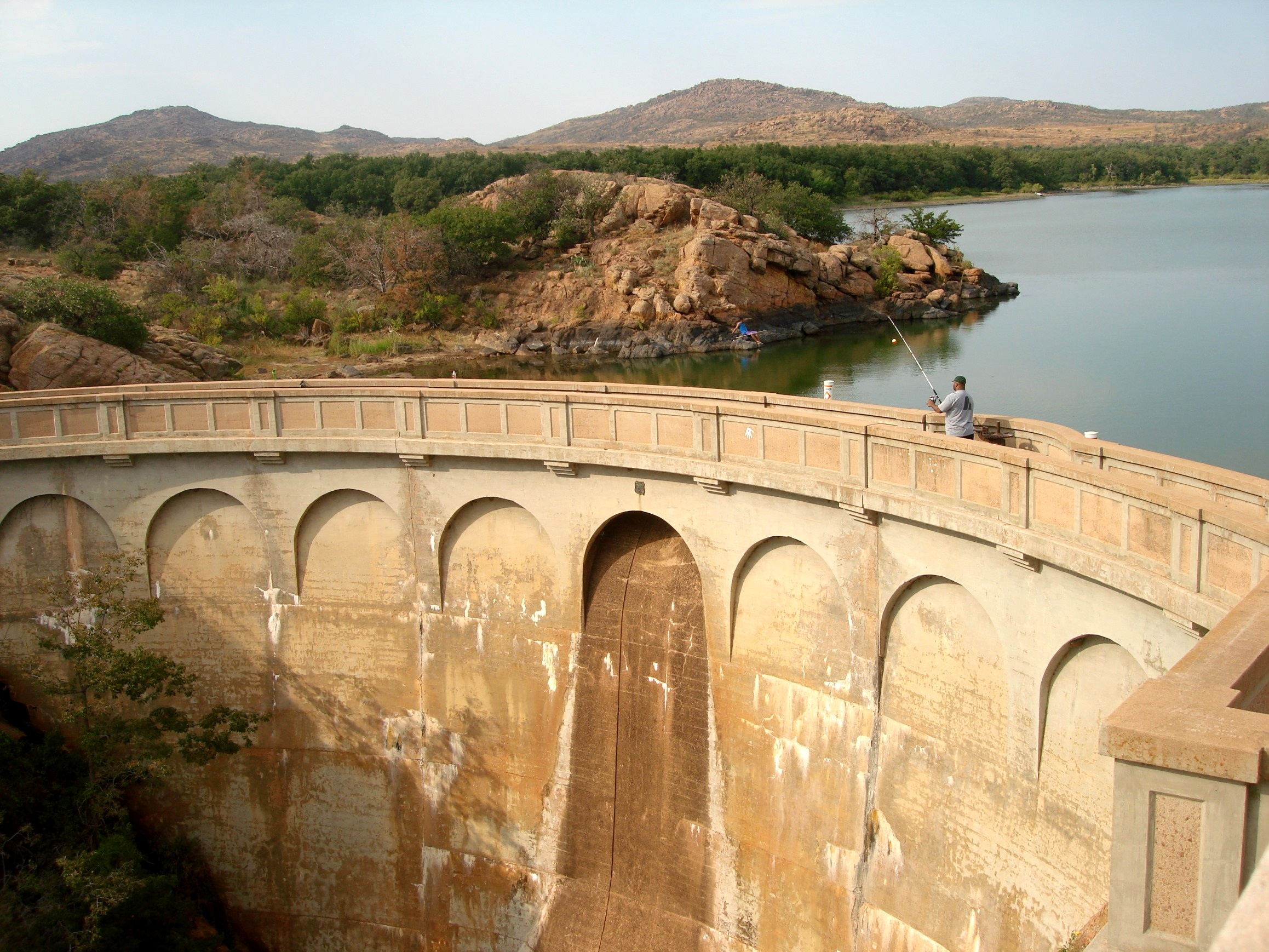
- Quanah Parker Lake Dam, Wichita Mountains Wildlife Refuge; Courtesy MARELBLU September 23, 2012

- Location within Oklahoma
- Location: Comanche County, Oklahoma
- Coordinates: 34°42′51″N 98°38′27″W
- Type: Reservoir
- Primary inflows: Quanah Creek
- Basin countries: United States
- Surface area: 89 acres (36 ha)
- Water volume: 905 acre⋅ft (1,116,000 m^{3})
- Shore length^{1}: 3 miles (4.8 km)
- Surface elevation: 1,482 ft (452 m)
- ^{1} Shore length is not a well-defined measure.

Quanah Parker Lake is a reservoir located in Comanche County, Oklahoma, and is part of the Wichita Mountains Wildlife Refuge. It was built on Quanah Creek during the 1930s as a Federal Work Project during the Great Depression, and is named for the last chief of the Quahadi Comanche tribe. It is 14.3 miles (23.0 km) from Lawton, Oklahoma.

The lake has a surface of 89 acres (36 ha) and 3 miles (4.8 km) of shoreline. Its normal elevation is 1,482 feet (452 m) and capacity is reportedly 905 acre-feet (1,116,000 m^{3}).

== See also ==
- Quanah Parker
