= Mount Scott (Oklahoma) =

Mountain in Oklahoma, USA

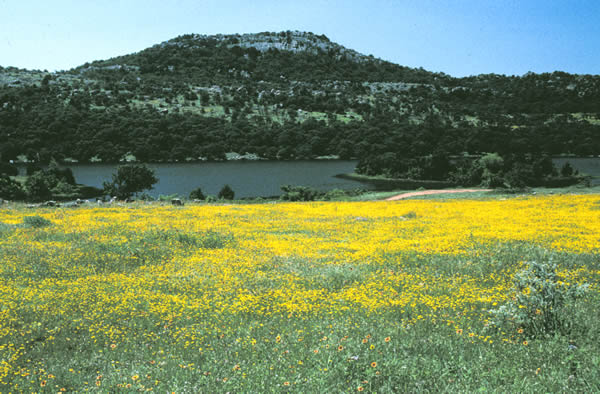
- Mount Scott, the highest peak in the Wichita Mountains Wildlife Refuge, north of Lawton.

Highest point
- Elevation: 2,464 ft (751 m) NAVD 88
- Prominence: 824 ft (251 m)
- Coordinates: 34°44′40″N 98°31′55″W

Geography
- Location within Oklahoma
- Location: Comanche County, Oklahoma, U.S.
- Parent range: Wichita Mountains
- Topo map: USGS Mount Scott

Geology
- Rock age: Cambrian Period
- Mountain type: Igneous

Climbing
- Easiest route: Paved Road

Mount Scott (Comanche: Pia Toya or "Pisaroya", "Big Mountain") is a prominent mountain just to the northwest of Lawton, Oklahoma rising to a height of 2,464 feet (751 m) and is located in the Wichita Mountains near Fort Sill Military Reservation and lies in the Wichita Mountains National Wildlife Refuge (WMWR). The US Fish and Wildlife Service is responsible for the maintenance of the area. Visitors can reach the summit by car or bicycle via a three-mile paved road. Hiking is allowed, although there are no formal trails and the paved road is open to pedestrians and bicycles from 6am to 9:30 am only. Mount Scott is also popular for its numerous rock climbing areas. The peak was named in honor of General Winfield Scott.

== Geography ==
The Wichita Mountains National Wildlife Refuge is located in southwestern Oklahoma, just north of the city of Lawton and Fort Sill. The area is located near Interstate 44, and is about 90 miles (145 km) from Oklahoma City. The Wildlife Refuge's proximity to Fort Sill means that the sound of artillery fire can often be heard by visitors and is sometimes mistaken for thunder. Mount Scott often was used for training artillery geodetic computers and future Army Survey School candidates in the WW II era before being sent overseas or for more training at other bases.

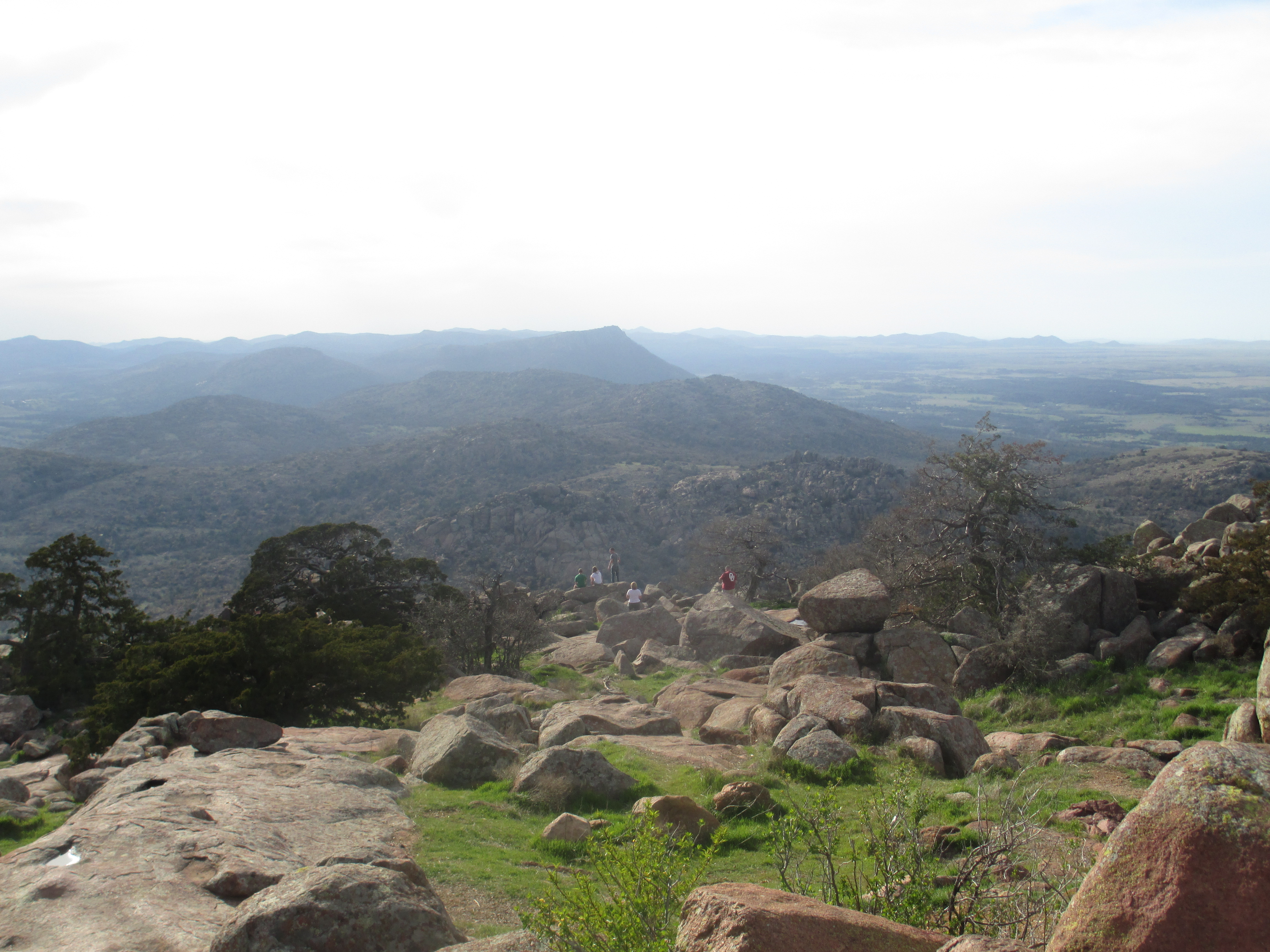
View from Mount Scott

There is some disagreement as to whether Mount Scott is the highest mountain in the WMWR. The Oklahoma Historical Society states flatly that Mount Scott is the tallest at 2,464’ above sea level, followed by Mount Pinchot at 2,461’. However, the website PeakVisor lists Pinchot as the tallest in the Refuge at 2,467’, conceding only that since Pinchot is closed to the public, Scott at 2,464’ is the highest accessible peak. The website PeakBagger, while listing Scott as 2464.76’, goes so far as to give Pinchot's height as 2476.48’. So Scott is one of the two tallest mountains in the WMWR, if not the very tallest, and is certainly the tallest accessible mountain. The 3+ mile paved road that winds from the base to the top of Mount Scott offers breath-taking views of the surrounding Oklahoma plains. From the west side of Mount Scott, several prominent mountains can be seen to the west including Elk Mountain, Mount Sheridan, and an officially-unnamed mountain sometimes called Haley Peak which lies just outside the NW corner of the WMWR. Haley Peak is the highest point in the Wichita Mountain range.

The Blue Canyon Wind Farm is north of Mount Scott, and the wind turbines are visible from the access road.

== Routes ==
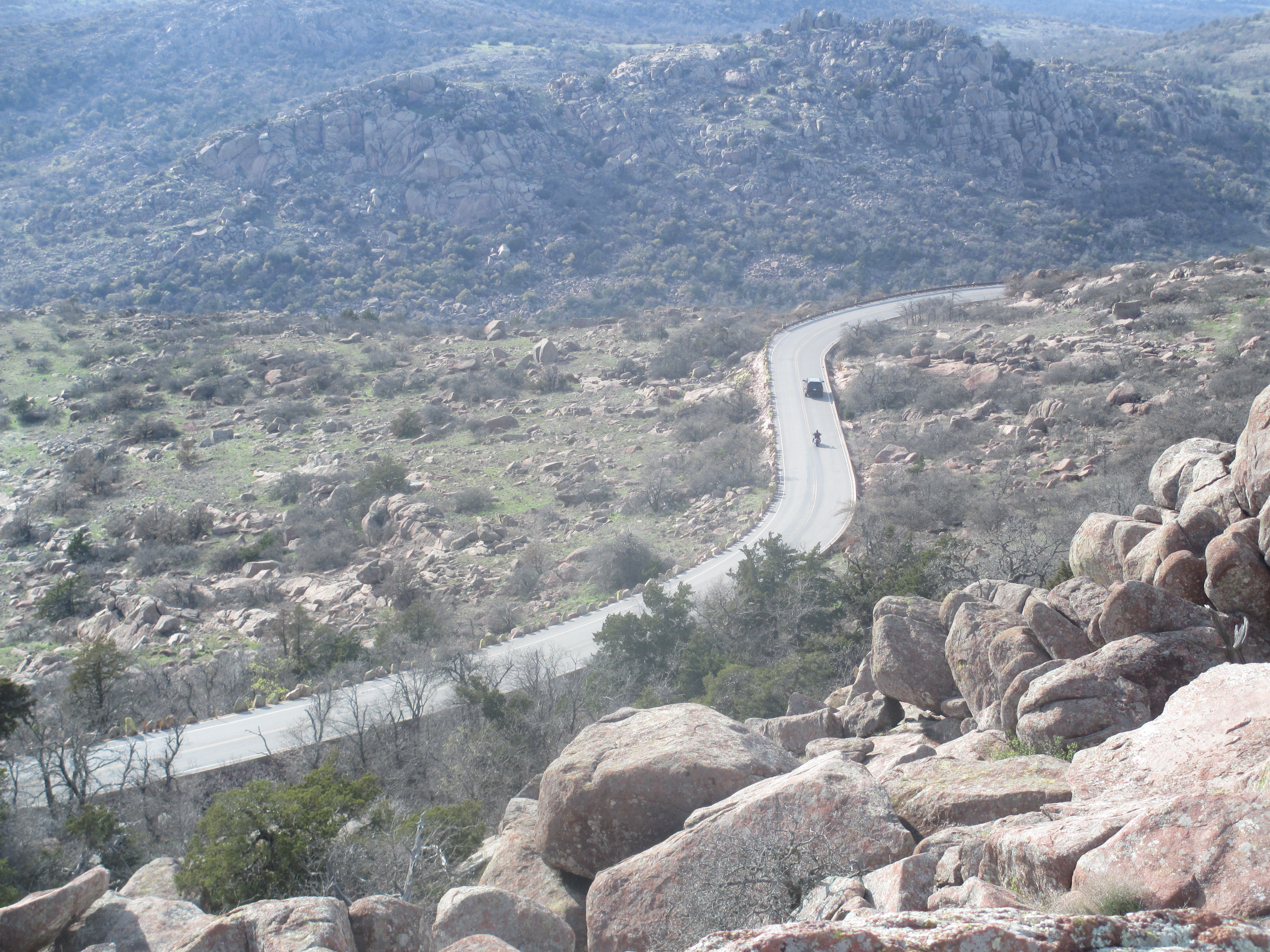
The winding highway as seen from the top of Mount Scott

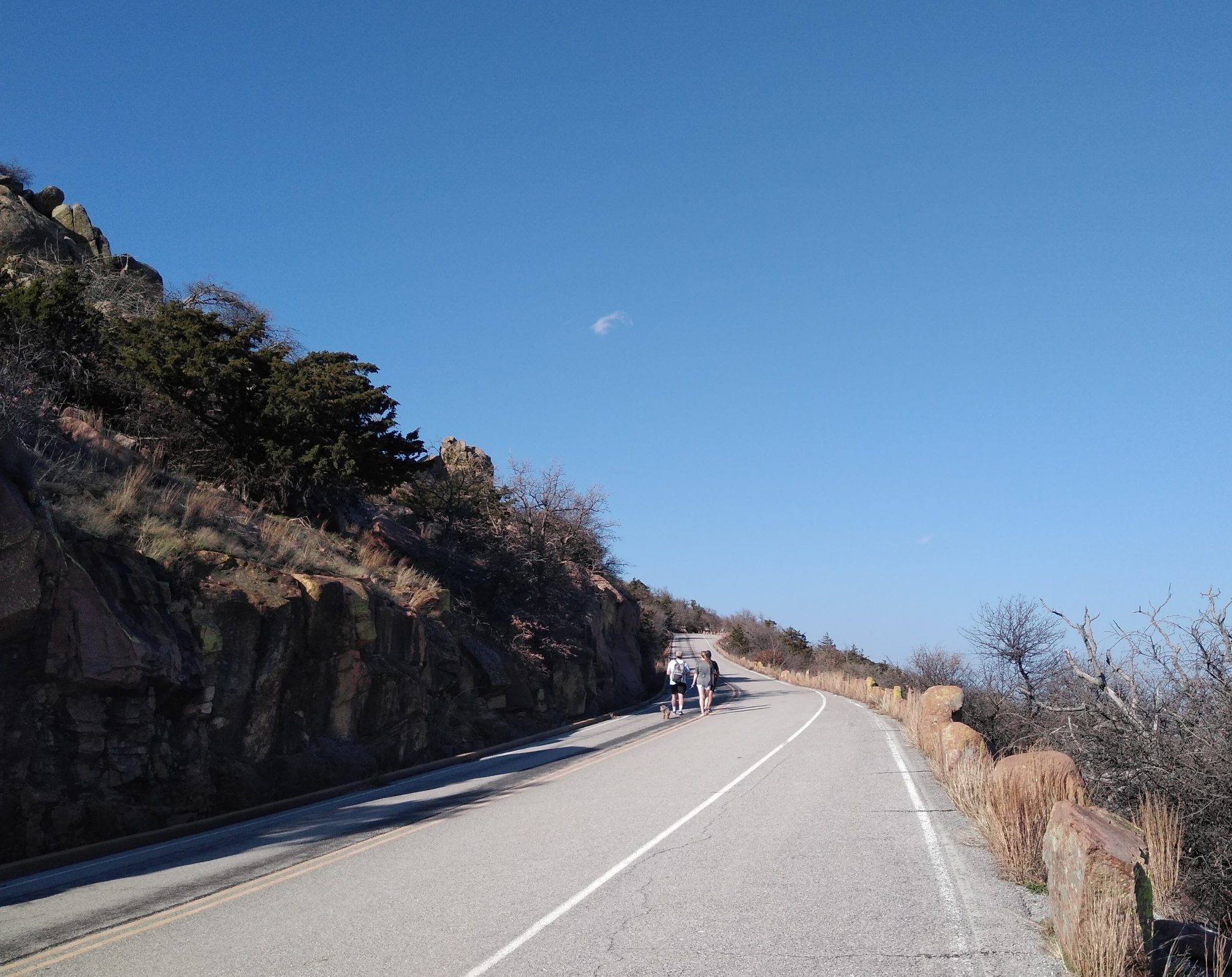
Road up Mount Scott

The summit is accessible by a three-mile paved road which winds around the mountain. Several scenic pullouts are located along the road, and parking is available at the top of the mountain. Bicyclists and pedestrians are allowed on the road to the summit from sunrise to sunset. Although the distance is fairly short, the route is not recommended for beginners due to the steep grades, heavy crosswinds, and sharp turns.

The peak may also be reached by traditional hiking, though there are no blazed trails to the summit, and large pedestrian groups (of over 8 people) are prohibited on the paved road. However, visitors are allowed to park at the base of the mountain and hike to a number of the rock climbing areas available on the mountain.
