= Mount Pinchot (Oklahoma) =

Mountain in Oklahoma, United States

- Location within Oklahoma

Highest point
- Elevation: 2,476 ft (755 m)
- Coordinates: 34°47′58″N 98°46′21″W

Geography
- Location: Comanche County, Oklahoma, U.S.
- Parent range: Wichita Mountains
- Topo map: USGS

Geology
- Rock age: Cambrian Period
- Mountain type: Igneous

Mount Pinchot is a peak in the Wichita Mountains Wildlife Refuge of Southwest Oklahoma. It is located toward the western edge of the WMWR. The US Fish and Wildlife Service is responsible for the maintenance of the area. Mount Pinchot is located within the Wildlife Refuge's Special Use Area and is closed to the public. Special wildlife viewing tours are offered by the Refuge which take participants very near the base of the mountain. Mount Pinchot was named in honor of Gifford Pinchot who served as the first Chief of the United States Forest Service.

Sources differ as to Pinchot's exact height, and whether it is the tallest in the Refuge. The Oklahoma Historical Society states flatly that Mount Scott is the tallest in the Refuge at 2,464’ above sea level, followed by Pinchot at 2,461’. The United States Geological Survey (USGS) page on Pinchot agrees with the 2,461’ figure. However, the website PeakVisor lists Pinchot as the tallest in the Refuge at 2,467’, conceding only that since Pinchot is closed to the public, Scott at 2,464’ is the highest accessible peak. The website PeakBagger, while listing Scott as 2464.76’, goes so far as to give Pinchot's height as 2476.48’. So Pinchot is between 2,461’ and 2,476.48’, and is one of the two tallest mountains in the Refuge, if not the very tallest.

The highest peak in the Wichita Mountains (including areas outside the Refuge) is the officially-unnamed but sometimes called Haley Peak, at 2,481 ft (756 m). It is located on private property just outside the NW corner of the Refuge. [Haley Peak Elevation information from records stored at USGS/NSDI Standards Team/NGTOC III/Mid-Continent Mapping Center/Rolla MO.]
