= Wichita Mountains Wildlife Refuge =

Protected mixed grass prairie on Oklahoma

- IUCN category IV (habitat/species management area)
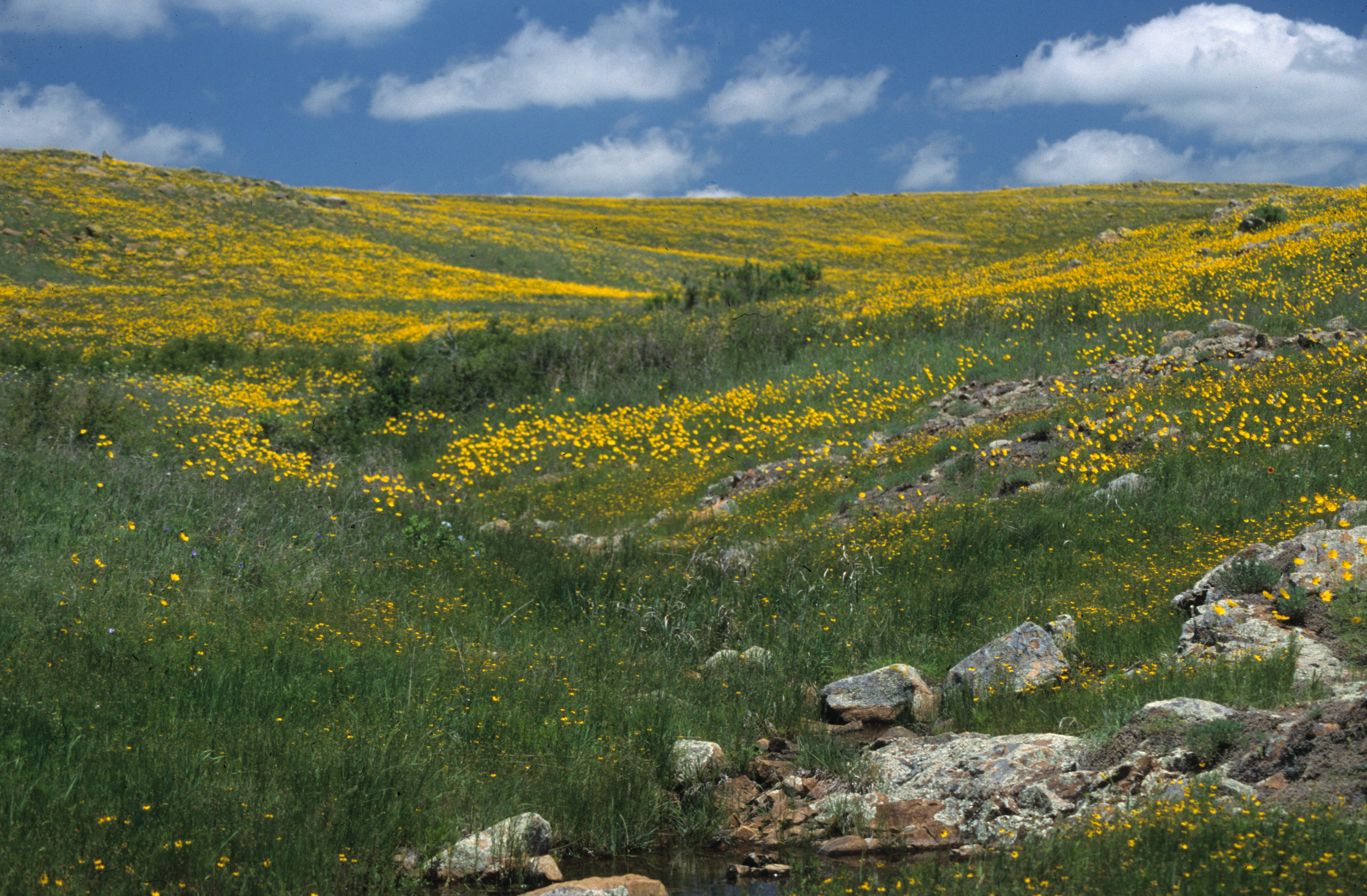
- Spring wildflowers in the refuge

- Location within the United States Location within Oklahoma
- Location: Comanche County, Oklahoma, United States
- Nearest city: Meers
- Coordinates: 34°46′N 98°42′W
- Area: 59,020 acres (238.8 km^{2})
- Established: 1901
- Governing body: United States Fish and Wildlife Service
- Website: Wichita Mountains Wildlife Refuge

A granite-walled canyon in the Wichita Mountains National Wildlife Refuge, photographed in 2026.

Wichita Mountains Wildlife Refuge, located in southwestern Oklahoma near Lawton, has protected unique wildlife habitats since 1901 and is the oldest managed wildlife facility in the United States Fish and Wildlife Service system. The refuge's location in the geologically unique Wichita Mountains and its areas of undisturbed mixed grass prairie make it an important conservation area. The Wichita Mountains are approximately 500 million years old. Measuring about 59,020 acres (238.8 km^{2}), the refuge hosts a great diversity of species: 806 plant species, 240 species of birds, 36 fish, and 64 reptiles and amphibians are present.

== History ==
The Wichita Forest Reserve was established by the United States General Land Office in Oklahoma on July 4, 1901, with 57,120 acres (231.2 km^{2}). After the transfer of federal forests to the U.S. Forest Service in 1905, it became a National Forest on March 4, 1907, as Wichita National Forest.

On June 4, 1936, the Wichita Forest designation was abolished and transferred to the Bureau of Biological Survey, a precursor to the Fish and Wildlife Service. It was re-designated the Wichita Mountains Wildlife Refuge (WMWR).

Presidential Proclamations for Forest Reserve Designation

Calendar Date	Proclamation No.	Proclamation Title	U.S. President
July 4, 1901	459	Wichita Forest Reserve Establishment	William McKinley
June 2, 1905	563	Wichita Forest Reserve Redesignation	Theodore Roosevelt
May 29, 1906	628	Wichita Forest Reserve Boundary	Theodore Roosevelt
October 13, 1910	1096	Wichita National Forest Boundary	William Taft
November 27, 1936	2211	Wichita National Forest, Oklahoma	Franklin Roosevelt

United States Statutes for Land Preservation

Enactment Date	Public Law	U.S. Statute	Bill No.	U.S. President
January 24, 1905	P.L. 58-23	33 Stat. 614	H.R. 11584	Theodore Roosevelt
June 8, 1906	P.L. 59-209	34 Stat. 225	S. 4698	Theodore Roosevelt
March 4, 1907	P.L. 59-242	34 Stat. 1269	H.R. 24815	Theodore Roosevelt
June 4, 1936	P.L. 74-637	49 Stat. 1446	H.R. 11418	Franklin Roosevelt
October 23, 1970	P.L. 91-504	84 Stat. 1104	H.R. 17507	Richard M. Nixon

== Description ==
The WMWR is managed by the U.S. Fish and Wildlife Service. There are 13 small lakes within the reserve.

Two segments covering about 15% of the refuge is designated as a wilderness area.

== Fauna ==
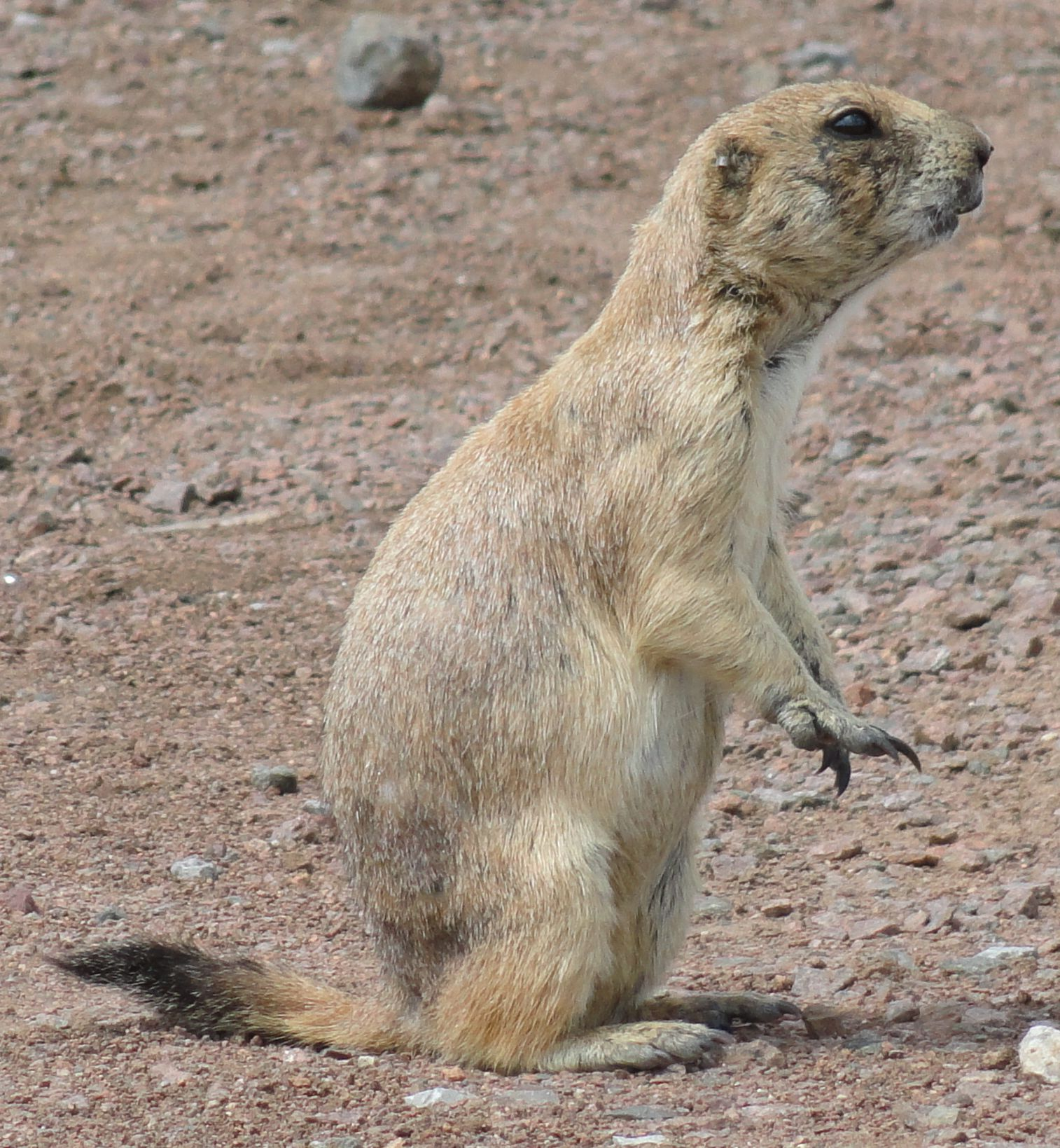
Black-tailed prairie dog

According to the U. S. Fish & Wildlife Service, 240 species of birds, 50 species of mammals, 64 species of reptiles and amphibians, and 36 species of fish have been documented.

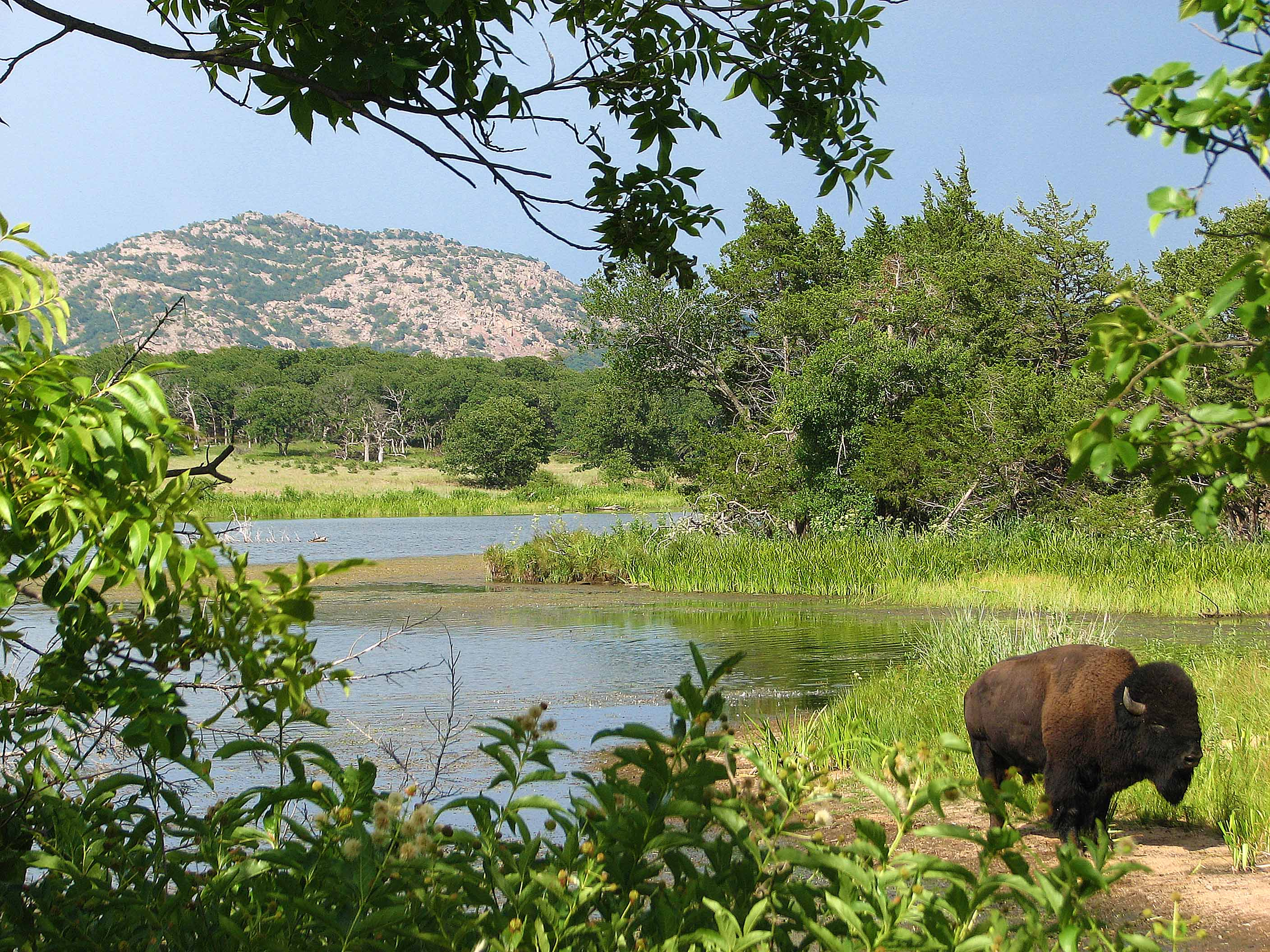
Bison with vegetation around French Lake

Several species of large native mammals make their home at the refuge: plains bison, also known as the American bison, elk, white-tailed deer graze the prairies along with Texas longhorn cattle preserved for their cultural and historic importance. Bison, longhorns, and elk were introduced after the establishment of the refuge. Merriam's elk, the original subspecies of elk in this area, is extinct, so the elk in the refuge are Rocky Mountain elk. The ancestors of the herd were imported from Jackson Hole, Wyoming in 1911. The elk herd is the largest in Oklahoma at about 1,000 and the white tailed deer number about 450. These ungulates are no longer considered endangered. Many smaller mammal species also live in the refuge, including the Mexican long-nosed armadillo, bassarisk, and the black-tailed prairie dog. Other species that have been reintroduced include the river otter, burrowing owls and the prairie dog. Although these species were not listed as "endangered", USFWS policy is to assure that species that once were native to these mountains would always be found there. According to the Encyclopedia of Oklahoma History and Culture, the refuge failed in its attempt to reintroduce the American pronghorn antelope, bighorn sheep, and the prairie chicken.

The conservation of bison has become an ongoing, diverse effort, and the refuge was important in saving the American buffalo from extinction. In 1907 the American Bison Society transported 15 bison, six bulls and nine cows, from the Bronx Zoo. On arrival, the Comanche leader Quanah Parker and a host of other Indians and whites turned out to welcome the bison. At that time, bison had been extinct on the southern Great Plains for 30 years. The bison herd now numbers about 650 on the refuge. In fall, bison in excess of the carrying capacity of the refuge were auctioned off but this practice was ended in 2020 when the refuge joined in the Bison Conservation Initiative. The 2020 Bison Conservation Initiative by the Department of the Interior has five central goals: wild, healthy bison herds; genetic conservation; shared stewardship; ecological restoration; and cultural restoration. It strengthened mechanisms for delivery of bison to Native American tribes from federal herds. In 1973, the refuge aided bison conservation by donating three bison to the Fort Worth Nature Center and Refuge.

The refuge is home to many species of birds, and it is one of the remaining homes of the recently delisted black-capped vireo.

== Flora ==
The refuge is ecologically diverse, with prairie, ravine, and mountain plant communities. The many exposed granite boulders make exceptional habitat for a chartreuse green lichen known as Pleopsidium flavum. Portions of the refuge contain scrubby forest of mixed oak varieties. A disjunct population of bigtooth maple is found here, 400 miles (640 km) from the nearest natural population in West Texas.

== Landscape ==
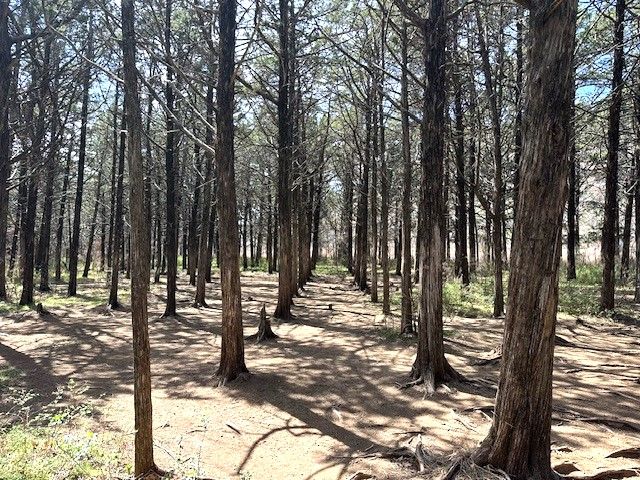
Parallel Forest in the Wichita Mountains Wildlife Refuge, 3-2025

The Wichita Mountains, named after the tribe that inhabited the area centuries ago, were uplifted between 290 and 330 million years ago. The highest accessible peak which is located within the reserve is Mount Scott at 2,464 ft (751 m). (Note: There is some disagreement as to whether Mount Scott is the highest mountain in the WMWR, or merely the highest accessible mountain. See the Mount Scott or the Mount Pinchot page for more information.) The summit is drivable by means of a 3-mile-long road, and offers views of the surrounding landscape.

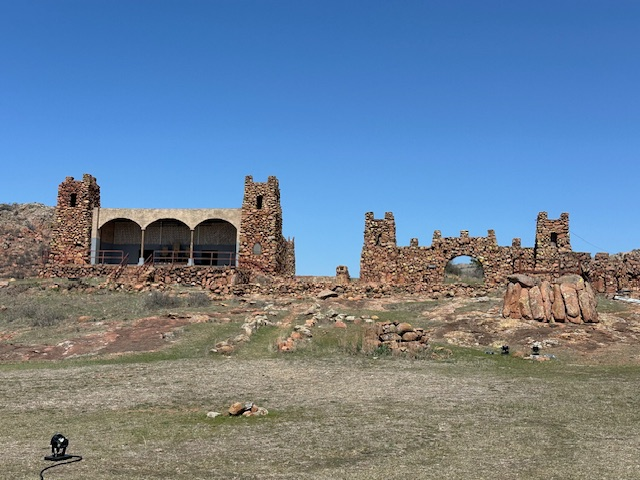
Holy City of the Wichitas, WMWR, 3-2025

Man-made additions to the landscape include the Parallel Forest, consisting of large cedars planted in the early 1900s in rows exactly 6 feet apart.

Also located within the reserve is the Holy City of the Wichitas, a 66-acre NRHP-listed site containing full-sized buildings dating from the 1930s but made to look like Israel in biblical times, still regularly used for the nation's longest-running annual Easter passion play.

== Recreation ==
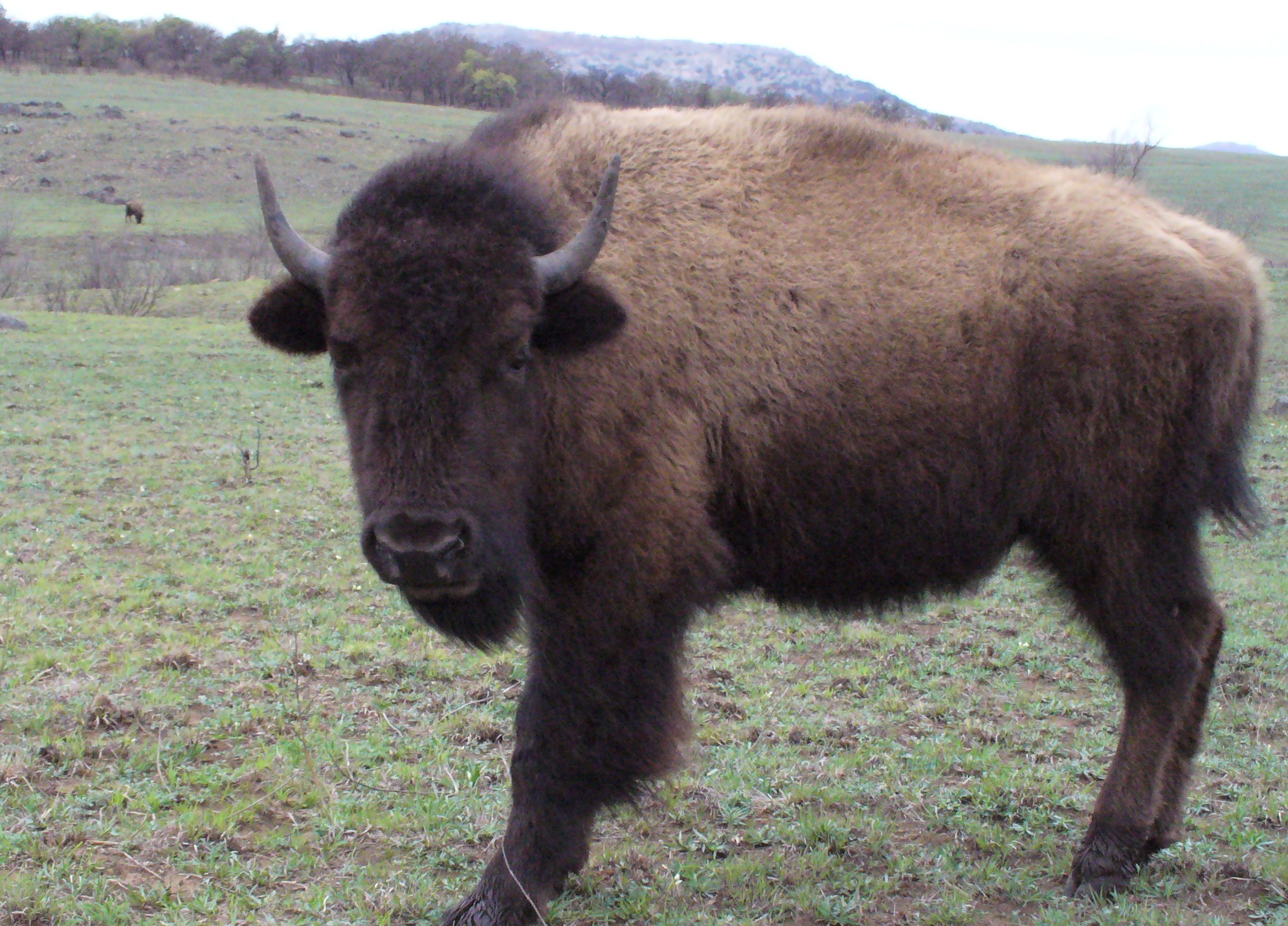
Bison calf, WMWR

There is no admission charge. Public use areas on the refuge total 22,400 acres (9,100 ha). The remaining 37,000-acre wildlife area (15,000 ha) is protected wildlife habitat only. A visitor center and bookstore displays art and has exhibits illustrating the four major habitats found on the refuge: Rocklands, Aquatic, Mixed-Grass Prairie, and Cross Timbers.

The refuge is a popular destination for recreational activities. Rock climbing is overwhelmingly popular, but visitors also enjoy hiking, camping, fishing, bird and wildlife watching, and photography. The refuge has an extensive trail system, including about 15 miles of official trails. The area became popular for rock climbing beginning in the 1960s and 1970s, and has become something of a regional mecca. Though climbing has brought many visitors to the refuge, some controversy exists over the use of fixed anchors, bolts and other permanently placed objects on the rock face. The refuge has joined with The Access Fund and the Wichita Mountains Climbers Coalition to promote responsible use of the Wichitas' resources. Rock climbing routes are found on Mt. Scott, the refuge's second highest summit, as well as areas such as the Narrows and the Charon's Garden Wilderness Area.

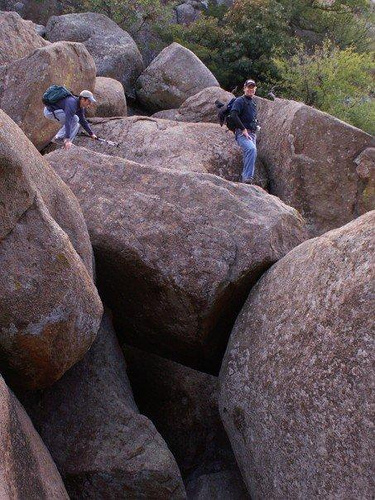
Hikers in Charon's Garden

The Charon's Garden Wilderness Area is dominated by rugged granite mountains, oak forests, and mixed grass prairies, covers 5,723 acres (23.16 km^{2}) in the western portion of the Refuge. It is not unusual to run into deer, buffalo, elk, longhorn, and prairie dogs. Day use and limited backcountry camping is allowed with a permit from the Refuge. The area is popular with rock climbers, with formations such as Echo Dome and Crab Eyes being popular destinations.

Fishing for largemouth bass, sunfish, crappie, and channel catfish is popular in the thirteen artificial lakes on the refuge. Elk and deer hunting, to cull excessive numbers, is permitted in a managed hunt every fall. Hunters are chosen by lottery and a fee is charged. A narrow winding road leads to the summit of Mount Scott, elevation 2,464 feet (751m), with a view that encompasses the whole refuge. Although the mountains rise only 800 to 1000 feet above the surrounding prairie, they are steep and rocky.

== Climate ==
Climate data for Wichita MTN WL REF, Oklahoma. (Elevation 1,665ft)
Month	Jan	Feb	Mar	Apr	May	Jun	Jul	Aug	Sep	Oct	Nov	Dec	Year
Record high °F (°C)	87 (31)	89 (32)	97 (36)	99 (37)	107 (42)	111 (44)	112 (44)	112 (44)	111 (44)	101 (38)	90 (32)	85 (29)	112 (44)
Mean daily maximum °F (°C)	51.3 (10.7)	56.1 (13.4)	64.8 (18.2)	74.2 (23.4)	81.0 (27.2)	89.2 (31.8)	94.6 (34.8)	94.5 (34.7)	86.3 (30.2)	75.7 (24.3)	62.7 (17.1)	52.5 (11.4)	73.6 (23.1)
Mean daily minimum °F (°C)	25.3 (−3.7)	29.3 (−1.5)	36.8 (2.7)	46.9 (8.3)	55.9 (13.3)	64.8 (18.2)	68.8 (20.4)	68.0 (20.0)	60.1 (15.6)	48.7 (9.3)	36.4 (2.4)	27.7 (−2.4)	47.4 (8.6)
Record low °F (°C)	−16 (−27)	−11 (−24)	−6 (−21)	18 (−8)	29 (−2)	39 (4)	46 (8)	39 (4)	32 (0)	17 (−8)	6 (−14)	−12 (−24)	−16 (−27)
Average precipitation inches (mm)	1.19 (30)	1.39 (35)	2.08 (53)	2.85 (72)	4.71 (120)	3.84 (98)	2.56 (65)	2.73 (69)	3.34 (85)	3.04 (77)	1.78 (45)	1.44 (37)	30.94 (786)
Average snowfall inches (cm)	1.4 (3.6)	1.2 (3.0)	0.7 (1.8)	0.1 (0.25)	0 (0)	0 (0)	0 (0)	0 (0)	0 (0)	0 (0)	0.1 (0.25)	0.9 (2.3)	4.5 (11)
Source: The Western Regional Climate Center
