= History of Lawton, Oklahoma =

The history of Lawton, Oklahoma, starts with opening of American Indian reservation lands in the early 1900s and has seen population and economic growth throughout the 20th century due to its proximity to Fort Sill, a United States Army post.

== Establishment through World War II ==
Southwest Oklahoma was the home for many Native American tribes due to the natural resources provided by the nearby 60,000-acre (240 km^{2}) outcropping of ancient granite now called the Wichita Mountains, with water, wildlife, vegetation, in abundance. This area is now the Wichita Mountains Wildlife Refuge, a U.S. Fish and Wildlife Service Refuge. Lawton's history is inextricably tied to Fort Sill, established in 1869 during the hostilities in the Indian Territory.

This land was granted to the Comanche, Kiowa, and Apache tribes by the Medicine Lodge Treaty of 1867, which continued warring against the military until Comanche Chief Quanah Parker and his Quohada Comanches abandoned the struggle and arrived at Fort Sill in June 1875.

In 1891 the United States Congress appointed a commission under David H. Jerome to meet with the tribal leaders and come to an agreement allowing white settlement. Under pressure from the commission, Quanah Parker and the other Native American tribal leaders initially agreed to give the government control of the lands for $1.25 per acre. Each tribal member would receive a 160-acre (0.65 km^{2}) allotment, with 400,000 acres (1,600 km^{2}) reserved for grazing land for white cattle ranchers. After years of controversy and legal maneuvering on both sides, President William McKinley issued a proclamation which gave the government control over 2,000,000 acres (8,100 km^{2}) for less than $1 per acre.

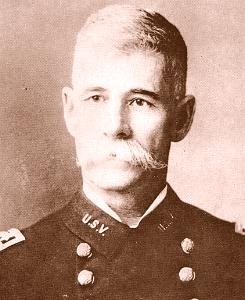
Major-General Henry Ware Lawton

Upon completion of a survey, three 320-acre (1.3 km^{2}) sites were designated as the town sites for the county seats for the Kiowa, Caddo, and Comanche Counties. Lawton was the Comanche County site, named for General Henry W. Lawton, who had been quartermaster at Fort Sill and part of the pursuit and capture of Geronimo. The Apache leader was moved with Chiricahua prisoners of war to Fort Sill in 1894, under the direction of Captain H.L. Scott. Geronimo was jailed at the Old Post Guardhouse, and he remained in the area until his death on February 17, 1909.

Few American cities have sprung up overnight. The five land runs in Indian Territory from 1889 to 1895 led to violence, fraud, and legal disputes. It was decided to open El Reno and Lawton with lotteries. On July 10, 1901, a lottery began in El Reno, Oklahoma and Fort Sill to determine the order for filing the homestead claims with 29,888 potential homesteaders filed claims at the Fort Sill land office.

The town itself was divided into 66 blocks, to be sold at auction. Two of the original homestead claims directly south of the 320 acres (1.3 km^{2}) for Lawton were filed by James Woods and Martha Helen Beal, known as the Woods Addition and Beal Addition to the original Lawton plat.

Heck Thomas Lawton's first Chief of Police

On August 6, 1901, the auction of town lots began, ending sixty days later. A tent city had grown up in anticipation of the auction, and banks, saloons, stores and other service industries sprang up overnight. Within one year, there were 100 saloons. Gambling was epidemic. In 1902 deputy US marshal, Heck Thomas, was sent to settle things down and was elected as Lawton's first chief of police, a position that he held for seven years until his health began to fail. Gambling remained legal until outlawed on Nov 16, 1907, coincident with the establishment of the State of Oklahoma.

The Rock Island Railroad expanded, rolling into Lawton on September 25, 1901, joined soon thereafter by the Frisco Line. There was also a city streetcar line that ran through downtown Lawton and several residential areas until the 1940s. Following the advent of the automobile, early Transcontinental Automobile Routes from 1916 to 1925 intersected Lawton. These early auto trails included the Bankhead Highway, Dallas-Canadian-Denver route, Southwast Trail Highway, Lee Highway, Ozark Trail, Indian Trail, Williams Highway and the Stapleton Road. In 1926, state highways were designated in all directions from Lawton initially including State highways 8 and 36 north and south (later U.S. 277 and 281), and State Highway 7 east and west (S.H. 7 still designated east of Lawton while same highway to the west of the city was co-designated U.S. 62 and S.H. 7 for many years but solely as U.S. 62 in recent years. S.H. 7 was entirely paved east of Lawton 24 miles to U.S. 81 at Lawton-Duncan "Y" north of Duncan by 1929, while U.S. 62 and 277 was paved north 7 miles through Fort Sill to near Medicine Park Y with S.H. 49 by 1930. By the late 1930s, Lawton was connected by completely paved highways to Oklahoma City via U.S. 62 and 277, U.S. 62 west to Altus on into the Texas Panhandle, and U.S. 277-281 south to Wichita Falls, Texas.

The influx and rapid population expansion led to a series of public health crises, water shortage, and lawlessness. The first city elections were held October 24, 1901, and Leslie Price Ross was elected mayor, with voting restricted to the few who had resided in the area for over a year. One of the original two newspapers, the Lawton Daily Democrat, became the forerunner of the Lawton Constitution, which was established in 1911. In 1949, the Lawton Constitution acquired the Morning Press, and today the Constitution publishes only a morning edition that serves all of Southwest Oklahoma.

The history of the Bethlehem Baptist Church is a long and glorious one, spanning over a century and numerous generations. The early pioneers were faced with a myriad of hardships. They were enclosed with segregation where political rights were not for every man, and where few lines of communication existed between the races. But despite all these difficulties, the courage and faith in God by the founders and pioneers in the years past have helped to develop the foundation for the generations.

The idea of a Baptist church in the Black Community of Lawton, Oklahoma was conceived in the minds of the founders and organized in 1901 by William Scott Sr., C.D. Dewberry, George Williams, and William Garrett, G.W. Woods, Katie Garrett, Harvey C. Pride, and their families, in a barbershop. The church has been led by 19 pastors with the late Pastor Emeritus; Reverend O.B. Davis served 32 years (1950-1982).

During the early years, most of the churches in Lawton were housed in tents, and few in small frame buildings. Bethlehem was one of the few that were in a small frame like structure (a shed type), which stood at the corner of First and “F” street. In 1907, the church purchased a lot at the corner of First and Gore and worshiped there, which was later sold to the Public Service Electric Company. The site at First and Arlington was purchased and the late Deacon J.S. Phillip created the edifice in 1939. In 2010, the original Bethlehem Baptist Church building at the corner of 1st and Arlington was torn down to make way for the downtown revitalization.

The First Presbyterian Church of Lawton, at 8th Street and D Avenue, was constructed in 1902, and remains the oldest public structure remaining in Lawton. It is listed on the National Register of Historic Places. On January 2, 1902, four public schools opened. The first class of six graduated in 1903 from Lawton High School. Cameron State Agricultural School (now Cameron University) convened on November 16, 1909, in the basement of the First National Bank. In March 1911 classes were transferred to the current location on West Gore. The Mattie Beal House at Fifth and Summit was built in 1908, and is listed on the National Register of Historic Places.

The United States entry into World War I accelerated growth at Fort Sill and Lawton. The availability of five million gallons of water from Lake Lawtonka, just north of Fort Sill, provided the impetus for the War Department to establish a major cantonment named Camp Doniphan, active until 1922. In 1911, The School of Fire for the Field Artillery was opened at Fort Sill and it continues to operate today as the U.S. Army Field Artillery School.

From the stock market crash of October 1929, through the end of the 1930s, residual dust from storms located further north and west, severe winter weather, unemployment and poverty created severe economic challenges for Lawtonians. The decision at the end of 1930 to permanently locate the U.S. Army Field School at Fort Sill ended 20 years of indecision and kicked off a round of construction. Fort Sill commanders played a vital role in the implementation of Civilian Conservation Corps and Works Progress Administration projects throughout the 1930s. Some of the major projects included work on dams and buildings at the Wichita Mountains Wildlife Refuge, the County Courthouse, Roosevelt Stadium (Now called Ron Stephens Stadium), the road to the summit of Mount Scott, and the Holy City of the Wichitas, among others.

== Post-World War II Lawton (1946–1959) ==
Following World War II, Lawton enjoyed rapid and steady population growth. From 1930 to 1940, population increased from 18,055 to 34,757, and by 1960, it reached 61,697. In the 1950s, significant public facilities were built, including the new Lawton High School (1954), Tomlinson Junior High School (1957), Comanche County Memorial Hospital (1951), several elementary schools, Lawton Municipal Airport (1955), McMahon Auditorium (1955), National Guard Armory (1955), and groundbreaking for the Museum of the Great Plains (1959). The decade also saw the opening of the Hotel Lawtonian in the downtown area in 1955, which was owned by the city for many years and served as an apartment building. It has been shut down as a condemned space. And the city's growth in population and land area continued with new residential areas developing in the western, northwestern and southeastern portions of the city, reaching as far west as 52nd Street and east to 45th Street by 1959.

Lawton's television station, KSWO-TV Channel 7, signed on the air in March, 1953 as an ABC affiliate almost simultaneous with the debut of two TV stations just across the Red River in Wichita Falls, Texas including KFDX-TV Channel 3 (NBC) and KWFT-TV (now KAUZ-TV) Channel 6 (CBS), which meant that Lawton and surrounding areas of Southwest Oklahoma and North Texas were among the few in the nation at that time to have access to three TV stations with full affiliations with their respective networks - the Dallas-Fort Worth metroplex was the nearest TV market from Lawton and Wichita Falls to have a similar setup at the time.

Lawton's tremendous growth during the late 1940s and 1950s led city leaders to seek out additional water sources to supplement existing water from Lake Lawtonka at the foot of Mount Scott near Medicine Park. In the late 1950s, the city purchased large parcels of land along East Cache Creek in northern Comanche County for the construction of a man-made lake with a dam built in 1959 on the creek just north of U.S. 277 west of Elgin. Lake Ellsworth, named for a former Lawton mayor and soft-drink bottler C.R. Ellsworth, was dedicated in the early 1960s and not only offered additional water resources, but also recreational opportunities and flood control along Cache Creek, which had been prone to flooding following heavy rains further downstream to the east of Lawton southward to near Walters in Cotton County.

== The 1960s ==
The 1960s saw the construction of Eisenhower (1962) and MacArthur (1969) high schools, Eisenhower Junior High School (1967) and several elementary school campuses; along with several shopping centers including Cache Road Square at 38th and Cache Road in 1961, a new location for Montgomery Ward at Sheridan and Gore (opened 1966) that replaced the older downtown store on D Avenue. Fort Sill also experienced tremendous growth during the 1960s, much of it due to the escalation of the Vietnam War later in the decade. In 1969, Fort Sill celebrated its centennial with various events and activities held during the calendar year.

The City of Lawton continued to grow considerably in land area as well as population. In 1966, the city annexed several miles of land on the city's east, northeast, west and northwest sections of Lawton to accommodate growing residential and commercial develop in those areas of the city. Prior to that time, aside from development along East Lee Boulevard to residential subdivisions around S.E. 45th Street, the eastern boundary of Lawton was generally in the vicinity of East Cache Creek, which runs north to south about 1½ miles east of downtown Lawton and about 1/4 mile east of present-day Interstate 44. The western boundary of Lawton, which had been in the vicinity of 38th Street during most of the 1950s, moved west two miles to 67th Street by 1961 and in 1966, was a mile further west at 82nd Street.

In addition to construction of new school campuses during this decade, the Lawton Public Schools system made efforts to comply with federal mandates regarding desegregation of schools. Various schools located in predominantly black neighborhoods including Douglass Junior-Senior High School and Dunbar Elementary School were closed with students in those neighborhoods transported by bus from their own neighborhoods to schools in other portions of the city. LPS also moved its general and administrative offices from the Central Junior High School campus (the original Lawton High School) to the Shoemaker Center site on Fort Sill Boulevard just north of the current Lawton High School.

Other developments during the 1960s included the renovation of the former Emerson School building into a new city hall, downtown post office and police station. Cameron University expanded its infrastructure by adding a new football stadium, library, Burch and Howell halls, the Shepler Center dormitories and administration building. The H. E. Bailey Turnpike was opened to traffic in 1964 and the entire 16-mile Pioneer Expressway was finished at the same time through the Lawton/Fort Sill area as the free section of Interstate 44 between the turnpike links north and south of Lawton to Oklahoma City and Wichita Falls, respectively.

Wayne Gilley served as Lawton's mayor for most of this decade, originally elected in 1961. Gilley served as Lawton's mayor until 1989 with the exception of a four-year period from 1971 to 1975 when Don Whitaker served as mayor.

== The 1970s and beyond ==
During the 1970s, Lawton's downtown area was radically transformed due to urban renewal efforts. Those efforts led to the demolition of the greatest majority of buildings within the central business district including many buildings dating back to Lawton's early days in order to build an enclosed shopping mall. Also spearheading urban renewal efforts in Lawton was a desire by many citizens to rid the downtown area of a string of bars, taverns, strip clubs that dominated blocks along C Avenue and 3rd Street. However, many such establishments simply relocated to other locations within the city limits, mostly along a section of Fort Sill Boulevard just south of Fort Sill's Gate 3 locally known as "The Strip."

Following the virtual demolition of most blocks of downtown Lawton by the mid-1970s, construction began on the new Central Mall, an enclosed shopping mall that included Sears, J.C. Penney and Dillard's as anchor stores along with many smaller retail shops, which opened in 1980. The downtown urban renewal project also made possible the construction of a new Lawton Public Library, which was completed in 1973; new facilities for the City National Bank completed in 1976 and a new downtown post office that opened in 1980.

That decade also saw the opening of Great Plains Vo-Tech in 1971, completion of a new Comanche County Courthouse in 1974, expansions of Cameron University, Comanche County Memorial Hospital and Southwestern Hospital, and the acquisition of land west of the city by the Goodyear Tire and Rubber Company, which opened a large tire manufacturing plant in 1979.

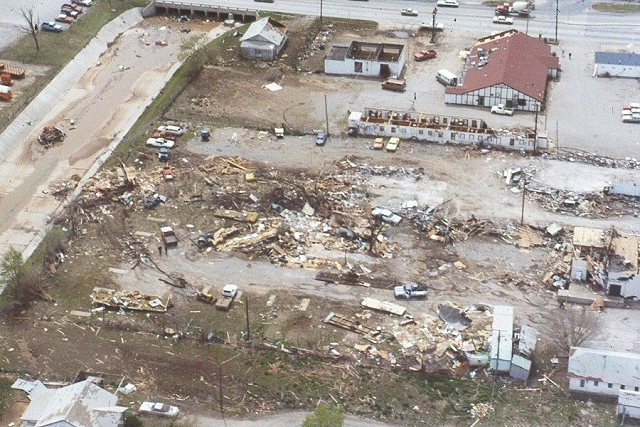
Tornado damage on April 10, 1979

Following the construction of Lake Ellsworth in the early 1960s, city leaders realized that even more water sources would be needed to keep up with Lawton's future needs. In the late 1970s following the construction of Waurika Lake in Cotton, Stephens and Jefferson counties about 40 miles southeast of Lawton on Beaver Creek, the city reached a deal to obtain Waurika Lake water and built a pipeline to transport the supplies between lakes Ellsworth and Waurika.

Lawton was hit by a tornado during the afternoon hours of April 10, 1979, which is locally known as "Terrible Tuesday". This tornado, which was part of that day's Red River Valley Tornado Outbreak, left 3 dead and 109 injured as it tore through the southeastern portion of the city around the vicinity of the intersection of 2nd and Lee Boulevard. Many businesses and residences were heavily damaged or destroyed by the funnel. That same tornado outbreak earlier resulted in 11 deaths, hundreds of injuries and millions of dollars of damage 75 miles to the southwest in Vernon, Texas. Less than two hours after Lawton tornado, an even more destructive tornado occurred 50 miles to the south in Wichita Falls, Texas that left 42 dead, thousands injured and considerably more damage to homes and businesses over a much larger area of that city.

On June 23, 1998, the city was expanded in both size and population when Lawton annexed neighboring Fort Sill. The military installation had been outside the city limits until the passage of Ordinance 98–26.
