= Centenary Methodist Church =

Centenary Methodist Church may refer to:

- Centenary Methodist Episcopal Church, South, St. Louis, MO, listed on the NRHP in Missouri
- Centenary Methodist Church (New Bern, North Carolina), listed on the NRHP in North Carolina
- Centenary Methodist Church (Rowland, North Carolina), listed on the NRHP in North Carolina
- Centenary United Methodist Church (Lawton, Oklahoma), listed on the NHRP in Oklahoma
- Centenary Methodist Church (Charleston, South Carolina), historic 1842 classical architecture church designed by Edward Brickell White
- Centenary United Methodist Church, Richmond, Virginia, listed on the NRHP in Virginia
- Centenary Methodist Church, York, former name of the main Methodist church in York in England
