= General Maddox =

General Maddox may refer to:

- David M. Maddox (1938–2026), U.S. Army four-star general
- Halley G. Maddox (1899–1977), U.S. Army major general
- William J. Maddox Jr (1921–2001), U.S. Army major general

== See also ==
- Sam Maddux Jr. (1915–1990), U.S. Air Force lieutenant general
