= Douglass School (Lawton, Oklahoma) =

School in Lawton, Oklahoma, US (1931–1974)

- U.S. National Register of Historic Places
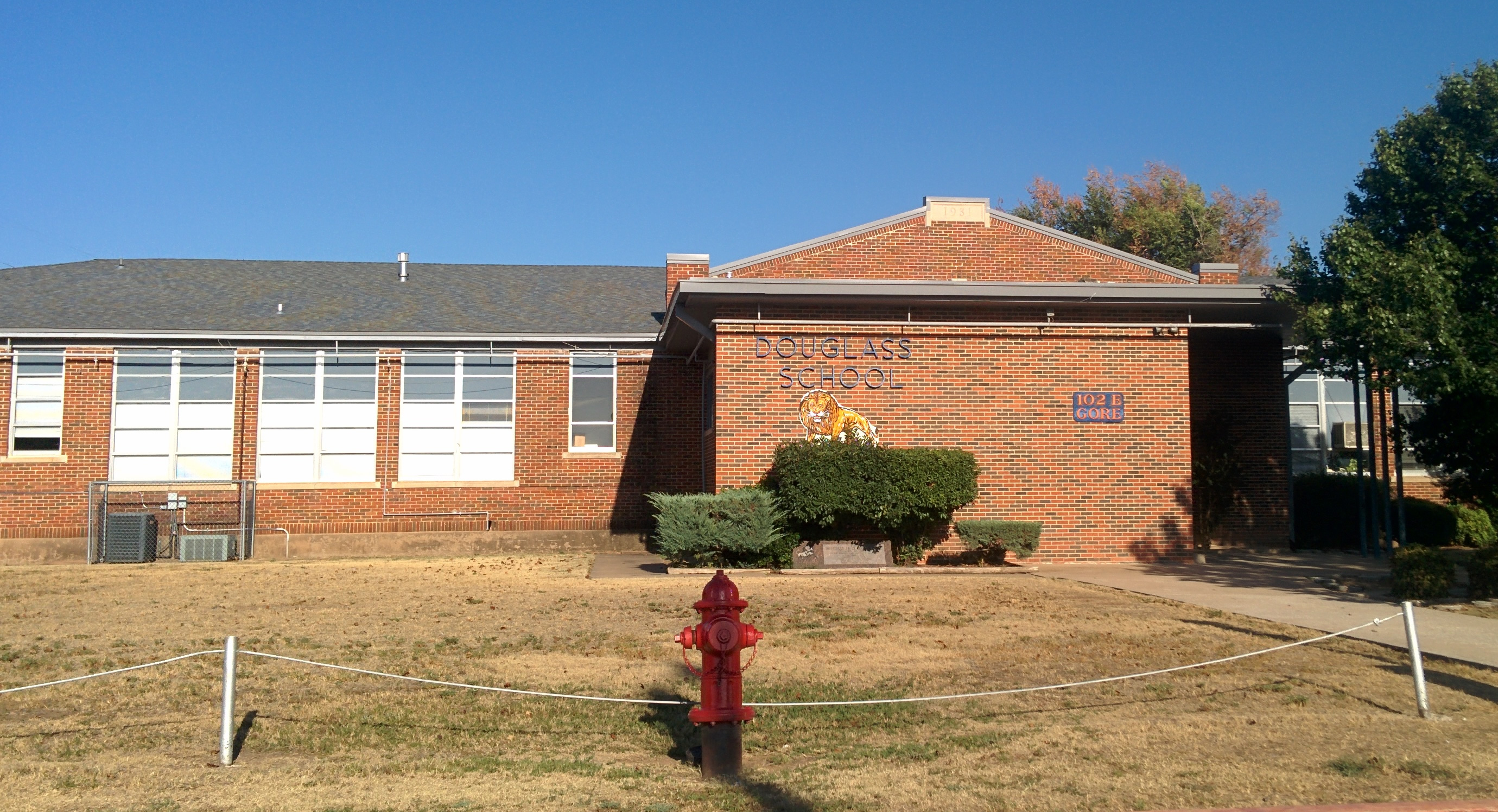

- Location within Oklahoma
- Location: 102 East Gore Blvd., Lawton, Oklahoma, U.S.
- Coordinates: 34°36′34″N 98°23′05″W
- Area: 5 acres (2.0 ha)
- Built: 1931
- Architect: Noftsger and Lawrence
- Architectural style: Late 19th And Early 20th Century American Movements, Modern Movement
- NRHP reference No.: 08001148
- Added to NRHP: November 25, 2008

Douglass School in Lawton, Oklahoma, is a historic building and was a former Rosenwald school for African American students active starting in 1931. The school campus closed in 1974.

It is listed on the National Register of Historic Places since 2008. It is also known as the Lawton Douglass School, Douglass Junior–Senior High School, Douglass Colored School, and Douglass Learning Center.

== Pre-history ==
The Douglass School, then known as "Douglass Colored School" in Lawton was founded in 1907 as a one room school. It was named after the abolitionist Frederick Douglass. In 1929, the Douglass School received accreditation as a high school.

== History ==
In 1930, school district received money from the Rosenwald Fund for a two-room, brick building. The building was completed the following year in 1931. The new school building was used as a separate junior and senior high school with the same name. During the 1930s, the African American population of Lawton almost doubled. Three structure additions were added to the Douglass School to accommodate the population increase, a large gymnasium building was added to the back of the school, with two wings. It is suspected the additions may have been funded, or partially funded by the Public Works Administration (PWA).

In the late 1940s, the United States Army expansion of nearby Fort Sill increased the local population, and four classroom additions were added to the Douglass School.

The African American population of Lawton in 1950 was 3,212 people; and that same year the school district planned to add eight-room addition, with toilets. The school board hired the architectural firm of Noftsger and Lawrence (B. Gaylord Noftsger and William “Martin” Lawrence) of Oklahoma City for the projects. The Noftsger and Lawrence addition was completed in August 1951. By the spring in 1952, the Douglass School was admitted to the North Central Association of Secondary Schools and Colleges.

After Brown v. Board of Education (1954), the U.S. Supreme Court case that outlawed racial segregation, Oklahoma made plans for desegregation of their schools in July 1955. The district claimed desegregation was "completed" by January 1956. By 1966, the remaining Douglass School students were absorbed into other schools within the district, which diminished the loss of the secondary school.

The campus closed as a school by fall of 1974.

== Modern use ==
A school bond passed in 2017, to update the building. The school district has named this campus as the Douglass Learning Center, as well a portion of the facility used for the Lawton Virtual Academy and Gateway Success Center.

== See also ==
- National Register of Historic Places listings in Comanche County, Oklahoma
- List of Rosenwald schools
