= National Register of Historic Places listings in Comanche County, Oklahoma =

Location of Comanche County in Oklahoma

This is a list of the National Register of Historic Places listings in Comanche County, Oklahoma.

This is intended to be a complete list of the properties and districts on the National Register of Historic Places in Comanche County, Oklahoma, United States. The locations of National Register properties and districts for which the latitude and longitude coordinates are included below, may be seen in a map.

There are 37 properties and districts listed on the National Register in the county, including 1 National Historic Landmark.

This National Park Service list is complete through NPS recent listings posted August 28, 2026.

== Current listings ==
	Name on the Register	Image	Date listed	Location	City or town	Description
1	Arrastra Site	Arrastra Site	May 11, 1981 (#81000455)	Cedar Plantation, Wichita Mountains Wildlife Refuge; 34°45′10″N 98°34′34″W	Cache	Spanish-style arrastra from the 19th Century, located next to Cedar Creek, east of the Parallel Forest (Cedar Plantation).
2	Balloon Hangar at Henry Post Army Airfield	Balloon Hangar at Henry Post Army Airfield	November 20, 2015 (#15000826)	5037 Tucker Rd. 34°39′04″N 98°23′53″W	Fort Sill	
3	Mattie Beal House	Mattie Beal House	August 19, 1975 (#75001564)	5th St. and Summit Ave. 34°35′44″N 98°23′41″W	Lawton	
4	Blockhouse on Signal Mountain	Blockhouse on Signal Mountain	November 29, 1978 (#78002228)	Off Mackenzie Hill Rd. 34°40′27″N 98°29′25″W	Fort Sill	An easily identifiable landmark at the peak of Signal Mountain on an active field artillery range. Renowned as "the Mecca for field artillery soldiers".
5	Boulder Cabin	Boulder Cabin	May 11, 1981 (#81000456)	Northwest of Cache, Wichita Mountains Wildlife Refuge; 34°42′06″N 98°40′30″W	Cache	Built as a shelter for hikers. Located at the foot of the hiking trail to the Narrows valley.
6	Buffalo Lodge		May 11, 1981 (#81000457)	Northwest of Cache; 34°44′00″N 98°42′38″W	Cache	
7	Building 309, Fort Sill Indian School	Building 309, Fort Sill Indian School	October 15, 1973 (#73001559)	Eastern edge of Lawton, off U.S. Route 62; 34°37′23″N 98°22′51″W	Lawton	
8	Camp Comanche Site		May 12, 1977 (#77001091)	Address Restricted	Fort Sill	
9	Carnegie Library	Carnegie Library	August 19, 1976 (#76001560)	B Ave. and 5th St. 34°36′24″N 98°23′40″W	Lawton	
10	Central Fire Station	Central Fire Station	September 7, 2016 (#16000618)	623 SW. D Ave. 34°36′15″N 98°23′53″W	Lawton	Still in use by the Lawton Fire Department.
11	Chiefs Knoll	Chiefs Knoll	May 16, 1978 (#78002229)	Macomb and Burrill Rds. 34°40′10″N 98°23′42″W	Fort Sill	Final resting place of several Indian chiefs of the Red River War, including Quanah Parker, Satanta, Satank, and Kicking Bird.
12	Comanche Indian Mission Cemetery	Comanche Indian Mission Cemetery	February 4, 2014 (#12000437)	Henry Post Army Airfield, 4900 Area; 34°38′32″N 98°23′33″W	Fort Sill	
13	Douglass School	Douglass School	November 25, 2008 (#08001148)	102 E. Gore Boulevard; 34°36′35″N 98°23′08″W	Lawton	Closed in 2011 and currently used as a Professional Development Center by the school district.
14	Federal Building and US Courthouse	Federal Building and US Courthouse	March 24, 2000 (#00000243)	410 SW Fifth St. 34°36′11″N 98°23′40″W	Lawton	
15	Ferguson House	Ferguson House	May 11, 1981 (#81000458)	Northwest of Cache on Highway 49, Wichita Mountains Wildlife Refuge. 34°43′00″N 98°36′20″W	Cache	Former residence located within the boundaries of the Wichita Mountains Wildlife Refuge. A fire destroyed much of the interior in 2010. A restoration process begun in 2019 concluded with the placing of a commemorative marker in 2021.
16	First Christian Church	First Christian Church	March 12, 1985 (#85000566)	701 D Ave. 34°36′16″N 98°23′54″W	Lawton	Built in 1929.
17	First Presbyterian Church of Lawton	First Presbyterian Church of Lawton	December 14, 1979 (#79001990)	8th St. and D Ave. 34°36′13″N 98°23′58″W	Lawton	
18	First State Bank of Indiahoma		November 6, 1980 (#80003261)	Main St. 34°37′10″N 98°45′06″W	Indiahoma	Building no longer exists. It was razed sometime around 1981. Banks fittings on display in the Museum of the Great Plains in Lawton.
19	Fort Sill	Fort Sill	October 15, 1966 (#66000629)	U.S. Route 62; 34°40′13″N 98°23′15″W	Fort Sill	
20	General Officers Quarters	General Officers Quarters	April 14, 1975 (#75001563)	1310 Shanklin Circle; 34°40′42″N 98°23′42″W	Fort Sill	
21	Gore Pit District		November 21, 1980 (#80004520)	Straddling Gore Boulevard east of central Lawton; 34°36′29″N 98°22′15″W	Lawton	
22	Holy City of the Wichitas Historic District	Holy City of the Wichitas Historic District	November 21, 2019 (#100004547)	262 Holy City Rd. 34°44′32″N 98°35′28″W	Medicine Park vicinity	Site of the longest running passion play in North America (1926). Permanent sets were built with native granite in the west end of the Wichita Mountains Wildlife Refuge. Includes a chapel and a statue of Christ by Georgio Silva.
23	Indian Cemeteries	Indian Cemeteries	August 10, 1977 (#77001510)	Fort Sill Military Reservation; 34°42′06″N 98°22′09″W	Fort Sill	Includes the Beef Creek Apache Cemetery, final resting place of Geronimo.
24	Ingram House	Ingram House	May 11, 1981 (#81000459)	Northeast of Cache; 34°43′22″N 98°36′09″W	Cache	Former private residence. Now boarded up on the Wichita Mountains Wildlife Refuge.
25	James Carl, Sr., and Lucille Johnson Family House	James Carl, Sr., and Lucille Johnson Family House	March 10, 2025 (#100011494)	202 E. Gore Blvd. 34°36′32″N 98°23′03″W	Lawton	
26	Lawton High School	Lawton High School	February 27, 1997 (#97000197)	809 C Ave. 34°36′21″N 98°24′01″W	Lawton	Lawton High School is no longer at this location. Building now houses city hall.
27	Lawton National Guard Armory	Lawton National Guard Armory	June 5, 2007 (#07000519)	600 Northwest Cache Rd. 34°37′21″N 98°23′51″W	Lawton	
28	Mahoney-Clark House	Mahoney-Clark House	December 8, 1982 (#82001494)	513-515 W. Gore Ave. 34°36′34″N 98°23′46″W	Lawton	
29	Medicine Bluffs	Medicine Bluffs	December 31, 1974 (#74001659)	Medicine Bluff Creek; 34°41′03″N 98°25′00″W	Fort Sill	Shouting "Geronimo" before a jump originates in a legend about the Apache warrior making an impossible jump from the bluffs.
30	Medicine Park Hotel and Annex	Medicine Park Hotel and Annex	September 25, 1979 (#79001991)	E. Lake Dr. 34°43′41″N 98°30′05″W	Medicine Park	Includes the historic Old Plantation restaurant.
31	Meers Mining Camp	Meers Mining Camp	January 20, 1978 (#78002230)	20 miles (32 km) northwest of Lawton; 34°46′57″N 98°34′45″W	Lawton	Former mining town, reduced to a rural neighborhood outside the Wichita Mountains. The Meers Store & Restaurant is still open, and noted for its hamburgers.
32	Methodist Episcopal Church, South	Methodist Episcopal Church, South	March 12, 1985 (#85000567)	702 D Ave. 34°36′14″N 98°23′54″W	Lawton	
33	Old Tower Two	Old Tower Two	December 31, 1974 (#74001660)	Northwest of Lawton at the junction of Signal Mountain and Tower Two Rds. 34°40′24″N 98°26′48″W	Fort Sill	Old observation tower used by Field Artillerymen on Fort Sill from 1911-1918.
34	Quanah Parker Star House	Quanah Parker Star House	September 29, 1970 (#70000532)	Eagle Park; 34°37′42″N 98°38′34″W	Cache	Former home of Comanche Chief Quanah Parker. Moved from its original location, it now resides on the side of the long-closed Eagle Park, and is open only by appointment.
35	Penateka	Penateka	November 7, 1976 (#76001559)	3.5 miles west of Elgin on U.S. Route 277; 34°46′48″N 98°22′09″W	Elgin	
36	Henry Post Air Field	Henry Post Air Field	January 30, 1978 (#78002231)	North of Lawton on Fort Sill; 34°38′40″N 98°23′47″W	Fort Sill	
37	Sunset-Vogue-Blue Ribbon Apartments Historic District	Sunset-Vogue-Blue Ribbon Apartments Historic District	December 17, 2018 (#100003236)	NW Williams & Hoover Aves, NW 23rd & 22nd Sts. 34°38′00″N 98°25′35″W	Lawton	

== See also ==
- List of National Historic Landmarks in Oklahoma
- National Register of Historic Places listings in Oklahoma
