= Robert S. Johnson =

American World War II flying ace

Robert Samuel Johnson
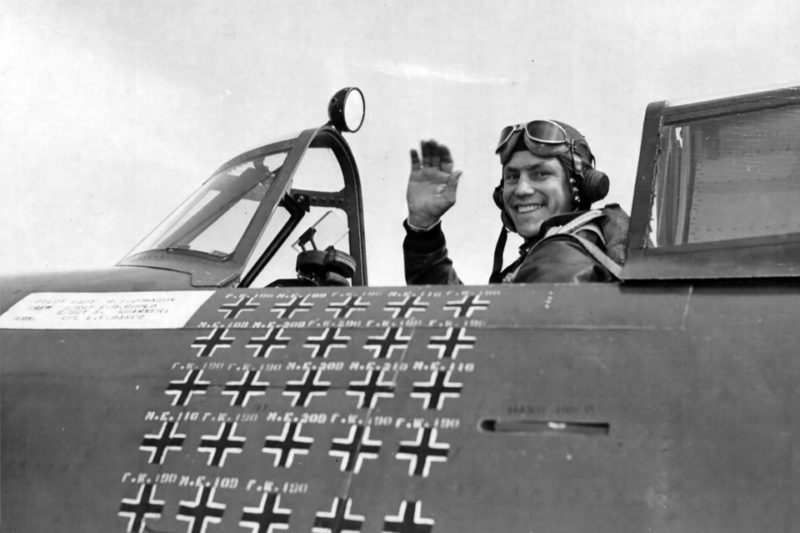
- Born: February 21, 1920; Lawton, Oklahoma, U.S.
- Died: December 27, 1998 (aged 78); Tulsa, Oklahoma, U.S.
- Burial place: River Hills Community Church; Lake Wylie, South Carolina
- Military career
- Allegiance: United States
- Branch: United States Army Air Forces; United States Air Force Reserves
- Service years: 1941–1964
- Rank: Lieutenant Colonel
- Nickname: "Bob"
- Units: 56th Fighter Group; 61st Fighter Squadron
- Conflicts: World War II; Korean War
- Awards: Distinguished Service Cross; Silver Star; Distinguished Flying Cross (9); Purple Heart; Air Medal (4); Distinguished Flying Cross (United Kingdom)

Robert Samuel Johnson (February 21, 1920 – December 27, 1998) was a fighter pilot with the United States Army Air Forces (USAAF) during World War II. He is credited with scoring 27 victories during the conflict flying a Republic P-47 Thunderbolt.

Johnson was the first USAAF fighter pilot in the European theater to surpass Eddie Rickenbacker's World War I score of 26 victories. He finished his combat tour with 27 kills. He was later credited by the Eighth Air Force claims board with a 28th victory when a "probable" was reassessed as a "destroyed", then reduced back to 27 when a post-war review discovered that the Eighth Air Force had inadvertently switched credits for a kill he made with a double kill made by a fellow 56th Fighter Group pilot, Ralph A. Johnson, on November 26, 1943, a day when Robert Johnson aborted the mission after takeoff. (Their army serial numbers were also nearly identical, O-662216 and O-662217.)

== Childhood and flying interest ==
Johnson was born in Lawton, Oklahoma, on February 21, 1920, the son of an automobile mechanic. In his war memoir, Thunderbolt!, he states that he first developed an interest in military aviation in the summer of 1928, when his father took him to see a United States Army Air Corps barnstorming team, "The Three Musketeers", appearing at Ft. Sill's Post Field. Four years later, Johnson took his first flight, a 15-minute night excursion over Lawton in a Ford Tri-motor.

Johnson attended Lawton public schools, was a Boy Scout, and excelled in athletics. For acquiring the skills and aggressiveness he later employed as a fighter pilot, Johnson credited an interest in shooting and hunting small game with a .22 rifle, boxing competitively to learn about controlling fear, and playing high school and junior college football as a blocking guard.

At the age of 11, Johnson began working as a laborer in a Lawton cabinet-making shop, working 8 or more hours daily after school to earn four dollars a week. At 12, he began applying his earnings to flying lessons, soloing after 5 hours and 45 minutes of instruction. He achieved his student license and logged 35 hours in four years of instruction, before suspending his flying lessons because of a newfound interest in girls. While attending Cameron Junior College, Johnson resumed flying in the Civilian Pilot Training Program, and accumulated 100 hours total flight time by his second year. Johnson gave up his full-time job to allow for his varied interests, but continued to hold a series of part-time jobs, including as a firefighter with the Lawton Fire Department.

== Aviation cadet ==
In the summer of 1941, Johnson enlisted as an aviation cadet in the United States Army, and entered the service at Oklahoma City on November 11, 1941, as a member of Class 42F. Pre-Flight training was conducted at Kelly Field, Texas, beginning November 12 and was still in progress when the Japanese attack on Pearl Harbor thrust the United States into World War II.

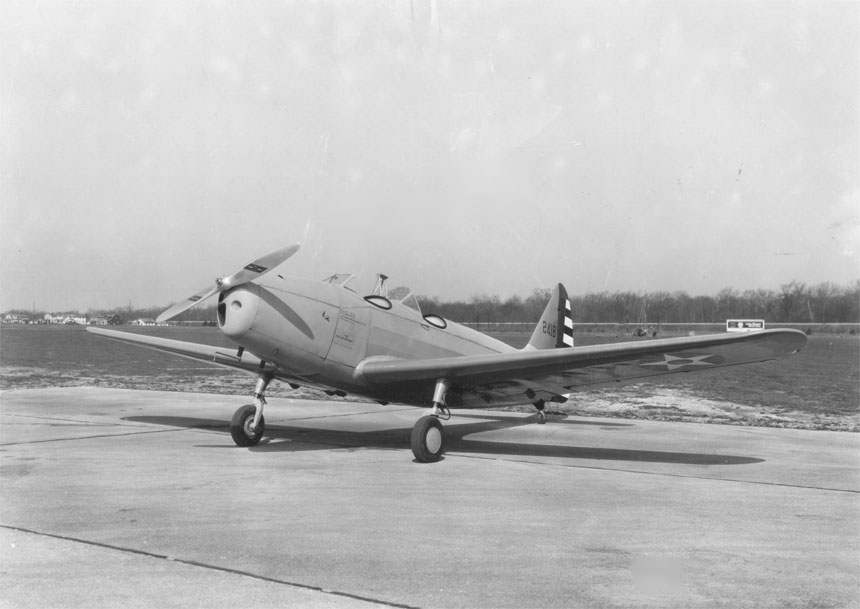
Fairchild PT-19 trainer

On December 18, 1941, Johnson reported to the Missouri Institute of Aeronautics, a civilian contractor school in Sikeston, Missouri, for Primary Flying Training. His first five hours of the pre-solo training phase were flown in a PT-19A, in which he was instructed in spin recoveries, stalls, and basic turning maneuvers. He then began nearly sixty hours of Primary training in the more agile PT-18 Kaydet, practicing aerobatic maneuvers. All of the training, which included more than 175 landings, was conducted in open-cockpit trainers in the dead of winter.

On January 28, 1942, at the midpoint of Primary, he was forced to switch instructors by the school commander. His new instructor became a flying mentor, for which Johnson wrote: "I shall always be indebted to men like (Phil P.) Zampini...(for their) willingness to turn the fledgling into an eagle." Johnson's classmates in Primary included several pilots who would become fighter pilots with him in the 56th Fighter Group, as well as Frank K. Everest Jr.

In February 1942, the USAAF regulation requiring aviation cadets to be unmarried was rescinded. Johnson married Barbara Morgan (whom he had met in high school) in Benton, Missouri, on February 21 immediately upon completing Primary Flying Training.

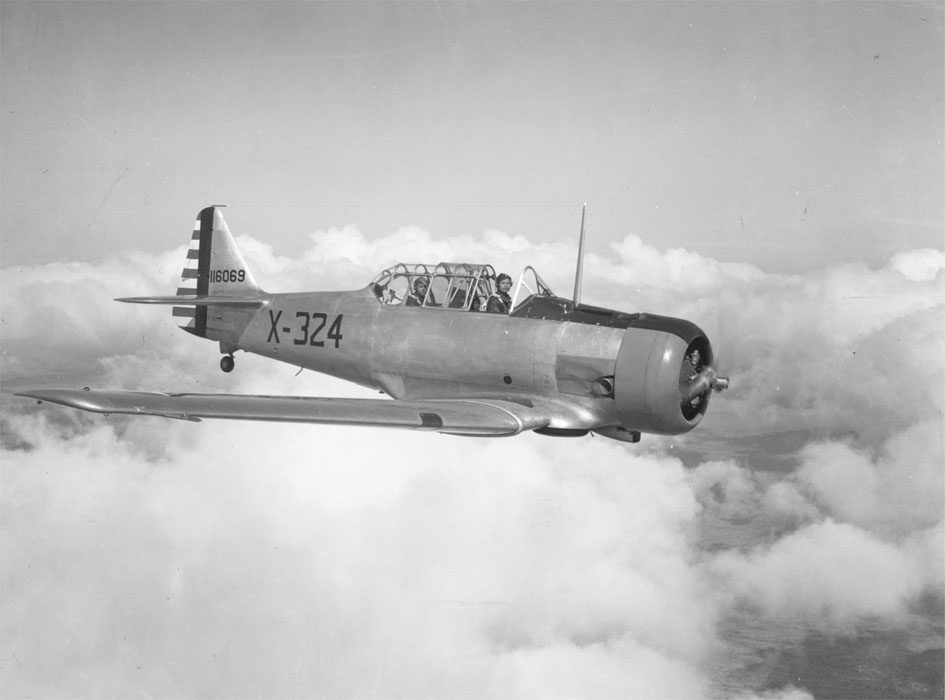
North American AT-6 Texan trainer

On February 27, 1942, Johnson began Basic Flying Training at Randolph Field, Texas. As with the other phases of flying training, the 9-week course of instruction included ground school, military training, and intensive flying practice, this time in the North American BT-9. He received 70 hours of instrument, formation, and night flying in March and April 1942. At the conclusion of basic, at the recommendation of his instructors, Johnson requested multi-engine school for his advanced training course.

Johnson began Advanced training at nearby Kelly Field on May 3, 1942. Although in training for transition to bombers, because multi-engine trainers were not yet available his 93.5 hours of Advanced Flying Training were performed in variants of the North American T-6 Texan: the BC-1 basic combat trainer and the AT-6 advanced trainer. Johnson completed his flight training on June 28, and was commissioned July 9, 1942, as a second lieutenant. Although he requested transition training in the Douglas A-20 Havoc, he instead received orders to report to the 56th Fighter Group.

== 56th Fighter Group ==
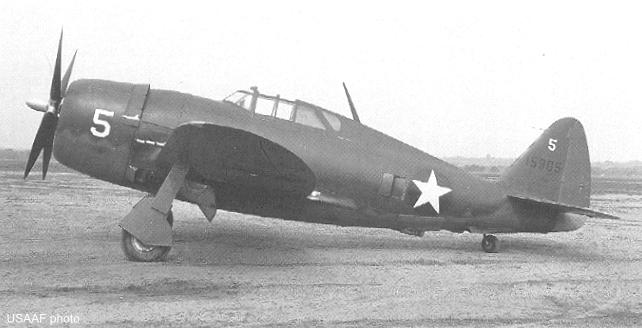
P-47B Thunderbolt

Johnson reported to the group's 61st Fighter Squadron on July 19, 1942, in Bridgeport, Connecticut. The unit had just received the first production P-47B Thunderbolts, and, in effect, was flight testing the new fighter as it trained. While the 56th FG was responsible for many of the modifications that made later variants a successful fighter-bomber, the training resulted in more than forty crashes and 18 fatalities, many of which Johnson blamed on the inadequacy of the small airport at Bridgeport. However, he also asserted that many more lives would have been lost, had not the P-47 proved to have an exceptionally rugged airframe. The P-47 became the first USAAF aircraft to provide an understanding of compressibility and its effects.

The 56th FG was alerted over overseas movement on November 26, 1942, and ceased flying operations in preparation. On December 28 it moved to Camp Kilmer, New Jersey, and on January 6, 1943, sailed from the New York Port of Embarkation aboard the RMS Queen Elizabeth for Scotland. The group arrived on January 13 without aircraft at its first base in the United Kingdom, RAF Kings Cliffe. There it received new P-47C Thunderbolts and trained on them until April, when it began combat operations from a new base at RAF Horsham St Faith.

Johnson, still classified as a bomber pilot, was not officially qualified to fly the P-47 in combat. To rectify that, he was sent to Llanbedr, Wales, on March 10, for a two-week course in gunnery training in which he would fire the Thunderbolt's weapons for the first time. However, bad weather prevented any training flights, and he returned to Kings Cliffe still not qualified. Johnson feared he was losing the confidence of both his group commander, Colonel Hubert Zemke, and his flight leader, Captain Gerald W. Johnson, in his ability to perform as a fighter pilot.

== Combat experiences ==
=== Early missions ===
2nd Lt. Johnson flew his first combat mission on April 18, 1943, which was the second mission of the 56th FG. The mission, a fighter sweep over the coast of the Netherlands, proved entirely uneventful. On his return from his first combat sortie, Johnson and four other pilots were sent to RAF Goxhill to complete gunnery training, but because he could not hit the target sleeve until his final day of training, he wrote, he failed to achieve the minimum required percentage of hits and did not officially qualify as a combat pilot.

The 56th experienced its first combat on April 29, losing two planes and pilots, but Johnson was not scheduled for the mission and did not resume missions until May 3. On May 14 he encountered Luftwaffe aircraft for the first time on a mission to escort Boeing B-17 Flying Fortresses to bomb Antwerp, damaging two Focke-Wulf Fw 190s that had broken up his squadron's formation but becoming separated from the group. Finding himself alone, he broke off the engagement and returned to base to find that he had been erroneously reported as missing in action. On May 19, as part of a diversionary mission, his flight was ambushed by German fighters, but again the inexperienced Johnson was able to elude them.

On June 13, while flying in a flight led by his squadron commander, Major Francis Gabreski, Johnson shot down his first German aircraft (of 10 Staffel, JG 26). The 56th had scored its first confirmed kill just the day before, but had missed an opportunity to achieve a larger victory. As a result, Johnson and his element leader agreed that the pilot spotting the enemy should immediately attack and be supported by the other, regardless of who was leading. Johnson achieved his kill, over an Fw 190, doing just that, but discovered that his element leader had not covered him as agreed. Johnson was reprimanded by Zemke, Gabreski, and Jerry Johnson for breaking formation when the other pilot denied his concurrence. Even so, the kill was confirmed, one of the first among the novice 8th Fighter Command pilots. Johnson received a bottle of Scotch whisky from Major General Carl Spaatz, commanding the 8th Air Force, to mark the occasion.

=== Near-fatal engagement ===
One of the 56th's worst setbacks occurred on June 26, 1943, when 48 P-47Cs left a forward operating base at RAF Manston late in the afternoon to provide escort for B-17 bombers returning from a mission against Villacoublay airfield in the Paris suburbs. As the P-47s approached the rendezvous point near Forges-les-Eaux, they were jumped from above and behind by 16 Focke-Wulf Fw 190s of II Gruppe, JG 26. The first pass scattered the Thunderbolts, and Johnson's aircraft, flying at the rear of the 61st Squadron's formation, was seriously damaged by an Fw 190 fighter which fired twenty-one 20 mm cannon shells into his fuselage which ruptured his hydraulic system. The canopy was shattered, a cannon shot left shrapnel in his leg and a machine gun bullet grazed the tip of his nose. For a while, the flaming P-47 plummeted from the sky, spinning in spirals until Johnson managed to regain control by kicking left rudder to level the wings and pulling back on the stick. The flames went out at this time as well. Burned and partially blinded by hydraulic fluid, Johnson tried to bail out, but his parachute snagged, and the canopy was damaged and would only open about 6 inches. He tried to pry the canopy loose with no success.

After pulling out of the uncontrolled spin and with the fire amazingly going out on its own, Johnson headed for the English Channel but was intercepted by a single Fw 190. The German fighter began pumping rounds into the helpless Thunderbolt. Bullets and cannon shells tore through the fuselage. Johnson jolted every time a shell thumped into the armor plate. Johnson alternatively hit the rudder pedals to throw off the enemy's aim, causing him to overshoot, briefly giving Johnson the advantage. Johnson fired off a couple of rounds before the German looped around to pull up to Johnson's wing. The pilot looked over Johnson's plane, then shook his head in disbelief, then waved at Johnson before getting back behind him to attack again. After another assault of gunfire, the German pilot once again pulled up to Johnson's wing. He waved again before maneuvering to make a final attack. The German manipulated his rudder to move side to side as he fired, spraying Johnson wingtip to wingtip. Unable to fight back, he maneuvered while under a series of attacks, and although sustaining further heavy damage from hundreds of 7.92 mm rounds, managed to survive until the German ran out of ammunition. The German for a final time pulled up to Johnson's wing. He rocked his wings to salute Johnson, then turned back. His opponent was possibly the commander of III/JG 2, Major Egon Mayer. (Note: In The Mighty Eighth, Freeman's account claims that Mayer made a propaganda radio broadcast that night in which he identified one of his victims bearing the markings HV:P, those of Johnson.) However, this theory remains unverified. After landing, Johnson tried to count the bullet holes in his airplane but gave up after the tally passed 200 – without even moving around the aircraft. He also saw the 20 mm shell that had exploded behind his headrest and jammed his canopy.

Another pilot from the 56th fighter group, Lt. Gerald Johnson, recounted the engagement differently. He saw two Fw 190s chasing Robert Johnson's aircraft, one covering the other. Gerald Johnson shot down the Fw 190 attacking Johnson's aircraft, but did not locate the second aircraft. After Robert Johnson recounted the story to the group, Gerald Johnson kept quiet to avoid "spoiling his glory", but recorded his version in his memoir.

While Johnson made it back to land at Manston, four other pilots of the 56th FG were killed in action. A fifth pilot, Samuel D. Hamilton, able to extend only one of his plane's landing gear struts, had to bail out over the English Channel and was rescued north of Yarmouth. 56 FG suffered two more P-47s damaged beyond repair, one Johnson's, and at least 5 more severely damaged against 9 Jagdwaffe confirmed claims. Johnson suffered shrapnel wounds and minor burns to his face, hands, and legs, and was awarded the Purple Heart. He resumed flying missions on July 1.

=== Becoming an ace ===
As the 56th Group gained experience, its success in aerial combat improved dramatically, beginning with 17 Luftwaffe fighters shot down on August 17 while escorting bombers attacking Regensburg and Schweinfurt. Johnson, promoted to first lieutenant in July, got his second kill on August 19 over the Netherlands when he exploded a Messerschmitt Bf 109, but scheduling often left him on the ground on days when the 56th scored high.

That situation changed in early October when a week of deep penetration escort missions resulted in a multiplicity of victories for the 56th FG. On October 8 Johnson, assigned as Jerry Johnson's wingman on an escort mission to Bremen, shot down an Fw 190 that was attacking another P-47. Two days later, covering bombers as they withdrew from Münster, his squadron engaged an estimated 40 fighters intercepting the bombers. In a prolonged and vicious dogfight Johnson shot down a Messerschmitt Bf 110 and one of its Fw 190 escorts, but suffered severe battle damage himself. Both he and 56th deputy commander Major David C. Schilling became aces on that date, becoming the fourth and fifth pilots of the Eighth Air Force to achieve the feat.

Johnson had become an ace while flying primarily as a wingman and overcame a reputation among his commanders for being a "lone wolf" who went off on his own from his squadron. On November 26, 1943, however, Johnson was advanced to flight lead, although on his first mission in that capacity he was forced by a fuel leak to turn back to base shortly after takeoff. Between December 22, 1943, and January 5, 1944, Johnson was the only member of his squadron to score victories, shooting down five German fighters.

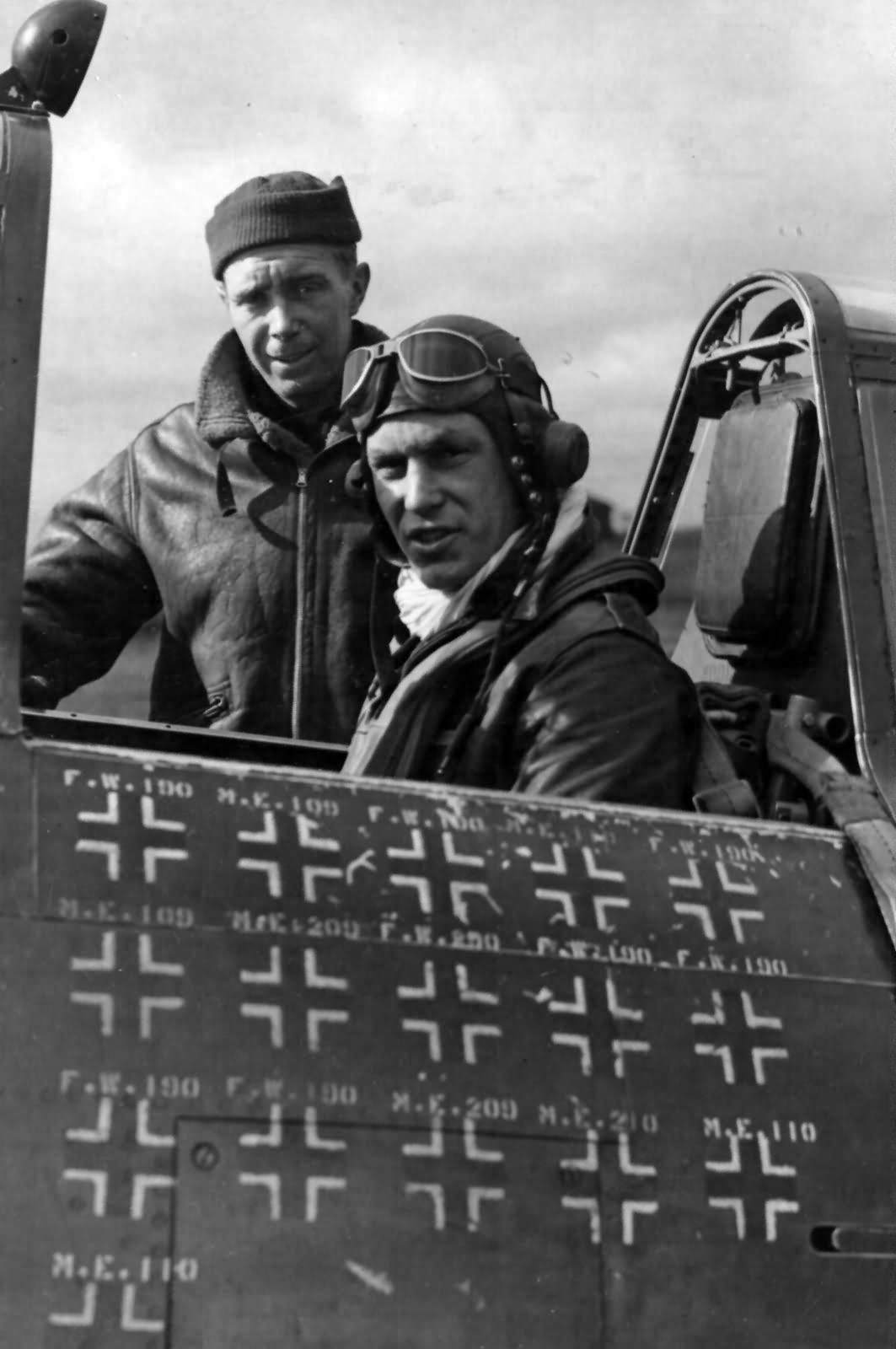
Johnson being greeted by crew chief Pappy Gould on return from a mission in March 1944

In February 1944 the 56th FG began employing 150-gallon drop tanks on missions, enabling them to escort heavy bombers to the target area on deep penetration missions. The 56th was assigned a patrol sector west of Hanover in the vicinity of Dümmer Lake, and there on four missions in February and March Johnson shot down eight more German planes to become the leading U.S. ace at the time. Johnson's 200-hour combat tour was nearly over and he applied for and was granted a 25-hour extension of his tour. Promoted to captain on March 15, he scored three more victories before being transferred to the 62nd Fighter Squadron to act as its operations officer (S-3).

He was promoted to major on May 1, 1944, and on the last mission of his extended tour, recorded his final kills on 8 May 1944, when he broke Rickenbacker's record. He returned to the United States on June 6, 1944. Johnson flew a total of 89 combat missions between April 1943 and May 1944.

Johnson had four aircraft assigned to him during combat operations. His crew chief in the 61st FS was S/Sgt. Ernest D. "Pappy" Gould, and in the 62nd FS, Sgt. J.C. Penrod. Per Roger Freeman, all of Johnson's aerial victories are believed to have occurred while flying these aircraft:

- P-47C-2-RE Half-Pint HV : P a/c serial 41-6235 (damaged on June 26, 1943, repaired, sent to 9th AF), one victory
- P-47D-5-RE Lucky HV : P a/c serial 42-8461 (crashed March 22, 1944, in bad weather while being flown by another pilot), 21 victories
- P-47D-15-RE All Hell HV : P a/c serial 42-76234, 3 victories
- P-47D-21-RA Penrod and Sam LM : Q a/c serial 42-25512, 2 victories. This plane was named after Booth Tarkington's boys' novel of the same name, matching Johnson's crew chief's surname (Penrod) and his own middle name (Samuel).

Johnson's logbook

=== Aerial victory credits ===
Chronicle of aerial victories
Date	#	Type	Location	Aircraft flown	Unit Assigned
June 13, 1943	1	Fw 190	Bergues, France	P-47C	61 FS, 56th FG
August 19, 1943	1	Bf 109G	Woensdrecht, Netherlands	P-47D	61 FS
October 8, 1943	1	Fw 190	Lingen, Germany	P-47D	61 FS
October 10, 1943	1; 1	Bf 110; Fw 190	Münster, Germany	P-47D	61 FS
November 3, 1943	1	Bf 109G	Ameland, Netherlands	P-47D	61 FS
December 22, 1943	1	Bf 109G	Almelo, Netherlands	P-47D	61 FS
December 30, 1943	1	Fw 190	Soissons, France	P-47D	61 FS
December 31, 1943	2	Fw 190	Savenay, France	P-47D	61 FS
January 5, 1944	1	Fw 190	Koblenz, Germany	P-47D	61 FS
January 21, 1944	1	Fw 190	Rouen, France	P-47D	61 FS
January 30, 1944	1; 1	Me 410; Bf 109	Lingen, Germany	P-47D	61 FS
February 20, 1944	2	Bf 110	Dümmer Lake, Germany	P-47D	61 FS
March 6, 1944	1	Fw 190	Dümmer Lake, Germany	P-47D	61 FS
March 8, 1944	2	Bf 109	Steinhude Lake, Germany	P-47D	61 FS
March 15, 1944	2; 1	Fw 190; Bf 109	Dümmer Lake, Germany	P-47D	61 FS
April 9, 1944	1	Fw 190	Kiel, Germany	P-47D	61 FS
April 13, 1944	2	Fw 190	Kaiserslautern, Germany	P-47D	61 FS
May 8, 1944	1; 1	Bf 109; Fw 190	Celle, Germany	P-47D	62 FS, 56 FG

SOURCES: Air Force Historical Study 85: USAF Credits for the Destruction of Enemy Aircraft, World War II, Freeman, The Mighty Eighth, 273–274

== Awards and decorations ==
Command pilot

Distinguished Service Cross
Silver Star
Distinguished Flying Cross with silver and three bronze oak leaf clusters
Purple Heart
Air Medal with three bronze oak leaf clusters
Air Force Presidential Unit Citation
American Defence Service Medal
American Campaign Medal
European-African-Middle Eastern Campaign Medal with silver and bronze campaign stars
World War II Victory Medal
National Defense Service Medal
Korean Service Medal
Air Force Longevity Service Ribbon
Armed Forces Reserve Medal with bronze hourglass device
Distinguished Flying Cross (United Kingdom)
United Nations Korea Medal
Korean War Service Medal

=== Distinguished Service Cross citation ===

Johnson, Robert S.
Captain (Air Corps), U.S. Army Air Forces
61st Fighter Squadron, 56th Fighter Group, 8th Air Force
Date of Action: March 15, 1944

Citation:

The President of the United States of America, authorized by Act of Congress July 9, 1918, takes pleasure in presenting the Distinguished Service Cross to Captain (Air Corps) Robert Samuel Johnson, United States Army Air Forces, for heroism in connection with military operations against an armed enemy while serving as Pilot of a P-47 Fighter Airplane in the 61st Fighter Squadron, 56th Fighter Group, EIGHTH Air Force, in aerial combat against enemy forces on 15 March 1944. On this date, Captain Johnson led a flight of fighter airplanes in an attack against a force of enemy fighters attempting to intercept a friendly bomber formation. Although more than thirty enemy fighters were in a favorable position above him, Captain Johnson, mindful only of his duty to protect the bombers, led his flight of nine planes in an attack on another formation of more than forty enemy fighters then about to engage the bombers. During the engagement that followed, he personally destroyed three enemy fighters. By his courage, his aggressiveness, and his determination to destroy the enemy and protect the bombers, Captain Johnson rendered valorous and distinguished service to our nation. Captain Johnson's unquestionable valor in aerial combat is in keeping with the highest traditions of the military service and reflects credit upon himself, the 8th Air Force, and the United States Army Air Forces.

== Post-war career ==
After the war, Johnson became the chief test pilot for Republic Aviation, maker of the P-47, where he worked as an engineering executive for 18 years, and served as national president of the Air Force Association from 1949 to 1951. He remained a member of the US Air Force Reserve, visiting Air Force bases in South Korea in December 1951, and retired as a lieutenant colonel in 1962 from the Air Force Reserve. In 1964 Johnson became an insurance executive in Lake Wylie, South Carolina.

The terminal building at Lawton-Fort Sill Regional Airport, in his birthplace, Lawton, Oklahoma, is named in his memory. A painting of Johnson's final mission was commissioned by the Oklahoma State Senate Historical Preservation Fund, Inc. in 2000 and hangs in the Oklahoma State Senate conference room on the fourth floor of the Oklahoma State Capitol.

Johnson collaborated with aviation author Martin Caidin to write his autobiographical story of the 56th Fighter Group, Thunderbolt!, in 1958.

== See also ==
- Gabby Gabreski, another ace who flew with the 61st Fighter Squadron.
