= Mahoney–Clark House =

- U.S. National Register of Historic Places
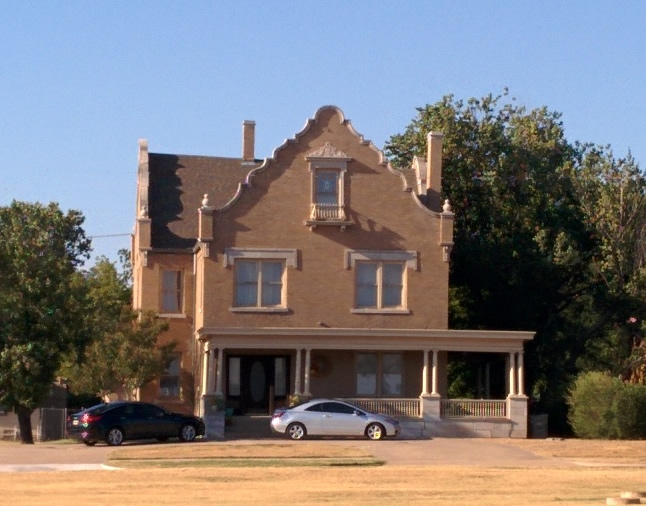

- Location within Oklahoma
- Location: 513-515 West Gore Avenue, Lawton, Oklahoma
- Coordinates: 34°36′34″N 98°23′46″W
- Area: less than one acre
- Built: 1909
- Architectural style: Spanish Colonial
- NRHP reference No.: 82001494
- Added to NRHP: December 8, 1982

The Mahoney–Clark House is a historic house in Lawton, Oklahoma. It was built in 1909 for Johanna Mahoney, the wife of John C. Mahoney. It was inherited by their daughter Loretta and her husband, Philip Henry Clark, in 1911. It was later acquired by the Lawton Heritage Association.

The house was designed in the Spanish Revival architectural style. It has been listed on the National Register of Historic Places since December 8, 1982.
