= Martha Helen Beal =

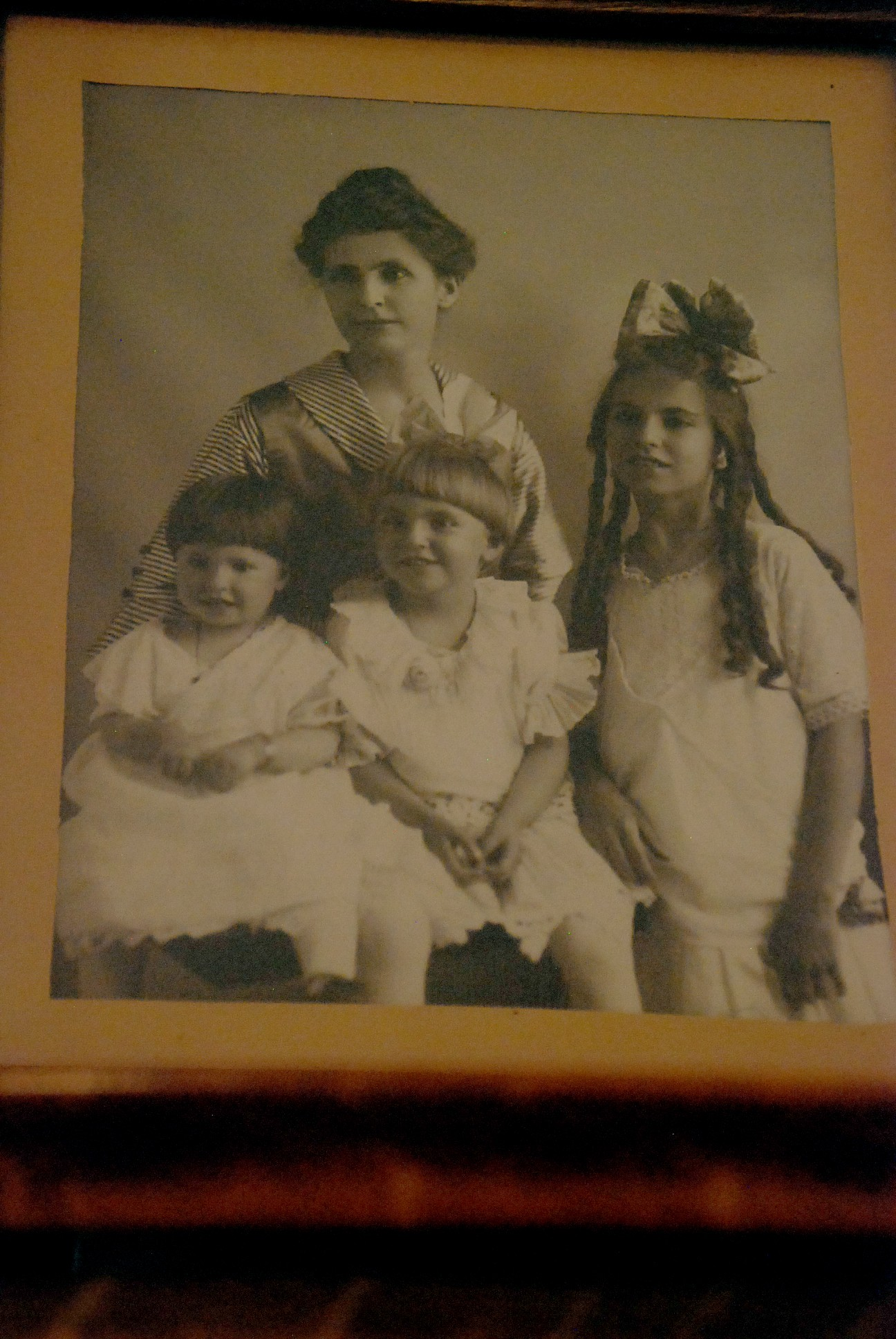
- Martha Helen Beal and her three children
- Born: September 16, 1879; Ash Grove, Missouri
- Died: July 24, 1931 (aged 51); Lawton, Oklahoma
- Occupation: Homesteader
- Known for: "First Lady of Lawton, Oklahoma"; building Mattie Beal House

Martha Helen Beal was an American homesteader in Oklahoma Territory known for being the second name drawn in the Lawton and El Reno land lottery at the age of 22. She is known as the "First Lady of Lawton" and for building the Mattie Beal House in Lawton.

== Early life and family ==
Martha Helen Beal was born on September 16, 1879, to Benjamin Taylor and Louisa Jane Beal in Ash Grove, Missouri. The family moved to Oklahoma Territory during the Land Run of 1891, settling near Ingalls. She graduated from Stillwater High School and then worked as switchboard operator in Wichita, Kansas.

== Land Lottery and Lawton ==
Beal registered for the land lottery held on July 29, 1901, and was drawn second in the Lawton Land District, winning 160 acres. After winning her land, she received over 500 marriage proposals. She owned the land in Lawton that extended from Lee Boulevard northward to the alleyway between I and J streets, and from Railroad Street westward to 11th Street. She donated land that would become Lincoln Elementary School, two city parks, and a church. She married Charles W. Payne on July 16, 1902. By 1907, the couple had begun building the Mattie Beal House and once complete Beal would live there the rest of her life. She died on July 24, 1931, due to a ruptured appendix. Her husband Charles faced financial difficulties after her death and sold the Mattie Beal House in 1939 . The home was acquired by the Lawton Heritage Association in 1974.
