= Lawton Area Transit System =

Provider of mass transportation in Comanche County, Oklahoma

- Founded: 2002
- Headquarters: 611 SW Bishop Rd
- Locale: Lawton, Oklahoma
- Service area: Comanche County, Oklahoma
- Service type: Bus service, paratransit
- Routes: 5
- Hubs: 400 block of SW B Ave
- Fleet: 13 buses
- Annual ridership: 193,136 (2022)
- Website: Lawton Area Transit System

Lawton Area Transit System, or LATS, is the primary provider of mass transportation in Lawton, Oklahoma with five routes serving the region. As of 2019, the system provided 346,742 rides over 43,108 annual vehicle revenue hours with 13 buses and 8 paratransit vehicles.

== History ==
As background, public transit in Lawton may be said to have its origins in a franchise issued around 1908 or 1909 to the Lawton and Fort Sill Railway (also known as the Lawton Northwestern Electric Co.) to create an interurban line, and some trackage was actually laid. However, the process went dormant until Lawton Railway and Light began further work on the system in 1914, with the electric railway becoming operational on July 11 of that year, running between Lawton and the army post of Fort Sill, about 6.31 miles in total. That same year, war broke out in Europe, and by 1916 Ft. Sill had ramped up, reaching a wartime peak of 60,000 soldiers. The trolleys were the only link between the post and recreation in Lawton, making the system of outsized importance to the post, especially on weekends. However, the war was over by 1919, and the post went back to housing a few thousand men. In 1921 the railway explored extension to the resort town of Medicine Park, Oklahoma, which would have involved another 9 miles of track; but, nothing came of the plan. A few busses were added to the network, yet business continued to slow and, on November 11, 1927, rail operations ceased.

For some time, bus transit was provided in the city, but that ended in 1972. For the following 30 years, Lawton went without any transit service.

LATS began operations on April 29, 2002, with 10 buses on five routes serving 564 passengers on the first day. Fares began at $1.00 with service provided from 6 a.m. to 6 p.m. on weekdays and on Saturdays from 9 a.m. to 9 p.m.

On July 25, 2023, the Lawton City Council approved a location for the future city of a transit center. As of 2023, buses utilize the 400 block of SW B Ave for transfers. With a new transit center located between Railroad St and Larrance Ave, and between B and D avenues, the system will be able to better serve passengers and a new downtown trolley service will be initiated. The facility will be designed by Wendel Architects and is expected to break ground in 2025.

== Service ==
Operations and routes have changed over time. LATS updated its routes effective in June of 2025, reducing their number from 9 to 8, and making all routes operate in one direction only. The routes are color-coded Red, Blue, Black, Brown, Purple, Green, Orange, and Yellow. Operation Service Hours are Monday-Friday from 6:00am-8:00pm, and Saturday from 9:00am-6:00pm, with the service closed on Sundays.

== Fixed route ridership ==
The ridership statistics shown here are of fixed route services only and do not include demand response services.

== See also ==
- List of bus transit systems in the United States
- Greyhound Lines
