= Lawton–Fort Sill Regional Airport =

Airport in Comanche County, Oklahoma, US

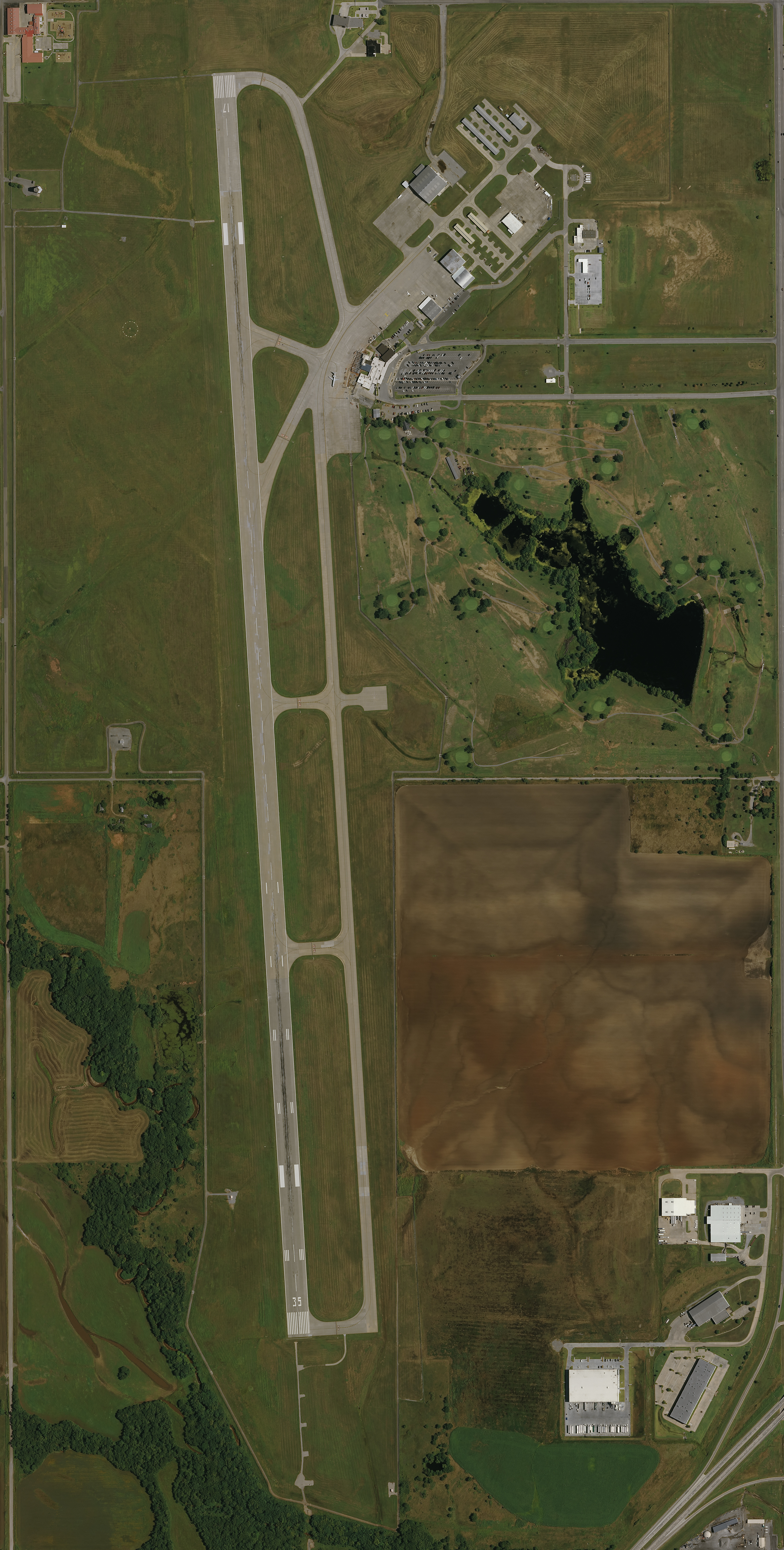
- IATA: LAW; ICAO: KLAW; FAA LID: LAW

Summary
- Airport type: Public
- Owner: City of Lawton
- Serves: Lawton, Oklahoma
- Elevation AMSL: 1,110 ft / 338 m
- Coordinates: 34°34′04″N 098°24′59″W
- Website: www.FlyLawton.org

Map
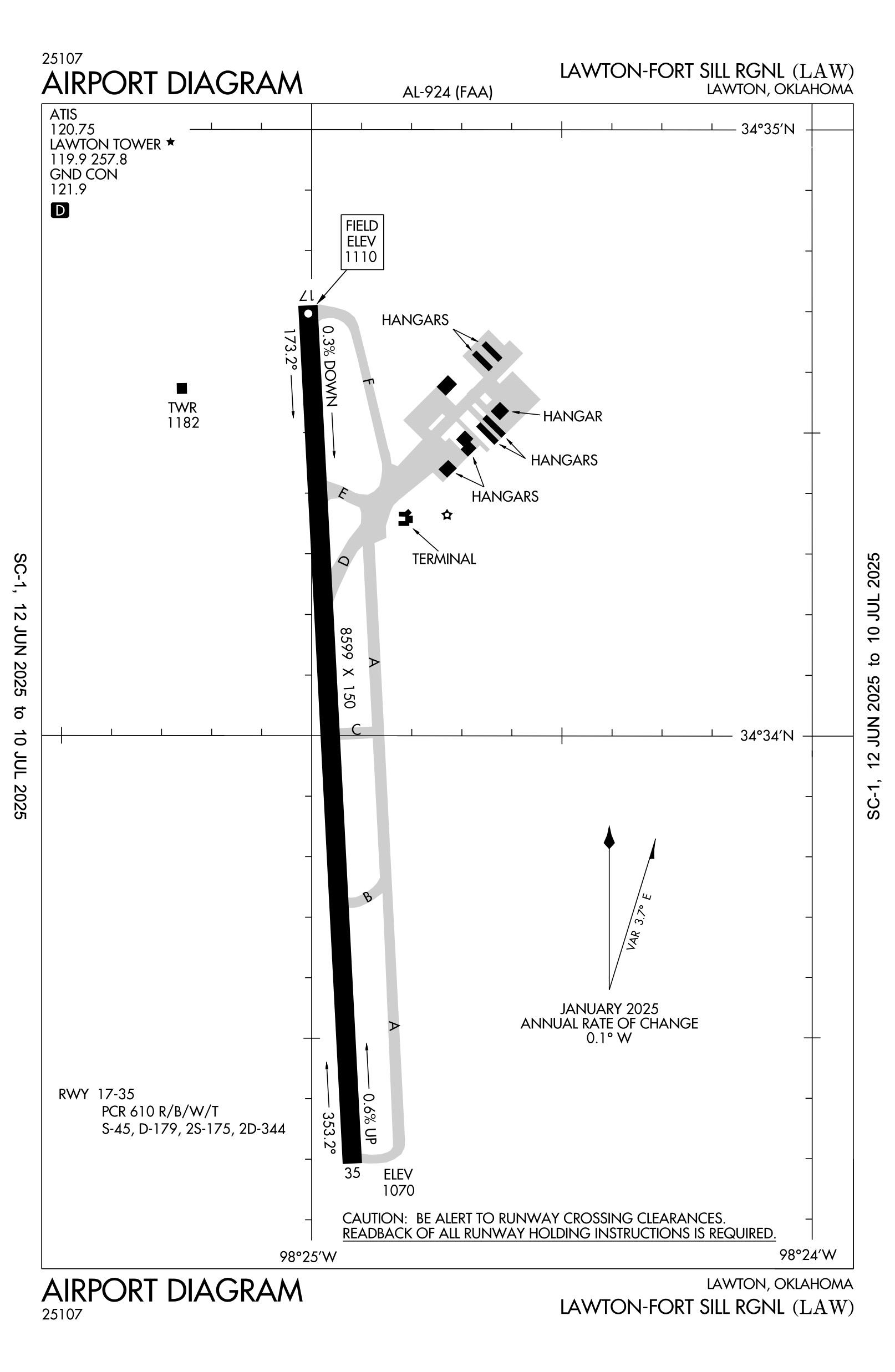
- FAA airport diagram

Runways
Direction	Length		Surface
Direction	ft	m	Surface
17/35	8,599	2,621	Concrete

Statistics (2022)
- Aircraft operations: 24,289
- Based aircraft: 53
- Source: Federal Aviation Administration

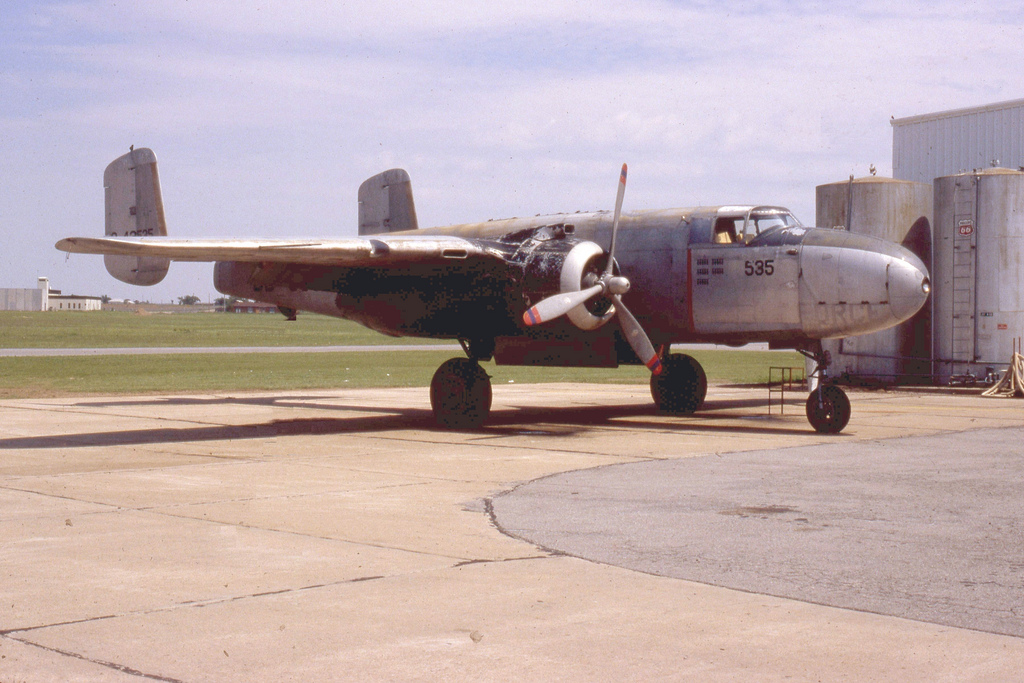

Lawton–Fort Sill Regional Airport (IATA: LAW, ICAO: KLAW, FAA LID: LAW) is two miles south of Lawton, in Comanche County, Oklahoma. It is used for military aviation from nearby Fort Sill and Sheppard Air Force Base and is served by American Eagle. Allegiant Air runs occasional charters.

The National Plan of Integrated Airport Systems for 2011–2015 categorized it as a primary commercial service airport. Federal Aviation Administration records say the airport had 77,533 passenger boardings (enplanements) in calendar year 2008, 71,389 in 2009 and 68,054 in 2010.

== Facilities ==
The airport covers 1,300 acres (526 ha) at an elevation of 1,110 feet (338 m). Its single runway, 17/35, is 8,599 by 150 feet (2,621 x 46 m) concrete.

In the year ending December 31, 2022 the airport had 24,289 aircraft operations, average 66 per day: 63% military, 30% general aviation, 6% airline, and <1% air taxi. Fifty-three aircraft were then based at the airport: 42 single-engine, four multi-engine, four jet, and three helicopters.

== Airlines and destinations ==
Airlines	Destinations
American Eagle	Dallas/Fort Worth

American Eagle offers the only regularly scheduled service for Lawton, with daily flights to and from Dallas/Fort Worth.

Continental Airlines flew to Lawton from 1948 until 1975, with DC-9s starting in 1967. Central Airlines served the city starting in 1953-54; successor Frontier Airlines served it until 1981.

== Aircraft ==
Embraer ERJ-140s and Canadair CRJ-700s on American Eagle and general aviation.

== See also ==
- List of airports in Oklahoma
