= Sam Maddux Jr. =

United States Air Force general

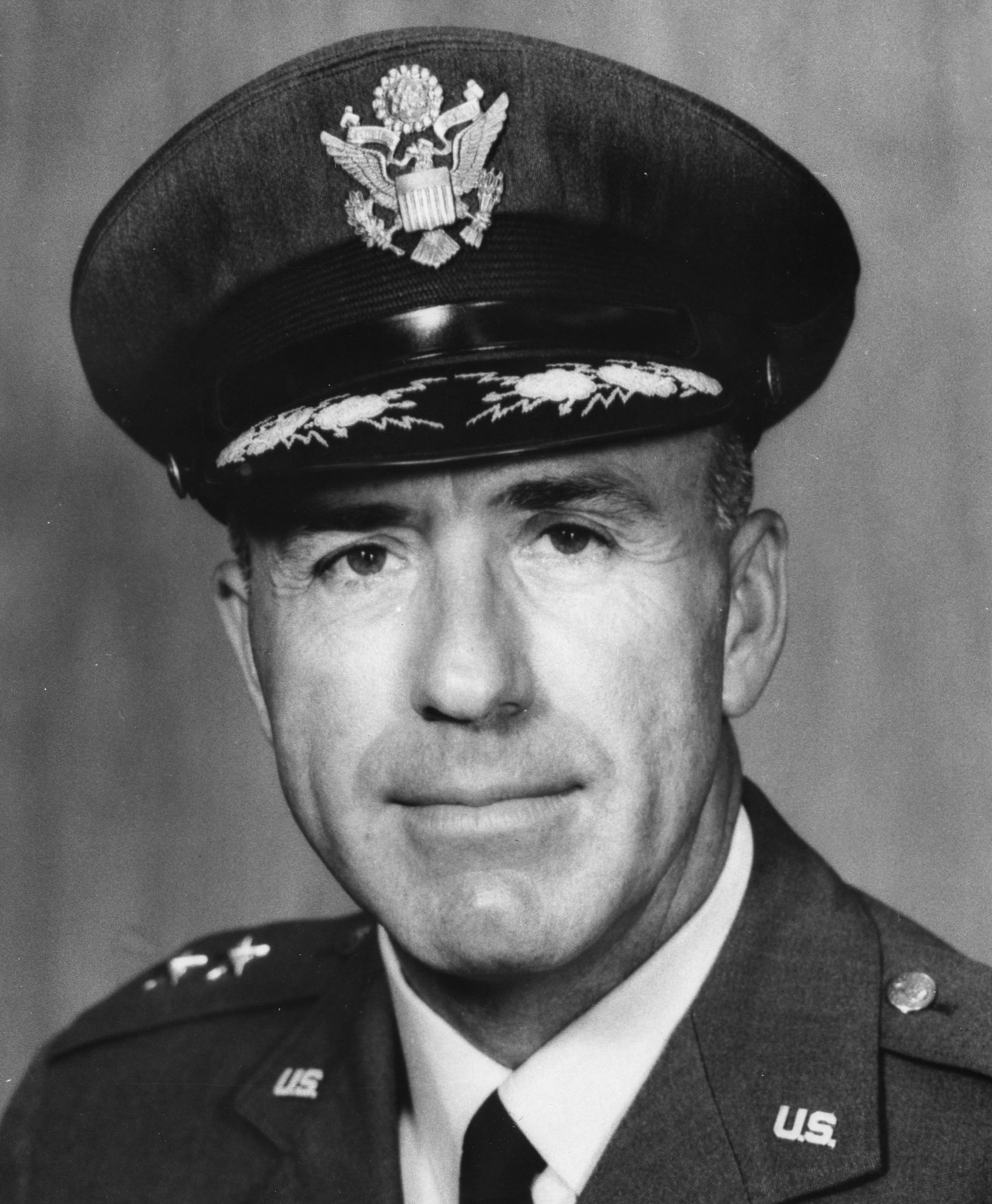
- Born: April 7, 1915; Lawton, Oklahoma
- Died: November 28, 1990 (aged 75); San Antonio, Texas
- Military career
- Allegiance: United States of America
- Branch: United States Air Force
- Service years: 1937–1970
- Rank: Lieutenant General
- Commands: Air Training Command
- Awards: Distinguished Service Medal, Legion of Merit with oak leaf cluster, Distinguished Flying Cross, Bronze Star Medal with oak leaf cluster, Air Medal, Joint Services Commendation Medal and the Purple Heart, others (see below)

Sam Maddux Jr. (April 7, 1915 – November 28, 1990) was an American Air Force lieutenant general who was commander of Air Training Command with headquarters at Randolph Air Force Base, Texas.

== Biography ==
Maddux was born in Lawton, Oklahoma. He received a bachelor of arts degree from the University of Oklahoma in 1936, and was commissioned a second lieutenant in October 1937 upon completion of flying training at Randolph and Kelly fields, Texas.

=== Service ===
His first assignment as a pilot was in the Panama Canal Zone from 1937 to 1940, where he flew pursuit aircraft. In June 1940 he was assigned to the 19th Bombardment Group as a B-17 pilot. In May 1941 he participated in the first long-range, over-water flight of land-based bombers, from California to Hawaii; and in October 1941 he piloted a B-17 to the Philippines, arriving there shortly before the U.S. involvement in World War II began on December 7, 1941. He was on Bataan and in Australia and New Guinea until November 1942 when he was sent to Washington, D.C., for duty on the War Department General Staff.

In August 1945 Maddux returned to the Pacific with the 20th Bomber Command on Guam. In 1946 he became chief of personnel of the Far East Air Forces with headquarters in Japan, where he remained until assignment to the Air War College in 1948. From 1949 until 1952 he was a division chief in Deputy Chief of Staff for Personnel, Headquarters U.S. Air Force, and in 1952 he attended the National War College. From 1953 to 1957 Maddux commanded the Navigator Training Wing at Mather Air Force Base, California. In July 1957 he became deputy commander of Flying Training Air Force and in June 1958 the inspector general of the Air Training Command.

Maddux served as the senior member, United Nations Command, Military Armistice Commission at Panmunjom, Korea, from October 1959 until May 1960, when he became deputy for plans and operations to the commander in chief, Pacific. In August 1963 he returned to the Philippines as the commander, Thirteenth Air Force.

In July 1965 he became the vice commander in chief of the Pacific Air Forces and in 1966 assumed command of the Air Training Command. He retired September 1, 1970.

=== Awards and Medals ===
His military decorations include the Distinguished Service Medal, Legion of Merit with oak leaf cluster, Distinguished Flying Cross, Bronze Star Medal with oak leaf cluster, Air Medal, Joint Services Commendation Medal and the Purple Heart. In 1957 he was awarded the Air Force Association Citation of Honor for outstanding contribution to the advancement of airpower in the interest of national security and world peace. He also holds the Vietnamese Air Force Distinguished Service Medal 1st Class, the Vietnamese Air Force Air Gallantry Medal with Gold Wings, Korean Order of Military Merit Taeguk, Chinese Medal of Cloud and Banner, and the First Class Knight Grand Cross of the Most Noble Order of the Crown of Thailand.
