= Mattie Beal House =

- U.S. National Register of Historic Places
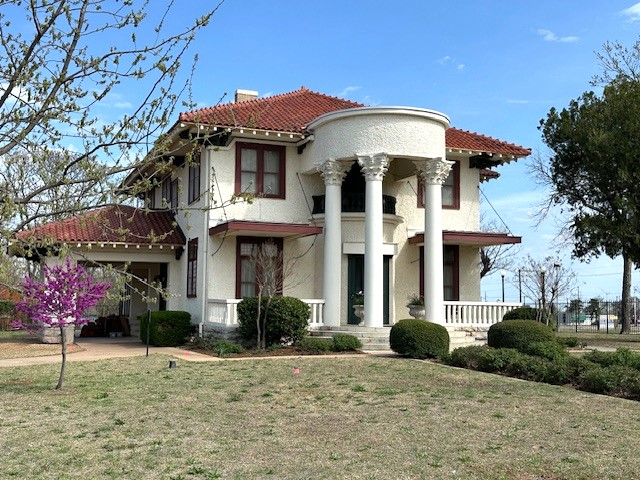
- Mattie Beal House in Lawton, 3-2025

- Location within Oklahoma Location within the United States
- Location: 5th Street and Summit Avenue, Lawton, Oklahoma
- Coordinates: 34°35′44″N 98°23′41″W
- Area: less than one acre
- Built: 1907-09
- Architectural style: Colonial Revival
- NRHP reference No.: 75001564
- Added to NRHP: August 19, 1975

The Mattie Beal House is a historic house in Lawton, Oklahoma, U.S.. It was built in 1907-09 for Charles Warren Payne and his wife, Martha Helen Beal. It was acquired by the Lawton Heritage Association in 1973. It was designed in the Colonial Revival architectural style. It has been listed on the National Register of Historic Places since August 19, 1975.

Martha Helen Beal won the second draw in the 1901 land lottery of former Kiowa-Comanche-Apache reservation lands, which led to worldwide news coverage: "'Miss Mattie Beale, beautiful, blue-eyed, young telephone operator from Wichita, Kansas, draws claim number 2 in Kiowa-Comanche land opening...' That story in the Kansas City Journal was echoed, with pictures, in newspapers everywhere. Among the more than 500 letters proposing marriage were several from English nobility who'd read her story in the London Times.

The house has a porte-cochere and a two-story "barn/garage/servants quarters structure".
