= Centenary Methodist Church (New Bern, North Carolina) =

Historic church in North Carolina, United States

- U.S. National Register of Historic Places
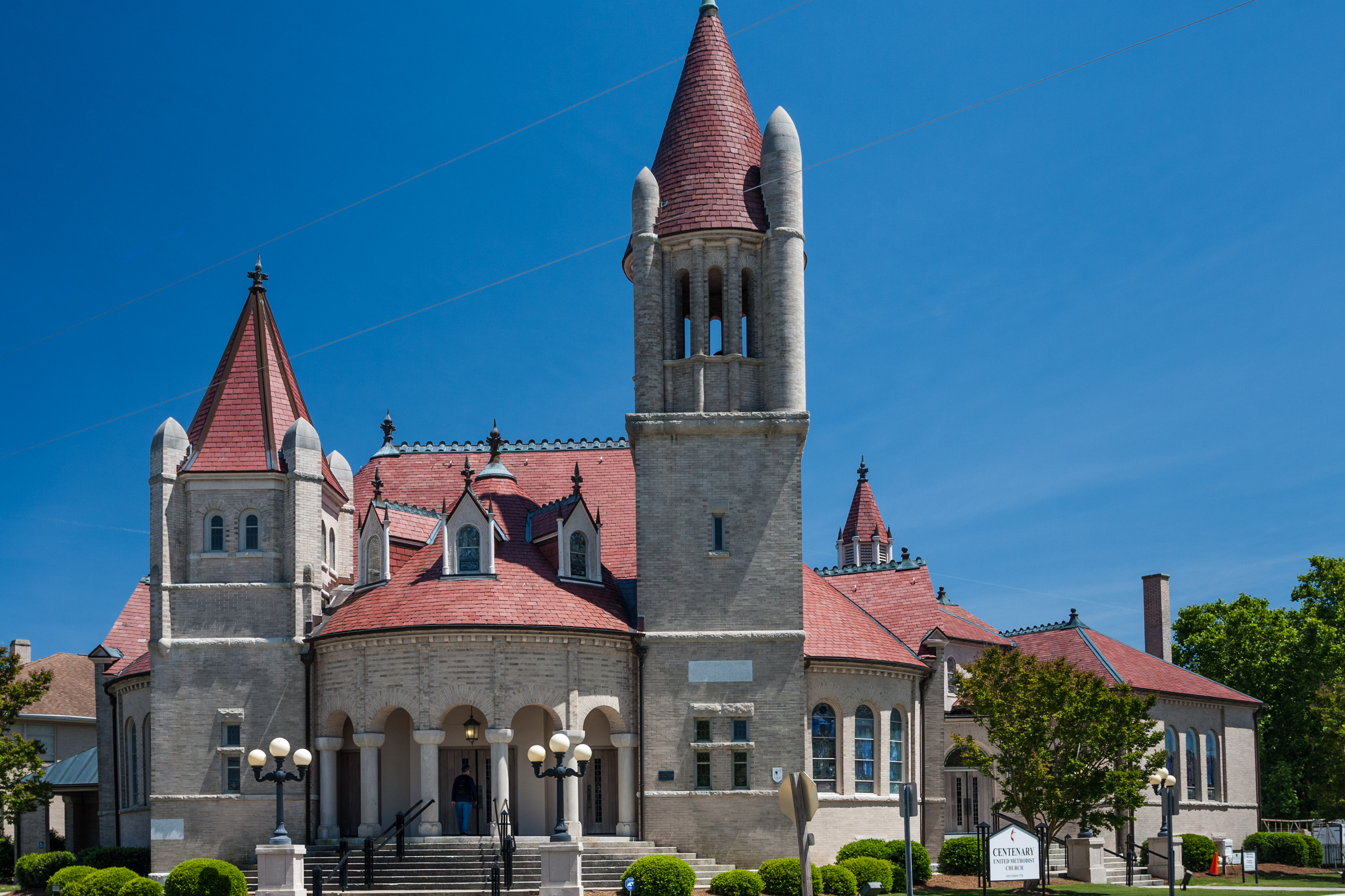

- Location within North Carolina Location within the United States
- Location: 209 New St., New Bern, North Carolina
- Coordinates: 35°6′32″N 77°2′21″W
- Area: 1.5 acres (0.61 ha)
- Built: 1904-1905
- Architect: Simpson, Herbert Woodley; Stephens & Cardelli
- NRHP reference No.: 72000937
- Added to NRHP: September 11, 1972

Centenary United Methodist Church is a Methodist church in New Bern, Craven County, North Carolina, built in 1904–1905 as an irregularly shaped multipurpose brick complex. The front facade includes a five-bay arcade entrance beneath a low conical roof, flanked by square corner towers of unequal height. It belongs to the United Methodist Church and was listed on the National Register of Historic Places in 1972.
