= Centenary United Methodist Church (Lawton, Oklahoma) =

Historic church in Oklahoma, United States

- Centenary United Methodist Church (Methodist Episcopal Church, South)
- U.S. National Register of Historic Places
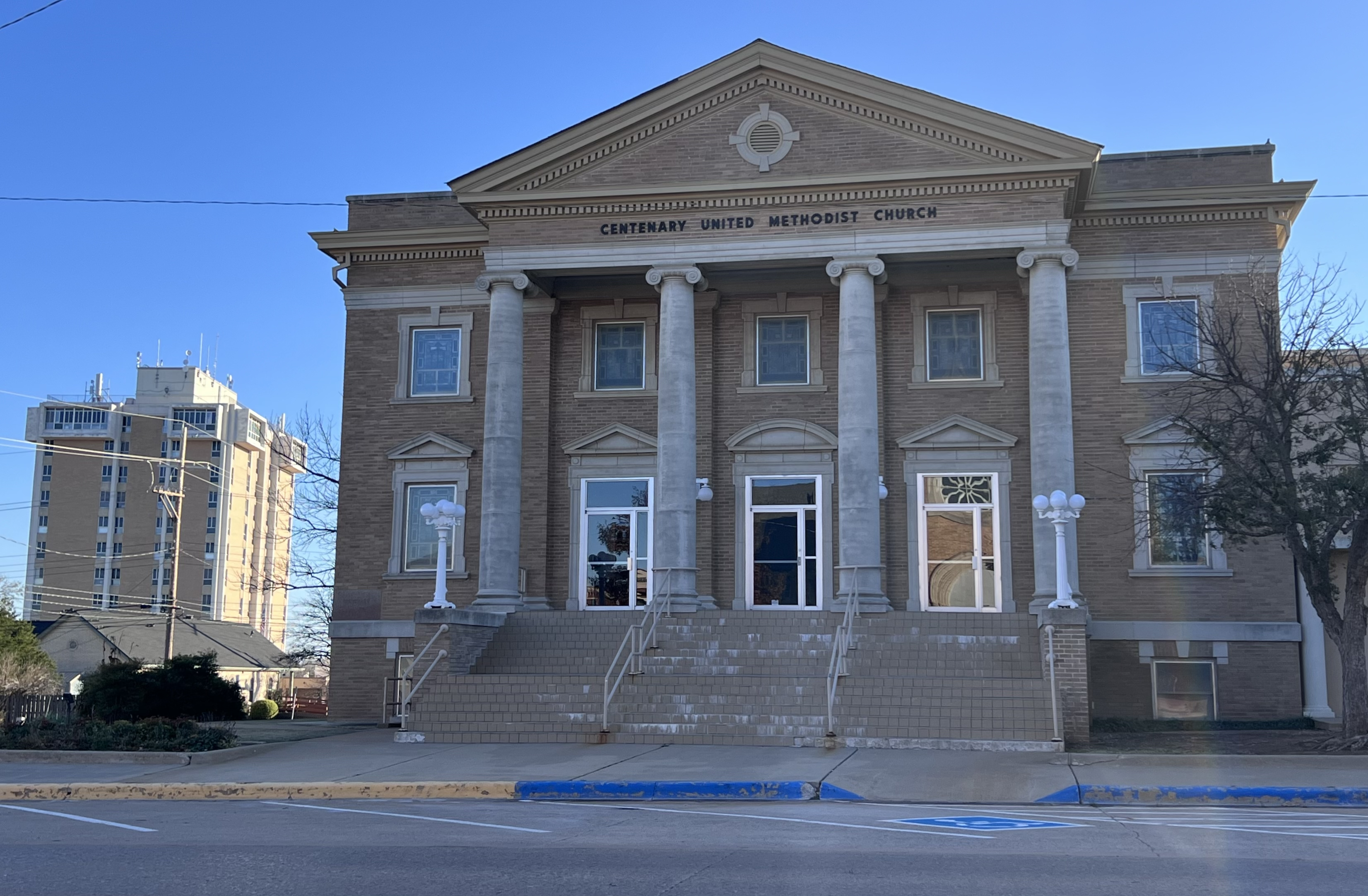

- Location within Oklahoma Location within the United States
- Location: 702 D Ave., Lawton, Oklahoma
- Coordinates: 34°36′14″N 98°23′54″W
- Area: less than one acre
- Built: 1924
- Architectural style: Classical Revival
- NRHP reference No.: 85000567
- Added to NRHP: March 12, 1985

Centenary United Methodist Church (formerly known as the Methodist Episcopal Church, South) is a historic church at 702 D Avenue in Lawton, Oklahoma.

It was built in 1924 in a Classical Revival style and added to the National Register in 1985.
