= Lawton, Oklahoma =

City in Oklahoma, US

Lawton, Oklahoma Sooka̠hni (Comanche)
- City
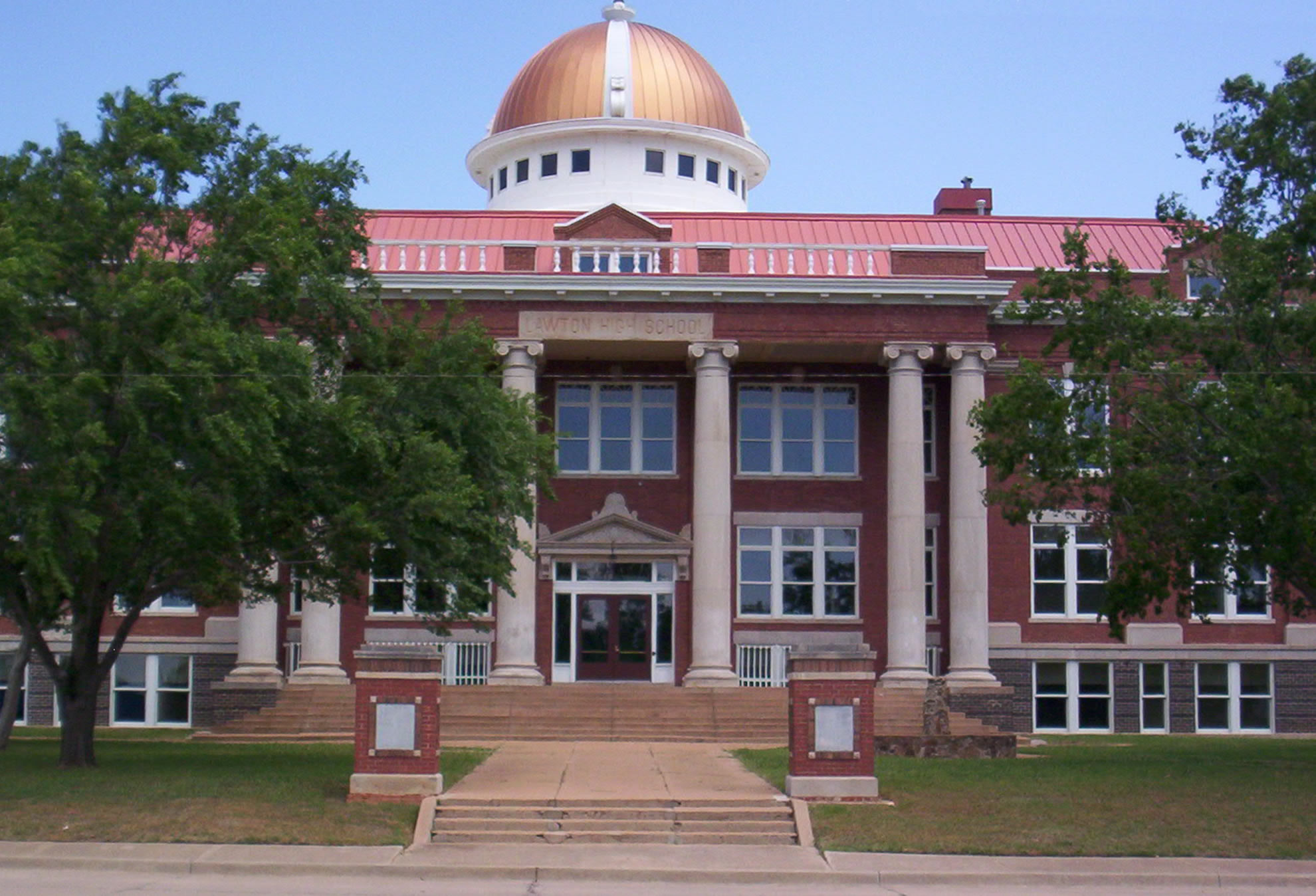
- Lawton City Hall (2010)

- Location in the state of Oklahoma

- Location in the United States
- Coordinates: 34°36′15″N 98°23′44″W
- Country: United States
- State: Oklahoma
- County: Comanche
- Founded: August 6, 1901
- Named for: Henry Ware Lawton

Government
  - Type: Council–manager
  - Mayor: Stan Booker (R)
  - City Manager: John Ratliff

Area
  - City: 81.47 sq mi (211.00 km^{2})
  - Land: 81.44 sq mi (210.92 km^{2})
  - Water: 0.035 sq mi (0.09 km^{2}) 0.04%
- Elevation: 1,145 ft (349 m)

Population (2020)
  - City: 90,381
  - Rank: US: 304th
  - Density: 1,109.9/sq mi (428.52/km^{2})
  - Urban: 87,464 (US: 336th)
  - Metro: 131,089 (US: 300th)
- Time zone: UTC−6 (CST)
  - Summer (DST): UTC−5 (CDT)
- ZIP codes: 73501–73503, 73505-73507
- Area code: 580
- FIPS code: 40-41850
- GNIS feature ID: 2411638
- Website: City of Lawton

Lawton is a city in and the county seat of Comanche County in the U.S. state of Oklahoma. Located in western Oklahoma, about 87 mi (140 km) southwest of Oklahoma City, it is the principal city of the Lawton, Oklahoma, metropolitan statistical area. According to the 2020 census, Lawton's population was 90,381, making it the sixth-largest city in the state, and the largest in Western Oklahoma. The Comanche Nation is headquartered within the city.

Developed on former reservation lands of the Kiowa, Comanche, and Apache peoples, Lawton was incorporated in 1901. It was named after Major General Henry Ware Lawton, who served in the Civil War, where he earned the Medal of Honor, and was killed in action in the Philippine–American War. Lawton's landscape is typical of the Great Plains, with flat topography and gently rolling hills, while the area north of the city is marked by the Wichita Mountains.

The city's proximity to the Fort Sill Military Reservation, formerly the base of the Apache territory before statehood, gave Lawton economic and population stability throughout the 20th century.

Although Lawton's economy is still largely dependent on Fort Sill, it has grown to encompass manufacturing, higher education, health care, and retail. The city has a council-manager government; the city council members are elected from single-member districts and the mayor is elected at-large. They hire a professional city manager to direct daily operations.

Interstate 44 and three major United States highways serve the city, Lawton-Fort Sill Regional Airport connects Lawton by air, while Greyhound Lines and the Lawton Area Transit System provide intercity and local bus service, respectively. Lawton is also home to Cameron University, which enrolled nearly 3,700 students in 2024.

== History ==
The territory of present-day Oklahoma was long settled by ancient cultures of prehistoric American Indians, including the Clovis, 11500 BCE; Folsom, 10600 BCE; and Plainview, 10000 BCE cultures.

The valleys of the Arkansas River and Red River were the center of Caddoan Mississippian culture, which began to develop about 800 CE. The people developed more dense settlement and a complex architecture of earthwork platform mounds. Archeological evidence has shown that these people were the direct ancestors of the historic Caddoan-language peoples who inhabited the larger region, including the Caddo and the Wichita peoples.

Spanish explorer Francisco Vásquez de Coronado visited in 1541, beginning European contact. Around the 1700s, two tribes from the north, the Comanche and Kiowa, migrated to the Oklahoma and Texas regions.

For most of the 18th century, the French exerted nominal control over the Oklahoma region as part of French Louisiana. The largest French settlements were along the Gulf Coast, in New Orleans, Louisiana, and Mobile, Alabama. The limited interaction between the Native American and European peoples was based on fur trading.

In 1803, the French sold this territory as Louisiana Purchase to the US, under President Thomas Jefferson. European Americans continued to migrate into the Southeast and across the Mississippi River into Indian territories, especially seeking territory to expand cotton cultivation, which was a lucrative commodity crop. They pressured the government to give them access to Indian lands. In 1830, under President Andrew Jackson, Congress passed the Indian Removal Act, which removed American Indian tribes from the Southeast and relocated them to Indian Territory west of the Mississippi River.

The southern part of this territory was originally assigned to the Choctaw and Chickasaw. Following the Civil War, during which most of the Southeast tribes that had allied with the Confederacy in the United States required new peace treaties. In 1867, under the Medicine Lodge Treaty, it allotted the southwest portion of former Choctaw and Chickasaw lands to the Comanche, Kiowa, and Apache tribes. It had forced them to move out of East Texas and nearby areas of Arkansas.

Fort Sill was established in 1869 after the American Civil War and commanded by Major General Philip Sheridan. He was leading a campaign in Indian Territory to stop raids into Texas by American Indian tribes. In 1874, the Red River War broke out in the region, when the Comanche, Kiowa, and Southern Cheyenne left their Indian Territory reservation. Attrition and skirmishes by the US Army finally forced the return of the tribes to Indian Territory in June 1875.

In 1891, the United States Congress appointed a commission to meet with the tribal leaders and come to an agreement allowing White settlement. Years of controversy and legal maneuvering ensued before President William McKinley issued a proclamation on 4 July 1901, that gave the federal government control over 2,000,000 acres (8,100 km^{2}) of "surplus" Indian lands that remained after allotments of communal tribal lands to individual households under the Dawes Act. Under other legislation, the United States through the Dawes Commission allotted communal lands as plots to individual households of tribal members, selling off what remained as "surplus". These actions extinguished the tribal claims to communal lands, a condition needed for the admission of Oklahoma as a state in 1907.

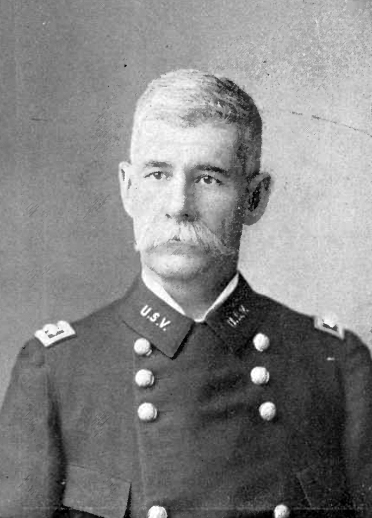
Major General Henry Ware Lawton

After these changes, the legislature of the new state began to organize counties. Three 320-acre sites in Kiowa, Caddo, and Comanche Counties were selected for county seats. Lawton was designated as the Comanche County seat. The town was named for Major General Henry W. Lawton, a quartermaster at Fort Sill, who had taken part in the pursuit and capture of Apache chief Geronimo.

The city was opened to settlement through an auction of town lots beginning on 6 August 1901, which was completed 60 days later. By 25 September 1901, the Rock Island Railroad expanded to Lawton and was soon joined by the Frisco Line. The first city elections were held 24 October 1901.

The United States' entry into World War I accelerated development at Fort Sill and Lawton. The availability of 5 million US gallons (19,000 m^{3}) of water from Lake Lawtonka, just north of Fort Sill, was a catalyst for the War Department to establish a major cantonment named Camp Doniphan. It was active until 1922.

Similarly, the US response in World War II stimulated activity and expansion at Fort Sill and Lawton. The city's population increased from 18,055 to 34,757 from 1940 to 1950. By the 1960s, it had reached 61,697.

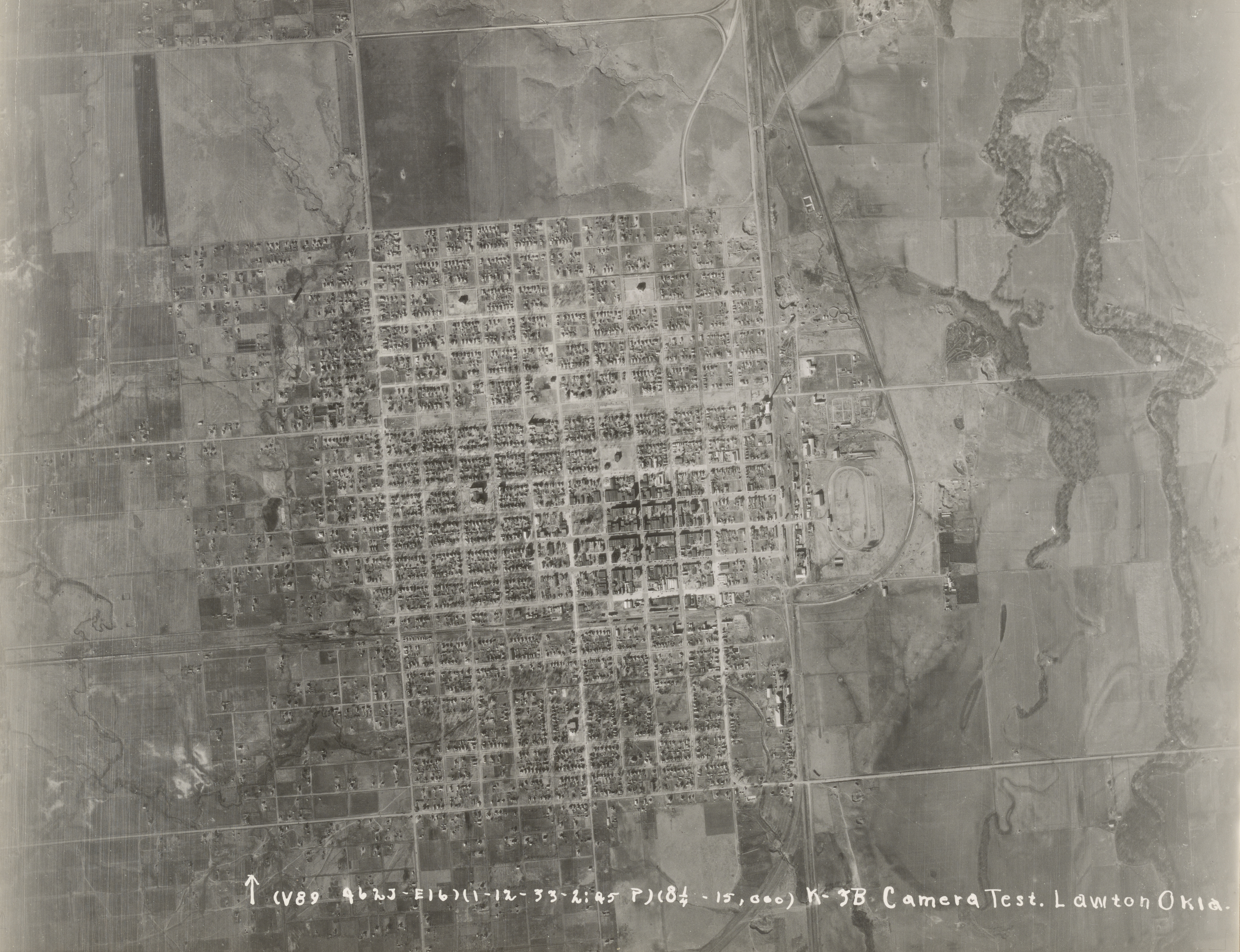
Lawton in 1933

In the postwar period, Lawton underwent tremendous growth during the late 1940s and 1950s, leading city officials to seek additional water sources to supplement existing water from Lake Lawtonka. In the late 1950s, the city purchased large parcels of land along East Cache Creek in northern Comanche County for the construction of a dam and human-made lake, built in 1959 on the creek just north of U.S. 277 west of Elgin. Lake Ellsworth, named for a former Lawton mayor, soft-drink bottler C.R. Ellsworth, was dedicated in the early 1960s. It offered additional water resources, but also recreational opportunities and flood control along Cache Creek.

In 1966, the Lawton City Council annexed several square miles of land on the city's east, northeast, west, and northwest borders, expanding east beyond the East Cache Creek area and west to 82nd Street. In 1964, the north section of the H. E. Bailey Turnpike was completed, connecting Lawton directly to Oklahoma City, the capital. The south section of the turnpike leading to the Texas border was completed on April 23, 1964.

Urban-renewal efforts in the 1970s transformed downtown Lawton. A number of buildings dating to the city's founding were demolished to build an enclosed shopping mall, which was believed to provide a suburban attraction for shoppers.

On June 23, 1998, the city expanded when Lawton annexed neighboring Fort Sill. The Base Realignment and Closure of 2005 resulted in reassignment of people from other bases and consolidation of some military activities at Fort Sill, increasing the number of people assigned there and its scope of activities. Lawton expects a continuing benefit of population and economic growth over the course of the next 20 years.

== Geography ==
The city has a total area of 75.1 sq mi (195 km^{2}), all land. Lawton is located about 84 mi (135 km) southwest of Oklahoma City. Other surrounding cities include Wichita Falls about 47 mi (76 km) to the south, Duncan about 33 mi (53 km) to the east, and Altus about 56 mi (90 km) to the west.

Lawton lies in an area typical of the Great Plains, with prairie, few trees, and flat topography with gently rolling hills. The region north of the city consists of the Wichita Mountains, including Mount Scott and Mount Pinchot, the area's highest peaks. The area consists mostly of Permian limestone on the northern sections of the city.

In the southern sections of the city, Permian Garber sandstone is commonly found with some Hennessey group shale. Area creeks including East Cache Creek contain deposits of Quaternary alluvium. To the northwest, the Wichita Mountains consist primarily of Wichita Granite group from the Cambrian period.

=== Climate ===
Lawton lies in a relatively dry humid subtropical climate (Köppen climate classification Cfa), with frequent variations in weather daily, except during the constantly hot and dry summer. Frequent strong winds, usually from the south or south-southeast during the summer, help to lessen the hotter weather. Northerly winds during the winter can occasionally intensify cold periods.

The average mean temperature for southwest Oklahoma is 62.6 °F (17.0 °C). The summers can be very hot; Lawton averages 31 days with temperatures 100 °F (37.8 °C) and above. The winters are typically mild, though periods of extreme cold can occur. Lawton averages eight days that fail to rise above freezing. The city receives about 31.6 inches (800 mm) of precipitation and less than 3 in (10 cm) of snow annually.

Lawton is located squarely in the area known as Tornado Alley and is prone to severe weather from late April through early June. Most notably, an F4 tornado in 1957, and an F3 tornado in 1979 struck the southern region of the city.

Climate data for Lawton (1991–2020 normals, (Note: Mean monthly maxima and minima (i.e. the highest and lowest temperature readings during an entire month or year) calculated based on data at said location from 1991 to 2020.) extremes 1912–present (Note: Records for Lawton have been kept at the Lawton–Fort Sill Regional Airport since April 1998 and at downtown from July 1912 to March 1998. For more information, see ThreadEx))
| Month | Jan | Feb | Mar | Apr | May | Jun | Jul | Aug | Sep | Oct | Nov | Dec | Year |
|---|---|---|---|---|---|---|---|---|---|---|---|---|---|
| Record high °F (°C) | 85 (29) | 95 (35) | 98 (37) | 100 (38) | 108 (42) | 114 (46) | 114 (46) | 115 (46) | 111 (44) | 104 (40) | 92 (33) | 88 (31) | 115 (46) |
| Mean maximum °F (°C) | 73.8 (23.2) | 79.4 (26.3) | 86.5 (30.3) | 89.9 (32.2) | 96.8 (36.0) | 100.9 (38.3) | 105.4 (40.8) | 104.7 (40.4) | 99.4 (37.4) | 92.0 (33.3) | 81.5 (27.5) | 74.2 (23.4) | 107.1 (41.7) |
| Mean daily maximum °F (°C) | 53.7 (12.1) | 58.0 (14.4) | 66.8 (19.3) | 74.8 (23.8) | 83.2 (28.4) | 92.0 (33.3) | 97.2 (36.2) | 96.4 (35.8) | 87.6 (30.9) | 76.5 (24.7) | 64.1 (17.8) | 54.3 (12.4) | 75.4 (24.1) |
| Daily mean °F (°C) | 40.5 (4.7) | 44.9 (7.2) | 53.7 (12.1) | 61.7 (16.5) | 71.0 (21.7) | 80.0 (26.7) | 84.4 (29.1) | 83.6 (28.7) | 75.1 (23.9) | 63.4 (17.4) | 51.2 (10.7) | 41.7 (5.4) | 62.6 (17.0) |
| Mean daily minimum °F (°C) | 27.4 (−2.6) | 31.9 (−0.1) | 40.5 (4.7) | 48.5 (9.2) | 58.9 (14.9) | 68.1 (20.1) | 71.5 (21.9) | 70.7 (21.5) | 62.6 (17.0) | 50.3 (10.2) | 38.2 (3.4) | 29.1 (−1.6) | 49.8 (9.9) |
| Mean minimum °F (°C) | 12.9 (−10.6) | 17.5 (−8.1) | 22.2 (−5.4) | 32.1 (0.1) | 43.0 (6.1) | 57.3 (14.1) | 63.9 (17.7) | 62.0 (16.7) | 47.5 (8.6) | 33.3 (0.7) | 22.1 (−5.5) | 15.2 (−9.3) | 8.9 (−12.8) |
| Record low °F (°C) | −11 (−24) | −12 (−24) | 6 (−14) | 22 (−6) | 30 (−1) | 45 (7) | 53 (12) | 50 (10) | 35 (2) | 16 (−9) | 11 (−12) | −8 (−22) | −12 (−24) |
| Average precipitation inches (mm) | 1.04 (26) | 0.89 (23) | 1.89 (48) | 2.46 (62) | 3.72 (94) | 3.98 (101) | 2.00 (51) | 3.21 (82) | 2.80 (71) | 2.52 (64) | 1.50 (38) | 1.46 (37) | 27.47 (698) |
| Average snowfall inches (cm) | 1.4 (3.6) | 0.4 (1.0) | 0.0 (0.0) | 0.0 (0.0) | 0.0 (0.0) | 0.0 (0.0) | 0.0 (0.0) | 0.0 (0.0) | 0.0 (0.0) | 0.0 (0.0) | 0.3 (0.76) | 0.2 (0.51) | 2.3 (5.8) |
| Average precipitation days (≥ 0.01 in) | 3.7 | 4.5 | 5.6 | 6.5 | 8.5 | 7.3 | 4.7 | 5.3 | 5.4 | 6.9 | 4.9 | 4.5 | 67.8 |
| Average snowy days (≥ 0.1 in) | 0.3 | 0.2 | 0.0 | 0.0 | 0.0 | 0.0 | 0.0 | 0.0 | 0.0 | 0.0 | 0.1 | 0.1 | 0.7 |
Source 1: NOAA (snow/snow days 1981–2010 (Note: Snowfall data are measured at the weather station in downtown))
Source 2: National Weather Service

== Demographics ==
Historical population
| Census | Pop. | Note | %± |
|---|---|---|---|
| 1910 | 7,788 | | — |
| 1920 | 8,930 | | 14.7% |
| 1930 | 12,121 | | 35.7% |
| 1940 | 18,055 | | 49.0% |
| 1950 | 34,757 | | 92.5% |
| 1960 | 61,697 | | 77.5% |
| 1970 | 74,470 | | 20.7% |
| 1980 | 80,054 | | 7.5% |
| 1990 | 80,561 | | 0.6% |
| 2000 | 92,757 | | 15.1% |
| 2010 | 96,867 | | 4.4% |
| 2020 | 90,381 | | −6.7% |
| 2022 (est.) | 91,542 | | 1.3% |
U.S. Decennial Census; 2018 Estimate

=== Racial and ethnic composition ===
Lawton, Oklahoma – Racial and ethnic composition Note: the US Census treats Hispanic/Latino as an ethnic category. This table excludes Latinos from the racial categories and assigns them to a separate category. Hispanics/Latinos may be of any race.
| Race / Ethnicity (NH = Non-Hispanic) | Pop 2000 | Pop 2010 | Pop 2020 | % 2000 | % 2010 | % 2020 |
|---|---|---|---|---|---|---|
| White alone (NH) | 56,605 | 52,540 | 43,483 | 57.79% | 54.24% | 48.11% |
| Black or African American alone (NH) | 20,937 | 19,848 | 17,554 | 22.57% | 20.49% | 19.42% |
| Native American or Alaska Native alone (NH) | 3,200 | 4,031 | 3,958 | 3.45% | 4.16% | 4.38% |
| Asian alone (NH) | 2,204 | 2,423 | 2,645 | 2.38% | 2.50% | 2.93% |
| Pacific Islander alone (NH) | 388 | 564 | 707 | 0.42% | 0.58% | 0.78% |
| Other race alone (NH) | 165 | 128 | 371 | 0.18% | 0.13% | 0.41% |
| Mixed race or Multiracial (NH) | 3,539 | 5,173 | 7,878 | 3.82% | 5.34% | 8.72% |
| Hispanic or Latino (any race) | 8,719 | 12,160 | 13,785 | 9.40% | 12.55% | 15.25% |
| Total | 92,757 | 96,867 | 90,381 | 100.00% | 100.00% | 100.00% |

=== 2020 census ===
As of the 2020 census, Lawton had a population of 90,381 and a median age of 32.0 years; 23.4% of residents were under 18 and 12.5% were 65 or older. For every 100 females, there were 108.8 males, and for every 100 females 18 and over, there were 110.8 males 18 and over.

Of the 33,354 households in Lawton, 32.0% had children under 18 living in them. Of all households, 39.8% were married-couple households, 22.3% were households with a male householder and no spouse or partner present, and 30.8% were households with a female householder and no spouse or partner present. About 32.0% of all households were made up of individuals and 10.2% had someone living alone who was 65 or older.

The city had 39,894 housing units, of which 16.4% were vacant. Among occupied housing units, 45.3% were owner-occupied and 54.7% were renter-occupied. The homeowner vacancy rate was 3.5%, and the rental vacancy rate was 15.9%. About 94.9% of the residents lived in urban areas, while 5.1% lived in rural areas.

Racial composition as of the 2020 census
| Race | Percentage |
|---|---|
| White | 52.5% |
| Black or African American | 20.4% |
| American Indian and Alaska Native | 5.1% |
| Asian | 3.1% |
| Native Hawaiian and other Pacific Islander | 0.8% |
| Some other race | 4.9% |
| Two or more races | 13.2% |
| Hispanic or Latino (of any race) | 15.3% |

=== 2010 census ===
As of the census of 2010, 96,867 people, 34,901 households, and 22,508 families resided in the city. The population density was 1,195.4 inhabitants per square mile (461.5/km^{2}). The 39,409 housing units averaged 486.3 per square mile (187.8/km^{2}). The racial makeup of the city was 60.3% White, 21.4% African American, 4.7% Native American, 2.6% Asian, 0.3% Pacific Islander, 3.4% from other races, and 4.9% from two or more races. Hispanics or Latinos of any race were 12.6% (7.8% Mexican, 2.8% Puerto Rican, 0.3% Panamanian).

Of the 34,901 households, 36.6% had children under 18 living with them, 43.8% were married couples living together, 15.8% had a female householder with no husband present, and 35.5% were not families. Of all households, 29.4% were made up of individuals, and 2.3% had someone living alone who was 65 or older. The average household size was 2.48, and the average family size was 3.08.

In the city, the population was distributed as 24.9% under 18, 15.3% from 18 to 24, 30.2% from 25 to 44, 20.3% from 45 to 64, and 9.4% who were 65 years of age or older. The median age was 29 years. For every 100 females, there were 108.1 males. For every 100 females 18 and over, there were 110.0 males.

The median income in the city for a household was $41,566 and for a family was $50,507. Males had a median income of $36,440 versus $31,825 for females. The per capita income for the city was $20,655. About 16.6% of families and 19.0% of the population were below the poverty line, including 33.5% of those under 18 and 4.9% of those 65 or over.

== Economy ==
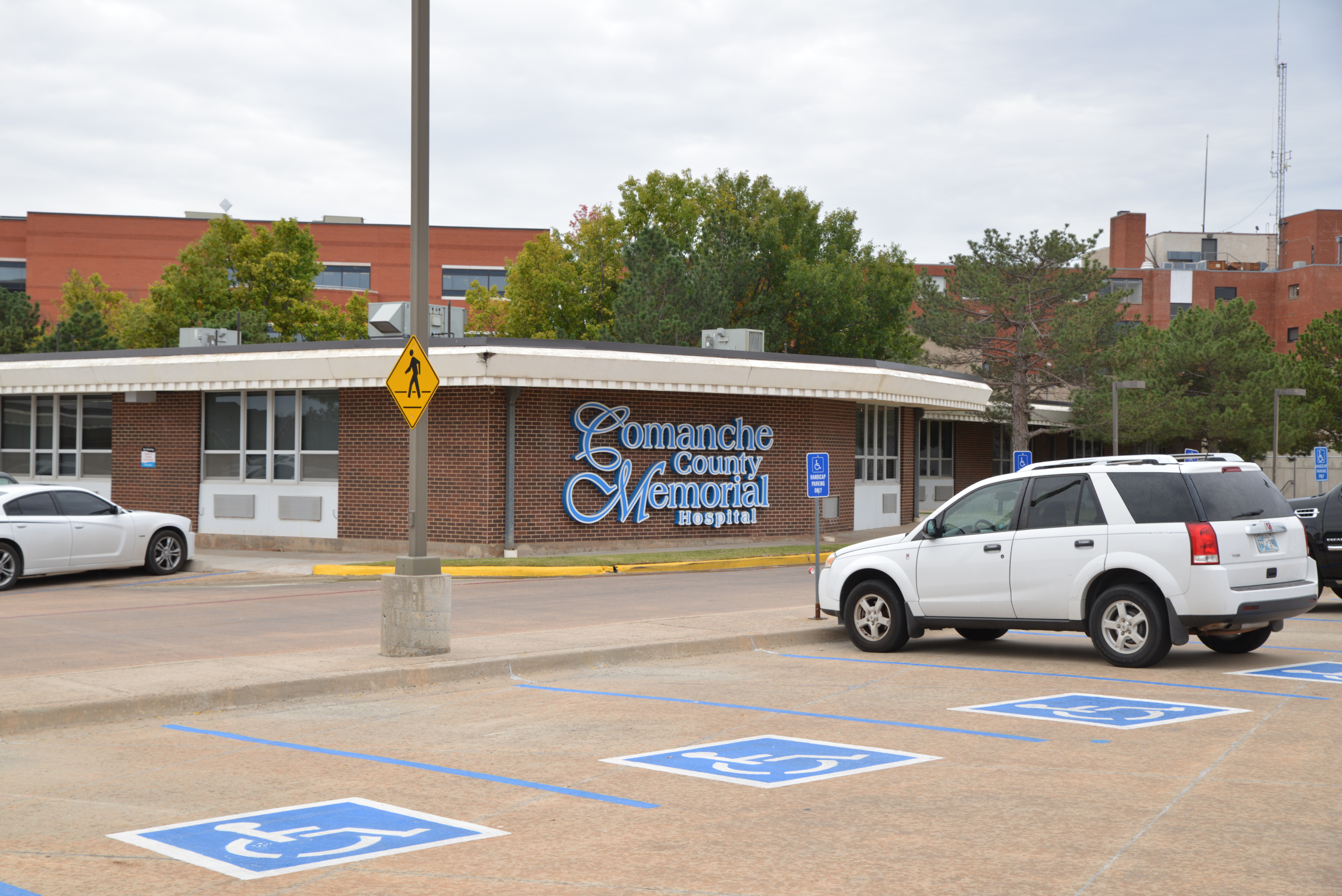
Comanche County Memorial Hospital

Lawton is primarily centered on government, manufacturing, and retail trade industries. The Lawton MSA ranks fourth in Oklahoma with a gross domestic product of $4.2 billion produced in 2008, with a majority ($2.1 billion) in the government sector, primarily associated with the military.

Fort Sill is the largest employer in Lawton, with more than 5,000 full-time employees. In the private sector, the largest employer is Goodyear Tire and Rubber Company with 2,400 full-time employees. Some major employers in the Lawton area also include Lawton Public Schools, Comanche County Memorial Hospital, Southwestern Hospital, City of Lawton, Cameron University, and Bar S Foods.

Lawton has developed two major industrial parks. One is located in the southwest region of the city, while the second is located near the Lawton-Fort Sill Regional Airport.

In 2010, the city of Lawton was engaged in the Downtown Revitalization Project. Its goal was to redesign the areas between Elmer Thomas Park at the north through Central Mall to the south to be more visually appealing and pedestrian friendly to encourage business growth in the area.

Lawton had 35,374 employed civilians as of the 2010 Census, and 49.1% were female. Of the civilian workers, 21,842 (61.7%) were private for-profit wage and salary workers. Of the for-profit wage and salary workers, 659 (1.9% of the total Lawton civilian workforce) were employees of their own corporations. The nonprofit sector had 2,571 (7.3%) private nonprofit wage and salary workers. The government sector included 4,713 (13.3%) federal workers, 2,545 (7.2%) state government workers, and 2,160 (6.1%) local government workers. In addition, the city had 1,634 (4.6%) self-employed workers and unpaid family workers.

It was announced in May of 2025 that Firehawk Aerospace was constructing a $22 million rocket fuel production facility in the town’s west industrial park, creating 100 jobs.

== Arts and culture ==
=== Events and festivals ===
In May, Lawton Arts for All, Inc hosts the Arts for All Festival. The festival includes several judged art competitions, as well as live entertainment. The festival is typically held at Shepler Park. In late September, The International Festival is held in the city. Founded in 1979, the event showcases the many different cultures, arts, and music of the community.

=== Museums ===
Lawton has three public museums. The Museum of the Great Plains is dedicated to natural history and early settlement of the Great Plains, particularly by European Americans. Outdoor exhibits include a replica of the Red River Trading Post, the original Blue Beaver schoolhouse, and Elgin Train Depot with a Frisco locomotive.

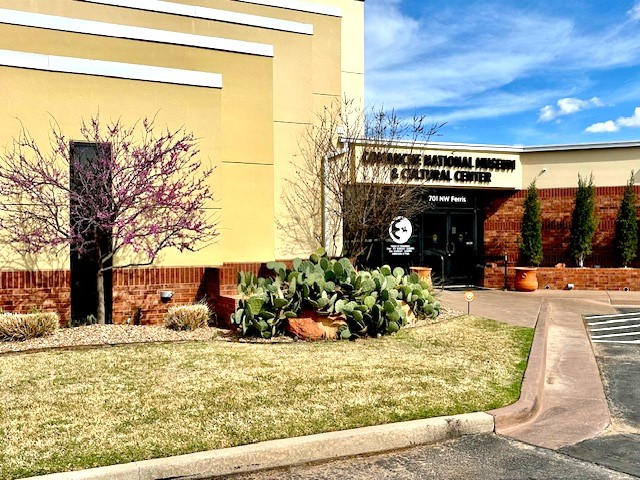
Comanche National Museum and Cultural Center in Lawton, 3-2025

The Fort Sill Museum, located on the military base of the same name, includes the old Fort Sill corral and several period buildings, including the old post guardhouse, chapel, and barracks. It also features several artillery pieces. The old fort is designated as a National Historic Landmark.

The Comanche National Museum and Cultural Center, operated by the Comanche Nation Tribe, focuses on exhibits and art relating to the Comanche culture. The museum also hosts traveling American Indian exhibitions from the Smithsonian Institution, Michigan State University Museum, and Chicago's Field Museum.

=== Historic structures ===
The National Register of Historic Places for Lawton lists the Mattie Beal House, the Carnegie Library, the First Christian Church, the First Presbyterian Church of Lawton, the Mahoney-Clark House, and the Methodist Episcopal Church, South. Old Fort Sill has been designated as a National Historic Landmark, the highest classification.

== Sports ==
Lawton was the former home to the Lawton-Fort Sill Cavalry, a basketball team. The team moved in 2007 from Oklahoma City to Lawton, where they won two Continental Basketball Association championships and a Premier Basketball League championship. In 2011, the Cavalry ceased operations in their second year in the PBL.

== Parks and recreation ==
Lawton operates 80 parks and recreation areas in varying sizes, including the largest - Elmer Thomas Park.

The Lawton branch of the YMCA offers a wide variety of recreational programs to members, and the Lawton Country Club maintains an 18-hole, par 71 golf course. Recreation can also be found in many amateur leagues, including adult softball, youth baseball, soccer, softball, and volleyball.

== Government ==
City government:
| Mayor | Stan Booker |
| Ward 1 | Mary Ann Hankins |
| Ward 2 | R.L. Smith |
| Ward 3 | Linda Chapman |
| Ward 4 | George Gill |
| Ward 5 | Allan Hampton |
| Ward 6 | Robert Weger |
| Ward 7 | Sherene L. Williams |
| Ward 8 | Randy Warren |

Lawton uses the council–manager model of municipal government. The city's primary authority resides in the city council, which approves ordinances, resolutions, and contracts. The city is divided into eight wards, or single-member districts. Each ward elects a single city council representative for a three-year term. The mayor, who is elected at-large every three years, presides and sets the agenda of the city council, but is primarily ceremonial as a head of government. The administrative day-to-day operation of the city is headed by the City Manager, who is appointed by the City Council. As of January 2024, the mayor of Lawton was Stan Booker. As of June 2025, the city manager was John Ratliff.

Lawton is the county seat of Comanche County and houses county offices and courts. Three elected commissioners serving four-year terms manage the county government.

At the federal level, Lawton lies in Oklahoma's 4th congressional district, represented by Tom Cole. In the state senate, Lawton is in District 31 (Spencer Kern) and 32 (Dusty Deevers). In the House, District 62 (Daniel Pae), 63 (Trey Caldwell), and 64 (Rande Worthen) cover the city.

== Education ==
=== Higher education ===
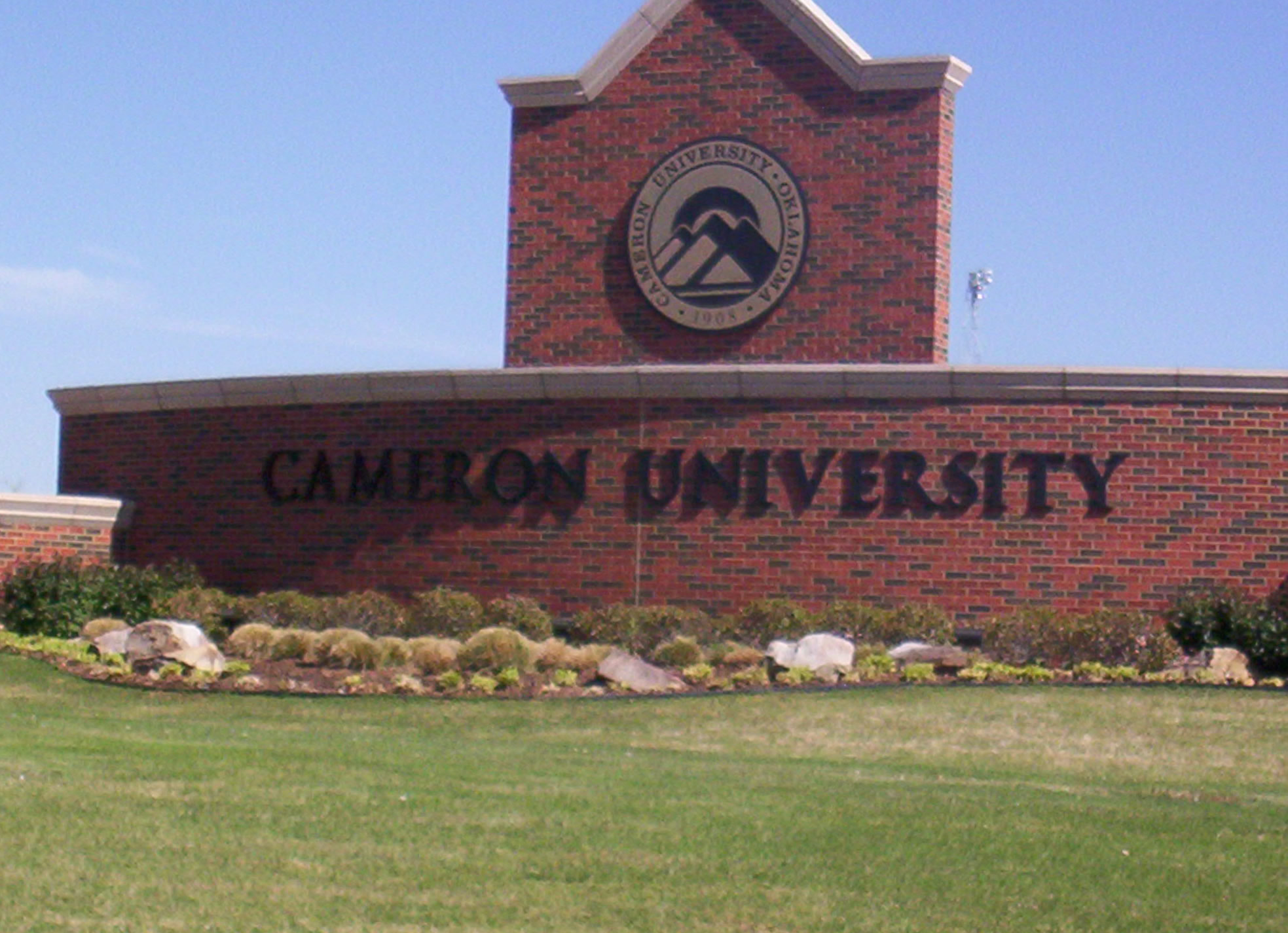
Cameron University

Cameron University is the largest four-year, state-funded university in southwest Oklahoma, offering more than 50 degree programs in areas of business, education, liberal arts, and science and technology. Founded in 1909, Cameron has an average fall enrollment of 6,000 students, with 70 endowed faculty positions. Other colleges in Lawton include Comanche Nation College. Founded in 2004, the college provides lower-division programs and educational opportunities in higher education for the Comanche Nation and the public.

Lawton is also served by the Great Plains Technology Center, which is part of the Oklahoma Department of Career and Technology Education system. Great Plains provides occupational education, training, and development opportunities to area residents.

=== Primary and secondary schools ===
Lawton Public Schools serve most of the city of Lawton. The district operates two prekindergarten centers, 24 elementary schools, three middle schools, and three high schools – Eisenhower, Lawton, and MacArthur. In 2008, Lawton Public Schools had an enrollment of about 16,000 students with about 1,000 teachers. Two independent districts, Bishop and Flower Mound, serve portions of Lawton. Bishop operates a single pre-K–6 elementary campus and Flower Mound has a pre-K–5 campus. Secondary students living in these districts attend Lawton Public Schools.

A small portion of far-west Lawton is served by Cache Public Schools. Some portions of the city limits are in Geronimo Public Schools.

Other schools in Lawton include Trinity Christian Academy, Lawton Academy of Arts and Science, and Lawton Christian School. Trinity Christian Academy offers classes from kindergarten to grade 8. Lawton Academy of Arts and Sciences and Lawton Christian has the city's only two private independent high schools. Lawton Christian, founded in 1976, offers education from prekindergarten through the 12th grade, and has a student body of 426 students. Another private school - St. Mary's Catholic School - closed in 2020 after more than 100 years of operation.

== Media ==
The Lawton Constitution, the only daily newspaper published in Lawton, has a circulation of 30,000. In addition, the Fort Sill newspaper, The Cannoneer, is published weekly primarily for military personnel; The Cameron Collegian has as its main audience Cameron University students. Additionally, Okie Magazine is a monthly magazine that focuses on news and entertainment in the Southwest Oklahoma area.

Radio stations in Lawton include two AM stations – CBS Sports Radio affiliate KKRX (1380) and urban adult contemporary station KXCA (1050) – and 15 FM stations – including NPR member KCCU (89.3), country stations KFXI (92.1) and KLAW (101.3), rock music station KZCD (94.1), Hot AC station KMGZ (95.3), urban contemporary outlet KJMZ (97.9), and CHR station KVRW (107.3).

Lawton is part of a bistate media market that also includes the nearby, larger city of Wichita Falls, Texas; the market, which encompasses six counties in southwestern Oklahoma and 10 counties in western North Texas, has 152,950 households with at least one television set, making it the 148th-largest in the nation as of the 2016–2017 season, according to Nielsen Media Research. KSWO-TV (channel 7), an ABC affiliate (which also carries affiliations with MeTV and Telemundo on digital subchannels), is the only broadcast television station in the market that is licensed to Lawton, and its local news programming maintains a primary focus on southwestern Oklahoma in its coverage. All other major stations in the area, including KFDX-TV (channel 3; NBC, with The CW on its third digital subchannel), KAUZ-TV (channel 6; CBS, which is a sister station to KSWO through a shared services agreement but maintains separate operations on the Texas side of the market), and KJTL (channel 18; Fox), are based in Wichita Falls.

== Infrastructure ==
=== Transportation ===
Lawton is primarily served by Interstate 44, designated as the H. E. Bailey Turnpike. It connects the city to Oklahoma City to the northeast and to Wichita Falls, Texas, to the south. The city is also connected by US Highway 62, which connects to the regional towns of Altus to the west and Anadarko to the north. Other major thoroughfares include US Highway 277 and 281, which parallels the H. E. Bailey Turnpike to Wichita Falls to the south and leads to regional towns of Anadarko and Chickasha, respectively, to the north, and OK-7, which connects Lawton to Duncan.

While the days of the Lawton Railway trolley are far behind it, Lawton is currently served by the Lawton Area Transit System ("LATS"), which provides public transit for both Lawton and Fort Sill. Founded in 2002, LATS had a ridership of 427,088 in 2009, and provides five major routes throughout the city.

Intercity bus service is available from Greyhound Lines, and was previously offered by Jefferson Lines.

By air, Lawton is served by the Lawton-Fort Sill Regional Airport (LAW, KLAW). At present, it offers daily American Eagle flights to Dallas/Fort Worth International Airport and is also used for military transport.

=== Health care ===
Lawton has three major hospitals in the area. The largest, Comanche County Memorial Hospital, is a 283-bed, nonprofit hospital that employs 250 physicians. Southwestern Medical Center is a 199-bed hospital with a staff of 150 physicians. In addition, the Indian Health Service Lawton Indian Hospital is located in the city to provide health services for the large American Indian population. It has 26 beds with a staff of 23 physicians.

== Notable people ==
=== Musicians and authors ===
- Don Blanding, (1894 - 1957), poet, cartoonist, author
- C. J. Cherryh, (b. 1942) Hugo Award-winning science fiction writer
- Olivebelle Hamon, (1909 - 1987), child musical prodigy and heiress
- Conrad Herwig (b. 1959) jazz trombonist
- Stephen Hillenburg, (1961 - 2018) SpongeBob SquarePants creator
- N. Scott Momaday, Pulitzer Prize-winning author
- Leon Russell, (1942 - 2016) American musician and songwriter
- Bryan White, country music singer
- Kelly Willis, country music singer

=== Political leaders ===
- Randy Bass Democratic state senator, former MLB and NPB first baseman
- Scott Ferris, U.S. representative
- Thomas Gore, U.S. senator
- L. M. Gensman, Elmer Thomas
- Gregory A. Miller, an attorney and politician was born at Fort Sill in 1962, where his father, Ralph R. Miller, was stationed. Ralph Miller was a state representative from St. Charles Parish from 1968 to 1980 and 1982 to 1992.
- Julian Niemczyk US ambassador to Czechoslovakia (born on Fort Sill)
- T.W. Shannon, speaker of the Oklahoma House of Representatives
- Paul Taliaferro, Democratic State Senator
- Heck Thomas, law enforcement officer who in 1896 captured the outlaw Bill Doolin, the founder of the Wild Bunch gang, spent his later years as the first elected police chief in Lawton.

=== Other notable people ===
- Grady Brewer, 2006 contender, champion boxer
- Marty Brown, Buffalo Bisons manager and former MLB infielder
- Charles Chibitty, World War II Comanche code talker
- Joan Crawford, Academy Award-winning actress
- Vickie Gates, professional bodybuilder
- Rance Hood, Native American artist
- Butch Huskey, former MLB outfielder
- Robert S. Johnson, WWII ace
- Tom Jordan, former MLB catcher
- Tomassa (c. 1840–1900), translator
- Stacey King, three-time NBA champion
- Hellen Linkswiler, dietician and nutrition scientist
- Sam Maddux Jr., American Air Force lieutenant general and commander
- Louise Davis McMahon (1873–1966), philanthropist
- Lauren Nelson, Miss America 2007
- Ralph McT. Pennell, U.S. Army major general, retired in Lawton
- Michael Ray Richardson, former NBA All-Star
- Jason Rouser, 1996 Olympic gold medalist
- Will Shields NFL Pro Bowlers and Jammal Brown
- Kelly Stinnett, former MLB catcher
- Charles Thompson, motivational speaker and former University of Oklahoma quarterback
- Donald R. Wilton, electrical engineering professor at University of Houston and National Academy of Engineering member
- Sunny Anderson, television personality
