= Jermelle Cudjo =

American football player (born 1986)

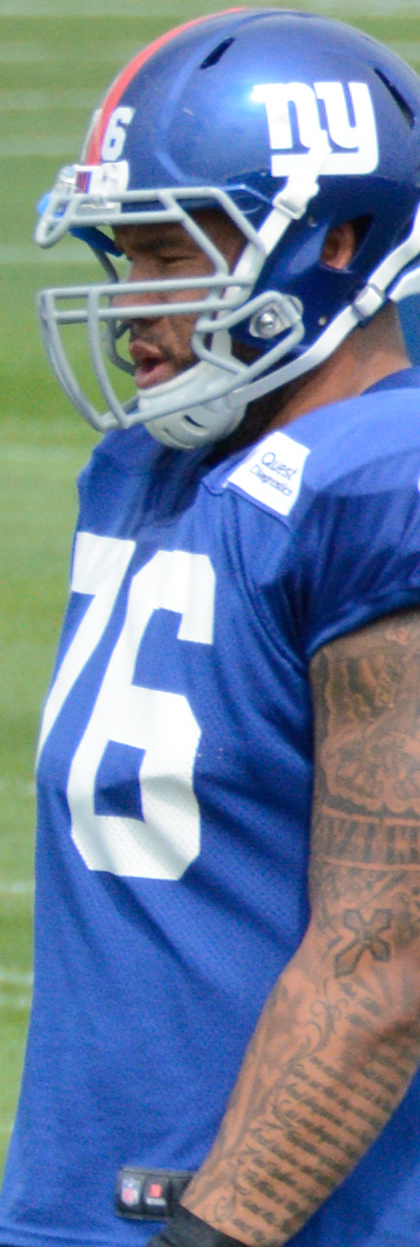
- Cudjo in 2016

No. 93, 99
- Position: Defensive tackle

Personal information
- Born: September 28, 1986 (age 40); Lawton, Oklahoma, U.S.
- Listed height: 6 ft 2 in (1.88 m)
- Listed weight: 298 lb (135 kg)

Career information
- High school: Lawton (OK) MacArthur
- College: Central Oklahoma
- NFL draft: 2010: undrafted

Career history
- St. Louis Rams (2010–2013); Kansas City Chiefs (2014)*; Detroit Lions (2015); New York Giants (2016)*
- * Offseason or practice squad member only

Awards and highlights
- 2× First-team All-Lone Star North (2007, 2008); Second-team All-Lone Star North (2009)

Career NFL statistics
- Total tackles: 52
- Sacks: 1.5
- Pass deflections: 3
- Stats at Pro Football Reference

Jermelle Cudjo (born September 28, 1986) is an American former professional football player who was a defensive tackle in the National Football League (NFL). He played college football at Central Oklahoma. He has played for the St. Louis Rams, Kansas City Chiefs, and New York Giants.

== Early life ==
Cudjo was a standout at MacArthur High School. He was a two-time Lawton Constitution All-Area pick and an All-State selection as a senior.

== College career ==
At the University of Central Oklahoma Cudjo was a three-time All-Conference selection (twice First-team, once Second-team). He finished with 198 tackles (38.5 for losses) and 12 sacks.

As a freshman (2005) at the University of Central Oklahoma, Cudjo redshirted. In 2006 as a redshirt freshman he made 33 tackles with four for loss in 11 games played. He blocked a total of six kicks on the season while adding half of a sack and two fumble recoveries (one for a touchdown). In 2007, as a sophomore, Cudjo made 47 tackles, 6.5 tackles for loss, and had 3.5 sacks and was named First-team All-Lone Star North. In 2008, during his junior year, he broke through with 60 tackles, 15.5 for loss with 4.5 sacks and was named First-team All-Lone Star North. He followed that up with 58 tackles with 12.5 for loss and 3.5 sacks as a senior in 2009 and was voted as a Second-team All-Lone Star North.

After his senior season Cudjo played at the Cactus Bowl, the NCAA Division II All Star game in Kingsville, Texas.

== Professional career ==
Pre-draft measurables
Height	Weight	40-yard dash	20-yard shuttle	Three-cone drill	Vertical jump	Broad jump	Bench press	Wonderlic
6 ft 2 in (1.88 m)	293 lb (133 kg)	5.10 s	4.58 s	7.42 s	30 in (0.76 m)	8 ft 8 in (2.64 m)	24 reps	x
All values from Central OK Pro Day

=== St. Louis Rams ===
Cudjo was signed as a free agent and made the Rams 53-man opening day roster. He was released on May 15, 2014.

=== Kansas City Chiefs ===
Cudjo signed with the Kansas City Chiefs during the 2014 offseason, but was released on August 25, 2014.

=== Detroit Lions ===
Cudjo signed with the Detroit Lions on January 9, 2015. Cudjo made the 53 man roster out of training camp.

=== New York Giants ===
On July 29, 2016, Cudjo signed with the Giants. On September 3, 2016, he was released by the Giants.
