= Cache High School =

School in Cache, Oklahoma, United States

Coordinates: 34°37′23″N 98°37′30″W

Location
- 204 West H Avenue; Cache, Comanche County, Oklahoma 73527; United States

Information
- Type: Co-educational, public, secondary
- Established: 1902
- School district: Cache Public Schools
- Authority: Oklahoma State Department of Education
- Principal: Melanie Nungesser
- Staff: 38.21 (FTE)
- Grades: 9-12
- Enrollment: 656 (2023–2024)
- Student to teacher ratio: 17.17
- Colors: Red and white
- Athletics conference: 4A District 1
- Sports: Baseball, basketball, cheerleading, cross country, football, golf, powerlifting, soccer, softball, track, volleyball
- Mascot: Bulldog
- Website: Cache High School

Cache High School is a secondary school located within Comanche County in Cache, Oklahoma, United States. It is a part of Cache Public Schools.

== Extra-curricular activities ==
State championships

- 2013 Oklahoma 5A State Champions, girls' slow-pitch softball
- 2010 Oklahoma 4A State Champions, girls' basketball
- 2010 Oklahoma 4A State Champions, girls' volleyball
- 1991 Oklahoma 2A State Champions, academic team

== Notable alumni ==
- Beverly Johnson Horse (class of 1949), teacher and activist
- Madison Ryann Ward (class of 2012), outside hitter for Oklahoma Sooners women's volleyball and gospel singer
