= Lake Ellsworth Addition, Oklahoma =

Unincorporated community in Oklahoma, US

- Census-designated place
- Location within Oklahoma Location within the United States
- Coordinates: 34°50′13″N 98°19′17″W
- Country: United States
- State: Oklahoma
- County: Comanche

Area
  - Total: 0.25 sq mi (0.65 km^{2})
  - Land: 0.25 sq mi (0.65 km^{2})
  - Water: 0 sq mi (0.00 km^{2})
- Elevation: 1,270 ft (390 m)

Population (2020)
  - Total: 223
  - Density: 883/sq mi (340.9/km^{2})
- Time zone: UTC-6 (Central (CST))
  - Summer (DST): UTC-5 (CDT)
- ZIP Code: 73006 (Apache)
- Area code: 580
- FIPS code: 40-40875
- GNIS feature ID: 2812848

Lake Ellsworth Addition is a census-designated place (CDP) in Comanche County, Oklahoma, United States. As of the 2020 census, Lake Ellsworth Addition had a population of 223. It was first listed as a CDP prior to the 2020 census.

The CDP is in northern Comanche County, to the northeast of Lake Ellsworth, an impoundment on East Cache Creek, a south-flowing tributary of the Red River. It sits just north of the lake's Tony Creek inlet. It is 6 miles (10 km) southeast of Apache, 5 miles (8 km) west-northwest of Fletcher, and 5 miles (8 km) north of Elgin.

== Demographics ==
Historical population
Census	Pop.	Note	%±
2020	223		—
U.S. Decennial Census

=== 2020 census ===
As of the 2020 census, Lake Ellsworth Addition had a population of 223. The median age was 41.3 years. 22.4% of residents were under the age of 18 and 21.1% of residents were 65 years of age or older. For every 100 females there were 75.6 males, and for every 100 females age 18 and over there were 61.7 males age 18 and over.

0.0% of residents lived in urban areas, while 100.0% lived in rural areas.

There were 91 households in Lake Ellsworth Addition, of which 29.7% had children under the age of 18 living in them. Of all households, 36.3% were married-couple households, 20.9% were households with a male householder and no spouse or partner present, and 30.8% were households with a female householder and no spouse or partner present. About 31.9% of all households were made up of individuals and 15.4% had someone living alone who was 65 years of age or older.

There were 118 housing units, of which 22.9% were vacant. The homeowner vacancy rate was 3.7% and the rental vacancy rate was 0.0%.

Racial composition as of the 2020 census
Race	Number	Percent
White	172	77.1%
Black or African American	4	1.8%
American Indian and Alaska Native	31	13.9%
Asian	0	0.0%
Native Hawaiian and Other Pacific Islander	0	0.0%
Some other race	1	0.4%
Two or more races	15	6.7%
Hispanic or Latino (of any race)	13	5.8%
