= Codey McElroy =

American football player (born 1992)

Profile
- Position: Tight end

Personal information
- Born: December 13, 1992 (age 33); Chattanooga, Oklahoma, U.S.
- Listed height: 6 ft 6 in (1.98 m)
- Listed weight: 255 lb (116 kg)

Career information
- High school: Chattanooga (Chattanooga, Oklahoma)
- College: Southeastern Oklahoma State (2017)
- NFL draft: 2018: undrafted

Career history
- Los Angeles Rams (2018)*; Dallas Cowboys (2019)*; Tampa Bay Buccaneers (2019–2021)
- * Offseason or practice squad member only

Awards and highlights
- Super Bowl champion (LV); Second-team All-GAC (2017)

Career NFL statistics
- Receptions: 1
- Receiving yards: 30
- Stats at Pro Football Reference

Codey Joe McElroy (born December 13, 1992) is an American professional football tight end. He played college football at Southeastern Oklahoma State. He also played college baseball at Cameron University and the University of Texas and professionally in the Atlanta Braves organization and college basketball at Oklahoma State.

== Early life ==
McElroy grew up in Frederick, Oklahoma, and attended Chattanooga High School in Chattanooga, Oklahoma, where he played baseball and basketball, but did not play football as the school was too small to field a team. He was a preseason All-State selection in basketball as a senior and averaged 18.7 points per game before suffering a season ending injury after 14 games. In baseball, he hit .578 with 10 doubles, 15 home runs and 52 RBIs and was named first-team All-State and a First-team All-American by Louisville Slugger.

== College and professional baseball career ==
McElroy started out playing junior college baseball at Eastern Oklahoma State College, where he batted .276 with eight home runs and 33 RBI in 59 games. Following the season, he transferred to the University of Texas for his sophomore year. He started 16 games at shortstop, but batted .161 and opted to transfer to Division II Cameron University in order to be closer to home. In his only season with the Aggies, McElroy hit .318 with seven home runs and a team leading 31 RBI and was named first-team All-Lone Star Conference. He was drafted in the 19th round of the 2014 Major League Baseball draft by the Atlanta Braves at the end of the season. After batting .242 with the Rookie League Danville Braves McElroy was promoted to the Single-A Rome Braves towards the end of the 2014 season and batted .217. He decided to walk away from baseball after batting .168 through 32 games played the next season with Rome.

Following the end of his baseball career, McElroy enrolled at Oklahoma State University–Stillwater to finish his college coursework. He joined the men's basketball team as a walk-on, playing five minutes over four games and no points scored in his only season. McElroy spent a year as an assistant baseball coach at Wichita State University before deciding to enroll at Southeastern Oklahoma State University in order to prepare for a career in the oil industry. He also walked on to the football team as a tight end despite not having played since middle school, catching 14 passes for 173 yards and five touchdowns in nine games.

== Professional career ==
Pre-draft measurables
| Height | Weight | 20-yard shuttle | Three-cone drill | Vertical jump | Broad jump | Bench press |
|---|---|---|---|---|---|---|
| 6 ft 6 1/8 in (1.98 m) | 254 lb (115 kg) | 4.47 s | 7.28 s | 32.5 in (0.83 m) | 10 ft 2 in (3.10 m) | 21 reps |
All values from Pro Day

=== Los Angeles Rams ===
McElroy was signed by the Los Angeles Rams as an undrafted free agent on May 15, 2018, after participating in a rookie tryout. He was waived by the Rams during final roster cuts.

=== Dallas Cowboys ===
McElroy was signed by the Dallas Cowboys on March 11, 2019. He was originally place on injured reserve during training camp, but was waived with an injury settlement on September 4.

=== Tampa Bay Buccaneers ===
McElroy was signed to the Tampa Bay Buccaneers practice squad on October 30, 2019, after working out for the team earlier in the season. The Buccaneers promoted McElroy to their active roster on December 19. McElroy made his NFL debut on December 21, against the Houston Texans, catching a 30-yard pass from Jameis Winston for his first career reception.

On September 5, 2020, McElroy was waived by the Buccaneers. He was re-signed to their practice squad on October 12. McElroy spent the rest of the season on the practice squad as the Buccaneers won Super Bowl LV against the Kansas City Chiefs. On February 9, 2021, McElroy re-signed with the Buccaneers.

On August 31, 2021, McElroy was waived by the Buccaneers and re-signed to the practice squad the next day. After the Buccaneers were eliminated in the Divisional Round of the 2021 playoffs, he signed a reserve/future contract on January 24, 2022. He was waived by the Buccaneers on July 26.
