= Oklahoma State Highway 17 =

State highway in Oklahoma, United States

State Highway 17

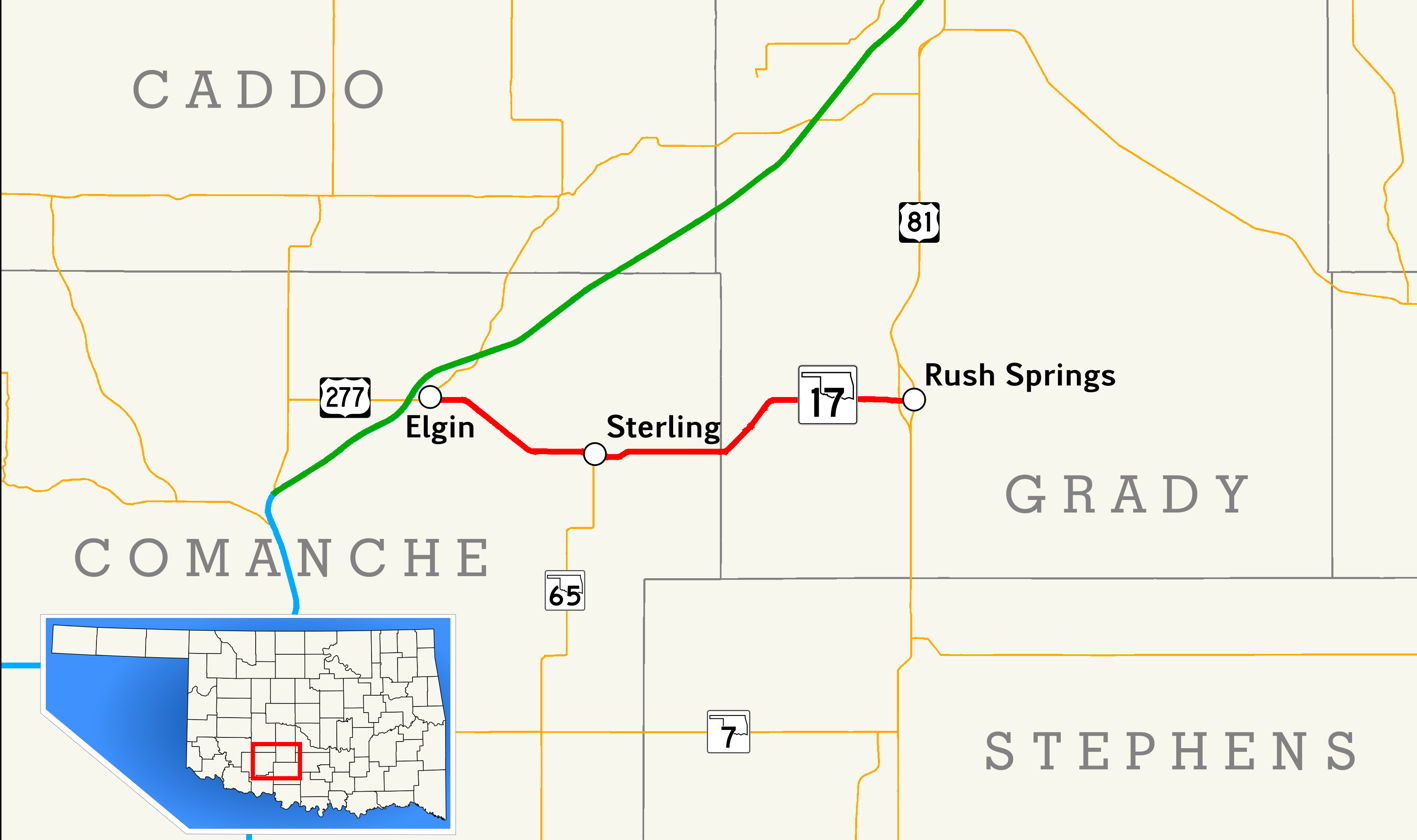

Route information
- Maintained by ODOT
- Length: 20.86 mi (33.57 km)
- Existed: ca. 1936–present

Major junctions
- West end: US 277 in Elgin
- US 81 in Rush Springs
- East end: US 81 Bus. in Rush Springs

Location
- Country: United States
- State: Oklahoma

Highway system
- Oklahoma State Highway System; Interstate; US; State; Turnpikes
← SH-16	→ SH-17A

State Highway 17, abbreviated as SH-17, is an east–west highway in Oklahoma. It is a relatively short highway, extending for only 20.86 miles (33.57 km) from U.S. Highway 277 (US-277) in Elgin to Business US-81 in Rush Springs. It has no lettered spur routes (it does not connect to SH-17A in Wynnewood).

SH-17 was first established as a state highway, connecting Sterling to Rush Springs, in the mid-1930s. It was later extended west over a portion of SH-65, bringing its western terminus to Elgin.

== Route description ==
SH-17 begins at U.S. Highway 277 in the north-central part of Elgin. SH-17 proceeds due east out of town for approximately 1 1/2 miles (2.4 km) before turning southeast. Around 2 1/2 miles (4.0 km) west of Sterling, the route returns to a due east course, then curves slightly to the south as it enters town. On the west side of town, SH-17 serves as the northern terminus of SH-65, which follows 5th Avenue southward out of town. SH-17 continues east through Sterling along Main Street.

East of Sterling, SH-17 crosses Beaver Creek near its source. About five miles (8.0 km) east of SH-65, SH-17 crosses the Comanche–Grady county line. The route then turns northeast, turning back east to follow the same line of latitude it originally followed in Elgin. The highway passes south of the ghost town of Acme. On the west side of Rush Springs, it intersects the US-81 expressway bypass of the town. SH-17 then continues east along Blakeley Avenue into downtown Rush Springs, where it ends at US-81's Rush Springs business loop.

== History ==
The present-day State Highway 17 was commissioned between May 1936 and April 1937. Originally, the all-dirt highway began in Sterling and ran to Rush Springs; the Sterling–Elgin portion of the highway was at that time part of SH-65. However, at some point between April 1937 and April 1938, SH-65 was truncated to the south, and SH-17 was extended west to Elgin along the former route of SH-65. No further changes have been made to SH-17's route since.

== Junction list ==
County	Location	mi	km	Destinations	Notes
Comanche	Elgin	0.0	0.0	US 277	Western terminus
Comanche	Sterling	7.4	11.9	SH-65	Northern terminus of SH-65
Grady	Rush Springs	20.3	32.7	US 81	
Grady	Rush Springs	20.9	33.6	US 81 Bus.	Eastern terminus
1.000 mi = 1.609 km; 1.000 km = 0.621 mi
