= Lakeside Village, Oklahoma =

Unincorporated community in Oklahoma, US

- Census-designated place
- Location within Oklahoma Location within the United States
- Coordinates: 34°47′58″N 98°22′26″W
- Country: United States
- State: Oklahoma
- County: Comanche

Area
  - Total: 0.38 sq mi (0.98 km^{2})
  - Land: 0.28 sq mi (0.73 km^{2})
  - Water: 0.10 sq mi (0.26 km^{2})
- Elevation: 1,263 ft (385 m)

Population (2020)
  - Total: 162
  - Density: 575.3/sq mi (222.12/km^{2})
- Time zone: UTC-6 (Central (CST))
  - Summer (DST): UTC-5 (CDT)
- ZIP Code: 73538 (Elgin)
- Area code: 580
- FIPS code: 40-41050
- GNIS feature ID: 2812850

Lakeside Village is a census-designated place (CDP) in Comanche County, Oklahoma, United States. It was first listed as a CDP prior to the 2020 census. As of the 2020 census, Lakeside Village had a population of 162.

The CDP is in northern Comanche County, on the west side of Lake Ellsworth, on the south side of its Chandler Creek inlet. It is bordered to the west by U.S. Routes 62/281 and is 14 miles (23 km) north of Lawton and 7 miles (11 km) south of Apache. Via U.S. Route 277, it is 7 miles west-northwest of Elgin.

Lake Ellsworth is an impoundment on East Cache Creek, a south-flowing tributary of the Red River.

== Demographics ==
Historical population
Census	Pop.	Note	%±
2020	162		—
U.S. Decennial Census

=== 2020 census ===
As of the 2020 census, Lakeside Village had a population of 162. The median age was 39.5 years. 21.0% of residents were under the age of 18 and 21.0% of residents were 65 years of age or older. For every 100 females there were 107.7 males, and for every 100 females age 18 and over there were 106.5 males age 18 and over.

0.0% of residents lived in urban areas, while 100.0% lived in rural areas.

There were 66 households in Lakeside Village, of which 43.9% had children under the age of 18 living in them. Of all households, 56.1% were married-couple households, 16.7% were households with a male householder and no spouse or partner present, and 22.7% were households with a female householder and no spouse or partner present. About 21.2% of all households were made up of individuals and 6.0% had someone living alone who was 65 years of age or older.

There were 97 housing units, of which 32.0% were vacant. The homeowner vacancy rate was 2.0% and the rental vacancy rate was 5.0%.

Racial composition as of the 2020 census
Race	Number	Percent
White	106	65.4%
Black or African American	5	3.1%
American Indian and Alaska Native	15	9.3%
Asian	0	0.0%
Native Hawaiian and Other Pacific Islander	1	0.6%
Some other race	12	7.4%
Two or more races	23	14.2%
Hispanic or Latino (of any race)	23	14.2%

== Education ==
The school district is Elgin Public Schools. Its comprehensive high school is Elgin High School.
