= Madison Ryann Ward =

American singer (born 1995)

- Born: September 16, 1994 (age 31); Lawton, Oklahoma, U.S.
- Genres: Gospel, R&B
- Occupations: Singer, songwriter
- Years active: 2017–present
- Website: madisonryannward.com

Madison Ryann Ward (born September 16, 1994) is an American singer-songwriter from Lawton, Oklahoma. She writes contemporary Christian music songs blending pop, R&B, gospel, blues, and folk influences. A former volleyball player for the University of Oklahoma, she gained recognition after a viral video of her singing "Chain of Fools". She later signed with Rick Rubin's American Recordings in partnership with Republic Records and released her debut single, Mirror (2018).

== Early life ==
Ward was born in Lawton, Oklahoma, to a church pianist mother and a father who owned a barbecue restaurant that hosted blues and soul musicians, exposing her to church music alongside secular soul and folk traditions.

Ward graduated from Cache High School in Cache, Oklahoma, in 2012. As a high school senior, Ward was named Athlete of the Year by the Oklahoma Secondary School Activities Association.

== College volleyball career ==
Ward enrolled at the University of Oklahoma in 2012. She was a 6-foot-1 outside hitter for Oklahoma Sooners women's volleyball from 2012 to 2016. Due to a season-ending injury, she was granted a medical redshirt in 2012. Ward then had a breakout season in 2013, with 20 matches started and All-Big 12 Freshman honors. She was also unanimously voted to the All-Big 12 first team in 2014. In five seasons, Ward had 961 kills and 195 blocks in 369 sets played.

Ward graduated from Oklahoma's Gaylord College of Journalism and Mass Communication in 2017 with a bachelor's degree in creative media production.

== Music career ==
In the summer of 2015, Ward recorded a video of herself singing the Aretha Franklin song "Chain of Fools" at a University of Oklahoma dining hall. That video quickly attracted attention on Twitter, having been shared by WorldStarHipHop and NFL wide receiver Chad Johnson.

After graduating from Oklahoma, Ward moved to Nashville to start a music career. Signing with American Recordings, Ward released debut single "Mirror" in 2018; she performed part of the song while interviewed by David Letterman on My Guest Needs No Introduction.

Working with producer Rick Rubin, Ward released EP Beyond Me in 2019 through American Recordings.

Ward and Rubin parted ways by 2023, and she founded the independent imprint Zelda House Records. She issued a series of devotional-leaning singles, included on her first full-length album, A New Thing (2023). She released her next album, Purified Love, in 2024, featuring gospel songs blending elements of folk, soul, and pop.

In 2024, PBS broadcast an episode of Recorded Live at Analog with Ward performing "Mirror", "A New Thing", and other songs.

== Discography ==
=== Albums ===
- A New Thing (2023, Zelda House Records)
- Purified Love (2024, Zelda House Records)

=== Selected singles ===
- "Mirror" (2018)
- "Anchor" (2020)
- "Love & Adoration" (2021)
- "Familiar" (2022)
