= Elgin High School (Oklahoma) =

School in Elgin, Oklahoma, United States

Coordinates: 34°46′56″N 98°17′17″W

Location
- Highway 17 & Mighty Owl Avenue; Elgin, Comanche County, Oklahoma 73538; United States

Information
- Type: Co-educational, public, secondary
- Established: 1902
- School district: Elgin Public School District
- Authority: Oklahoma State Department of Education
- Superintendent: Nate Meraz
- Principal: Curtis Lorah
- Staff: 41.57 (FTE)
- Faculty: 49
- Grades: 9-12
- Enrollment: 791 (2023-2024)
- Student to teacher ratio: 19.03
- Colors: Cardinal red White; Black
- Athletics conference: 5A District 1
- Sports: Baseball, boys' basketball, girls' basketball, cheerleading, cross country, football, golf, soccer, softball, track & field, volleyball, wrestling, tennis, powerlifting, and swimming
- Mascot: Owl
- Rivals: Cache Bulldogs
- Yearbook: The Owl
- Website: Elgin High School

Elgin High School is a secondary school located in Comanche County in Elgin, Oklahoma, United States. It is a part of Elgin Public Schools.

The district, which has one comprehensive high school, includes Elgin, Lakeside Village, Lawtonka Acres, and portions of Edgewater Park and Medicine Park.

== Demographics ==
With Elgin's proximity to Ft. Sill Army Base, a significant number of military children are present in the schools, making up 31.8% of the student population. About 60% of students are White, 18.1% are Hispanic, 7.4% are American Indian, 2.3% are African American, and 2.3% are American Asian.

== Academics ==
Honor and AP courses are offered for English, Mathematics, Science, and History. Elgin High has special education programs, alternative education programs, and Title 1.

Other courses include Foreign Language (Spanish & Comanche), Computer Technology, Personal Financial Lit, Art, Pottery, Drama, Stagecraft, Vocal Music, Band, Jazz Band, Creative Writing, Robotics, Intro to Agriscience, Agricultural Communications, Plant and Soil Science, Horticulture, Agricultural Leadership and Personal Development, Geography, World Cultures, Psychology, Chemistry, Zoology, Forensics, and Anatomy/Physiology.

Students in 11th and 12th grade are eligible to attend Great Plains Technology Center and attend Cameron University for college credit.

== Athletics ==
- 1969 baseball state championship.
- In 2001, Elgin High School set an Oklahoma 4A boys' track state meet record for the 800 meter run competition.
- In, 2011, Elgin won the boys' 4/A cross country state championship.
- In, 2012, the Elgin girls' volleyball team won the school its first State Championship.
- In 2014–2018, Elgin had over 13 state qualifiers in OFBCA (Oklahoma Football Coaches Association) Powerlifting in 4A, and four state placers. In 2016–17 there were a total of 10 qualifiers, and in 2018 only one qualified to state.
- Elgin had its first 3x state champion on their wrestling team in the 126–132 weight class in the years 2016–2018.
- Elgin 5A track and field team has produced state qualifiers and champions in the last 10 years
- In, 2018, Elgin High School won the 4/A baseball state championship.

== School bond approval ==
In March 2017, Elgin residents voted to approve a school bond of $36,910,000 to enhance Elgin Public Schools. The allotted funds were used to add high school classrooms, create a performing arts center, remodel the sports stadium, renovate and expand the agriculture building, and make many other additions. This bond passed with 61% of voters in favor; it needed 60% to pass. The approval added a 2.99% tax increase for residents.
