= Eisenhower High School (Lawton, Oklahoma) =

Coordinates: 34.608898°N 98.457266°W

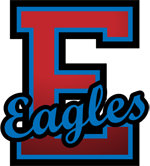

Location
- 5202 West Gore Boulevard; Lawton, Comanche County, Oklahoma 73505; United States

Information
- Type: Co-Educational; public; secondary
- Established: 1962
- School district: Lawton Public Schools
- Authority: Oklahoma State Department of Education
- Principal: Kallan Glasgow
- Staff: 85.72 (on an FTE basis)
- Grades: 9-12
- Enrollment: 1,466 (2024–2025)
- Student to teacher ratio: 17.10
- Colors: Columbia Blue; Red; White
- Athletics conference: 6A District 1
- Sports: Baseball; Basketball; Bowling; Cheer; Cross Country; Football; Golf; Pom; Soccer; Swimming; Tennis; Track; Volleyball; Wrestling
- Nickname: Bald eagles
- Rivals: Lawton High School; MacArthur High School
- Newspaper: The Patriot
- Yearbook: The Talon
- Website: Eisenhower High School

Eisenhower Senior High School (EHS) is one of three public high schools and is located in west Lawton, Oklahoma. It was the second high school built in Lawton, Oklahoma in the early 1960s.

Its attendance boundary includes residents of the Bishop Public School school district.

It is situated on a campus which contains Eisenhower Elementary, Eisenhower Middle School, 400 meter field and track zone, football and soccer fields, tennis courts, large parking areas, and other open areas.

== History ==
Eisenhower High School is named after Dwight David "Ike" Eisenhower, who was the 34th President of the United States and supreme military commander of Allied forces in the European Theater during World War II.

Eisenhower High School opened in September 1962 housing 700 students in a building containing 48 rooms. In May 1964, an auditorium was completed; and in 1965, the northwest wing was completed, providing the school with an additional 45 rooms and housing a total of 1,900 students. In the 2003–2004 school year, EHS had 1,380 students and 112 faculty. Its library contains approximately 16,000 volumes, not including textbooks.

In 2006, construction began on a new wing that housed thirty classrooms, and in 2007, the courtyard was closed and a new cafeteria was built. The staff as of today locks all doors to the courtyard unless lunch is in session. As of the 2007–2008 school year, Eisenhower (commonly referred to by both its own students and the students of rival schools as IKE) has a student body of approximately 1400 students, a number that has increased greatly from the usual average of 1,100 due to freshmen being incorporated into the student body.

== Academics ==
Eisenhower is also well known for academics. Eisenhower has represented the state of Oklahoma for ten years in the Academic Decathlon Nationals competition, having won the state competition for an entire decade. Students at Eisenhower go on to attend many of the most famous universities in the country, while many stay local to attend Cameron University in Lawton. Ike students also attend the University of Oklahoma in Norman, Oklahoma State University in Stillwater, University of Central Oklahoma in Edmond, Southwestern Oklahoma State University in Weatherford, Southeastern Oklahoma State University in Durant or join the military, or the Lawton Public Schools itself.

== Athletics ==
Eisenhower High School is well known for its excellence in sports. Most notably, the Eagles were 5A State and National Champions in football in 1990 as well as several other teams over the last 25 years. Many IKE athletes move on to play with many Big 12 Conference teams, such as Oklahoma State University, University of Oklahoma, University of Texas, and other smaller nationwide colleges and within the state of Oklahoma.

In 2007, Eisenhower Eagles men's basketball team were 6A State Finalist with a record of 24-3 under Head Coach Bruce Harrington and Assistant Coaches Brad Cooksey and Michael Parks. Additionally within 2007, the Eisenhower Eagles Varsity men's bowling team progressed all the way to the state finals, where they won and were crowned the 2007 Oklahoma High School Varsity Boys Bowling Team. Additionally, the men's bowling team also were crowned state champions in 2016. The Women's bowling team has been on a dynasty run winning the state title the past 6 years.

Cheerleading has also been a major sport with their recent win of 6th in the 5A state competition in Tulsa, Oklahoma under Allison Wyatt and Cheryl Zimmerman.

Championship Titles

- Oklahoma 5A
  - Boys basketball 2015
  - Cheerleading: 2002
  - Cheerleading COED: 2000
  - Girls Basketball: 1984, 1985
  - Girls Cross Country: 1991
  - Girls Golf: 2000
  - Girls Tennis: 1991 (Doubles)
  - Football: 1990
  - Boys Track: 1985, 1990, 1991, 1993
    - 300 Hurdles State Meet Record: 1993
- Oklahoma 4A
  - Boys Track: 1978, 1980
- Oklahoma 2A
  - Boys Cross Country: 1965
  - Boys Track: 1968
- Oklahoma A
  - Boys Cross Country: 1964
    - NATIONAL CHAMPIONSHIP ***
  - Football: 1990

== Clubs and Organizations ==
Eisenhower High School sponsors the following clubs and organizations for the student body: Anime, African American, Art, Band, BBB (Blue Body Brigade), BIB (Babes in Blue), Choir, Decathlon, Drama, FCA (Fellowship of Christian Athletes), FCCLA (Family, Career and Community Leaders of America), Fencing, FFA (Future Farmers of America), Geography, National Honor Society, Key Club, Media, Military Child, The Patriot Newspaper, Native American, Orchestra, JROTC (Junior Reserve Officers' Training Corps), Spanish, Step Team, Student Council, Website Staff, The Talon Yearbook Staff.

== Notable alumni ==
- Ray Austin-Former NFL play
- Larry Birdine - NFL player
- Martin Chase - Former NFL player
- Nick Cole - NFL player
- Steven Drozd - Member of the rock band, The Flaming Lips. (Class of 1987)
- Vickie Gates, IFBB professional bodybuilder (Class of 1980)
- Marcus Henry - NFL player
- Koyie Hill - MLB player
- Butch Huskey - MLB player
- Jason Rouser - Olympic gold medalist, track and field
- John Montgomery, politician
- Bella Shaw Class of 1972. CNN Anchor, actress.
- Edward Weisenburger - Class of 1979. Archbishop of the Roman Catholic Archdiocese of Detroit, Michigan.
