= Oklahoma State Highway 65 =

Highway in Oklahoma

State Highway 65

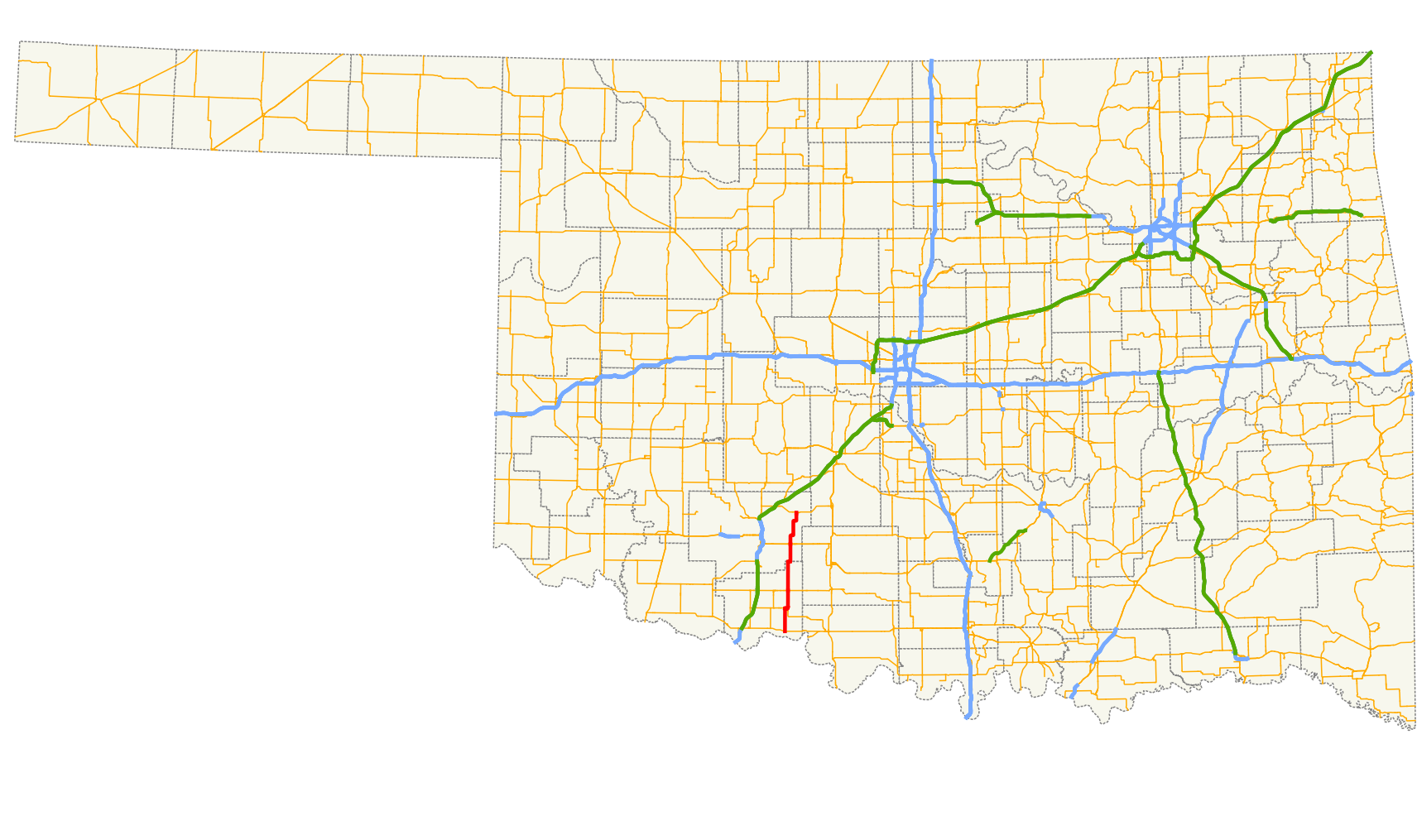

Route information
- Maintained by ODOT
- Length: 44.4 mi (71.5 km)
- Existed: 1932–present

Major junctions
- South end: US 70 east of Randlett
- North end: SH-17 in Sterling

Location
- Country: United States
- State: Oklahoma

Highway system
- Oklahoma State Highway System; Interstate; US; State; Turnpikes
← US 64	→ US 66

State Highway 65, usually known as SH-65 or OK-65 (or simply Highway 65) is a north–south highway in Oklahoma. SH-65 travels 44.4 miles (71 km) from US-70 east of Randlett to State Highway 17 in Sterling. It has no lettered routes.

== Route description ==
State Highway 65 begins at US-70 12 miles (19 km) east of Randlett in Cotton County. From there, it heads north towards Temple. On the western outskirts of that town, SH-65 meets SH-5, and begins a short concurrency with it. The two highways head east through town on Oregon Street before reaching Commercial Avenue, where SH-5 splits off to the south and SH-65 turns north. SH-65 continues north on Commercial for three blocks, then makes a right turn to head east on Boundary Street. As the highway leaves town, it curves back to a due north course.

SH-65 continues northward, meeting SH-53. SH-65 enters Comanche County just south of Hulen, where it turns east to briefly parallel the county line before turning back to the north. The highway passes through Letita before it crosses SH-7 in unincorporated Pumpkin Center. The route then continues north for 13 miles (21 km) before ending at SH-17 in Sterling.

== History ==
State Highway 65 was commissioned between June 1932 and August 1933, first appearing on the August 1933 Department of Highways map. Originally, SH-65 began at the Red River as a continuation of TX-148 and extended north to Walters, using the present-day routes of SH-5B, a small section of SH-5A, and SH-5. By October 1935, the highway had been extended to cover most of its present-day route; SH-65 still used what is now SH-5B, but turned east at the present-day northern terminus of that route to concur with SH-5 into Temple, north of which it used its current route to Sterling. In Sterling, SH-65 turned west, terminating at US-277 in Elgin. At this point, the highway was completely unpaved, with only the segment concurrent with SH-5 and the Elgin–Sterling route graveled. Dirt roads comprised the remainder of the route.

Nearly all of State Highway 65 was decommissioned at some point between April 1937 and April 1938. Only the portion between the Texas line and US-70 was kept. The non-concurrent sections of the former SH-65 routing north of US-70 were dropped from the state highway system, excepting the portion from Elgin to Sterling, which became a western extension of SH-17. In 1940, this change was mostly undone—all of the highway between Temple and Sterling was restored as SH-65. However, this left the section of highway connecting US-70 to TX-148 discontiguous from the remainder of the highway. At this point in time, the southern section of highway and the portion of the route between Temple and SH-53 had been graveled.

In 1941, the southern section of SH-65 was abandoned, only to be restored the following year, and then was dropped again by June 1944. A section of dirt road between US-70 and Temple had been also added to SH-65 by June 1944, setting the highway at its present-day termini.

By 1956, the only remaining gravel section of Highway 65 was the portion between SH-53 and the Comanche County line. The route was completely paved by 1966.

== Junction list ==
County	Location	mi	km	Destinations	Notes
Cotton		0.0	0.0	US 70	Southern terminus
Cotton	Temple	8.0	12.9	SH-5	
Cotton	Temple	8.5	13.7	SH-5	
Cotton		15.0	24.1	SH-53	
Comanche	Pumpkin Center	31.8	51.2	SH-7	
Comanche	Sterling	44.4	71.5	SH-17	Northern terminus
1.000 mi = 1.609 km; 1.000 km = 0.621 mi: Concurrency terminus
