= Bethel, Comanche County, Oklahoma =

Unincorporated community in Oklahoma, US

Bethel, Oklahoma
- Unincorporated Community
- Location within Oklahoma
- Coordinates: 34°35′39″N 98°09′33″W
- Country: United States
- State: Oklahoma
- County: Comanche
- Elevation: 1,129 ft (344 m)
- Time zone: UTC-6 (Central (CST))
  - Summer (DST): UTC-5 (CDT)
- ZIP codes: 73501
- Area code: 580
- GNIS feature ID: 1100208

Bethel is an unincorporated community along State Highway 7 in Comanche County, Oklahoma, United States, located east of Lawton.
