= Edgewater Park, Oklahoma =

Unincorporated community in Oklahoma, US

- Census-designated place
- Location within Oklahoma Location within the United States
- Coordinates: 34°49′29″N 98°22′30″W
- Country: United States
- State: Oklahoma
- County: Comanche

Area
  - Total: 0.32 sq mi (0.82 km^{2})
  - Land: 0.32 sq mi (0.82 km^{2})
  - Water: 0 sq mi (0.00 km^{2})
- Elevation: 1,266 ft (386 m)

Population (2020)
  - Total: 262
  - Density: 823/sq mi (317.8/km^{2})
- Time zone: UTC-6 (Central (CST))
  - Summer (DST): UTC-5 (CDT)
- ZIP Code: 73006 (Apache)
- Area code: 580
- FIPS code: 40-23100
- GNIS feature ID: 2812847

Edgewater Park is a census-designated place (CDP) in Comanche County, Oklahoma, United States. It was first listed as a CDP prior to the 2020 census. As of the 2020 census, Edgewater Park had a population of 262.

The CDP is in northern Comanche County, on high ground overlooking Lake Ellsworth from the west. It is less than 1 mile (1.6 km) east of U.S. Routes 62/281 at a point 16 miles (26 km) north of Lawton and 5 miles (8 km) south of Apache.

Lake Ellsworth is an impoundment on East Cache Creek, a south-flowing tributary of the Red River.

== Demographics ==
Historical population
Census	Pop.	Note	%±
2020	262		—
U.S. Decennial Census

=== 2020 census ===
As of the 2020 census, Edgewater Park had a population of 262. The median age was 42.1 years. 20.6% of residents were under the age of 18 and 15.6% of residents were 65 years of age or older. For every 100 females there were 113.0 males, and for every 100 females age 18 and over there were 123.7 males age 18 and over.

0.0% of residents lived in urban areas, while 100.0% lived in rural areas.

There were 114 households in Edgewater Park, of which 27.2% had children under the age of 18 living in them. Of all households, 44.7% were married-couple households, 22.8% were households with a male householder and no spouse or partner present, and 24.6% were households with a female householder and no spouse or partner present. About 35.9% of all households were made up of individuals and 20.1% had someone living alone who was 65 years of age or older.

There were 143 housing units, of which 20.3% were vacant. The homeowner vacancy rate was 1.0% and the rental vacancy rate was 32.0%.

=== Racial and ethnic composition ===
Racial composition as of the 2020 census
Race	Number	Percent
White	198	75.6%
Black or African American	0	0.0%
American Indian and Alaska Native	24	9.2%
Asian	0	0.0%
Native Hawaiian and Other Pacific Islander	0	0.0%
Some other race	6	2.3%
Two or more races	34	13.0%
Hispanic or Latino (of any race)	29	11.1%

== Education ==
The school district of the southern portion is Elgin Public Schools, while the northern portion is in Boone-Apache Public Schools. The former district's comprehensive high school is Elgin High School.
