= Cache Public Schools =

School district in Oklahoma

Coordinates: 34.622003°N 98.623583°W

Location
- 102 E H Ave; Cache, Oklahoma 73527 Comanche County

District information
- Type: Public, Primary, Secondary, Co-Educational
- Motto: What starts here changes the world.
- Grades: Primary PreK - 1st Intermediate 2nd - 4th 5th&6th 5th - 6th Middle School 7th - 8th Mid-High School 9th High School 10th - 12th
- Established: 1902
- Superintendent: Chad Hance
- Asst. superintendent(s): Tammie Reynolds
- Schools: 5
- Budget: $26,000,000

Students and staff
- Students: 2,030
- Teachers: 128
- Student–teacher ratio: 16:1
- Athletic conference: 4A District 1

Other information
- Website: Cache Public Schools

Cache Public Schools is a public school district located in Cache, Oklahoma.

It includes a portion of western Lawton.

== List of schools ==
=== Secondary schools ===
- Cache High School
- Cache Mid-High School

=== Middle schools ===
- Cache Middle School

=== Primary schools ===
- Cache Elementary
- Cache Intermediate
