= Sterling, Oklahoma =

Town in Oklahoma, US

- Town
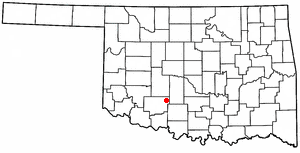
- Location of Sterling, Oklahoma
- Coordinates: 34°44′57″N 98°10′21″W
- Country: United States
- State: Oklahoma
- County: Comanche

Area
  - Total: 0.82 sq mi (2.13 km^{2})
  - Land: 0.82 sq mi (2.13 km^{2})
  - Water: 0 sq mi (0.00 km^{2})
- Elevation: 1,224 ft (373 m)

Population (2020)
  - Total: 668
  - Density: 812.3/sq mi (313.62/km^{2})
- Time zone: UTC-6 (Central (CST))
  - Summer (DST): UTC-5 (CDT)
- ZIP code: 73567
- Area code: 580
- FIPS code: 40-70150
- GNIS feature ID: 2413333

Sterling is a town in Comanche County, Oklahoma, United States. The population was 668 at the time of the 2020 Census. It is part of the Lawton Metropolitan Statistical Area.

== Geography ==
Sterling is at the intersection of State Highway 17 and the northern terminus of State Highway 65.

According to the United States Census Bureau, the town has a total area of 0.8 square miles (2.1 km^{2}), all land.

== Demographics ==
Historical population
Census	Pop.	Note	%±
1910	276		—
1920	265		−4.0%
1930	361		36.2%
1940	430		19.1%
1950	447		4.0%
1960	562		25.7%
1970	675		20.1%
1980	702		4.0%
1990	684		−2.6%
2000	577		−15.6%
2010	793		37.4%
2020	668		−15.8%
U.S. Decennial Census

=== 2020 census ===
As of the 2020 census, Sterling had a population of 668. The median age was 38.8 years. 22.6% of residents were under the age of 18 and 20.7% of residents were 65 years of age or older. For every 100 females there were 87.1 males, and for every 100 females age 18 and over there were 86.0 males age 18 and over.

0.0% of residents lived in urban areas, while 100.0% lived in rural areas.

There were 295 households in Sterling, of which 29.5% had children under the age of 18 living in them. Of all households, 38.3% were married-couple households, 20.7% were households with a male householder and no spouse or partner present, and 35.3% were households with a female householder and no spouse or partner present. About 35.0% of all households were made up of individuals and 15.0% had someone living alone who was 65 years of age or older.

There were 335 housing units, of which 11.9% were vacant. The homeowner vacancy rate was 2.1% and the rental vacancy rate was 12.0%.

Racial composition as of the 2020 census
Race	Number	Percent
White	553	82.8%
Black or African American	2	0.3%
American Indian and Alaska Native	41	6.1%
Asian	0	0.0%
Native Hawaiian and Other Pacific Islander	1	0.1%
Some other race	6	0.9%
Two or more races	65	9.7%
Hispanic or Latino (of any race)	30	4.5%

=== 2010 census ===
As of the census of 2010, there were 793 people, 308 households, and 216 families residing in the town. The population density was 991 inhabitants per square mile (383/km^{2}). There were 341 housing units at an average density of 426 per square mile (164/km^{2}). The racial makeup of the town was 90.2% White, 11.6% Native American, 0.3% Black or African American, 0.0% Pacific Islander, 0.6% from other races, and 4.7% from two or more races. Hispanic or Latino of any race were 4.7% of the population.

There were 308 households, out of which 34.4% had children under the age of 18 living with them, 53.2% were married couples living together, 13.0% had a female householder with no husband present, and 29.9% were non-families. 25.3% of all households were made up of individuals, and 11.4% had someone living alone who was 65 years of age or older. The average household size was 2.57 and the average family size was 3.11.

In the town, the population was spread out, with 29.5% under the age of 18, 8.6% from 18 to 24, 26.1% from 25 to 44, 20.6% from 45 to 64, and 15.2% who were 65 years of age or older. The median age was 31.2 years. For every 100 females, there were 93.9 males. For every 100 females age 18 and over, there were 87.0 males.

=== 2000 census ===
According to the 2000 census, the median income for a household in the town was $26,583, and the median income for a family was $29,563. Males had a median income of $27,841 versus $24,167 for females. The per capita income for the town was $12,707. About 17.7% of families and 20.5% of the population were below the poverty line, including 32.3% of those under age 18 and 13.5% of those age 65 or over.

== Utilities ==
- Sterling's public works authority provides water, sewer, and sanitation services to the town.
- Electric service is provided by American Electric Power Public Service Company of Oklahoma.
- Natural gas service is provided by Oklahoma Natural Gas.
- Telephone, Internet, and Digital TV Services is provided by Hilliary Communications.
- Digital telephone service and high-speed Internet is provided by Wichita Online and Windstream Communications.
