= Geronimo, Oklahoma =

Town in Oklahoma, US

- Town
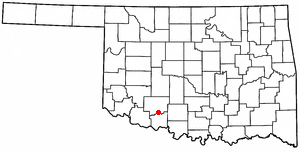
- Location of Geronimo, Oklahoma
- Coordinates: 34°28′53″N 98°23′01″W
- Country: United States
- State: Oklahoma
- County: Comanche

Area
  - Total: 1.49 sq mi (3.86 km^{2})
  - Land: 1.49 sq mi (3.86 km^{2})
  - Water: 0 sq mi (0.00 km^{2})
- Elevation: 1,096 ft (334 m)

Population (2020)
  - Total: 1,158
  - Density: 776.9/sq mi (299.95/km^{2})
- Time zone: UTC-6 (Central (CST))
  - Summer (DST): UTC-5 (CDT)
- ZIP code: 73543
- Area code: 580
- FIPS code: 40-29100
- GNIS feature ID: 2412679
- Website: www.cityofgeronimo.gov

Geronimo is a town in Comanche County, Oklahoma, United States. As of the 2020 census, Geronimo had a population of 1,158. It is included in the Lawton, Oklahoma Metropolitan Statistical Area.

== Geography ==
According to the United States Census Bureau, the town has a total area of 1.5 square miles (3.9 km^{2}), all land.

== Demographics ==
Historical population
Census	Pop.	Note	%±
1910	186		—
1920	161		−13.4%
1930	134		−16.8%
1940	117		−12.7%
1950	103		−12.0%
1960	199		93.2%
1970	587		195.0%
1980	726		23.7%
1990	990		36.4%
2000	959		−3.1%
2010	1,268		32.2%
2020	1,158		−8.7%
U.S. Decennial Census

=== 2020 census ===
As of the 2020 census, Geronimo had a population of 1,158. The median age was 36.0 years. 26.0% of residents were under the age of 18 and 12.5% of residents were 65 years of age or older. For every 100 females there were 108.6 males, and for every 100 females age 18 and over there were 103.1 males age 18 and over.

0.0% of residents lived in urban areas, while 100.0% lived in rural areas.

There were 449 households in Geronimo, of which 37.4% had children under the age of 18 living in them. Of all households, 48.1% were married-couple households, 19.2% were households with a male householder and no spouse or partner present, and 26.5% were households with a female householder and no spouse or partner present. About 27.6% of all households were made up of individuals and 8.5% had someone living alone who was 65 years of age or older.

There were 523 housing units, of which 14.1% were vacant. The homeowner vacancy rate was 2.1% and the rental vacancy rate was 13.4%.

Racial composition as of the 2020 census
Race	Number	Percent
White	753	65.0%
Black or African American	45	3.9%
American Indian and Alaska Native	140	12.1%
Asian	10	0.9%
Native Hawaiian and Other Pacific Islander	2	0.2%
Some other race	44	3.8%
Two or more races	164	14.2%
Hispanic or Latino (of any race)	165	14.2%

=== 2010 census ===
As of the census of 2010, there were 1,268 people, 451 households, and 340 families residing in the town. The population density was 835.7 inhabitants per square mile (322.7/km^{2}). There were 533 housing units at an average density of 350 per square mile (140/km^{2}). The racial makeup of the town was 67.0% White, 3.6% African American, 13.9% Native American, 1.7% Asian, 0.1% Pacific Islander, 4.9% from other races, and 8.8% from two or more races. Hispanic or Latino people of any race were 11.2% of the population.

There were 451 households, out of which 37.7% had children under the age of 18 living with them, 53.9% were married couples living together, 16.6% had a female householder with no husband present, and 24.6% were non-families. 21.7% of all households were made up of individuals, and 6.3% had someone living alone who was 65 years of age or older. The average household size was 2.81 and the average family size was 3.22.

In the town, the population was spread out, with 30.4% under the age of 18, 8.3% from 18 to 24, 30.0% from 25 to 44, 21.4% from 45 to 64, and 10.0% who were 65 years of age or older. The median age was 31.5 years. For every 100 females, there were 90.4 males. For every 100 females age 18 and over, there were 88.3 males.

=== 2000 census ===
According to the 2000 census, the median income for a household in the town was $28,583, and the median income for a family was $30,833. Males had a median income of $29,375 versus $19,063 for females. The per capita income for the town was $11,236. About 13.7% of families and 13.5% of the population were below the poverty line, including 8.4% of those under age 18 and 28.9% of those age 65 or over.

== 1984 bank robbery ==
Geronimo was the scene of one of the deadliest bank robberies in recent Oklahoma history on December 14, 1984. Shortly after 1 p.m., Jay Wesley Neill entered the First Bank of Chattanooga in Geronimo, and forced the three tellers to the back room, where he had them lie face down on the floor and stabbed them to death. The three employees (Kay Bruno, 42; Jerri Bowles, 19; Joyce Mullenix, 25) were stabbed a total of 75 times. Mullenix was six months pregnant.

Three customers entered the bank while Neill was attempting to decapitate one of the tellers. The customers were taken to the back room and shot in the head. Ralph Zeller, 33, died from his wounds, becoming the fourth and final murder victim. Bellen Robels, 15, and her husband Reuben Robels, 20, would recover from their head wounds. Neill attempted to shoot the couple's 14-month-old daughter, Marie, but the gun was out of bullets.

Neill and accomplice Robert Grady Johnson were arrested on December 17 at the Holiday Inn in downtown San Francisco. Marked bills were used to pay for hotel rooms, limousine rides and shopping excursions. $3,700 were left on Neill and in the hotel room. Upon their extradition back to Comanche County, OK, then-District Attorney Dick Tannery prosecuted both defendants for capital murder and sought death sentences.

In 1985, Neill and Johnson were both convicted by a Comanche County jury in Lawton of the crimes related to the robbery and murders and assessed the death penalty. Technicalities in the original trial later resulted in both defendants being retried separately with both again convicted. Those convictions affirmed Neill's death sentence and Johnson's death sentence was changed to four life prison sentences with the possibility of parole. Neill was executed by lethal injection at the Oklahoma State Penitentiary in McAlester in November 2002.

Jay Wesley Neill was the 54th person executed by the state of Oklahoma since resuming executions in 1990.
