= Buffalo Lodge =

- U.S. National Register of Historic Places
- Location within Oklahoma
- Nearest city: Cache, Oklahoma
- Coordinates: 34°44′00″N 98°42′38″W
- Area: 1 acre (0.40 ha)
- Built: 1913
- Built by: Frank Rush, Sr.
- NRHP reference No.: 81000457
- Added to NRHP: May 11, 1981

The Buffalo Lodge, in the Wichita Mountains Wildlife Refuge near Cache, Oklahoma, was built in 1913. It was listed on the National Register of Historic Places in 1981.

It is a 42 by 26 feet (12.8 m × 7.9 m) building, with screened porches. It is one of the oldest structures in the refuge, and is located in the residential area of the Refuge Headquarters. It was built by the United States Forest Service, by Frank Rush, and served as the office building for the reserve/preserve. It was later used as a residence by the Rush family.
