= Lawton metropolitan area, Oklahoma =

Lawton metropolitan area
- Metropolitan Statistical Area
- Lawton Metropolitan Statistical Area
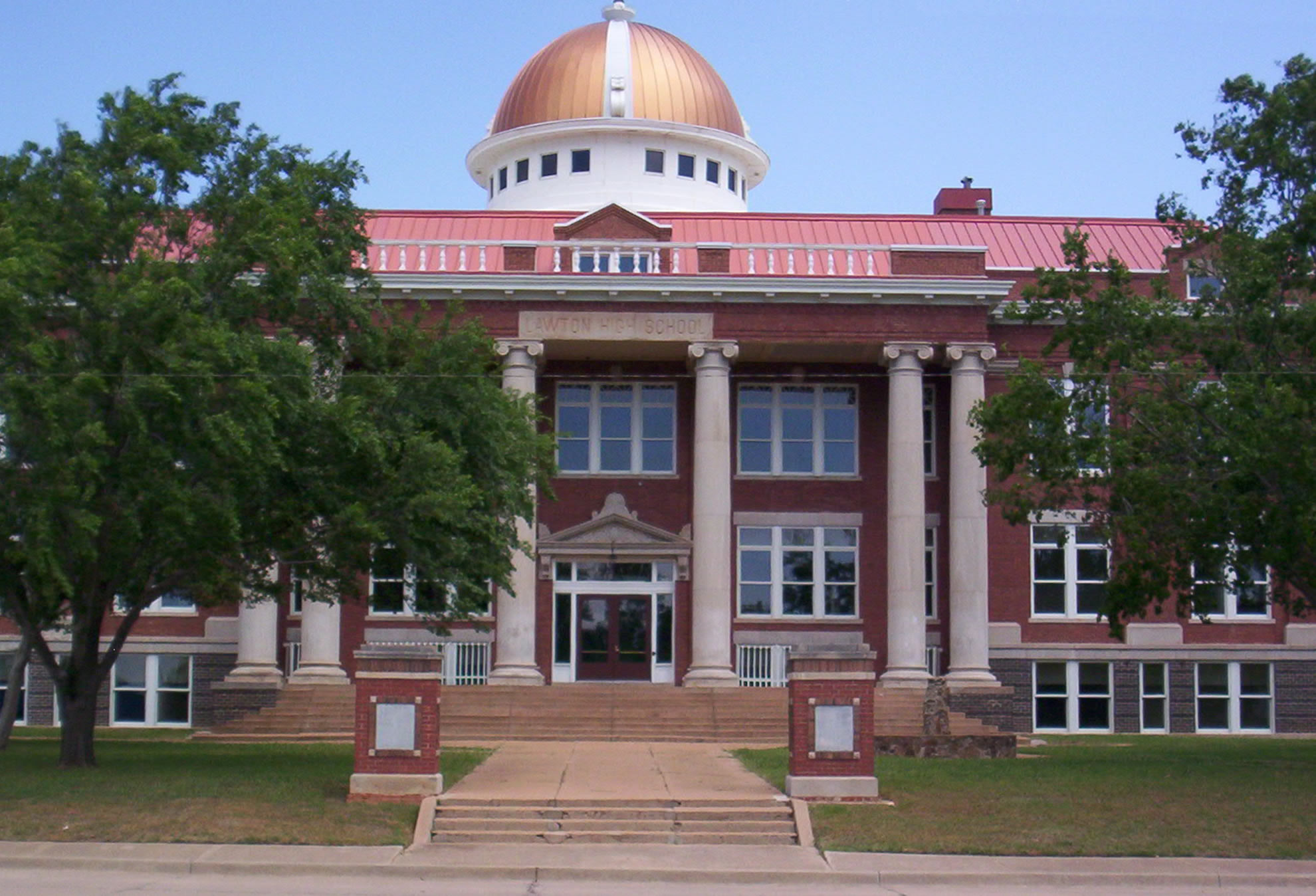
- Lawton City Hall (Formerly Central Lawton Jr High School)
Interactive Map of Lawton–Duncan, OK CSA
City of Lawton
Fort Sill
Lawton, OK MSA
Duncan, OK μSA
34°39′45″N 98°28′35″W
- Country: United States
- State: Oklahoma
- Largest city: Lawton
- Other cities: Cache; Elgin; Duncan

Area
  - Total: 1,069.3 sq mi (2,769 km^{2})
- Highest elevation: 2,474 ft (754 m)
- Lowest elevation: 997 ft (304 m)

Population
  - Total: 130,291 (2,010 Census)
  - Rank: 324th in the U.S.
  - Density: 116/sq mi (44.8/km^{2})
- Time zone: UTC-6 (CST)
  - Summer (DST): UTC-5 (CDT)

The Lawton Metropolitan Statistical Area, as defined by the United States Census Bureau, is an area consisting of two counties – Comanche and Cotton – in Oklahoma, anchored by the city of Lawton. As of the 2010 census, the MSA had a population of 130,291.

== Counties ==
- Comanche
- Cotton

== Communities ==
=== Cities ===
- Cache
- Elgin
- Lawton (principal city)
- Walters (county seat)

=== Towns ===
- Ahpeatone
- Chattanooga (partial)
- Cookietown
- Devol
- Faxon
- Fivemile
- Fletcher
- Geronimo
- Hooper
- Hulen
- Indiahoma
- Medicine Park
- Randlett
- Sterling
- Taylor
- Temple

== See also ==
- Oklahoma census statistical areas
