= Faxon, Oklahoma =

Town in Oklahoma, US

- Town
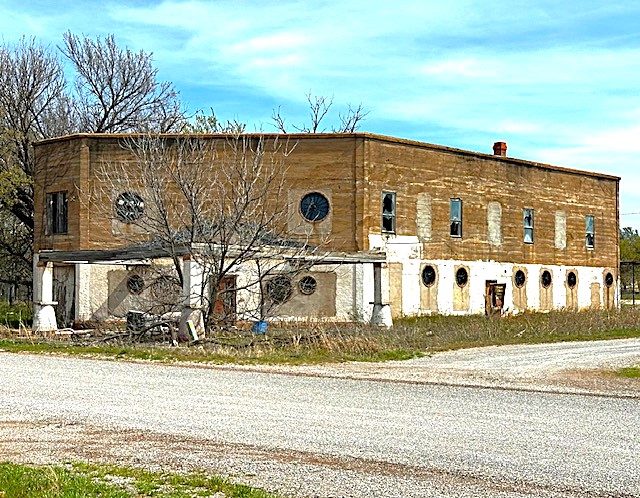
- Abandoned building at Faxon in March 2025

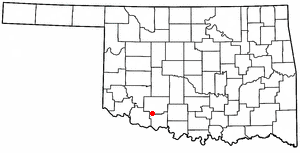
- Location of Faxon, Oklahoma
- Coordinates: 34°27′37″N 98°34′46″W
- Country: United States
- State: Oklahoma
- County: Comanche

Area
  - Total: 0.26 sq mi (0.67 km^{2})
  - Land: 0.26 sq mi (0.67 km^{2})
  - Water: 0 sq mi (0.00 km^{2})
- Elevation: 1,083 ft (330 m)

Population (2020)
  - Total: 114
  - Density: 443.7/sq mi (171.32/km^{2})
- Time zone: UTC-6 (Central (CST))
  - Summer (DST): UTC-5 (CDT)
- ZIP code: 73540
- Area code: 580
- FIPS code: 40-25650
- GNIS feature ID: 2412623

Faxon is a town in Comanche County, Oklahoma, United States. It is located on Oklahoma State Highway 36 about 18.3 driving miles southwest of Lawton. The population was 114 at the 2020 census. It is included in the Lawton, Oklahoma Metropolitan Statistical Area.

== Geography ==
According to the United States Census Bureau, the town has a total area of 0.3 square miles (0.78 km^{2}), all land.

=== Climate ===
Climate data for Faxon, Oklahoma
Month	Jan	Feb	Mar	Apr	May	Jun	Jul	Aug	Sep	Oct	Nov	Dec	Year
Mean daily maximum °F (°C)	51.8 (11.0)	57.5 (14.2)	67.3 (19.6)	76.7 (24.8)	84.5 (29.2)	92.7 (33.7)	98.2 (36.8)	97.1 (36.2)	88.3 (31.3)	78.1 (25.6)	64.4 (18.0)	54.1 (12.3)	75.9 (24.4)
Mean daily minimum °F (°C)	25.5 (−3.6)	30.0 (−1.1)	38.6 (3.7)	48.7 (9.3)	57.6 (14.2)	66.1 (18.9)	70.3 (21.3)	69.0 (20.6)	62.3 (16.8)	50.4 (10.2)	38.9 (3.8)	28.8 (−1.8)	48.9 (9.4)
Average precipitation inches (mm)	1.0 (25)	1.4 (36)	2.1 (53)	2.5 (64)	4.5 (110)	3.4 (86)	2.1 (53)	2.7 (69)	3.7 (94)	2.7 (69)	1.5 (38)	1.2 (30)	28.8 (730)
Source 1: weather.com
Source 2: Weatherbase.com

== Demographics ==
Historical population
Census	Pop.	Note	%±
1910	215		—
1920	163		−24.2%
1930	212		30.1%
1940	178		−16.0%
1950	135		−24.2%
1960	137		1.5%
1970	121		−11.7%
1980	140		15.7%
1990	127		−9.3%
2000	134		5.5%
2010	136		1.5%
2020	114		−16.2%
U.S. Decennial Census

=== 2020 census ===
As of the 2020 census, Faxon had a population of 114. The median age was 35.8 years. 31.6% of residents were under the age of 18 and 11.4% of residents were 65 years of age or older. For every 100 females there were 128.0 males, and for every 100 females age 18 and over there were 129.4 males age 18 and over.

0.0% of residents lived in urban areas, while 100.0% lived in rural areas.

There were 42 households in Faxon, of which 33.3% had children under the age of 18 living in them. Of all households, 52.4% were married-couple households, 21.4% were households with a male householder and no spouse or partner present, and 23.8% were households with a female householder and no spouse or partner present. About 19.1% of all households were made up of individuals and 7.2% had someone living alone who was 65 years of age or older.

There were 58 housing units, of which 27.6% were vacant. The homeowner vacancy rate was 7.9% and the rental vacancy rate was 9.1%.

Racial composition as of the 2020 census
Race	Number	Percent
White	84	73.7%
Black or African American	1	0.9%
American Indian and Alaska Native	10	8.8%
Asian	1	0.9%
Native Hawaiian and Other Pacific Islander	1	0.9%
Some other race	4	3.5%
Two or more races	13	11.4%
Hispanic or Latino (of any race)	11	9.6%

=== 2010 census ===
As of the census of 2010, there were 136 people, 55 households, and 39 families residing in the town. The population density was 532.4 inhabitants per square mile (205.6/km^{2}). There were 66 housing units at an average density of 258.3 per square mile (99.7/km^{2}). The racial makeup of the town was 89.7% White, 0.7% African American, 4.4% Native American, 0.7% Asian, 0.0% from other races, and 4.4% from two or more races. Hispanic or Latino of any race were 3.7% of the population.

There were 55 households, out of which 34.5% had children under the age of 18 living with them, 50.9% were married couples living together, 14.5% had a female householder with no husband present, and 29.1% were non-families. 29.1% of all households were made up of individuals, and 18.2% had someone living alone who was 65 years of age or older. The average household size was 2.47 and the average family size was 2.82.

In the town, the population was spread out, with 28.7% under the age of 18, 2.9% from 18 to 24, 19.1% from 25 to 44, 31.6% from 45 to 64, and 17.6% who were 65 years of age or older. The median age was 44.5 years. For every 100 females, there were 83.8 males. For every 100 females age 18 and over, there were 73.2 males.

=== 2000 census ===
According to the 2000 census, the median income for a household in the town was $25,000, and the median income for a family was $31,250. Males had a median income of $30,833 versus $21,250 for females. The per capita income for the town was $13,630. There were 15.4% of families and 13.8% of the population living below the poverty line, including 13.2% of under eighteens and 5.9% of those over 64.
