= Indiahoma Public Schools =

School district in Oklahoma, United States

Coordinates: 34.6194°N 98.7542°W

Indiahoma Public Schools, IPS is a school district with elementary, JH, and HS. It is in the state of Oklahoma. It is also in Comanche County. This school has around 200 to 300 students every year.
