= Elgin Public Schools =

School district in Oklahoma

Coordinates: 34.781826°N 98.288729°W

Elgin Public School District

Location
- 721 J Street; Elgin, Oklahoma 73538 Comanche County United States of America

District information
- Type: Public, Primary, Secondary, Co-Educational
- Grades: Elementary K-4; Middle School 5-8; High School 9-12
- Established: 1902
- Superintendent: Nate Maraz
- Schools: 3
- Budget: $11,139,000

Students and staff
- Students: 1,522
- Teachers: 94
- Student–teacher ratio: 16:1
- Athletic conference: 4A District 1
- District mascot: Owl
- Colors: Cardinal Red & white

Other information
- Website: www.elginps.org

Elgin Public Schools is a school district in Elgin, Oklahoma.

It includes; Elgin, Lakeside Village, Lawtonka Acres, and portions of Edgewater Park and Medicine Park.

== History ==
School District No. 16, county of Comanche, Oklahoma Territory, was formed April 3, 1902. In June 1902, a one-story schoolhouse and other out building were constructed. A. T. Kellison was hired as the first teacher at a salary of $40 per month. By 1908, since enrollment of the school had increased to 80 pupils and 110 in 1909, it was obvious that more space was needed. Construction of a new brick building began and it was occupied in the spring of 1910. The school became accredited in 1928. The first school buses began their daily route in 1935, a hot lunch program also started in 1935, and the first cafeteria begun in 1948, in a building remodeled from an army hospital. In 1937 the first edition of the Elgin Chat was distributed.

When the school opened in September 1925, enrollment was 25 pupils in the high school. It had a total of 70 pupils enrolled in all the grades. Enrollment in 1937 had moved up to a total of 238, with 130 in high school and 108 in the grade school.

The Oklahoma Department of Education closed the Medicine Park School District in 1990 and split it between the Elgin and Lawton school districts.

== Schools ==
- Elgin High School
