= Indiahoma, Oklahoma =

Town in Oklahoma, US

- Town
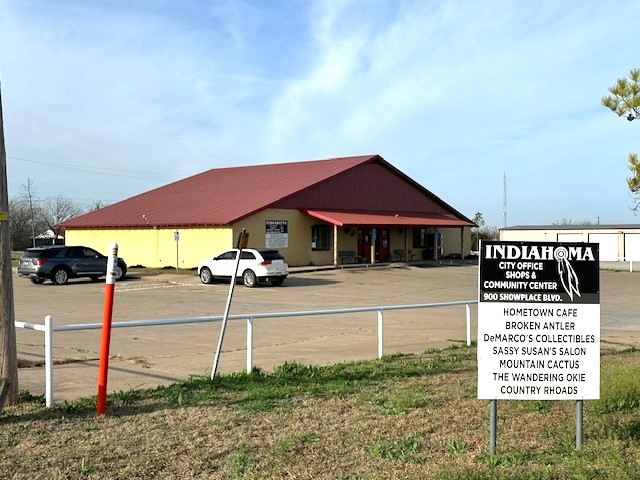
- Indianhoma City Hall

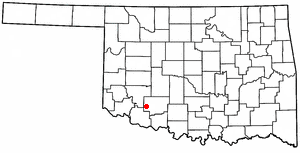
- Location of Indiahoma, Oklahoma
- Coordinates: 34°37′12″N 98°45′07″W
- Country: United States
- State: Oklahoma
- County: Comanche

Area
  - Total: 0.28 sq mi (0.72 km^{2})
  - Land: 0.28 sq mi (0.72 km^{2})
  - Water: 0 sq mi (0.00 km^{2})
- Elevation: 1,345 ft (410 m)

Population (2020)
  - Total: 275
  - Density: 988.0/sq mi (381.46/km^{2})
- Time zone: UTC-6 (Central (CST))
  - Summer (DST): UTC-5 (CDT)
- ZIP code: 73552
- Area code: 580
- FIPS code: 40-36850
- GNIS feature ID: 2412791
- Website: www.indiahomaok.com

Indiahoma is a town in Comanche County, Oklahoma, United States. It is located just south of US Route 62, about 24.4 driving miles west of Lawton.

The population was 275 at the time of the 2020 Census. It is included as an exurb in the Lawton, Oklahoma, Metropolitan Statistical Area. It was also home to the Treasure Lake Job Corp, which closed February 28, 2015.

== Geography ==
According to the United States Census Bureau, the town has a total area of 0.3 square miles (0.78 km^{2}), all land.

== Demographics ==
Historical population
Census	Pop.	Note	%±
1910	188		—
1920	195		3.7%
1930	288		47.7%
1940	337		17.0%
1950	319		−5.3%
1960	378		18.5%
1970	434		14.8%
1980	364		−16.1%
1990	337		−7.4%
2000	374		11.0%
2010	344		−8.0%
2020	275		−20.1%
U.S. Decennial Census

=== 2020 census ===
As of the 2020 census, Indiahoma had a population of 275. The median age was 41.4 years. 23.6% of residents were under the age of 18 and 17.8% of residents were 65 years of age or older. For every 100 females there were 103.7 males, and for every 100 females age 18 and over there were 101.9 males age 18 and over.

0.0% of residents lived in urban areas, while 100.0% lived in rural areas.

There were 114 households in Indiahoma, of which 37.7% had children under the age of 18 living in them. Of all households, 50.0% were married-couple households, 19.3% were households with a male householder and no spouse or partner present, and 28.1% were households with a female householder and no spouse or partner present. About 28.9% of all households were made up of individuals and 14.9% had someone living alone who was 65 years of age or older.

There were 162 housing units, of which 29.6% were vacant. The homeowner vacancy rate was 3.8% and the rental vacancy rate was 35.7%.

Racial composition as of the 2020 census
Race	Number	Percent
White	152	55.3%
Black or African American	1	0.4%
American Indian and Alaska Native	82	29.8%
Asian	1	0.4%
Native Hawaiian and Other Pacific Islander	0	0.0%
Some other race	5	1.8%
Two or more races	34	12.4%
Hispanic or Latino (of any race)	31	11.3%

=== 2010 census ===
At the 2010 census, there were 344 people, 145 households, and 97 families in the town. The population density was 1,226.4 inhabitants per square mile (473.5/km^{2}). There were 170 housing units at an average density of 607.1 per square mile (234.4/km^{2}). The racial makeup of the town was 64.0% White, 27.9% Native American, 0.3% Asian, 1.5% from other races, and 6.4% from two or more races. Hispanic or Latino of any race were 11.9% of the population.

Of the 145 households 22.8% had children under the age of 18 living with them, 42.1% were married couples living together, 16.6% had a female householder with no husband present, and 33.1% were non-families. 27.6% of households were one person and 13.1% were one person aged 65 or older. The average household size was 2.37 and the average family size was 2.82.

The age distribution was 20.3% under the age of 18, 8.7% from 18 to 24, 21.8% from 25 to 44, 35.8% from 45 to 64, and 13.4% 65 or older. The median age was 44.4 years. For every 100 females, there were 98.8 males. For every 100 females age 18 and over, there were 87.7 males.

=== 2000 census ===
According to the 2000 census, the median household income was $21,071, and the median family income was $28,977. Males had a median income of $27,250 versus $19,063 for females. The per capita income for the town was $10,153. About 22.9% of families and 29.6% of the population were below the poverty line, including 33.6% of those under age 18 and 25.5% of those age 65 or over.
