= Beverly Horse =

Native American educator and activist (1931–2010)

- Horse, 1997
- Born: Beverly Sue Johnson; September 24, 1931; Lawton, Oklahoma
- Died: February 10, 2010 (aged 78); Lawton, Oklahoma
- Other names: Beverly J. Horse, Beverly Johnson Horse
- Occupations: Teacher, activist, social worker

Beverly Johnson Horse (born Beverly Sue Johnson; September 24, 1931 – February 10, 2010) was an educator activist for Native American and women's rights. She was an enrolled citizen of the Kiowa Indian Tribe of Oklahoma and was a government administrator for women's programs. The Oklahoma Human Rights Commission recognized her efforts to expand human rights and the Oklahoma Women's Hall of Fame inducted her in 1997.

== Early life and education ==
Beverly Sue Johnson was born on September 24, 1931, at the Lawton Indian Hospital in Lawton, Oklahoma to Alice Maye (née Rowell) and Elihu B. Johnson. Her mother along with the children were enrolled in the Kiowa Indian Tribe of Oklahoma. Johnson attended grade schools in Lawton and Meers, before enrolling at Cache High School. During her schooling she worked on the high school paper and participated in speech competitions, winning awards for both. She graduated along with classmate Chester Horse in 1949. Johnson and Chester married and had three daughters, Sonya Mae, Melanie, and Melissa Horse, before divorcing.

== Career ==
Horse worked for the Lawton School district before resigning in 1973. She then worked for 23 years as the coordinator for the Displaced Homemakers Program at the Great Plains Technology Center in Lawton. The program was designed to assist women who were entering the workforce either for the first time or returning to it after a change in marital status or loss of a primary income source. She counseled women to assist them with technical training or obtaining a General Educational Development, a high school equivalency certification. Horse testified in 1985 before the governor's Advisory Committee on the Status of Women, which was designed to study how to assist women who were trying to find a job but had no recent work experience. A report issued from the study showed single divorcées or widows above the age of 40 and women who were heads of households were vulnerable and needed employment training, transportation, and support services to overcome discrimination against hiring older women or women with children. In addition to her work with the Displaced Homemakers Program, Horse worked with New Direction Home for Abused Children and offered job placement and training services for Native American clients through volunteer organizations.

In addition to her work with women and children, Horse was involved in tribal affairs. She was a participant in several tribal forums to discuss the use of their assets by state authorities, against their rights to tribal sovereignty. Meeting with the Metro Indian Alliance and the Oklahoma Human Rights Commission at the 1990 Urban Indian Forum, she urged that the government should do more to promote Native people in ways that did not focus only on dance, arts, and craftwork. The conference recommended that Indigenous people be appointed to government posts and be involved in economic and educational development planning. They also urged the creation of block grants to assist Natives who lived in urban environments without access to tribal services in acquiring health services, housing, and other social benefits. In 2007, she was elected to serve a two-year term as one of the Kiowa Nation housing authority officials.

In 1996, Horse was recognized for her human rights activism by the Oklahoma Human Rights Commission. The following year she was inducted into the Oklahoma Women's Hall of Fame.

== Death and legacy ==
Horse died on February 10, 2010, at Lawton, and was buried the following day at the Mount Scott Kiowa-Comanche-Apache Cemetery in Meers, Oklahoma.
