= Lawton Public Schools =

School district in Oklahoma

Coordinates: 34.616778°N 98.404599°W

Location
- 753 Fort Sill Boulevard; Lawton, Oklahoma 73502 Comanche County United States of America

District information
- Type: Public, Primary, Secondary, Co-Educational
- Grades: Elementary K-5; Middle School 6-8; High School 9-12
- Established: 1901
- Superintendent: Kevin Hime
- Schools: 33
- Budget: $130,205,000

Students and staff
- Students: 14,100
- Teachers: 1,089
- Student–teacher ratio: 15:1
- Athletic conference: 6A & 5A

Other information
- Website: www.lawtonps.org

Lawton Public Schools is a public school district based in Lawton, Oklahoma, United States.

The district serves most of the city of Lawton, about half of Medicine Park, and surrounding rural areas in central Comanche County. It is also the school district for dependents on Fort Sill. Secondary students living in the dependent districts of Bishop and Flower Mound also attend Lawton Public Schools.

== History ==
The Oklahoma Department of Education closed the Medicine Park School District in 1990 and split it between the Lawton and Elgin school districts.

== Schools ==
Lawton Public Schools operates three high schools, four middle schools, nineteen elementary schools, and two pre-kindergarten centers.

=== High schools ===
- Grades 9-12
  - Eisenhower High School
  - Lawton High School
  - MacArthur High School
  - Life Ready Center

=== Middle schools ===
- Grades 6-8
  - Central Middle School
  - Eisenhower Middle School
  - MacArthur Middle School

=== Elementary schools ===
- Grades K-5
  - Almor West Elementary School
  - Carriage Hills Elementary School
  - Cleveland Elementary
  - Crosby Park Elementary School
  - Edison Elementary School
  - Eisenhower Elementary School
  - Freedom Elementary School
  - Hugh Bish Elementary School
  - John Adams Elementary School
  - Lincoln Elementary School
  - Pat Henry Elementary School
  - Ridgecrest Elementary School
  - Washington Elementary School
  - Whittier Elementary School
  - Woodland Hills Elementary School
- Grades PK-5
  - Carriage Hills Elementary School
  - Pioneer Park Elementary School
  - Sullivan Village Elementary School

=== Pre-Kindergarten Centers ===
- Beginnings Academy
- Learning Tree Academy

== See also ==
- List of school districts in Oklahoma
