= Chattanooga, Oklahoma =

Town in Oklahoma, US

- Town
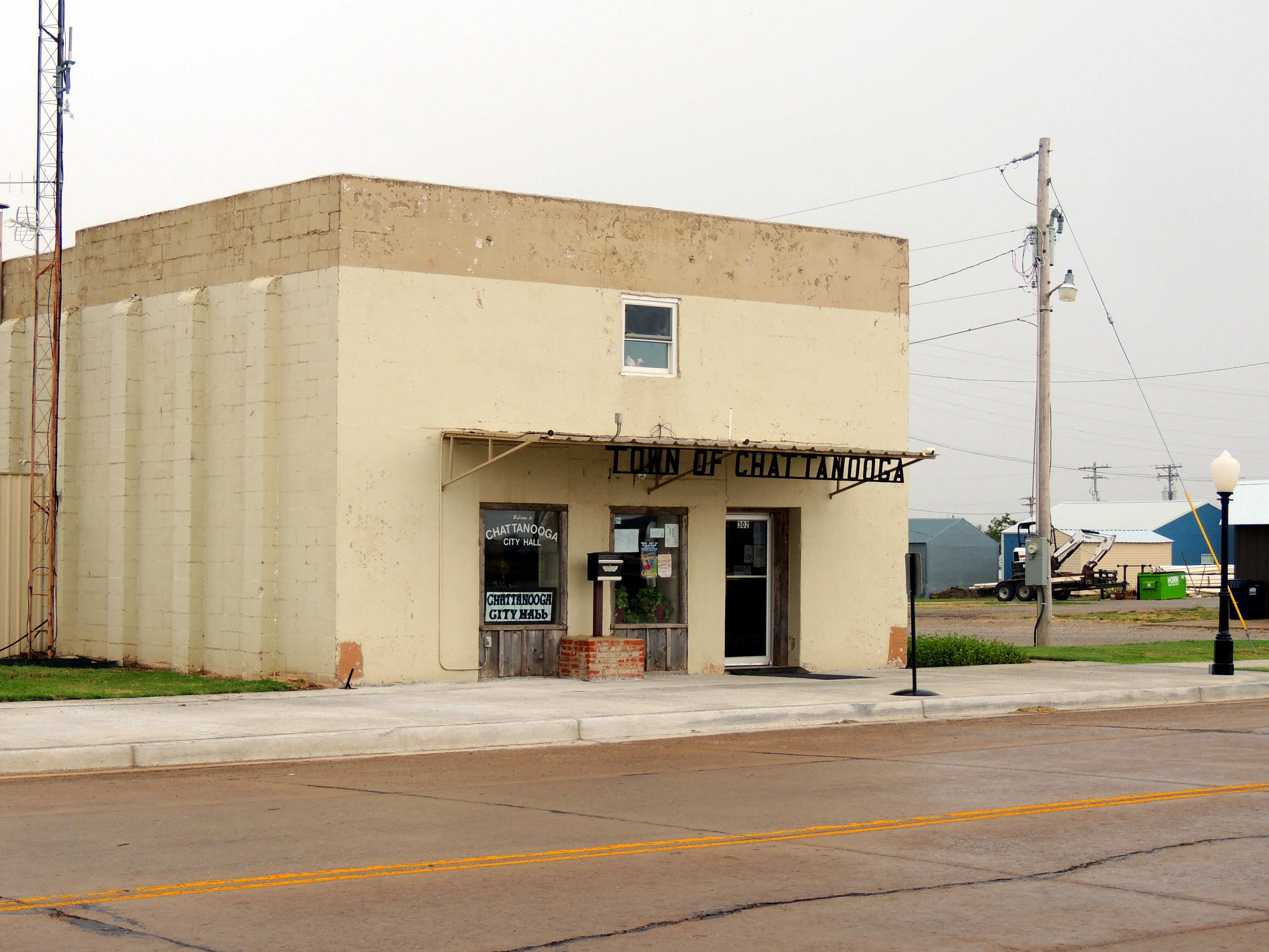
- Chattanooga, Oklahoma City Hall

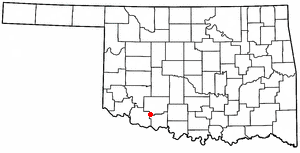
- Location of Chattanooga, Oklahoma
- Coordinates: 34°25′26″N 98°39′14″W
- Country: United States
- State: Oklahoma
- Counties: Comanche, Tillman

Area
  - Total: 0.53 sq mi (1.36 km^{2})
  - Land: 0.53 sq mi (1.36 km^{2})
  - Water: 0 sq mi (0.00 km^{2})
- Elevation: 1,148 ft (350 m)

Population (2020)
  - Total: 400
  - Density: 763.8/sq mi (294.92/km^{2})
- Time zone: UTC-6 (Central (CST))
  - Summer (DST): UTC-5 (CDT)
- ZIP code: 73528
- Area code: 580
- FIPS code: 40-13600
- GNIS feature ID: 2413191

Chattanooga is a town in Comanche and Tillman counties in the U.S. state of Oklahoma. It is located on Oklahoma State Highway 36 about 23.7 driving miles southwest of Lawton. The population was 400 at the 2020 census. The Comanche County portion of Chattanooga is included in the Lawton, Oklahoma Metropolitan Statistical Area.

== History ==
Chattanooga emerged after the opening of the Kiowa-Comanche-Apache Reservation to non-Indian settlement on August 6, 1901. Named by N. C. Sisson after his hometown in Tennessee, the Chattanooga Town Company, comprising Sisson, T. E. Richey, and E. C. Blake, obtained the townsite patent on December 18, 1902. The post office was established in January of the following year.

The Chicago, Rock Island and Pacific Railway played a pivotal role in Chattanooga's early development, extending a branch line from Lawton in 1903. The railway facilitated access to the Big Pasture, opened for settlement in 1906. The branch line was completed to Grandfield in 1920, and was later abandoned in 1942. Chattanooga, with rail access, quickly became an agricultural center, boasting three cotton gins, a lumberyard, a feed yard, and various small businesses by 1912. In 1930, the town had two gins and two elevators.

== Geography ==
According to the United States Census Bureau, the town has a total area of 0.6 square miles (1.5 km^{2}), all land.

=== Climate ===
Climate data for Chattanooga, Oklahoma (1981–2010 normals, extremes 1905–2009)
Month	Jan	Feb	Mar	Apr	May	Jun	Jul	Aug	Sep	Oct	Nov	Dec	Year
Record high °F (°C)	90 (32)	92 (33)	99 (37)	103 (39)	111 (44)	116 (47)	114 (46)	115 (46)	113 (45)	105 (41)	88 (31)	86 (30)	116 (47)
Mean daily maximum °F (°C)	51.7 (10.9)	56.1 (13.4)	64.2 (17.9)	74.1 (23.4)	82.6 (28.1)	91.6 (33.1)	97.0 (36.1)	96.7 (35.9)	87.9 (31.1)	76.5 (24.7)	63.4 (17.4)	52.0 (11.1)	74.5 (23.6)
Daily mean °F (°C)	38.5 (3.6)	42.5 (5.8)	50.4 (10.2)	59.8 (15.4)	69.7 (20.9)	78.8 (26.0)	83.4 (28.6)	83.0 (28.3)	74.5 (23.6)	62.7 (17.1)	50.2 (10.1)	39.4 (4.1)	61.1 (16.2)
Mean daily minimum °F (°C)	25.3 (−3.7)	28.9 (−1.7)	36.7 (2.6)	45.6 (7.6)	56.8 (13.8)	66.0 (18.9)	69.9 (21.1)	69.3 (20.7)	61.1 (16.2)	49.0 (9.4)	36.9 (2.7)	26.9 (−2.8)	47.7 (8.7)
Record low °F (°C)	−17 (−27)	−5 (−21)	4 (−16)	20 (−7)	31 (−1)	44 (7)	50 (10)	47 (8)	34 (1)	16 (−9)	10 (−12)	−13 (−25)	−17 (−27)
Average precipitation inches (mm)	1.18 (30)	1.59 (40)	2.54 (65)	2.74 (70)	4.51 (115)	4.37 (111)	2.07 (53)	2.85 (72)	2.74 (70)	3.26 (83)	1.55 (39)	1.76 (45)	31.16 (791)
Average precipitation days (≥ 0.01 in)	3.3	4.2	4.9	4.6	6.9	6.7	4.6	4.6	4.9	5.1	3.8	3.7	57.3
Source: NOAA

== Demographics ==
Historical population
Census	Pop.	Note	%±
1910	471		—
1920	507		7.6%
1930	362		−28.6%
1940	365		0.8%
1950	333		−8.8%
1960	356		6.9%
1970	302		−15.2%
1980	403		33.4%
1990	437		8.4%
2000	432		−1.1%
2010	461		6.7%
2020	400		−13.2%
U.S. Decennial Census

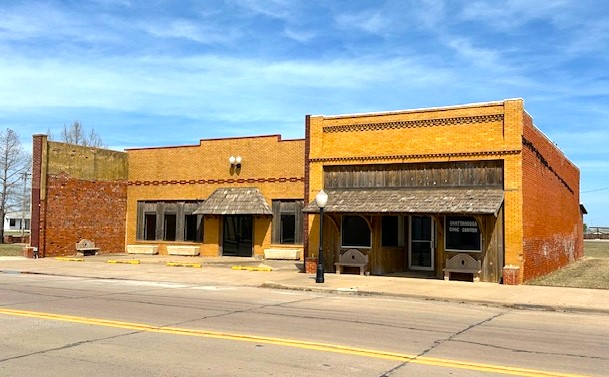
Civic Center at Chattanooga, 3-2025

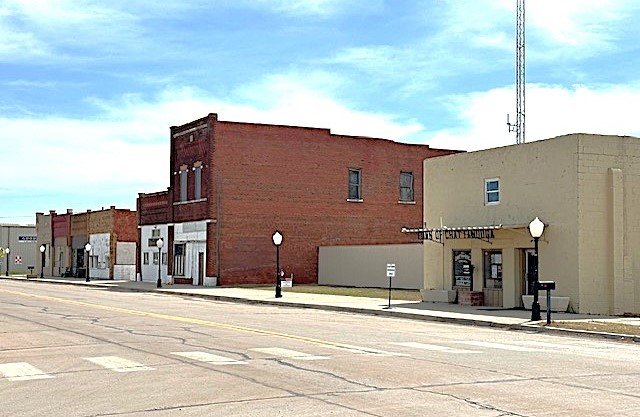
Downtown Chattanooga, 3-2025

=== 2020 census ===
As of the 2020 census, Chattanooga had a population of 400. The median age was 35.5 years. 23.5% of residents were under the age of 18 and 17.3% of residents were 65 years of age or older. For every 100 females there were 88.7 males, and for every 100 females age 18 and over there were 82.1 males age 18 and over.

0.0% of residents lived in urban areas, while 100.0% lived in rural areas.

There were 179 households in Chattanooga, of which 44.1% had children under the age of 18 living in them. Of all households, 45.8% were married-couple households, 14.0% were households with a male householder and no spouse or partner present, and 30.2% were households with a female householder and no spouse or partner present. About 23.5% of all households were made up of individuals and 10.6% had someone living alone who was 65 years of age or older.

There were 194 housing units, of which 7.7% were vacant. The homeowner vacancy rate was 0.0% and the rental vacancy rate was 0.0%.

Racial composition as of the 2020 census
Race	Number	Percent
White	339	84.8%
Black or African American	1	0.2%
American Indian and Alaska Native	11	2.8%
Asian	5	1.2%
Native Hawaiian and Other Pacific Islander	0	0.0%
Some other race	6	1.5%
Two or more races	38	9.5%
Hispanic or Latino (of any race)	20	5.0%

=== 2010 census ===
As of the census of 2010, there were 461 people, 179 households, and 128 families residing in the town. The population density was 882.1 inhabitants per square mile (340.6/km^{2}). There were 206 housing units at an average density of 362.7 per square mile (140.0/km^{2}). The racial makeup of the town was 86.3% White, 0.2% African American, 7.8% Native American, 1.1% from other races, and 3.5% from two or more races. Hispanic or Latino of any race were 5.0% of the population.

There were 179 households, out of which 33.0% had children under the age of 18 living with them, 55.3% were married couples living together, 12.8% had a female householder with no husband present, and 28.5% were non-families. 22.9% of all households were made up of individuals, and 11.2% had someone living alone who was 65 years of age or older. The average household size was 2.58 and the average family size was 3.03.

In the town, the population was spread out, with 26.5% under the age of 18, 7.8% from 18 to 24, 29.2% from 25 to 44, 25.4% from 45 to 64, and 12.6% who were 65 years of age or older. The median age was 38.3 years. For every 100 females, there were 95.3 males. For every 100 females age 18 and over, there were 98.2 males.

=== 2000 census ===
According to the 2000 census, the median income for a household in the town was $26,944, and the median income for a family was $38,750. Males had a median income of $24,545 versus $19,821 for females. The per capita income for the town was $12,989. About 7.1% of families and 13.2% of the population were below the poverty line, including 11.6% of those under age 18 and 12.2% of those age 65 or over.

== Education ==
Chattanooga School District has two schools: Chattanooga Elementary School (preschool–8th grade) and Chattanooga High School (9th–12th grade).
