= Fletcher, Oklahoma =

Town in Oklahoma, US

- Town
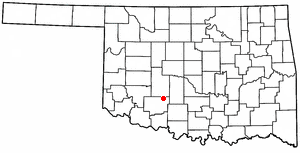
- Location of Fletcher, Oklahoma
- Coordinates: 34°49′21″N 98°14′26″W
- Country: United States
- State: Oklahoma
- County: Comanche

Area
  - Total: 1.93 sq mi (5.01 km^{2})
  - Land: 1.92 sq mi (4.98 km^{2})
  - Water: 0.012 sq mi (0.03 km^{2})
- Elevation: 1,401 ft (427 m)

Population (2020)
  - Total: 1,204
  - Density: 626.0/sq mi (241.69/km^{2})
- Time zone: UTC-6 (Central (CST))
  - Summer (DST): UTC-5 (CDT)
- ZIP code: 73541
- Area code: 580
- FIPS code: 40-26350
- GNIS feature ID: 2412632

Fletcher is a town in Comanche County, Oklahoma, United States. As of the 2020 census, Fletcher had a population of 1,204. It is included in the Lawton, Oklahoma Metropolitan Statistical Area.

== Geography ==
According to the United States Census Bureau, the town has a total area of 0.8 square miles (2.1 km^{2}), all land.

== Utilities ==
Telephone, Internet, and Digital TV Services are provided by Hilliary Communications.

== Demographics ==
Historical population
Census	Pop.	Note	%±
1910	374		—
1920	482		28.9%
1930	739		53.3%
1940	789		6.8%
1950	875		10.9%
1960	884		1.0%
1970	950		7.5%
1980	1,074		13.1%
1990	1,002		−6.7%
2000	1,022		2.0%
2010	1,177		15.2%
2020	1,204		2.3%
U.S. Decennial Census

=== 2020 census ===
As of the 2020 census, Fletcher had a population of 1,204. The median age was 34.9 years. 28.4% of residents were under the age of 18 and 17.7% of residents were 65 years of age or older. For every 100 females there were 88.7 males, and for every 100 females age 18 and over there were 85.0 males age 18 and over.

0.0% of residents lived in urban areas, while 100.0% lived in rural areas.

There were 468 households in Fletcher, of which 37.0% had children under the age of 18 living in them. Of all households, 51.3% were married-couple households, 13.9% were households with a male householder and no spouse or partner present, and 28.2% were households with a female householder and no spouse or partner present. About 24.0% of all households were made up of individuals and 11.5% had someone living alone who was 65 years of age or older.

There were 531 housing units, of which 11.9% were vacant. The homeowner vacancy rate was 2.2% and the rental vacancy rate was 15.9%.

Racial composition as of the 2020 census
Race	Number	Percent
White	954	79.2%
Black or African American	18	1.5%
American Indian and Alaska Native	98	8.1%
Asian	3	0.2%
Native Hawaiian and Other Pacific Islander	1	0.1%
Some other race	14	1.2%
Two or more races	116	9.6%
Hispanic or Latino (of any race)	59	4.9%

=== 2010 census ===
As of the 2010 census, there were 1,177 people, 478 households, and 329 families residing in the town. The population density was 1,430.8 inhabitants per square mile (552.4/km^{2}). There were 544 housing units at an average density of 661.3 per square mile (255.3/km^{2}). The racial makeup of the town was 87.0% White, 1.9% African American, 5.1% Native American, 0.3% Asian, 0.7% from other races, and 4.8% from two or more races. Hispanic or Latino of any race were 4.1% of the population.

There were 478 households, out of which 30.8% had children under the age of 18 living with them, 56.3% were married couples living together, 9.4% had a female householder with no husband present, and 31.2% were non-families. 27.8% of all households were made up of individuals, and 14.6% had someone living alone who was 65 years of age or older. The average household size was 2.46 and the average family size was 2.97.

In the town, the population was spread out, with 25.7% under the age of 18, 7.8% from 18 to 24, 26.3% from 25 to 44, 22.9% from 45 to 64, and 17.2% who were 65 years of age or older. The median age was 37.3 years. For every 100 females, there were 85.4 males. For every 100 females age 18 and over, there were 84.4 males.

=== 2000 census ===
According to the 2000 census, the median income for a household in the town was $27,500, and the median income for a family was $34,028. Males had a median income of $28,594 versus $25,000 for females. The per capita income for the town was $13,329. About 14.0% of families and 14.4% of the population were below the poverty line, including 15.4% of those under age 18 and 15.6% of those age 65 or over.
