= MacArthur High School (Lawton, Oklahoma) =

School in Lawton, Oklahoma, United States

Coordinates: 34°36′32.5″N 98°20′13.05″W

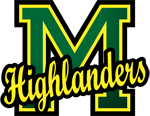

Location
- 4400 East Gore Boulevard; Lawton, Comanche County, Oklahoma 73501; United States

Information
- Type: Co-educational, public, secondary
- Established: 1969
- Locale: Suburban
- School district: Lawton Public Schools
- Authority: Oklahoma State Department of Education
- Principal: Danny Smith
- Teaching staff: 72.50 (FTE)
- Grades: 9–12
- Enrollment: 1,214 (2023–2024)
- Student to teacher ratio: 16.74
- Colors: Black green gold
- Athletics conference: 5A District 1
- Sports: Baseball, basketball, cheer, cross country, football, golf, pom, soccer, swimming, tennis, track, volleyball, wrestling
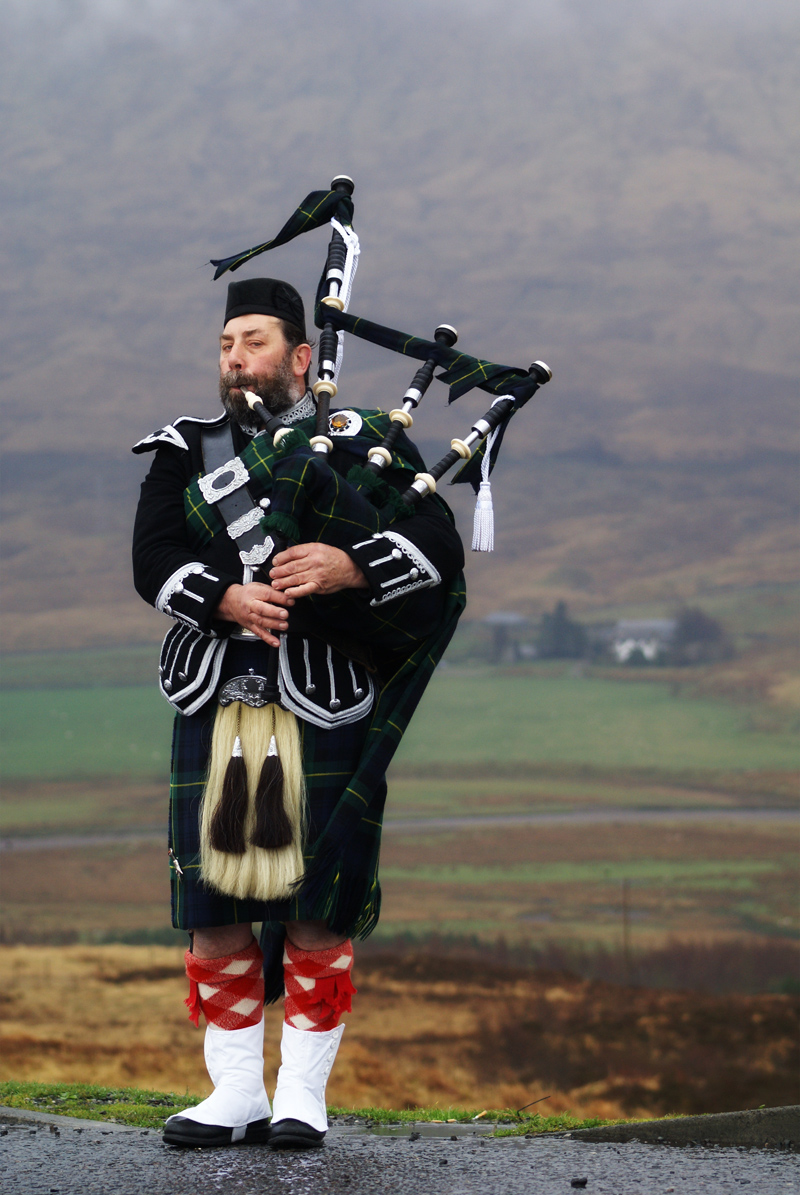
- Mascot: Scottish Highlander
- Newspaper: The Braveheart
- Yearbook: The Highlander
- Website: Official website

MacArthur High School (MHS) was the third high school built in Lawton, Oklahoma, United States. A part of Lawton Public Schools (LPS), MacArthur was built and opened for the east Lawton area in 1969. In the late 1960s and early 1970s, the east Lawton area consisted of four additions or neighborhoods which were under development: Carriage Hills, Park Lane, Sullivan Village, and SunGate.

MacArthur High School was the first high school in the Lawton, Oklahoma area to provide desegregation busing for the residential subdivision of Ranch Oaks during the 1970s. The Ranch Oaks housing addition was located lateral of the Lawton municipal airport on the east side of Southwest 11th Street.

The attendance boundary includes the LPS portion of Medicine Park and the Flower Mound Public School school district.

== Extracurricular activities ==
=== Athletics ===
The following teams have won their respective state championship:

- Baseball: 1985 (4A)
- Fast pitch softball: 2008 (5A), 2009 (5A), 2010 (5A)
- Golf (boys'): 2001 (5A)
- Track & field (boys'): 1982 (3A), 1983 (3A), 1984 (4A)
- Track & field (girls'): 1987 (5A)
- Wrestling: 1990 (4A), 2017 Dual State (5A), 2017 (5A)
- Football: 2014 (5A)

Records

- Girls' 400 meter relay state meet record: 1987 (5A)
- Boys' 400 meter relay state meet record: 1983 (3A)

=== Clubs and organizations ===
MacArthur High School sponsors the following clubs and organizations: Archery, Anime Club, Book Club, Choir/Vocal Music, Crime Stoppers, Dance Team, FCA (Fellowship of Christian Athletes), FFA (Future Farmers of America), Key Club, MacArthur High School Band, JROTC (Junior Reserve Officer's Training Corps), Military Child Club, Multi-Cultural Awareness Club, National Honor Society, Partners Club, Robotics Club, Rocket Club, Science Club, Speech, Theatre and Debate, Student Council, The Braveheart newspaper, and The Highlander yearbook staff.

== Notable alumni ==
- Jammal Brown, former NFL player
- Lauren Nelson, Miss America 2007
- Ken Paxton, attorney general of Texas
