= Comanche County, Oklahoma =

County in Oklahoma, United States

- County
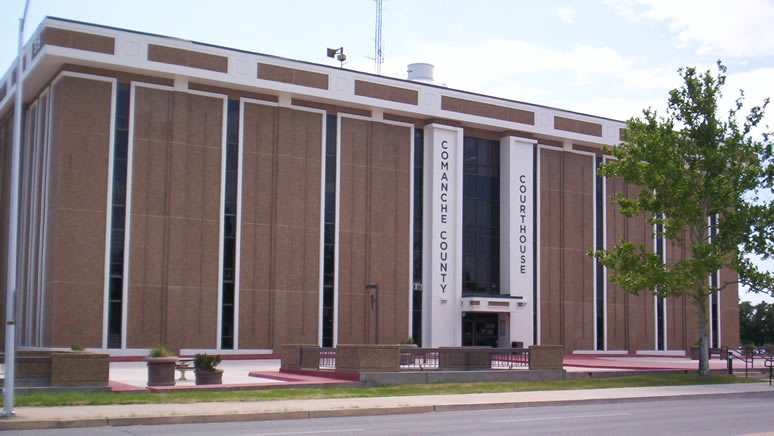
- Comanche County Courthouse

- Seal

- Location within the U.S. state of Oklahoma
- Coordinates: 34°40′N 98°28′W
- Country: United States
- State: Oklahoma
- Founded: July 8, 1901
- Seat: Lawton
- Largest city: Lawton

Area
  - Total: 1,084 sq mi (2,810 km^{2})
  - Land: 1,069 sq mi (2,770 km^{2})
  - Water: 14 sq mi (36 km^{2}) 1.3%

Population (2020)
  - Total: 121,125
  - Estimate (2025): 122,158 ▲
  - Density: 113.3/sq mi (43.75/km^{2})
- Time zone: UTC−6 (Central)
  - Summer (DST): UTC−5 (CDT)
- Congressional district: 4th
- Website: www.comanchecountyok.gov

Comanche County is a county located in the U.S. state of Oklahoma. As of the 2020 census, the population was 121,125, making it the fifth-most populous county in Oklahoma. Its county seat is Lawton. The county was created in 1901 as part of Oklahoma Territory. It was named for the Comanche tribal nation.

Comanche County is included in the Lawton, OK metropolitan statistical area.

Built on former reservation lands of the Comanche, Kiowa, and Apache in Indian Territory, Comanche County was open for settlement on August 16, 1901, by lottery. The region has three cities and seven towns as well as the Fort Sill military installation and Wichita Mountains Wildlife Refuge. The landscape of the county is typical of the Great Plains with flat topography and gently rolling hills, while the areas in the north are marked by the Wichita Mountains. Interstate 44 and three major US Highways serve the county by automobile, the Lawton-Fort Sill Regional Airport serves the county by air, and Greyhound Lines and Lawton Area Transit System serve the county by bus.

Comanche County's economy is largely based in the government sector which consist of half of the county's gross domestic product. The governance of the county is led by a three commission board, which are elected in four year staggered terms. The county is served by several school districts and Cameron University in education as well as three hospitals for health care.

== History ==
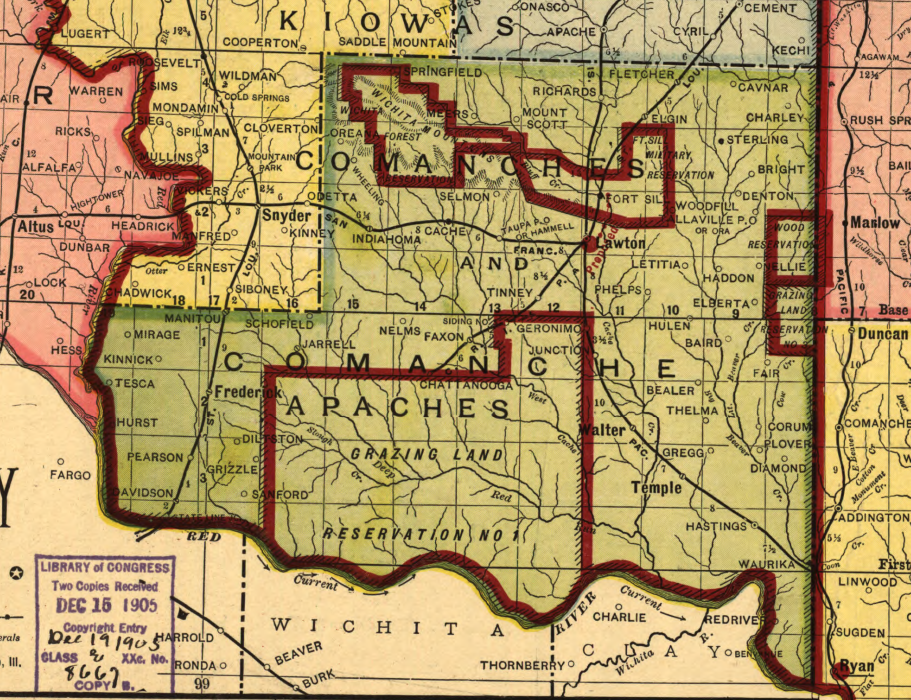
Map of Comanche County in 1905

The land that is present day Oklahoma was first settled by prehistoric American Indians including the Clovis 11500 BCE, Folsom 10600 BCE and Plainview 10000 BCE cultures. Western explorers came to the region in the 16th century with Spanish explorer Francisco Vásquez de Coronado visiting in 1541. Most of the region during this time was settled by the Wichita and Caddo people. Around the 1700s, two tribes from the North, the Comanches and Kiowas, migrated to the Oklahoma and Texas region.

For most of the 18th century, the Oklahoma region was under French control as Louisiana. In 1803, the Louisiana Purchase by Thomas Jefferson brought the area under United States control. In 1830, Congress passed the Indian Removal Act, which removed American Indian tribes and relocated them to Indian Territory. The southern part of the territory was originally assigned to the Choctaw and Chickasaw until 1867 when the Medicine Lodge Treaty allotted the southwest portion of the Choctaw and Chickasaw's lands to the Comanche, Kiowa, and Apache tribes.

Fort Sill was established in 1869 by Major General Philip Sheridan who was leading a campaign in Indian Territory to stop raids into Texas by American Indian tribes. In 1874, the Red River War broke out in the region when the Comanche, Kiowa and Southern Cheyenne left their Indian Territory reservation. Attrition and skirmishes by the US Army finally forced the return of the tribes back to Indian Territory in June 1875.

In 1891, the United States Congress appointed a commission to meet with the tribal leaders and come to an agreement allowing white settlement in the region. Years of controversy and legal maneuvering ensued before President William McKinley issued a proclamation on July 4, 1901, that gave the federal government control over 2,000,000 acres (8,100 km^{2}) of surplus Indian land.

Three 320-acre (1.3 km^{2}) sites in Kiowa, Caddo and Comanche Counties were selected for county seats with Lawton designated as the Comanche County seat. Non-Indian settlement was opened through an auction of lots beginning on August 6, 1901. In December 1906, the south regions of the county reserved for grazing land reserved for American Indian livestock, Big Pasture, were open for settlement.

In 1910, the western portion of Comanche County and southern part of Kiowa County were used to create the short lived county of Swanson. After a lawsuit brought by Comanche County, Swanson County was dissolved by the Supreme Court on June 27, 1911. In 1912, the southern portion of Comanche County, which at the time extended to the Red River, were used to create the new county of Cotton County.

== Geography ==
Map of Comanche County, showing settlements and major roads

According to the U.S. Census Bureau, the county has a total area of 1,084 square miles (2,810 km^{2}), of which 1,069 square miles (2,770 km^{2}) is land and 14 square miles (36 km^{2}) (1.3%) is water.

Comanche County lies in an area that is typical of the Great Plains with prairie, few trees, and generally flat topography with gently rolling hills. The north region of the county consists of the Wichita Mountains including Mount Scott and Mount Pinchot the area's highest peaks.

The area consists mostly of Permian Post Oak Conglomerate limestone on the northern sections of the county. In the south sections of the county, Permian Garber Sandstone is commonly found with some Hennessey Group shale. Area creeks including East Cache Creek and West Cache Creek contain deposits of Quaternary alluvium. To the northwest, the Wichita Mountains consist primarily of Wichita Granite Group from the Cambrian Period.

There are three cities in Comanche County. The largest, Lawton is located in the center of the county and is the county seat. According to the US census, the population of Lawton was 96,867 in 2010, which is 78 percent of the county's population. Cache is located to the west of Lawton on US Highway 62 and has a population of 2,796. In the northeast, Elgin is located along Interstate 44 and has a population of 2,156. Several towns dot the county including: Fletcher, Sterling in the northeast, Medicine Park in the north central region, Indiahoma in the west, Geronimo in the southeast, and Chattanooga and Faxon in the southern regions of the county. Also located in Comanche County is Fort Sill. The 90,000 acre installation is home to the US Army Field Artillery Training Center and the Air Defense Artillery.

Protected areas in Comanche County include the 59,020 acre Wichita Mountains Wildlife Refuge. Established in 1901 the refuge is one of the 546 wildlife refuges throughout the United States to provide a natural habitat for native grazing animals like the Bison, Elk, and Texas longhorn cattle.

=== Adjacent counties ===
- Kiowa County (northwest)
- Tillman County (southwest)
- Cotton County (south)
- Stephens County (southeast)
- Grady County (northeast)
- Caddo County (north)

=== Climate ===
Comanche County lies in a dry subtropical climate (Köppen climate classification Cfa), with frequent variations in weather daily, except during the constantly hot and dry summer months. Frequent strong winds, usually from the south or south-southeast during the summer, help to lessen the hotter weather. Northerly winds during the winter can occasionally intensify cold periods.

The average mean temperature for the southwest Oklahoma is 61.9 °F (16.6 °C). The summers can be extremely hot with an average 21 days with temperatures 100 °F (37.8 °C) and above. The winter months are typically mild, though there can be periods of extreme cold. The area averages eight days per year that fail to rise above freezing. The region receives about 31.6 inches (800 mm) of precipitation and less than 3 inches (80 mm) of snow annually.

Typically in late April through early June, Comanche County is prone to severe weather which can include tornadoes. Notably in 1957, an F4 tornado and again in 1979 an F3 tornado struck the southern region of Lawton.

== Demographics ==
Historical population
Census	Pop.	Note	%±
1910	41,489		—
1920	26,629		−35.8%
1930	34,317		28.9%
1940	38,988		13.6%
1950	55,165		41.5%
1960	90,803		64.6%
1970	108,144		19.1%
1980	112,456		4.0%
1990	111,486		−0.9%
2000	114,996		3.1%
2010	124,098		7.9%
2020	121,125		−2.4%
2025 (est.)	122,158	▲	0.9%
U.S. Decennial Census; 1790-1960 1900-1990; 1990-2000 2010 2020

=== 2020 census ===
As of the 2020 United States census, the county had a population of 121,125. Of the residents, 23.9% were under the age of 18 and 13.4% were 65 years of age or older; the median age was 33.8 years. For every 100 females there were 106.7 males, and for every 100 females age 18 and over there were 108.0 males.

The racial makeup of the county was 57.2% White, 16.3% Black or African American, 6.0% American Indian and Alaska Native, 2.6% Asian, 4.3% from some other race, and 12.8% from two or more races. Hispanic or Latino residents of any race comprised 13.7% of the population.

There were 44,720 households in the county, of which 32.8% had children under the age of 18 living with them and 27.8% had a female householder with no spouse or partner present. About 29.2% of all households were made up of individuals and 10.0% had someone living alone who was 65 years of age or older.

There were 52,603 housing units, of which 15.0% were vacant. Among occupied housing units, 54.3% were owner-occupied and 45.7% were renter-occupied. The homeowner vacancy rate was 2.9% and the rental vacancy rate was 15.4%.

=== 2010 census ===
As of the census of 2010, there were 124,098 people, 44,982 households, and 30,303 families residing in the county. The population density was 116 people per square mile (45 people/km^{2}). There were 50,739 housing units at an average density of 47 units per square mile (18/km^{2}). The racial makeup of the county was 64.5% White, 17.5% Black or African American, 5.9% Native American, 2.2% Asian, 0.6% Pacific Islander, 3.0% from other races, and 6.5% from two or more races; 11.2% of the population were Hispanic or Latino of any race (7.0% Mexican, 2.4% Puerto Rican, 0.3% Spanish, 0.2% Panamanian).

There were 44,982 households, out of which 36.5% had children under the age of 18 living with them, 48.2% were married couples living together, 14.5% had a female householder with no husband present, and 32.6% were non-families. 27.1% of all households were made up of individuals, and 7.8% had someone living alone who was 65 years of age or older. The average household size was 2.53 and the average family size was 3.07.

In the county, the population was spread out, with 25.1% under the age of 18, 13.6% from 18 to 24, 30.1% from 25 to 44, 23.3% from 45 to 64, and 10.2% who were 65 years of age or older. The median age was 31.3 years. For every 100 females there were 106.2 males. For every 100 females age 18 and over, there were 107.3 males.

The median income for a household in the county was $43,817, and the median income for a family was $51,564. Males had a median income of $37,423 versus $31,913 for females. The per capita income for the county was $21,048. About 14.3% of families and 17.6% of the population were below the poverty line, including 29.4% of those under age 18 and 8.1% of those age 65 or over.

== Politics ==
Voter Registration and Party Enrollment as of January 15, 2024
Party	Number of Voters	Percentage
Republican	25,487	42.76%
Democratic	19,191	32.19%
Others	14,932	25.05%
Total	59,610	100%

United States presidential election results for Comanche County, Oklahoma
Year	Republican		Democratic		Third party(ies)	
Year	No.	%	No.	%	No.	%
1908	2,437	38.42%	3,481	54.88%	425	6.70%
1912	1,320	34.06%	1,931	49.82%	625	16.12%
1916	1,221	29.31%	2,130	51.13%	815	19.56%
1920	3,332	49.18%	3,037	44.83%	406	5.99%
1924	3,084	41.41%	3,523	47.30%	841	11.29%
1928	5,069	62.45%	2,956	36.42%	92	1.13%
1932	2,046	21.24%	7,586	78.76%	0	0.00%
1936	3,039	29.97%	7,026	69.29%	75	0.74%
1940	3,703	35.15%	6,796	64.51%	36	0.34%
1944	4,109	35.80%	7,342	63.96%	28	0.24%
1948	2,787	25.94%	7,955	74.06%	0	0.00%
1952	8,756	49.23%	9,029	50.77%	0	0.00%
1956	7,532	46.24%	8,756	53.76%	0	0.00%
1960	10,691	52.79%	9,562	47.21%	0	0.00%
1964	7,936	36.88%	13,585	63.12%	0	0.00%
1968	9,225	39.82%	8,061	34.80%	5,879	25.38%
1972	19,759	79.85%	4,559	18.42%	427	1.73%
1976	13,163	50.04%	12,910	49.08%	230	0.87%
1980	16,609	59.51%	9,972	35.73%	1,329	4.76%
1984	21,382	70.35%	8,890	29.25%	122	0.40%
1988	17,464	60.02%	11,441	39.32%	194	0.67%
1992	15,704	44.21%	12,237	34.45%	7,579	21.34%
1996	14,461	47.76%	12,841	42.41%	2,976	9.83%
2000	17,103	58.31%	11,971	40.81%	259	0.88%
2004	21,170	63.78%	12,022	36.22%	0	0.00%
2008	20,127	58.77%	14,120	41.23%	0	0.00%
2012	17,664	58.52%	12,521	41.48%	0	0.00%
2016	19,183	58.91%	11,463	35.20%	1,918	5.89%
2020	20,905	58.67%	13,747	38.58%	979	2.75%
2024	20,823	60.74%	12,823	37.40%	638	1.86%

== Law and government ==
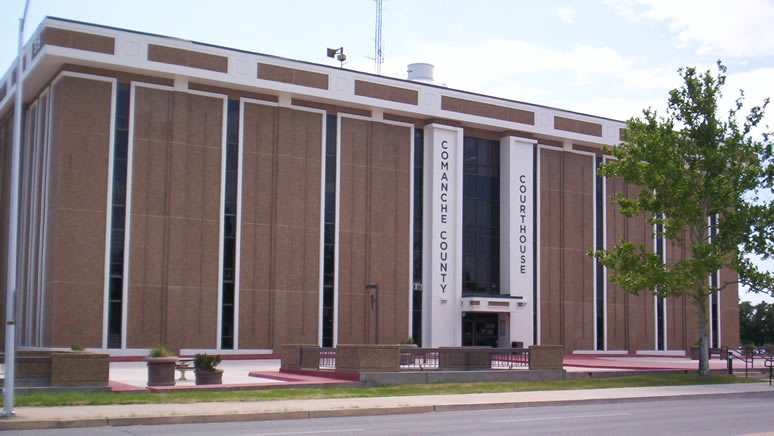
Comanche County Courthouse

Comanche County has a county commission comprising three members elected by district. Commissioners from each district serve four-year staggered terms in partisan elections. Boundaries are set once every 10 years following the federal census. The Board is responsible for inspecting and approving county programs and facilities, supervise the performance county officials, maintaining the county infrastructure, as well as overseeing the financial affairs of the county. In 2011, the commissioners were District 1 Gail Turner, District 2 Ron Kirby, and District 3 Don Hawthorne. In addition to the county commissioners, other elected county officials include: District Attorney, County Sheriff, Treasurer, Assessor, County Clerk, and Court clerk.

At the federal level, Lawton lies in Oklahoma 4th Congressional district, represented by Tom Cole. In the State Senate, the county is represented by District 31 (Don Barrington) and 32 (Dusty Deevers). In the House, District 50 (Dennis Johnson), 62 (T.W. Shannon), 63 (Don Armes), 64 (Ann Coody), 65 (Joe Dorman) covers the county.

== Economy ==
Comanche County's economy is primarily centered on government, manufacturing and retail trade industries. The Lawton MSA has a Gross Domestic Product of $4.89 Billion in 2010 with half (2.66 Billion) in the Government sector. Private industries accounted for 2.23 Billion in GDP in which Manufacturing (451 Million), Real estate and rental and leasing (305 Million), and Retail Trade (255 Million) were the largest fields. In May 2010, it was estimated there were 41,720 people employed. The largest occupation fields included, the Office and Administrative Support Occupations field which had 6,760 employed, the Food Preparation and Serving Related Occupations which employed 4,630, and the Sales and Related Occupations which had 4,150 employed.

== Media ==
The Lawton Constitution is the only daily newspaper published in the county and has a circulation of 30,000. In addition the Fort Sill newspaper, The Cannoneer, is published weekly primarily for military personnel as well as the newspaper The Cameron Collegian whose main audience is Cameron University students. Additionally, Okie Magazine is a monthly magazine that focuses on news and entertainment in the Southwest Oklahoma area. Fletcher News publishes online news of northeastern Comanche County, including Fletcher, Elgin and Sterling.

Radio stations in Lawton include, two AM Stations KXCA 1050 and KKRX 1380 as well as several FM stations including, NPR affiliate KCCU 89.3, KZCD 94.1, KMGZ 95.3, KJMZ 97.9, KBZQ 99.5, KLAW-FM 101.3 and KVRW 107.3

Comanche County is located in the Wichita Falls and Lawton Media Market which encompasses 154,450 households with a television, making it the 149th largest in the nation according to Nelson Media Research in 2009–2010. KSWO-TV channel 7, an ABC affiliate, is the only broadcast television station in the area that provides local news. All other major stations including, KFDX-TV 3 (NBC), KAUZ-TV (CBS), and KJTL-TV (Fox) are based in Wichita Falls.

== Transportation ==
=== Major highways ===
- I-44 / H.E. Bailey Turnpike
- US 62
- US 277
- US 281
- SH-7
- SH-36
- SH-49
- SH-58
- SH-65
- SH-115
- SH-281A

=== Bus lines ===
- Lawton Area Transit System (LATS)
- Greyhound Lines
- Jefferson Lines (until 2016)

=== Air ===
Lawton-Fort Sill Regional Airport (LAW, KLAW)

== Education ==
=== K-12 education ===
The following K-12 school districts include parts of the county.

- Boone-Apache Public Schools
- Cache Public Schools
- Cement Public Schools
- Central High Public Schools
- Chattanooga Public Schools
- Cyril Public Schools
- Elgin Public Schools
- Empire Public Schools
- Fletcher Public Schools
- Geronimo Public Schools
- Indiahoma Public Schools
- Lawton Public Schools
- Mountain View-Gotebo Schools
- Snyder Public Schools
- Sterling Public Schools
- Walters Public Schools

Elementary only districts include Bishop Public School and Flower Mound Public School. Residents of the Bishop and Flower Mound districts go to Lawton Public Schools for middle and high school grades.

The largest school district is Lawton Public Schools which had 16,398 in 2009. The district operates two pre-kindergarten centers, twenty-six elementary schools, four middle schools, and three high schools – Eisenhower, Lawton, and MacArthur. Other major school districts in the area include Cache Public Schools and Elgin Public Schools. Cache Public Schools had an enrollment of 1,648 and consists of five schools. Elgin Public Schools had an enrollment of 16,98 and three schools. Other public school districts in the region include, Bishop Chattanooga, Fletcher, Flower Mound, Geronimo, Indiahoma, and Sterling.

Comanche County includes several private schools. The largest is Lawton Christian School with an enrollment of 426 students in 2009. Lawton Academy of Arts & Science offers classes from PK-12 and had an enrollment of 115. St. Mary's Catholic School offers classes for elementary and middle school. Trinity Christian Academy offers classes from K-3 through the 8th grade.

=== Tertiary education ===
There is one university in Comanche County, Cameron University. Cameron is the largest four year, state-funded university, in southwest Oklahoma, offering more than 50 degree programs in areas of Business, Education, Liberal Arts and Science and Technology. Founded in 1909, Cameron has an average fall enrollment of 6,000 students with 70 endowed faculty positions.

Comanche County is also served by the Great Plains Technology Center, which is part of the Oklahoma Department of Career and Technology Education System. Great Plains provides occupational education, training, and development opportunities to area residents.

== Healthcare ==
Comanche County has three major hospitals in the area. The largest, Comanche County Memorial Hospital, is a 283-bed non-profit hospital that employs 250 physicians. Southwestern Medical Center is a 199-bed hospital with a staff of 150 physicians. In addition, the U.S. Public Health Lawton Indian Hospital is located in the city to provide health services for the large American Indian population. It has 26 beds with a staff of 23 physicians.

== Communities ==
=== Cities ===
- Cache
- Elgin
- Lawton (county seat)

=== Towns ===
- Chattanooga
- Faxon
- Fletcher
- Geronimo
- Indiahoma
- Medicine Park
- Sterling

=== Census-designated places ===
- Edgewater Park
- Lake Ellsworth Addition
- Lakeside Village
- Lawtonka Acres

=== Other unincorporated communities ===
- Bethel
- Meers
- Pumpkin Center

== Notable people ==
Notable residents include country singers: Bryan White, Kelly Willis, and Leon Russell, Grammy nominated jazz trombonist Conrad Herwig, and Flaming Lips drummer Steven Drozd. Notable authors include Pulitzer Prize winning author N. Scott Momaday, poet Don Blanding, and Hugo Award winner, C. J. Cherryh.

Politicians from Comanche County include: U.S. Senator Thomas Gore, US Representatives: Scott Ferris, L. M. Gensman, Toby Morris, and Elmer Thomas. Other politicians include Democratic State Senator Randy Bass and former U.S. Ambassador to Czechoslovakia Julian Niemczyk.

Other notable residents include: World War II Comanche Code Talker Charles Chibitty, World War II Nurse and POW Col. Rosemary Hogan, Academy Award winning actress Joan Crawford, World War II ace Robert S. Johnson, three time NBA champion Stacey King, former NBA All-Star Michael Ray Richardson, Miss America 2007 Lauren Nelson, infamous University of Oklahoma quarterback Charles Thompson, NFL Pro Bowlers Will Shields and Jammal Brown

Quanah Parker built his final residence in the town of Cache, Comanche County.

== See also ==
- National Register of Historic Places listings in Comanche County, Oklahoma
