= Lawton Constitution =

Newspaper in Lawton, Oklahoma

The Lawton Constitution
- Type: Daily newspaper
- Format: Broadsheet
- Owner(s): Lawton Publishing Company, LLC
- Publisher: Dustin Hilliary, Edward Hilliary,
- Editor-in-chief: JJ Francais
- Staff writers: Mike W. Ray, M. Scott Carter, Scott Rains, Murray Evans
- Founded: 1902
- Political alignment: Conservative
- Headquarters: Lawton, Oklahoma
- Circulation: 5,050
- Sister newspapers: Southwest Ledger
- Website: swoknews.com

The Lawton Constitution is a daily newspaper published in Lawton, Oklahoma.

== History ==
The newspaper began publishing in 1902. John Shepler bought the paper in 1910. It remained with successive generations of Shepler's family until his great-grandsons, Don and Steve Bentley, sold the paper on March 1, 2012, to brothers Bill and Brad Burgess, who are lawyers and businessmen in Lawton. The brothers sold the paper to Southern Newspapers, Inc. in April 2018. Hilliary family bought the paper in September 2025.
