= Cache, Oklahoma =

City in Oklahoma, US

Cache, Oklahoma Pisi Narʉmʉʉ (Comanche)
- City
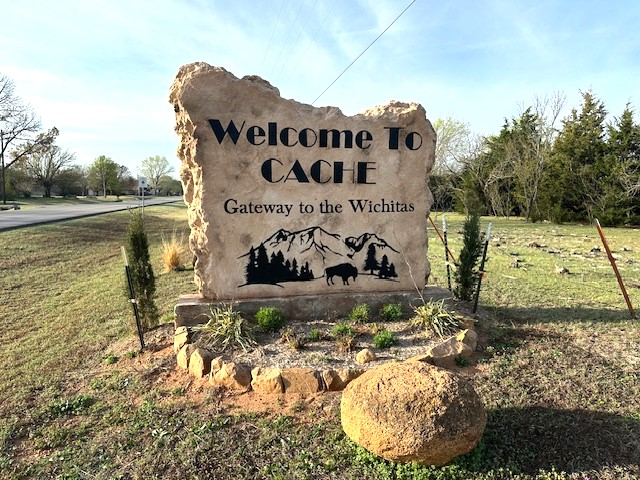
- Welcome sign at Cache OK in 3-2025

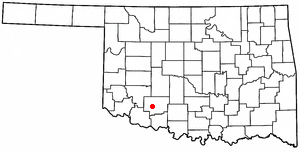
- Location of Cache, Oklahoma
- Coordinates: 34°37′36″N 98°37′46″W
- Country: United States
- State: Oklahoma
- County: Comanche

Government
  - Type: Aldermanic
  - Mayor: David "Paco" Ridgway

Area
  - Total: 3.66 sq mi (9.48 km^{2})
  - Land: 3.64 sq mi (9.44 km^{2})
  - Water: 0.015 sq mi (0.04 km^{2})
- Elevation: 1,247 ft (380 m)

Population (2020)
  - Total: 2,930
  - Density: 803.8/sq mi (310.33/km^{2})
- Time zone: UTC-6 (Central (CST))
  - Summer (DST): UTC-5 (CDT)
- ZIP code: 73527
- Area code: 580
- FIPS code: 40-10700
- GNIS feature ID: 2409952
- Website: Cache, OK

Cache is a city in Comanche County, Oklahoma, United States. As of the 2020 census, Cache had a population of 2,930. It is an exurb included in the Lawton, Oklahoma Metropolitan Statistical Area. It is the location of Star House, the home of the Comanche chief Quanah Parker, the major leader of the Quahadi Comanche in the years of Indian Wars and transition to reservation life.

== Geography ==
According to the United States Census Bureau, Cache has a total area of 3.4 square miles (8.8 km^{2}), of which 3.4 square miles (8.8 km^{2}) is land and 0.29% is water.

== Demographics ==
Historical population
Census	Pop.	Note	%±
1910	317		—
1920	382		20.5%
1930	425		11.3%
1940	620		45.9%
1950	677		9.2%
1960	1,003		48.2%
1970	1,106		10.3%
1980	1,661		50.2%
1990	2,251		35.5%
2000	2,371		5.3%
2010	2,796		17.9%
2020	2,930		4.8%
U.S. Decennial Census

=== 2020 census ===
As of the 2020 census, Cache had a population of 2,930. The median age was 33.6 years. 29.8% of residents were under the age of 18 and 14.4% of residents were 65 years of age or older. For every 100 females there were 97.4 males, and for every 100 females age 18 and over there were 92.5 males age 18 and over.

<0.1% of residents lived in urban areas, while 100.0% lived in rural areas.

There were 1,119 households in Cache, of which 40.2% had children under the age of 18 living in them. Of all households, 48.3% were married-couple households, 17.9% were households with a male householder and no spouse or partner present, and 28.2% were households with a female householder and no spouse or partner present. About 26.5% of all households were made up of individuals and 11.4% had someone living alone who was 65 years of age or older.

There were 1,250 housing units, of which 10.5% were vacant. Among occupied housing units, 65.8% were owner-occupied and 34.2% were renter-occupied. The homeowner vacancy rate was 1.5% and the rental vacancy rate was 10.1%.

Racial composition as of the 2020 census
Race	Percent
White	63.5%
Black or African American	4.1%
American Indian and Alaska Native	14.9%
Asian	0.7%
Native Hawaiian and Other Pacific Islander	0.3%
Some other race	2.3%
Two or more races	14.2%
Hispanic or Latino (of any race)	10.4%

=== 2010 census ===
As of the 2010 census, there were 2,796 people, 1,037 households, and 780 families residing in the city. The population density was 795.9 inhabitants per square mile (307.3/km^{2}). There were 1,140 housing units at an average density of 324.5 per square mile (125.3/km^{2}). The racial makeup of the city was 70.8% White, 2.5% African American, 18.6% Native American (13.45% Comanche), 0.4% Asian, 0.3% Pacific Islander, 0.09% from other races, and 6.5% from two or more races. Hispanic or Latino of any race were 6.1% of the population.

There were 1,037 households, out of which 42.3% had children under the age of 18 living with them, 52.1% were married couples living together, 16.0% had a female householder with no husband present, and 24.8% were non-families. 21.5% of all households were made up of individuals, and 8.0% had someone living alone who was 65 years of age or older. The average household size was 2.70 and the average family size was 3.10.

In the city, the population was spread out, with 28.1% under the age of 18, 9.0% from 18 to 24, 26.5% from 25 to 44, 24.0% from 45 to 64, and 11.3% who were 65 years of age or older. The median age was 33.2 years. For every 100 females, there were 95.8 males. For every 100 females age 18 and over, there were 92.6 males.

The median income for a household in the city was $41,220, and the median income for a family was $51,840. Males had a median income of $48,672 versus $33,051 for females. The per capita income for the city was $19,299. About 10.0% of families and 17.1% of the population were below the poverty line, including 19.5% of those under age 18 and 18.1% of those age 65 or over.

== Government ==
Cache uses the Aldermanic model of municipal government. The city's primary authority resides in the City Council which approves ordinances, resolutions, and contracts. The city is divided into four wards with each ward electing a single city council representative for a four-year term. The mayor, who is elected every four years, presides and sets the agenda over the City Council is primarily ceremonial as a head of government. The mayor is the chief executive officer of the executive branch and has the power to prepare an annual budget, appoint heads of departments with city council confirmation, remove or suspend city employees, enforce city ordinances, and grant pardons for city violations with council approval.

At the federal level, Cache lies in Oklahoma 4th Congressional district, represented by Tom Cole. In the State Senate, Cache is in District 32 represented by Dusty Deevers. In the House, District 63 covers the city, represented by Trey Caldwell.

== Historic structures ==
There are multiple NRHP-listed places in Cache, including:

- Quanah Parker Star House
- Buffalo Lodge
- Ingram House
- Ferguson House
- Boulder Cabin
- Arrastra Site
- Eagle Park

== Notable people ==
- John Paul Brammer, writer, artist, and advice columnist who grew up in Cache.

== Gallery ==
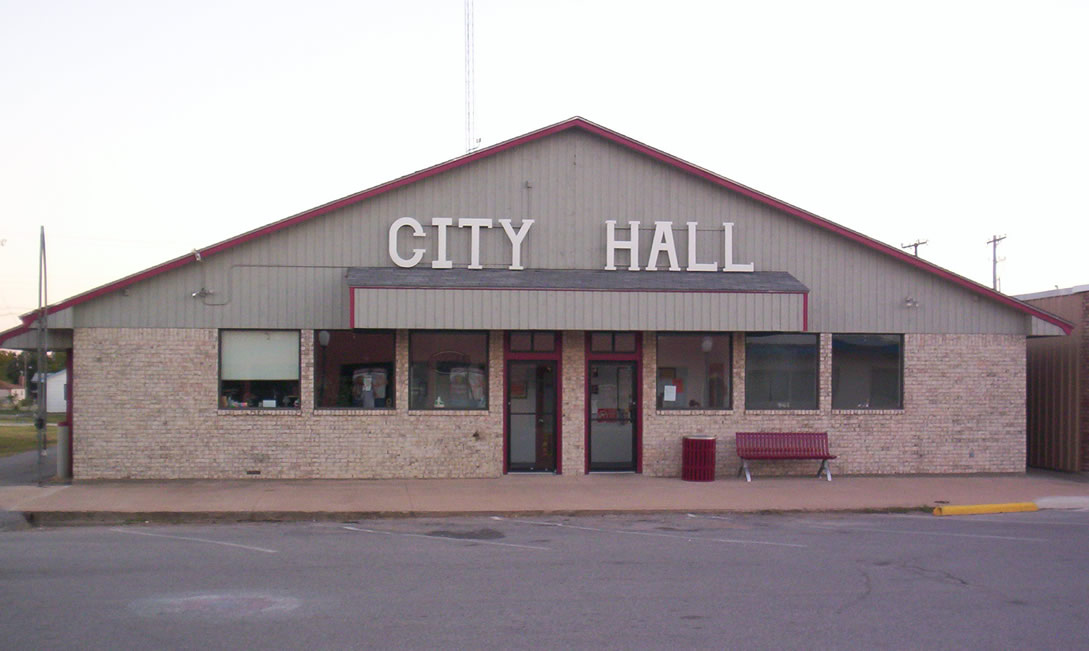
City Hall

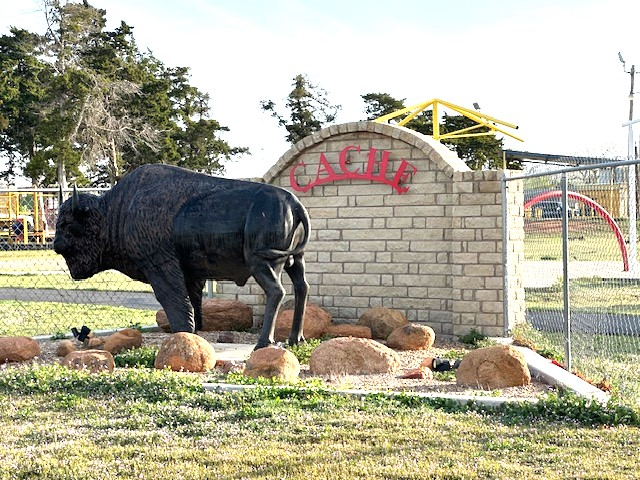
Buffalo statue in park, 3-2025

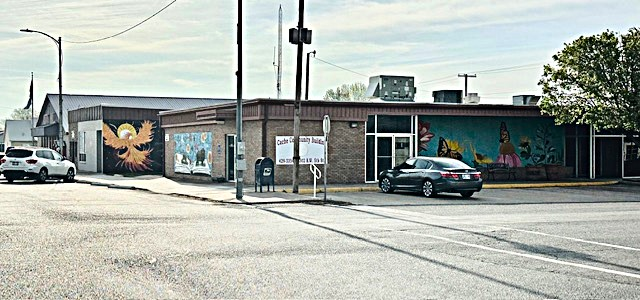
Community Building, 3-2025

== See also ==
- Cache Public Schools
