= Elgin, Oklahoma =

City in Oklahoma, US

- City
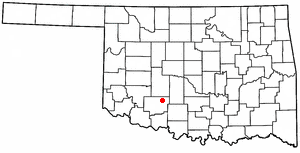
- Location of Elgin, Oklahoma
- Coordinates: 34°47′05″N 98°18′03″W
- Country: United States
- State: Oklahoma
- County: Comanche

Area
  - Total: 3.75 sq mi (9.71 km^{2})
  - Land: 3.74 sq mi (9.68 km^{2})
  - Water: 0.015 sq mi (0.04 km^{2})
- Elevation: 1,273 ft (388 m)

Population (2020)
  - Total: 3,656
  - Density: 978.7/sq mi (377.86/km^{2})
- Time zone: UTC-6 (Central (CST))
  - Summer (DST): UTC-5 (CDT)
- ZIP code: 73538
- Area code: 580
- FIPS code: 40-23450
- GNIS feature ID: 2410421
- Website: cityofelginok.com

Elgin is a city in northeastern Comanche County, Oklahoma, United States. The population was 3,656 at the time of the 2020 Census, a 69.6% increase over the 2,156 reported in the 2010 census, which was itself a 78% increase from the 1,210 reported at the 2000 census. It is included in the Lawton, Oklahoma Metropolitan Statistical Area. It is located about 16 miles north-northeast of Lawton at the intersection of US Route 277 with the western terminus of Oklahoma State Highway 17. It is the site of Fort Sill National Cemetery.

== History ==
Elgin developed as the Oklahoma City and Western Railroad (OCWR) (later absorbed by the St. Louis–San Francisco Railway) constructed a line from Chickasha, Oklahoma to Lawton, Oklahoma between 1901 and 1903. A post office was established in April 1902 and named "Ceegee", derived from Charles G. Jones, president of the OCWR and developer of the town. The railroad management objected to this name and demanded that it be changed. This was done in July 1902.

== Geography ==
According to the United States Census Bureau, the city has a total area of 3.718 square miles (9.63 km^{2}), all land.

=== Climate ===
Climate is characterized by relatively high temperatures and evenly distributed precipitation throughout the year. The Köppen Climate Classification subtype for this climate is "Cfa" (Humid Subtropical Climate).

Climate data for Elgin, Oklahoma
Month	Jan	Feb	Mar	Apr	May	Jun	Jul	Aug	Sep	Oct	Nov	Dec	Year
Record high °F (°C)	83 (28)	85 (29)	101 (38)	99 (37)	105 (41)	112 (44)	111 (44)	109 (43)	108 (42)	100 (38)	87 (31)	87 (31)	112 (44)
Mean daily maximum °F (°C)	49 (9)	54 (12)	63 (17)	73 (23)	80 (27)	89 (32)	94 (34)	94 (34)	86 (30)	75 (24)	62 (17)	52 (11)	73 (23)
Mean daily minimum °F (°C)	28 (−2)	33 (1)	40 (4)	51 (11)	59 (15)	68 (20)	72 (22)	71 (22)	64 (18)	53 (12)	40 (4)	31 (−1)	51 (11)
Record low °F (°C)	−6 (−21)	2 (−17)	1 (−17)	24 (−4)	35 (2)	46 (8)	57 (14)	54 (12)	37 (3)	26 (−3)	13 (−11)	−5 (−21)	−6 (−21)
Average precipitation inches (mm)	1.2 (30)	1.5 (38)	2 (51)	2.6 (66)	5.4 (140)	3.8 (97)	2.5 (64)	2.3 (58)	3.3 (84)	3.4 (86)	1.7 (43)	1.3 (33)	31 (790)
Average snowfall inches (cm)	2.6 (6.6)	2.0 (5.1)	0.8 (2.0)	0.2 (0.51)	1.2 (3.0)	—	—	—	—	—	—	—	6.9 (18)
Average rainy days	5	5	6	7	9	7	6	6	6	6	5	5	73
Source 1: weather.com
Source 2: Weatherbase.com

== Demographics ==
Historical population
Census	Pop.	Note	%±
1910	178		—
1920	181		1.7%
1930	335		85.1%
1940	381		13.7%
1950	428		12.3%
1960	540		26.2%
1970	840		55.6%
1980	1,003		19.4%
1990	975		−2.8%
2000	1,210		24.1%
2010	2,156		78.2%
2020	3,656		69.6%
U.S. Decennial Census

=== 2020 census ===
As of the 2020 census, Elgin had a population of 3,656. The median age was 32.2 years. 33.5% of residents were under the age of 18 and 8.4% of residents were 65 years of age or older. For every 100 females there were 95.1 males, and for every 100 females age 18 and over there were 94.4 males age 18 and over.

0% of residents lived in urban areas, while 100.0% lived in rural areas.

There were 1,194 households in Elgin, of which 51.9% had children under the age of 18 living in them. Of all households, 63.4% were married-couple households, 13.3% were households with a male householder and no spouse or partner present, and 19.2% were households with a female householder and no spouse or partner present. About 17.5% of all households were made up of individuals and 5.7% had someone living alone who was 65 years of age or older.

There were 1,323 housing units, of which 9.8% were vacant. Among occupied housing units, 70.0% were owner-occupied and 30.0% were renter-occupied. The homeowner vacancy rate was 4.6% and the rental vacancy rate was 10.0%.

Racial composition as of the 2020 census
Race	Percent
White	67.7%
Black or African American	5.5%
American Indian and Alaska Native	5.6%
Asian	2.1%
Native Hawaiian and Other Pacific Islander	0.6%
Some other race	3.3%
Two or more races	15.2%
Hispanic or Latino (of any race)	13.8%

=== 2010 census ===
As of the 2010 census, there were 2,156 people, 759 households, and 619 families residing in the city. The population density was 582.3 inhabitants per square mile (224.8/km^{2}). There were 759 housing units at an average density of 205.1 per square mile (79.2/km^{2}). The racial makeup of the city was 78.8% White, 4.7% African American, 8.6% Native American, 1.3% Asian, 0.3% Pacific Islander, 1.2% from other races, and 5.2% from two or more races. Hispanic or Latino of any race were 8.5% of the population.

There were 759 households, out of which 44.0% had children under the age of 18 living with them, 63.4% were married couples living together, 13.7% had a female householder with no husband present, and 18.4% were non-families. 16.2% of all households were made up of individuals, and 16.2% had someone living alone who was 65 years of age or older. The average household size was 2.84 and the average family size was 3.16.

In the city, the population was spread out, with 32.0% under the age of 18, 7.1% from 18 to 24, 31.5% from 25 to 44, 19.5% from 45 to 64, and 9.9% who were 65 years of age or older. The median age was 32.6 years. For every 100 females, there were 95.5 males. For every 100 females age 18 and over, there were 107.2 males.

=== 2000 census ===
According to the 2000 census, the median income for a household in the city was $36,324, and the median income for a family was $44,125. Males had a median income of $32,019 versus $22,614 for females. The per capita income for the city was $14,264. About 7.4% of families and 9.7% of the population were below the poverty line, including 11.2% of those under age 18 and 12.6% of those age 65 or over.

== Education ==
The school district is Elgin Public Schools. Its comprehensive high school is Elgin High School.

== Utilities ==
- Telephone, Internet, and Digital TV Services is provided by Hilliary Communications.
- Elgin supplies municipal water from the Rush Springs aquifer, via four wells east of town. Elgin maintains a sewage lagoon east of town, the billing for which is included on the water bill. Garbage collection service is through the Multiple Community Services Authority and is also included on the water bill.
- Electric service is provided by American Electric Power Public Service Company of Oklahoma.
- Natural gas service is provided by Arkla Gas.
