= They Marched into Sunlight =

2004 book by David Maraniss

- First edition cover
- Author: David Maraniss
- Language: English
- Genre: Vietnam, War, Historical Nonfiction
- Publisher: Simon & Schuster
- Publication date: September 28, 2004
- Publication place: United States
- Media type: Hardcover and Trade Paperback
- Pages: 572
- ISBN: 0-7432-6104-6
- OCLC: 57225083

They Marched into Sunlight: War and Peace, Vietnam and America, October 1967 is a 2004 book written by David Maraniss. The book centers around the Battle of Ong Thanh and a protest at the University of Wisconsin–Madison.

It was a finalist for the Pulitzer Prize for History in 2004 and won the J. Anthony Lukas Book Prize that same year.

== Individuals mentioned ==
- Terry de la Mesa Allen Jr., commander of 2nd Battalion, 28th Infantry Regiment, U.S. 1st Infantry Division, son of major general Terry de la Mesa Allen, killed in action in Vietnam on October 17, 1967
- Lt. Clark Welch
- Donald Holleder
- Vo Minh Triet
- Paul Soglin
- Jack Schroder
- Carl Woody Woodard
- Peter Coyote
- Dick Cheney
- Lynne Cheney

== Adaptations ==
The 2005 documentary film Two Days in October is based on the book and aired as part of the PBS series American Experience, winning a Peabody Award. In the UK, it was broadcast by BBC Four as How Vietnam Was Lost as part of the channel's Storyville series.

In 2011, a contemporary dance work inspired by the book, Into Sunlight was premiered at the University of Wisconsin–Madison. The performance was part of the larger Sunlight Project and Symposium series which included 9 other events. A documentary based on the dance work, Into Sunlight - The Film, was released in 2017.

== Editions ==
- ISBN 0743217802; September 23, 2003, Simon & Schuster, 592 pages (Hardcover)
- ISBN 0743261046; September 28, 2004, Simon & Schuster, 572 pages (Trade Paperback)
