= Two Days in October =

- Genre: Documentary film
- Based on: They Marched into Sunlight by David Maraniss
- Directed by: Robert Kenner
- Country of origin: United States
- Original language: English

Production
- Producer: Robert Kenner
- Cinematography: Buddy Squires
- Editor: Kim Roberts
- Production company: Robert Kenner Films

Original release
- Network: PBS
- Release: October 17, 2005

Two Days in October is a 2005 documentary film about the Battle of Ong Thanh and the protest at the University of Wisconsin–Madison during the Vietnam War. Both events occurred in October 1967. The film aired on the PBS series American Experience during season 18. The film is based on the book, They Marched Into Sunlight written by David Maraniss. The film won a Peabody Award in 2005.

The film consists of interviews with American soldiers, their families, Viet Cong soldiers, protesting students, police officers, and university faculty and administrators. Soldiers discuss the deadly jungle ambush of American troops by a much larger Viet Cong force, while those who were at the University of Wisconsin-Madison describe how a protest against Dow Chemical, the maker of napalm, turned violent when police began clubbing protesters. Both the soldiers and students were surprised to see news stories telling a very different version of events than what they had experienced.

== See also ==
- List of American Experience episodes
