= Ralph McT. Pennell =

U.S. Army major general

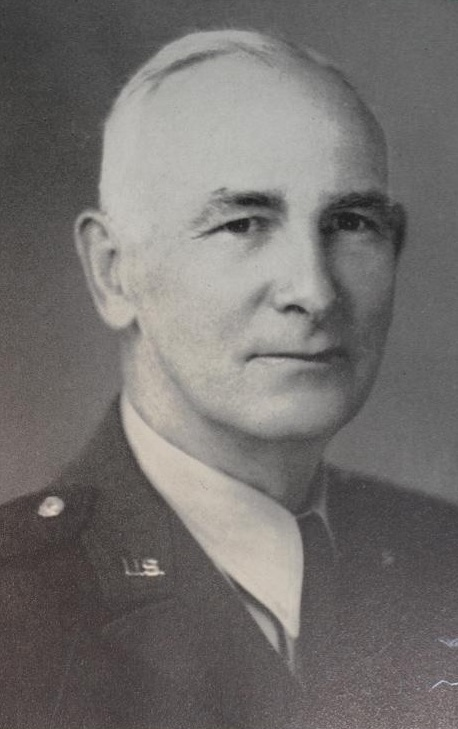
- From 1941's Pictorial History of the Twenty-Seventh Division United States Army 1940-1941
- Born: August 18, 1882; Belton, South Carolina, U.S.
- Died: May 17, 1973 (aged 90); Atlanta, Georgia, U.S.
- Burial place: Fort Sill National Cemetery
- Alma mater: United States Military Academy
- Spouse: Norma Scott Bestor (m. 1909–1967)
- Children: 4
- Military career
- Service: United States Army
- Service years: 1906–1946
- Rank: Major General
- Nickname: "Hap"
- Service number: O2150
- Unit: U.S. Army Field Artillery Branch
- Commands: 34th Field Artillery Regiment; 1st Field Artillery Regiment; 2nd Battalion, 15th Field Artillery Regiment; 15th Field Artillery Regiment; 52nd Field Artillery Brigade; 27th Infantry Division; Hawaii District; Field Artillery Replacement Training Center, Fort Sill; United States Army Field Artillery School
- Wars: World War I World War II
- Awards: Army Distinguished Service Medal (2); Legion of Merit
- Other work: Vice chairman and president, Fort Sill National Bank

Ralph McT. Pennell (August 18, 1882 – May 17, 1973) was a career officer in the United States Army. A veteran of World War I and World War II, he attained the rank of major general, and was a recipient of the Legion of Merit and two awards of the Army Distinguished Service Medal. His career spanned 1906 to 1946, and included command of the: 34th Field Artillery Regiment; 1st Field Artillery Regiment; 2nd Battalion, 15th Field Artillery Regiment; 15th Field Artillery Regiment; 52nd Field Artillery Brigade; 27th Infantry Division; Hawaii District; Field Artillery Replacement Training Center at Fort Sill; and United States Army Field Artillery School.

== Early life ==
Ralph McTyeire Pennell was born in Belton, South Carolina on August 18, 1882, a son of James Robert Pennell and Nannie Melvina (Browne) Pennell. He was raised and educated in the Martin Grove hamlet of Iva, South Carolina, and attended the Martin Grove School.

In 1901, Pennell competed for appointment to the United States Military Academy (West Point) and was chosen as an alternate. He was subsequently selected for the appointment, and he completed his entrance examination in April 1902. He passed, and joined the Class of 1906 in June 1902.

Pennell's classmates nicknamed him "Hap," short for "Happy," because of his demeanor and used the nickname throughout his life. He graduated from West Point in June 1906 ranked 54th of 78 students. Among his classmates were Jonathan M. Wainwright and Adna R. Chaffee Jr. Pennell was commissioned as a second lieutenant of Cavalry and assigned to the 13th Cavalry Regiment. From September 1906 to July 1907 he attended the Mounted Service School at Fort Riley.

== Start of career ==
In July 1907, Pennell was promoted to first lieutenant of Field Artillery and assigned to the 6th Field Artillery Regiment at Fort Riley. Pennell remained with the 6th Field Artillery until July 1911, when he was assigned as secretary of the School of Fire for Field Artillery at Fort Sill. He was transferred to the 5th Field Artillery Regiment in June 1912, but continued to serve as secretary. From July 1915 to May 1917, Pennell was assigned to duty in the Philippines as a member of the 2nd Field Artillery Regiment. He was promoted to captain in July 1916.

From June to July 1917, Pennell was assigned to World War I duty with the 18th Field Artillery Regiment at Fort Bliss, Texas. In July 1917, he returned to the School of Fire as secretary and instructor, where he remained until April 1918. He was promoted to temporary major and lieutenant colonel in August 1917. He served on the staff of the Chief of Field Artillery in Washington, D.C. from April to September 1918. In July 1918, he received promotion to temporary colonel. From September to December 1918, he commanded the 34th Field Artillery Regiment at Fort McClellan, Alabama.

The Armistice of November 11, 1918 ended the war, and in December Pennell was assigned to duty in Europe as a member of the Armament Board, which was chaired by Brigadier General William I. Westervelt. The Westervelt Board assessed the experiences of field artillery units during the war and planned the future direction of U.S. Army artillery. The board's work took Pennell to France, England, Italy, and Germany, and he returned to the United States in June 1919. From July to November 1919, Pennell was head of the Materiel section in office of the Chief of Field Artillery. In November 1919, he took command of the 1st Field Artillery Regiment at Fort Sill, which he commanded until June 1921. In February 1920, Pennell was reduced to the permanent rank of major.

== Continued career ==
From September 1920 to September 1922, Pennell served as a member of the Field Artillery Board that reviewed artillery weapons and equipment and made procurement recommendations to the Chief of Field Artillery. He was then assigned as a student at the United States Army Command and General Staff College, which he completed in August 1923 as a Distinguished Graduate. From August 1923 to February 1924, Pennell was executive officer of the 1st Field Artillery Brigade at Fort Hoyle, Maryland. From February 1924 to August 1926, he served as the Chief of Field Artillery's liaison officer to the Ordnance Corps at Aberdeen Proving Ground, Maryland.

From August 1927 to June 1927, Pennell was a student at the United States Army War College. He was then assigned to take the course at the Naval War College, from which he graduated in September 1928. From October 1928 to December 1930, Pennell served on the staff of the Hawaiian Division at Schofield Barracks. In January 1930, he was promoted to permanent lieutenant colonel. In December 1930, he was assigned to the Eighth Corps Area at Fort Sam Houston, Texas as assistant chief of staff for logistics (G-4).

== Later career ==
In September 1932, Pennell was assigned to command 2nd Battalion, 15th Field Artillery Regiment at Fort Sam Houston. In February 1935, he assumed command of the 15th Field Artillery at Fort Bragg, North Carolina, and in August he received promotion to colonel. In July 1936, Pennell was appointed president of a board that considered options for modernizing the Field Artillery branch and made recommendations to the Chief of Field Artillery. In July 1939, he resumed command of the 15th Artillery. In September 1939, he was assigned as a student at a refresher course for Field Artillery officers. After graduating in November, he performed detached staff duty at Fort Sill.

In October 1940, Pennell was assigned to Fort McClellan, Alabama as commander of the 52nd Field Artillery Brigade, a unit of the 27th Infantry Division. In January 1941, he was promoted to brigadier general, and he continued to lead the brigade during its pre-World War II organization and training. In November 1941, he was assigned to command the 27th Division during its organization and training at Fort Ord, California. He was promoted to major general in February 1942. In March 1942, Pennell was appointed to command the Hawaii District, the army command formed after the December 1941 Attack on Pearl Harbor to coordinate the territory's defenses.

In October 1942, Pennell was assigned to Newark, New Jersey as a member of the War Department Dependency Board, which established policies and procedures with respect to releasing information about killed and wounded soldiers to next-of-kin. In March 1943, he was posted to Fort Sill as commander of the Field Artillery Replacement Training Center, which provided initial skill training to trainees prior to their deployment overseas. In November 1944, Pennell was named commandant of the Field Artillery School, an assignment he carried out while continuing to command the replacement center. He completed his command assignments in August 1945, after which he performed special duties as assigned while he awaited retirement. He retired in August 1946.

== Awards ==
Pennell was a recipient of the Army Distinguished Service Medal for his First World War service. He received a second award of the Distinguished Service Medal for his command of the 52nd Field Artillery Brigade, 27th Infantry Division, and Hawaii District. In addition, he received the Legion of Merit to commend his service of the Field Artillery Replacement Center and Field Artillery School.

=== Distinguished Service Medal citation (1922) ===
The President of the United States of America, authorized by Act of Congress, July 9, 1918, takes pleasure in presenting the Army Distinguished Service Medal to Colonel (Field Artillery) Ralph McTyeire Pennell, United States Army, for exceptionally meritorious and distinguished services to the Government of the United States, in a duty of great responsibility during World War I. As Assistant to the Chief of Field Artillery from 16 April 1918 to 4 September 1918, Colonel Pennell planned and executed those measures which provided a balanced production of different types of field artillery material and equipment and the selection of the types to be produced, and which determined the priorities of distribution of same.

General Orders: War Department, General Orders No. 31 (1922)

=== Distinguished Service Medal citation (1943) ===
The President of the United States of America, authorized by Act of Congress, July 9, 1918, takes pleasure in presenting a Bronze Oak Leaf Cluster in lieu of a Second Award of the Army Distinguished Service Medal to Major General Ralph McTyeire Pennell (ASN: 0-2150), United States Army, for exceptionally meritorious and distinguished services to the Government of the United States, in a duty of great responsibility as Commanding General of an Infantry Division in the Hawaiian Department during the period 15 March 1942 to 1 November 1942. By outstanding ability, leadership, and energy, General Pennell brought his Division to a high degree of training and readiness for combat conditions. He showed remarkable ability in the disposition of his troops and in the location of positions with his command. As representative of the Military Governor of the Island of Hawaii, he personally solved the problems concerned with the government of this island, which has a large alien and alien descendent population. By reason of his qualities as an officer, a very difficult situation was handled in a superior manner and military civilian relationships were greatly improved. The singularly distinctive accomplishments of General Pennell reflect the highest credit upon himself and the United States Army.

General Orders: War Department, General Orders No. 2 (1943)

=== Legion of Merit citation ===
Major General Ralph McT. Pennell performed outstanding service from April 1943 to August 1945 as commanding general, Field Artillery Replacement Center and as commandant, Field Artillery School, Fort Sill, Oklahoma. He restored the replacement training center, instituting a centralized personnel system which increased the efficiency of operations and effected savings of overhead personnel, and inaugurated training inspection teams to uncover flaws in procedures and to eliminate incompetent instructors. In all, some 40,000 replacements for the field artillery were trained under his supervision. As commandant of the field artillery school he carried out many important projects including the Metro Augmentation program, (Note: "Metro" was the Field Artillery's term for meteorological data that had to be incorporated into calculations when conducting indirect fire.) the expansion of the department of air training, the field artillery radar program and the redeployment short courses for officers and enlisted men scheduled for combat in the Pacific area.

General Orders: War Department, General Orders (1946)

== Effective dates of promotions ==
Pennell's effective dates of rank were:

- Second Lieutenant, June 12, 1906
- First Lieutenant, July 6, 1907
- Captain, July 1, 1916
- Major (temporary), August 5, 1917
- Lieutenant Colonel (temporary), August 5, 1917
- Colonel (temporary), July 30, 1918
- Major, February 24, 1920
- Lieutenant Colonel, January 21, 1930
- Colonel, August 1, 1935
- Brigadier General (temporary), January 29, 1941
- Major General (temporary), February 26, 1942
- Major General (retired), August 31, 1946

== Later life ==
After retiring from the army, Pennell resided in Lawton, Oklahoma and served as vice chairman and president of the Fort Sill National Bank. He died in Atlanta, Georgia on May 17, 1973 after he was stricken with a heart attack at the city's airport while en route to a family reunion in South Carolina. Pennell was buried at Fort Sill National Cemetery.

== Family ==
In 1909, Pennell married Norma Scott Bestor; she died in 1967, and Pennell did not remarry. They were the parents of:

- Norma Katherine (1911–1978), the wife of Colonel Richard Klemm Boyd.
- Colonel Robert Pennell (1915–1961).
- Elizabeth (1918–1970), the wife of Major General Osmund A. Leahy.
- Margaret (1920-1953), whose health condition caused her to reside with her parents throughout her life.

== Works by ==
- "Training Gun Crews". The Field Artillery Journal. Washington, DC: United States Field Artillery Association. July–September 1918. pp. 387–391 – via Google Books.
- "The Experiment of Equipping A Light Regiment of Field Artillery With Tractors". The Field Artillery Journal. Washington, DC: United States Field Artillery Association. September–October 1921. pp. 460–475 – via Google Books.
- "A Field Artillery Viewpoint of Ordnance Development". The Field Artillery Journal. Washington, DC: United States Field Artillery Association. May–June 1926. pp. 226–240 – via Google Books.
