= Osmund A. Leahy =

American Army general

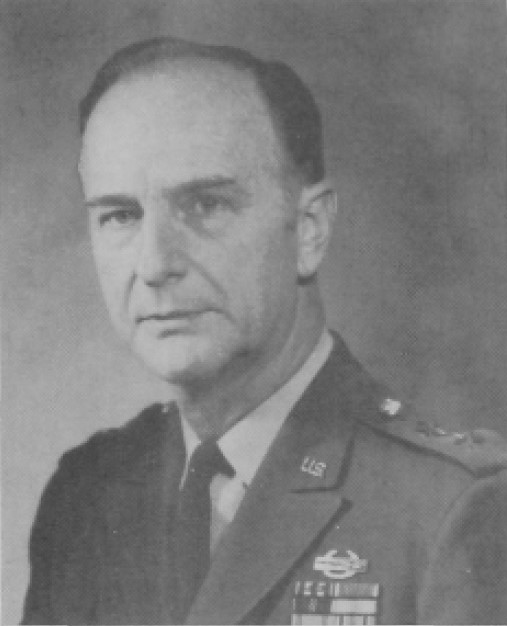
- Nickname: Oz
- Born: 31 August 1915; Oswego, New York
- Died: 9 December 1989 (aged 74) Bethesda, Maryland
- Allegiance: United States
- Branch: United States Army (1940–1977); United States Navy (1934–1936)
- Service years: 1940–1977
- Rank: Major General
- Commands: 7th Infantry Division; II Corps; 505th Airborne Infantry Regiment; 3rd Battalion, 325th Glider Infantry; 2nd Battalion, 325th Glider Infantry
- Conflicts: World War II
- Awards: Distinguished Service Medal; Silver Star Medal (3); Legion of Merit (2); Bronze Star Medal

Osmund Alfred Leahy (31 August 1915 – 9 December 1989) was a retired United States Army major general. He was a highly decorated airborne infantry leader during World War II. Leahy later commanded II Corps and the 7th Infantry Division.

== Early life and education ==
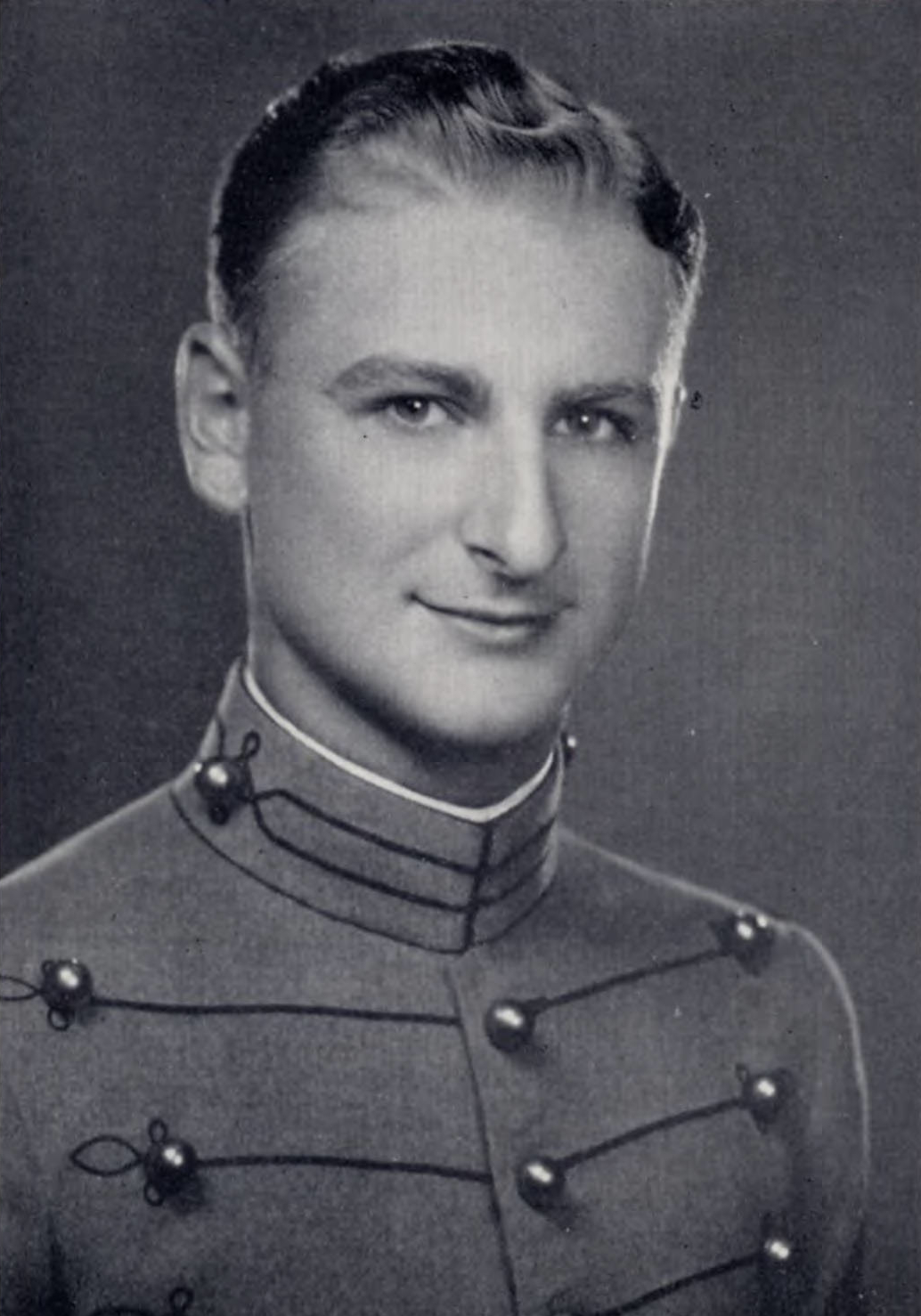
Leahy as a West Point cadet in 1940

Leahy was born and raised in Oswego, New York along with three brothers and three sisters. His father was a merchant. He graduated from high school in 1934 and, unable to afford the tuition at Cornell University, enlisted in the United States Navy on 14 August 1934. After two years of service on a destroyer in the Atlantic, he received an appointment to the United States Military Academy. He graduated from West Point with a B.S. degree in engineering in June 1940. Leahy then attended the Infantry School at Fort Benning, Georgia from August to November 1940.

During World War II, Leahy graduated from the Command and General Staff School in April 1943. He later graduated from the Army War College in July 1956 and earned an M.S. degree in public administration from George Washington University in 1968.

== Military career ==
Leahy was initially assigned to the 38th Infantry at Fort Sam Houston, Texas. In 1942, he was transferred to the 82nd Airborne Division at Fort Bragg, North Carolina. Leahy was promoted to major in January 1943 and then served with the division in North Africa. He participated in the invasion of Sicily and then in the landings at Salerno, Italy.

In June 1944, Leahy participated in the invasion of Normandy and temporarily assumed command of the 2nd Battalion, 325th Glider Infantry after his commanding officer was gravely wounded. A few days later, he assumed command of the 3rd Battalion, 325th Glider Infantry after the unit suffered significant casualties and lost three commanding officers in five days. Leahy reorganized the unit into an effective fighting force and continued to lead it until May 1945. He participated in Operation Market Garden, dropping into Nijmegen in September 1944. Leahy was promoted to lieutenant colonel on 16 December 1944, and then participated in the Allied counterattack during the Battle of the Bulge. He earned three Silver Stars for his bravery and leadership in combat.

After the war, Leahy served as an instructor at the Infantry School at Fort Benning before returning to Fort Bragg. While conducting a test jump with a new type of parachute, it opened too rapidly, breaking both of his collarbones and catching on the airplane tail section. Leahy had to cut himself loose with his knife and land using his reserve chute. From 1953 to 1955, he served with the Military Assistance Group in the Philippines. Leahy was promoted to colonel in July 1955.

After attending the Army War College, Leahy served as commander of the 505th Airborne Infantry Regiment at Fort Bragg. From 1961 to 1962, he served with the Military Assistance Group in South Korea. From 1962 to 1964, Leahy taught at Air University in Alabama.

In September 1964, Leahy was promoted to brigadier general and then served as chief of the Military Training Mission in Saudi Arabia until August 1966. From 1966 to 1967, he served as chief of staff of XVIII Airborne Corps at Fort Bragg.

Promoted to major general in 1967, Leahy served as commanding general of II Corps at Fort Wadsworth, New York. In 1968, he served as commanding general of the 7th Infantry Division in South Korea. Leahy then became head of the Institute of Land Combat at Fort Belvoir, Virginia.

From 1970 to 1972, Leahy was chief of staff and deputy commanding general of the 6th Army at the Presidio of San Francisco. He retired in 1972, but was immediately recalled to active duty as head of the Military Disability Agency at the Walter Reed Medical Center in Washington, D.C. Leahy retired again in 1977.

During his career, Leahy received the Distinguished Service Medal, two awards of the Legion of Merit and a Bronze Star Medal.

== Personal ==
In December 1941, Leahy married Elizabeth Pennell (8 October 1918 – 22 January 1970), the daughter of Major General Ralph McT. Pennell. They had two daughters, two sons and four grandchildren. After her death, he married Patricia Marilyn (Strand) Dorn (11 September 1925 – 28 October 2009), who had also been widowed, in December 1971.

In 1972, Leahy and his second wife moved to Bethesda, Maryland. In 1988, he was diagnosed with lung cancer. After apparently successful treatment, they moved to Chevy Chase. Leahy subsequently developed an inoperable, malignant brain tumor and died at a nursing home in Bethesda in 1989. He was buried at Arlington National Cemetery on 13 December 1989.
