= 34th Field Artillery Regiment =

US military unit

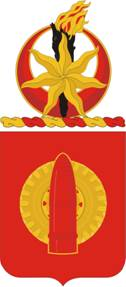
- Coat of arms
- Active: 1918
- Country: United States
- Branch: Army
- Type: Field artillery
- Motto: WE SUPPORT

Commanders
- Notable commanders: William Westmoreland

Insignia
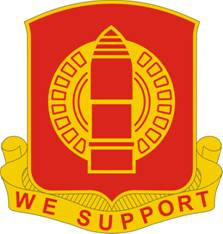
- Distinctive unit insignia

The 34th Field Artillery Regiment is a field artillery regiment of the United States Army.

== History ==
In August 1918, the 34th Field Artillery Regiment was activated for World War I at Fort McClellan, Alabama as a unit of 12th Field Artillery Brigade, 12th Division. It was commanded by Ralph McT. Pennell from September to December 1918. The Armistice of November 11, 1918 ended the war before the regiment departed for France, and it was inactivated in early 1919 during the post-war drawdown of army forces. The regiment was reconstituted as an inactive unit of the regular Army on July 22, 1929.

After service in the ETO, as the 34th Field Artillery Bn, it was redesignated as 2nd Bn, 34th FA, based in Munich, West Germany during the Cold War, with a 155mm M109 howitzer firing battery, a nuclear capable Honest John rocket battery, and a HQ battery. In 1969, it deployed to Fort Lewis, Washington as part of the 212th Field Artillery Group. It was a nuclear capable, 155mm self propelled unit, with three firing batteries of M109 Howitzers and a service battery. It was a REFORGER unit acting as a deterrent to the Warsaw Pact invading the Fulda Gap. The Battalion frequently conducted training exercises at McCord AFB for rapid deployment to its parent command, VII Corps, live fire exercises at the Yakima Firing Center. When the 9th Infantry Division returned from Vietnam in May 1972, its division. Artillery, the 1st Bn/34th FA Regiment replaced the 2/34 FA which was moved to Fort Knox, KY. All Battalions of the 34th are entitled to wear the Presidential Unit Citation awarded to the 34th FA for its fire support stopping the 1943 German Offensive in Tunisia. Major William Westmoreland was the commanding office.. LTC Delreed Burgesson was the distinguished battalion commander of the 2/34 1970–71.

== Distinctive unit insignia ==
- Description

A Gold color metal and enamel device 1 1/8 inches (2.9 cm) in height overall, consisting of a shield blazoned: Gules, in front of a truck wheel Or a 155 mm howitzer projectile of the first, that part on the field fimbriated of the second. Attached below the shield, a Gold scroll doubled back and inscribed “WE SUPPORT” in Red letters.

- Symbolism

The red shield and its charges indicate the character of the Regiment.

- Background

The distinctive unit insignia was originally approved for the 34th Field Artillery Regiment on 16 June 1938. It was redesignated for the 34th Field Artillery Battalion on 21 December 1940. It was redesignated for the 34th Artillery Regiment on 4 September 1958. It was redesignated for the 34th Field Artillery Regiment on 10 December 1971. The insignia was revised to update the description on 27 June 1989.

== Coat of arms ==
- Blazon
- Shield

Gules, in front of a truck wheel Or a 155 mm howitzer projectile of the first, that part on the field fimbriated of the second.

- Crest

On a wreath of the colors Or and Gules between the horns of a crescent of the second fimbriated of the first a torch in pale Sable inflamed Proper, overall an estoile of seven rays of the first. Motto WE SUPPORT.

- Symbolism
- Shield

The red shield and its charges indicate the character of the Regiment.

- Crest

The flaming torch alludes to the unit's participation in Operation Torch in North Africa during World War II. The crescent, adapted from the flag of Tunisia, alludes to the unit's completion in four days of a 777-mile motor march over the mountainous terrain of that country and the seven pointed star denotes the unit's participation in seven campaigns in Europe and Africa.

- Background

The coat or arms was originally approved for the 34th Field Artillery Regiment on 16 June 1938. It was redesignated for the 34th Field Artillery Battalion on 21 December 1940. It was redesignated for the 34th Artillery Regiment on 4 September 1958. It was amended to add a crest on 1 July 1965. It was redesignated for the 34th Field Artillery Regiment on 10 December 1971. The insignia was amended to correct the terminology in the symbolism on 27 June 1989.

== Current configuration ==
- 1st Battalion 34th Field Artillery Regiment (United States)
- 2nd Battalion 34th Field Artillery Regiment (United States)
- 3rd Battalion 34th Field Artillery Regiment (United States)
- 4th Battalion 34th Field Artillery Regiment (United States)
- 5th Battalion 34th Field Artillery Regiment (United States)
- 6th Battalion 34th Field Artillery Regiment (United States)

== See also ==
- Field Artillery Branch (United States)
