= Don Holleder =

American football player (1934–1967)

Donald Holleder
- Holleder on the cover of Sports Illustrated
- Born: August 3, 1934; Buffalo, New York, US
- Died: October 17, 1967 (aged 33); Chơn Thành District, Bình Dương Province, South Vietnam
- Burial place: Arlington National Cemetery
- Military career
- Allegiance: United States
- Branch: United States Army
- Service years: 1956–1967
- Rank: Major
- Units: 2nd Battalion, 28th Infantry Regiment, 1st Infantry Division
- Conflicts: Vietnam War: Battle of Ong Thanh †
- Awards: Distinguished Service Cross; Silver Star; Soldier's Medal; Bronze Star Medal (4); Purple Heart; Air Medal (8)

Donald Walter Holleder (August 3, 1934 – October 17, 1967) was an American college football star while attending the United States Military Academy and later assistant football coach for the United States Military Academy, who was later killed in the Vietnam War.

== Early life and football career ==
Holleder was born in Buffalo, New York, and at age 13, he and his family moved to Irondequoit, New York. He attended high school at the Aquinas Institute in nearby Rochester. He was heavily recruited by a number of top college football recruiters, including West Point's offensive coach Vince Lombardi.

He elected to enroll at the United States Military Academy at West Point. As a junior in 1954, he was named to the All-America team as an end. The following season, Army head coach Colonel Red Blaik asked him to move to quarterback. Holleder clearly lacked the skills to be a productive passer, but Blaik felt that his leadership skills were important and would help the struggling team improve. Blaik's move was ridiculed but it paid off. The team finished with a record of 6-3-0, including a rousing upset of Navy that led to Holleder's appearance on the cover of Sports Illustrated.

One of Holleder's classmates at West Point was General Norman Schwarzkopf. They both graduated in the Class of 1956.

=== 1956 NFL draft ===
The New York Giants selected Holleder in the 1956 NFL draft college draft. However, Holleder was not interested in a professional football career.

== Military career ==
After graduating from West Point, he continued to serve in the U.S. Army. Over the next ten years, he rose to the rank of major, serving posts in Hawaii and Korea, and in between returning to West Point for three years as an assistant football coach, recruiter, and scout.

=== Battle of Ong Thanh ===
In 1967, Holleder, now a major, requested to be sent to Vietnam, where he became the Operations Officer for 1st Brigade of the 1st Infantry Division.

During the Battle of Ong Thanh on Tuesday October 17, 1967, he and his commanding officer were overflying the battle in a helicopter. They observed the entire command unit on the ground had been killed and the remaining men were in serious trouble. Don volunteered to organize a rescue effort. Upon landing, Holleder secured three volunteers and rushed to the battle site. Running far in front of his volunteers, he was shot by a sniper. The volunteers who accompanied him pulled him into cover behind a tree. Before they could apply emergency first aid, Holleder died. He is interred in Arlington National Cemetery.

== Awards and decorations ==
=== Distinguished Service Cross ===
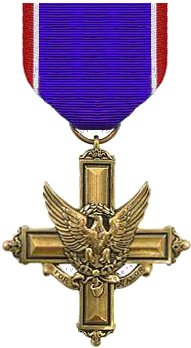

Citation:

The President of the United States of America, authorized by Act of Congress July 9, 1918, takes pride in presenting the Distinguished Service Cross (Posthumously) to Major (Infantry) Donald Walter Holleder (ASN: 0-73723), United States Army, for extraordinary heroism in action. On 17 October 1967, during Operation Shenandoah II, Major Holleder was serving as Brigade Operations Officer while accompanying his Brigade Commander in the aerial supervision of ground elements. At approximately 1100 hours, the 2d Battalion, 28th Infantry Regiment, became heavily engaged with elements of two Viet Cong battalions. The fire of the well positioned enemy caused a loss of key personnel, thereby reducing the effectiveness of the friendly unit. The Brigade Commander elected to command the embattled battalion from the ground and landed his helicopter. They then moved forward to reestablish effective command and control of the unit. With complete disregard for his personal safety, Major Holleder braved the vicious enemy fire to move through the ranks of the fighting and wounded soldiers, offering them words of encouragement and helping to establish orderly evacuation for the casualties. When the intense sniper fire impeded the evacuation of the wounded, Major Holleder unhesitatingly moved forward to reconnoiter the evacuation route. He refused to take seek cover from the deadly volleys of insurgent sniper fire and continued to assess the enemy situation until he was mortally wounded by the heavy ground fire. His tremendous courage and poise in the face of overwhelming odds had a stabilizing effect on his men and was instrumental in saving many lives. Major Holleder's unquestionable valor in close combat against numerically superior hostile forces, was in keeping with the finest traditions of the Military Service and reflects great credit upon himself, the 1st Infantry Division, and the United States Army.

=== Silver Star ===
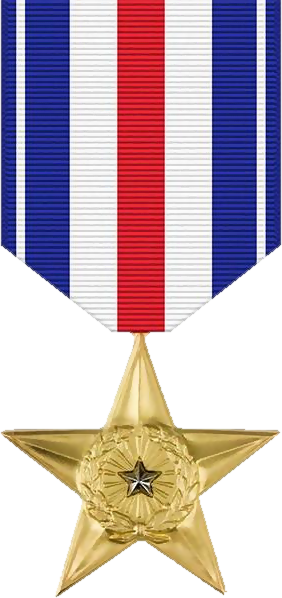

Citation:

For distinguishing himself by outstanding meritorious service in connection with ground operations against a hostile force in the Republic of Vietnam during the period July 1967 to September 1967. Through his untiring efforts and professional ability, he consistently obtained outstanding results. He was quick to grasp the implications of new problems with which he was faced as a result of the ever changing situations inherent in a counterinsurgency operation and to find ways and means to solve those problems. The energetic application of his extensive knowledge has materially contributed to the efforts of the United States mission to the Republic of Vietnam to assist that country in ridding itself of the Communist threat to its freedom. His initiative, zeal, sound judgement and devotion to duty have been in the highest tradition of the United States Army and reflect great credit on him and on the military service.

=== Commendations ===

Badge	Combat Infantryman Badge		
1st Row	Distinguished Service Cross		Silver Star
2nd Row	Soldier's Medal	Bronze Star with "V" device and 3 Oak leaf clusters	Purple Heart
3rd Row	Air Medal with "V" device and award numeral 8	Army Commendation Medal with 1 Oak leaf cluster	National Defense Service Medal with 1 Service star
4th Row	Vietnam Service Medal with 1 bronze Campaign star	Korean Defense Service Medal	Vietnam Campaign Medal with "60-" clasp
Badge	Parachutist Badge		
Unit award	Vietnamese Gallantry Cross Unit Citation (U.S. Army version)		

== Personal life ==
Holleder had a wife, Caroline, and four daughters, Stacy, Katherine, Susan, and Caroline.

== Legacy ==
In 1974, the football stadium in his hometown of Rochester was renamed Holleder Memorial Stadium in his honor. The stadium was home to the football team of his high school Alma Mater, Aquinas Institute. In 1985 the stadium was torn down where the Holleder Technology Park now stands on the site, bisected by Holleder Parkway.

In 1985, he was inducted into the College Football Hall of Fame, and that same year, West Point's basketball/hockey arena was named in his honor (The Donald W. Holleder Center). Each year, the Army football team recognizes one of their players with the Black Lion Award, given "to a player who best exemplifies the character of Don Holleder, leadership, courage, devotion to duty, self sacrifice and, above all, an unselfish concern to put the team ahead of himself."

He was posthumously awarded the Distinguished Service Cross on April 27, 2012.

David Maraniss' book They Marched Into Sunlight is currently in production for a 6-part series for FX and will include Holleder's story.

== See also ==
- 1954 College Football All-America Team
- Pat Tillman
- Bob Kalsu
