= 15th Field Artillery Regiment (United States) =

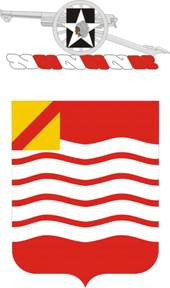
- 15th FAR Coat of Arms
- Active: 1 June 1917
- Country: United States of America
- Branch: United States Army
- Type: Field Artillery
- Role: Ground-based military warfare
- Regimental Colors: Fort Drum, New York, U.S.
- Nickname: "Fighting Fifteenth"
- Patron: Saint Barbara
- Motto: ALLONS! – "Let's Go"
- Regimental Colors: Red, Silver, Yellow
- Mascot: 75mm French Fieldgun
- Anniversaries: 1 June 2017 (100 Year Anniversary)
- Equipment Type: 155mm & 105mm Towed Howitzer cannons
- Decorations: Medals of Honor (2); Distinguished Service Cross (5); Distinguished Service Medal (1) Silver Star (407) Air Medal (20) Bronze Star (200) Purple Heart (210) French Legion of Honor (1) Belgian Order of Leopold (1) French Croix de Guerre (124) Belgian Croix de Guerre (3)

Insignia
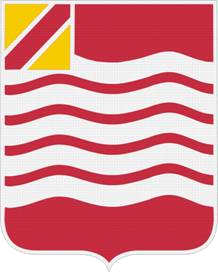
- Distinctive unit insignia

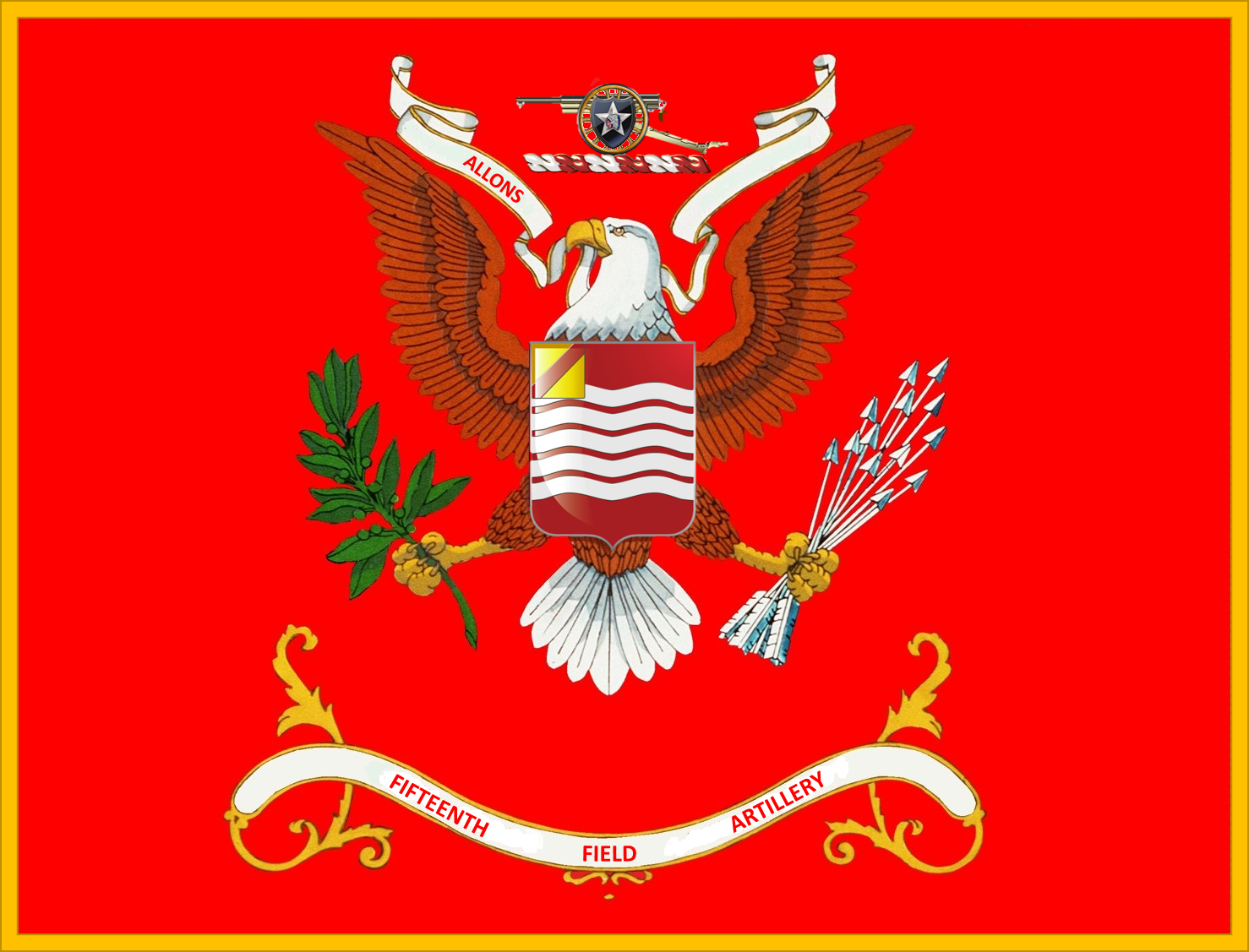
- Regimental colors

The 15th Field Artillery Regiment (FAR) is a field artillery regiment of the United States Army first formed in 1916. A parent regiment under the U.S. Army Regimental System, the 15th FAR currently has two active battalions: the 1st Battalion, 15th Field Artillery Regiment, is assigned to the 1st Brigade Combat Team, 2nd Infantry Division, while the 2nd Battalion, 15th Field Artillery Regiment, is assigned to the 2nd Brigade Combat Team, 10th Mountain Division.

== History ==
=== World War I ===
Warrant Officer Marcus L. Reik at the grave of Oliver B. Cunningham of the 15th Field Artillery Regiment, the first soldier to be buried in the St. Mihiel American Cemetery in France during World War I

The 15th Field Artillery (FA) Regiment was organized in Syracuse, New York, on 1 June 1917. Assignment to the 2nd Infantry Division (2nd ID) followed on 21 September 1917, and earned them the unofficial nickname as the Indianheads. The coat of arms of the 15th FA contains a French 75mm howitzer with the Indianhead of the 2nd ID patch incised in the wheel. The 15th FA participated in six major campaigns during World War I and helped win the "War to end all Wars".

=== Interwar period ===
The 15th Field Artillery arrived at the port of New York on 4 August 1919 on the troopship USS Julia Luckenbach and was transferred to Camp Mills, New York, where emergency period personnel were discharged from the service, and then to Camp Travis, San Antonio, Texas, on 16 August 1919. It was transferred in 1920 to nearby Fort Sam Houston, Texas. The regiment participated in the making of the films “The Rough Riders” and “Wings” at Camp Stanley, Texas, 27 September–23 October 1926. The regiment, less the 2nd Battalion, was inactivated on 31 October 1929 at Fort Sam Houston and allotted to the Eighth Corps Area. Concurrently, it was relieved from the 2nd Division and assigned to the 4th Division. It was relieved from the 4th Division on 1 January 1930 and reassigned to the 2nd Division. The regiment was reactivated on 1 December 1934 at Fort Sam Houston. Battery D was awarded the Knox Trophy for being the outstanding Regular Army field artillery battery for the year 1936. Assigned Organized Reserve officers conducted summer training with the regiment at Fort Sam Houston or Camp Bullis, Texas.

=== World War II ===
The 3rd Battalion was constituted on 27 September 1939 and activated on 7 October 1939 at Fort Sam Houston. Regiment reorganized and redesignated 15th Field Artillery Battalion on 1 October 1940 at Fort Sam Houston. A significant figure in the history of the regiment its Ralph McT. Pennell. The battalion subsequently served in five major campaigns in the European Theater of Operations with the 2nd Infantry Division during World War II.

=== Korean War ===
The 15th FA Battalion participated in ten major campaigns during the Korean War while once again serving with the 2nd ID. 1LT Lee R. Hartell was awarded the Medal of Honor (Posthumously) for heroic actions with the 15th FA Battalion during the Korean War, while serving as a forward observer. Also, MSG Jimmie Holloway earned the Distinguished Service Cross (posthumous) in a separate combat action.

=== Post-Korea ===
Major changes in the US Army in 1957, caused several redesignations to the 15th FA Bn: A Battery was redesignated as the 1st Howitzer (How) Bn, 15th Artillery (Arty); B Battery was redesignated as the 2nd How Bn, 15th Arty; C Battery as the 3rd How Bn, 15th Arty; D Battery as the 4th How Bn, 15th Arty; E Battery as the 5th How Bn, 15th Arty; F Battery as the 6th How Bn, 15th Arty; HHB as the 7th How Bn, 15th Arty, and HHB, 2nd Bn, 15th FA as the 8th Bn, 15th Arty.

=== Cold War – present ===
Both the 6th Bn, 15th Arty, and the 7th Bn, 15th Arty, were deployed to South Vietnam in 1967. The 6-15th served in nine major campaigns from May 1967 to November 1969, while the 7-15th served in 13 major campaigns from July 1967 to November 1971 throughout much of II Corps in places like Phu Cat, Pleiku, and An Khe, as well as various firebases throughout the Central Highlands. 2nd Lt Harold Bascom Durham Jr., a forward observer with Battery C, 6th Battalion, would be posthumously awarded the Medal of Honor for his actions during the Battle of Ong Thanh on 17 October 1967.

The 7-15th was inactivated after the Vietnam War, reactivated in the late 1980s to serve with the 7th Infantry Division, until it was once again inactivated. Prior to being made inactive, B Btry, 7th Bn, 15th Arty, were deployed to Panama in advance of Operation Just Cause. B Battery, 15th Field Artillery, was also activated at the same time as a separate battery as the 7th Infantry Division's general support battery, 8 X 155mm howitzers configured as two firing platoons. CPT Don Spiece commanded B Battery, 15th Field Artillery, from 1983 to 1985 as its first commander. B Battery, 15th Field Artillery, was inactivated at the same time as the 7-15th. The 1st Bn, 15th FA, served with the 2nd ID at Camp Casey, Korea, from 1988 to 2015, defending the Korean Demilitarized Zone (DMZ) separating North and South Korea.

OIF/OEF

Operation Iraqi Freedom, Operation Enduring Freedom The 2/15th Artillery deployed to Afghanistan along with other elements of the 10th Mountain Division in 2001 as part of Operation Enduring Freedom. In March 2003 the unit shifted its focus to Iraq as part of the 10th Mountain Division's contribution to Operation Iraqi Freedom.

In 2005 as part of the transformation of the entire 10th Mountain Division to the US Army's modular force structure the 2/15th Artillery was relieved from assignment on 17 September 2005 to the 10th Mountain Division and was reassigned to the 2nd Brigade Combat Team, 10th Mountain Division. The reorganized unit was redesignated as the 2nd Battalion, 15th Field Artillery Regiment, on 1 October 2005.

In 2006 the unit again deployed to Iraq with other elements of the transformed 2nd Brigade Combat Team, 10th Mountain Division. The 2/15th Field Artillery remained in that country until October 2007 when it returned to Fort Drum.

=== Lineage ===
Constituted 1 July 1916 in the Regular Army as the 15th Field Artillery

Organized 1 June 1917 at Syracuse, New York

Assigned 21 September 1917 to the 2d Division

Inactivated (less 2d Battalion) 31 October 1929 at Fort Sam Houston, Texas; concurrently, relieved from assignment to the 2d Division and assigned to the 4th Division

Relieved 1 January 1930 from assignment to the 4th Division and assigned to the 2d Division (later redesignated as the 2d Infantry Division)

Activated (less 2d Battalion) 1 December 1934 at Fort Sam Houston, Texas

Reorganized and redesignated 1 October 1940 as the 15th Field Artillery Battalion

Reorganized and redesignated 20 February 1956 as the 15th Armored Field Artillery Battalion

Relieved 20 June 1957 from assignment to the 2d Infantry Division; concurrently, reorganized and redesignated as the 15th Artillery, a parent regiment under the Combat Arms Regimental System

Redesignated 1 September 1971 as the 15th Field Artillery

Withdrawn 16 June 1988 from the Combat Arms Regimental System and reorganized under the United States Army Regimental System

Redesignated 1 October 2005 as the 15th Field Artillery Regiment

== Distinctive unit insignia ==
- Description

A Silver color metal and enamel device 1 1/16 inches (2.7 cm) in height consisting of a shield blazoned: Gules five closets wavy Argent, on a canton Or a bend sinister of the field.

- Symbolism

The regiment was organized in 1917 by transfer of men from the 4th Field Artillery. The old regiment is indicated by the canton. It was part of the Second Division overseas and took part in the heaviest of fighting. The extent of the operations is indicated by the five wavy bars on the shield representing the four historic French rivers, the Aisne, Marne, Meuse and finally the Rhine, which the regiment crossed.

- Background

The distinctive unit insignia was originally approved for the 15th Field Artillery Regiment on 14 September 1922. It was amended to correct the wear policy on 9 November 1926. It was further amended to correct the description on 9 November 1928. It was redesignated for the 15th Field Artillery Battalion on 20 October 1950. It was redesignated for the 15th Artillery Regiment on 10 February 1958. The insignia was redesignated effective 1 September 1971, for the 15th Field Artillery Regiment.

== Heraldic Coat of Arms (according to the Grant of Arms) ==
The Coat of Arms redesignated for the 15th Field Artillery Regiment by letter AG 424.5 Coats-of-Arms (Misc.) MC 258-4 (5-14-21_, The Office of the Adjutant General, 21 January 1922; then again redesignated for the 15th Field Artillery Battalion by letter QMGHB 424.2 – 15th F Bn, the Office of the Quartermaster General, 20 October 1950.

The Blazonry is as follows:

Shield (The body of the Regimental DUI)
"Gules five closets wavy argent, on a canton or a bend sinister of the field (and for unofficial use pendant to the shield a French Croix-de-Guerre with palm proper)."

Crest (The symbol affixed above the shield)
"On a wreath of the colors, a French 75mm Fieldgun the wheel charged with the shoulder insignia of the regiment (a vertical black oblong with the white star and Indian head of the Second Division) all Proper."

The crest symbolizes the regiment's service in World War I as an artillery unit known as the "Indianheads of the Fighting Fifteenth" in the Second Division later known as the 2nd Infantry Division.

Motto
"Allons"

The description given in the original approval cited in paragraph 1a is as follows:

The regiment was organized in 1917 by transfer of men from the 4th Field Artillery. The old regiment is indicated by the canton. It was part of the Second Division overseas and took part in the heaviest of fighting. The extent of the Operations is indicated by the five wavy bars on the shield representing the four historic French rivers, the Aisne, Marne, Meuse, and Moselle and finally the Rhine which the regiment crossed. The significance of the crest and motto are evident.

== Current configuration ==
Most of the eight battalions of the 15th Field Artillery originated from the 1st and 2nd Battalions. Below are their current status and origin.

- 1st Battalion, 15th Field Artillery Regiment (1-15th FAR) - inactive since July 2015; assigned to the 1st Brigade Combat Team, 2nd Infantry Division
- 2nd Battalion, 15th Field Artillery Regiment (2-15th FAR) - active; assigned to the 2nd Brigade Combat Team, 10th Mountain Division
- 3rd Battalion, 15th Field Artillery Regiment (3-15th FAR) - inactive since 15 September 1994, originated as C Battery, 1st Battalion, 15th Field Artillery
- 4th Battalion, 15th Field Artillery Regiment (4-15th FAR) - inactive since 31 December 1965, originated as D Battery, 2nd Battalion, 15th Field Artillery
- 5th Battalion, 15th Field Artillery Regiment (5-15th FAR) - inactive since 15 July 1990, originated as E Battery, 2nd Battalion, 15th Field Artillery
- 6th Battalion, 15th Field Artillery Regiment (6-15th FAR) - inactive since 22 November 1969, originated as F Battery, 2nd Battalion, 15th Field Artillery
- 7th Battalion, 15th Field Artillery Regiment (7-15th FAR) - inactive since 15 September 1993, originated as HHD, 1st Battalion, 15th Field Artillery
- 8th Battalion, 15th Field Artillery Regiment (8-15th FAR) - inactive since 1 September 1971, originated as HHD, 2nd Battalion, 15th Field Artillery

== Campaign participation credit ==
World War I: Aisne; Aisne-Marne; St. Mihiel; Meuse-Argonne; Lorraine 1918; Ile de France 1918

World War II: Normandy; Northern France; Rhineland; Ardennes-Alsace; Central Europe

Korean War: UN Defensive; UN Offensive; CCF Intervention; First UN Counteroffensive; CCF Spring Offensive; UN Summer-Fall Offensive; Second Korean Winter; Korea, Summer-Fall 1952; Third Korean Winter; Korea, Summer 1953

Vietnam: Counteroffensive, Phase II; Counteroffensive, Phase III; Tet Counteroffensive; Counteroffensive, Phase IV; Counteroffensive, Phase V; Counteroffensive, Phase VI; Tet 69/Counteroffensive; Summer-Fall 1969; Winter-Spring 1970; Sanctuary Counteroffensive; Counteroffensive, Phase VII; Consolidation I; Consolidation II; Cease-Fire

War on Terrorism: Campaigns to be determined

== Unit decorations ==
- WORLD WAR I
  - World War I Victory, Streamer embroidered AISNE (27 May–5 June 1918)
  - World War I Victory, Streamer embroidered AISNE–MARNE (18 July–6 August 1918)
  - World War I Victory, Streamer embroidered MEUSE–ARGONNE (26 September–11 November 1918)
  - French Croix de Guerre with Palm, World War I, Streamer embroidered AISNE–MARNE
  - French Croix de Guerre with Palm, World War I, Streamer embroidered MEUSE–ARGONNE
  - French Croix de Guerre, World War I, Fourragere
- WORLD WAR II
  - European–African–Middle Eastern Theater, Streamer embroidered NORMANDY (6 June–24 July 1944)
  - European–African–Middle Eastern Theater, Streamer embroidered NORTHERN FRANCE (25 July–14 September 1944)
  - European–African–Middle Eastern Theater, Streamer embroidered RHINELAND (15 September 1944 – 21 March 1945)
  - European–African–Middle Eastern Theater, Streamer embroidered ARDENNES–ALSACE (16 December 1944 – 25 January 1945)
  - European–African–Middle Eastern Theater, Streamer embroidered CENTRAL EUROPE (22 March–11 May 1945)
  - Belgian Fourragere 1940
  - Cited in the Order of the Day of the Belgian Army for action in the Ardennes
  - Cited in the Order of the Day of the Belgian Army for action at Elsenborn Crest
- KOREAN WAR
  - Presidential Unit Citation (ARMY), Streamer embroidered HONGCHON
  - Republic of Korea Presidential Unit Citation, Streamer embroidered NAKTONG RIVER LINE
  - Republic of Korea Presidential Unit Citation, Streamer embroidered KOREA (1950–1953)
  - UN Defensive, Streamer embroidered UN DEFENSIVE (27 June–15 September 1950)
  - UN Offensive, Streamer embroidered UN OFFENSIVE (16 September–2 November 1950)
  - CCF Intervention, Streamer embroidered CCF INTERVENTION (3 November 1950 – 24 January 1951)
  - First UN Counteroffensive, Streamer embroidered FIRST UN COUNTEROFFENSIVE (25 January–21 April 1951)
  - CCF Spring Offensive, Streamer embroidered CCF SPRING OFFENSIVE (22 April–8 July 1951)
  - UN Summer–Fall Offensive, Streamer embroidered UN SUMMER–FALL OFFENSIVE (9 July–27 November 1951)
  - Second Korean Winter, Streamer embroidered SECOND KOREAN WINTER (28 November 1951 – 30 April 1952)
  - Korea, Summer–Fall, Streamer embroidered KOREA, SUMMER–FALL (1952 1 May–30 November 1952)
  - Third Korean Winter, Streamer embroidered THIRD KOREAN WINTER (1 December 1952 – 30 April 1953)
  - Korea, Summer 1953, Streamer embroidered KOREA, SUMMER 1953 (1 May–27 July 1953)
- CUBAN MISSILE CRISIS–8th Battalion, 15th Field Artillery (inactivated)
  - Meritorious Unit Commendation (ARMY), Streamer embroidered FLORIDA 1962–1963
- VIETNAM WAR–15TH Field Artillery Regiment
  - Counteroffensive, Phase II, Streamer embroidered COUNTEROFFENSIVE, PHASE II (1 July 1966 – 31 May 1967)
  - Counteroffensive, Phase III, Streamer embroidered COUNTEROFFENSIVE, PHASE III (1 June 1967 – 29 January 1968_
  - Tet Counteroffensive, Streamer embroidered TET COUNTEROFFENSIVE (30 January–1 April 1968)
  - Counteroffensive, Phase IV, Streamer embroidered COUNTEROFFENSIVE, PHASE IV (2 April–30 June 1968)
  - Counteroffensive, Phase V, Streamer embroidered COUNTEROFFENSIVE, PHASE V (1 July–1 November 1968)
  - Counteroffensive, Phase VI, Streamer embroidered COUNTEROFFENSIVE, PHASE VI (2 November 1968 – 22 February 1969)
  - Tet 69 Counteroffensive, Streamer embroidered TET 69 COUNTEROFFENSIVE (23 February–8 June 1969)
  - Summer–Fall 1969, Streamer embroidered SUMMER–FALL 1969 (9 June–31 October 1969)
  - Winter–Spring 1970, Streamer embroidered WINTER–SPRING 1970 (1 November 1969 – 30 April 1970)
- VIETNAM WAR–6th Battalion, 15th Field Artillery (inactivated)
  - Republic of Vietnam Civil Actions Honor Medal, Streamer embroidered VIETNAM 1967–1968
  - Republic of Vietnam Civil Actions Honor Medal, Streamer embroidered VIETNAM 1968–1969
  - Republic of Vietnam Gallantry Cross with Palm, Streamer embroidered VIETNAM 1967–1968
  - Meritorious Unit Commendation (ARMY), Streamer embroidered VIETNAM 1968–1969
  - Valorous Unit Award (ARMY), Streamer embroidered CAMP KATUM (citation awarded to C Battery, 6th BN, 15th FA)
- VIETNAM WAR–7th Battalion, 15th Field Artillery (inactivated)
  - Republic of Vietnam Gallantry Cross with Palm, Streamer embroidered VIETNAM 1967–1971
  - Award of Certificate by Army Level from the Joint Chief of Staff (Army of the Republic of Viet Nam–ARVN) A Battery, 7th BN, 15th FA
- OPERATION IRAQI FREEDOM–2nd Battalion, 15th Field Artillery (Active)
  - Valorous Unit Award (ARMY), Streamer embroidered OEF 2002 (HHB (-) Fire Support Team)
  - Meritorious Unit Commendation (ARMY), Streamer embroidered IRAQ 2004–2005
  - Valorous Unit Award (ARMY), Streamer embroidered MAHMUDIYAH, IRAQ 2006–2007
  - Meritorious Unit Citation (ARMY), Streamer embroidered IRAQ 2009–2010
