= Harold Bascom Durham Jr. =

United States Army officer

- The Army Medal of Honor
- Born: October 12, 1942; Rocky Mount, North Carolina, US
- Died: October 17, 1967 (aged 25); Chơn Thành District, Bình Dương Province, South Vietnam
- Military career
- Allegiance: United States
- Branch: United States Army
- Service years: 1964–1967
- Rank: Second Lieutenant
- Units: Battery C, 6th Battalion, 15th Artillery Regiment, 1st Infantry Division
- Conflicts: Vietnam War: Battle of Ong Thanh †
- Awards: Medal of Honor; Bronze Star (2); Purple Heart

Harold Bascom Durham Jr. (October 12, 1942 – October 17, 1967) was a United States Army officer and a recipient of the United States military's highest decoration—the Medal of Honor—for his actions in the Vietnam War.

== Biography ==
Durham joined the Army from Atlanta, Georgia in 1964, and by October 17, 1967 was serving as a second lieutenant in Battery C, 6th Battalion, 15th Artillery Regiment, 1st Infantry Division. During the Battle of Ong Thanh, Durham repeatedly exposed himself to hostile fire in order to direct artillery fire despite severe wounds. He was killed during the battle and posthumously awarded the Medal of Honor for his actions.

== Medal of Honor citation ==
Second Lieutenant Durham's official Medal of Honor citation reads:

2d Lt. Durham, Artillery, distinguished himself by conspicuous gallantry and intrepidity at the cost of his life above and beyond the call of duty while assigned to Battery C. 2d Lt. Durham was serving as a forward observer with Company D, 2d Battalion, 28th Infantry during a battalion reconnaissance-in-force mission. At approximately 1015 hours contact was made with an enemy force concealed in well-camouflaged positions and fortified bunkers. 2d Lt. Durham immediately moved into an exposed position to adjust the supporting artillery fire onto the insurgents. During a brief lull in the battle he administered emergency first aid to the wounded in spite of heavy enemy sniper fire directed toward him. Moments later, as enemy units assaulted friendly positions, he learned that Company A, bearing the brunt of the attack, had lost its forward observer. While he was moving to replace the wounded observer, the enemy detonated a Claymore mine, severely wounding him in the head and impairing his vision. In spite of the intense pain, he continued to direct the supporting artillery fire and to employ his individual weapon in support of the hard pressed infantrymen. As the enemy pressed their attack, 2d Lt. Durham called for supporting fire to be placed almost directly on his position. Twice the insurgents were driven back, leaving many dead and wounded behind. 2d Lt. Durham was then taken to a secondary defensive position. Even in his extremely weakened condition, he continued to call artillery fire onto the enemy. He refused to seek cover and instead positioned himself in a small clearing which offered a better vantage point from which to adjust the fire. Suddenly, he was severely wounded a second time by enemy machine gun fire. As he lay on the ground near death, he saw two Viet Cong approaching, shooting the defenseless wounded men. With his last effort, 2d Lt. Durham shouted a warning to a nearby soldier who immediately killed the insurgents. 2d Lt. Durham died moments later, still grasping the radio handset. 2d Lt. Durham's gallant actions in close combat with an enemy force are in keeping with the highest traditions of the military service and reflect great credit upon himself, his unit, and the U.S. Army.

== Awards and decorations ==
According to US Army records, Durham was the recipient of the following awards;

| 1st row | | Medal of Honor | |
| 2nd row | Bronze Star Medal (Two awards, one with "V" for valor) | Purple Heart | Army Commendation Medal |
| 3rd row | Army Good Conduct Medal | National Defense Service Medal | Vietnam Service Medal |
| 4th row | National Order of Vietnam | Gallantry Cross (South Vietnam) Vietnam Gallantry Cross w/ Palm | Vietnam Campaign Medal |

== See also ==
- List of Medal of Honor recipients for the Vietnam War
