= Lee R. Hartell =

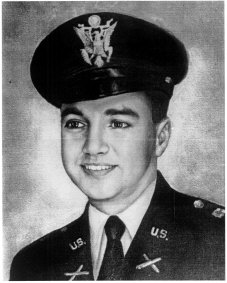
- Born: August 23, 1923; Philadelphia, Pennsylvania, US
- Died: August 27, 1951 (aged 28); Yanggu County, Gangwon, Korea
- Burial place: St. Peter's Cemetery, Danbury, Connecticut
- Military career
- Allegiance: United States
- Branch: Connecticut National Guard; United States Army
- Service years: 1940–1945; 1946–1951
- Rank: First lieutenant
- Units: Battery A, 15th Field Artillery Battalion, 2nd Infantry Division
- Conflicts: World War II: Pacific War (WIA); Korean War: Battle of Bloody Ridge (DOW)
- Awards: Medal of Honor; Purple Heart (2)

Lee Ross Hartell (August 23, 1923 – August 27, 1951) was a soldier in the United States Army during the Korean War who was posthumously awarded the Medal of Honor for his actions on August 27, 1951, during the Battle of Bloody Ridge. He joined the army from Danbury, Connecticut, in 1949.

By August 26, 1951, Hartell was on the ground as a forward observer with B Company, 9th Infantry Regiment at the base of Hill 700 near Kobanson-ni. Hill 700 was attacked and taken by B Company that day. But the Chinese mounted a major counterattack at 04:00. Hartell walked the artillery fire right up the hill on top of the charging enemy. Although wounded, he kept calling in artillery fire onto his hilltop. Finally at 06:30 hours, Hartell was hit in the chest by a bullet and died.

== Military service ==
Lee enlisted in the Connecticut National Guard on June 20, 1940, in the 192nd Field Artillery Battalion. He transferred to active duty on September 22, 1942, and was wounded in action in the South Pacific on June 19, 1943. He then transferred to Battery C of the 31st Battalion, 8th Field Artillery training regiment at Fort Sill, Oklahoma, and was discharged from active duty on July 1, 1945. He was discharged from the Connecticut National Guard the following day.

On August 8, 1946, he rejoined the Connecticut National Guard as a second lieutenant and served as an artillery officer with the 963rd Field Artillery battalion. He was then discharged from the National Guard on January 12, 1948, to enter active duty service. He was deployed to Korea as part of Battery A, 15th Artillery Battalion of the 2nd Infantry Division. He was killed in action on August 27, 1951.

== Medal of Honor citation ==
Rank and organization: First Lieutenant, U.S. Army, Battery A, 15th Field Artillery Battalion, 2d Infantry Division

Place and date: Near Kobangsan-ni, Korea, August 27, 1951

Entered service at: Danbury, Conn. Birth: Philadelphia, Pennsylvania

G.O. No.: 16, February 1, 1952.

Citation:

1st. Lt. Hartell, a member of Battery A, distinguished himself by conspicuous gallantry and intrepidity at the risk of his life above and beyond the call of duty in action against an armed enemy of the United Nations. During the darkness of early morning, the enemy launched a ruthless attack against friendly positions on a rugged mountainous ridge. 1st Lt. Hartell, attached to Company B, 9th Infantry Regiment, as forward observer, quickly moved his radio to an exposed vantage on the ridge line to adjust defensive fires. Realizing the tactical advantage of illuminating the area of approach, he called for flares and then directed crippling fire into the onrushing assailants. At this juncture a large force of hostile troops swarmed up the slope in banzai charge and came within 10 yards of 1st Lt. Hartell's position. 1st Lt. Hartell sustained a severe hand wound in the ensuing encounter but grasped the microphone with his other hand and maintained his magnificent stand until the front and left flank of the company were protected by a close-in wall of withering fire, causing the fanatical foe to disperse and fall back momentarily. After the numerically superior enemy overran an outpost and was closing on his position, 1st Lt. Hartell, in a final radio call, urged the friendly elements to fire both batteries continuously. Although mortally wounded, 1st Lt. Hartell's intrepid actions contributed significantly to stemming the onslaught and enabled his company to maintain the strategic strongpoint. His consummate valor and unwavering devotion to duty reflect lasting glory on himself and uphold the noble traditions of the military service.

== Awards and Decorations ==

Badge	Combat Infantryman Badge		
1st row	Medal of Honor		Purple Heart with 1 Oak leaf cluster
2nd row	Army Good Conduct Medal	American Defense Service Medal	American Campaign Medal
3rd row	Asiatic-Pacific Campaign Medal with 3 Campaign stars	World War II Victory Medal	National Defense Service Medal
3rd row	Korean Service Medal with 4 Campaign stars	United Nations Service Medal Korea	Korean War Service Medal Retroactively Awarded, 2003
Unit awards	Presidential Unit Citation		Korean Presidential Unit Citation

== Legacy ==
One of the main roads at Fort Sill, Oklahoma, was renamed Hartell Boulevard in his honor. The Connecticut Army National Guard has named its training installation in Windsor Locks Camp Hartell in his honor. Camp Hartell, at one time the location of the 1st Battalion, 79th Artillery (1960–1971), 7th Infantry Division, Munsan-ni, Korea, was also named in his honor. He had been a resident of Danbury and Lee Hartell Drive in Danbury was posthumously named in his honor. The "Hartell House" is a general officers mess named in his honor which has proudly served the Commanding Generals of United Nations Command, ROK/US Combined Forces Command, United States Forces Korea, and Eighth U.S. Army. He is commemorated by a memorial on the front lawn of the Danbury War Memorial building at the corner of South Street and Memorial Drive. Lee Hartell Chapter 25 of the Disabled American Veterans in Danbury is named for him. He was laid to rest at St. Peter's Cemetery in Danbury.

== See also ==
- List of Korean War Medal of Honor recipients
