= Fort Sill National Cemetery =

Veterans cemetery in Comanche County, Oklahoma

- Interactive map of Fort Sill National Cemetery

Details
- Established: 2001
- Location: Elgin, Oklahoma
- Country: United States
- Coordinates: 34°45′50″N 98°20′51″W
- Type: United States National Cemetery
- Size: 391.3 acres (158.4 ha)
- No. of graves: 8,000+
- Website: Fort Sill National Cemetery
- Find a Grave: Fort Sill National Cemetery

Fort Sill National Cemetery is a United States National Cemetery located in the city of Elgin in Comanche County, Oklahoma. Administered by the United States Department of Veterans Affairs, it encompasses 391.3 acres (158.4 ha), and as of 2021 had more than 8,000 interments.

== History ==
Fort Sill was established in 1869, in what was then Indian territory, by Major General Philip H. Sheridan, and named in honor of Brigadier General Joshua W. Sill, who died at the Battle of Stones River. The area around Fort Sill served as a reservation for displaced Native American groups. Apache Chief Geronimo lived the last days of his life, and died at Fort Sill, as did Kiowa Chief Kicking Bird.

Fort Sill National Cemetery was dedicated on November 2, 2001; it was the second National Cemetery built in the state of Oklahoma. The first stage of development of the cemetery finished in 2003. It is an expansion to the smaller 9-acre burial area located about ten miles south at Fort Sill. The Fort Sill Post Cemetery has had 7,140 interments since 1869.
