= Robinsons Landing Marina =

Marina in Oklahoma, United States

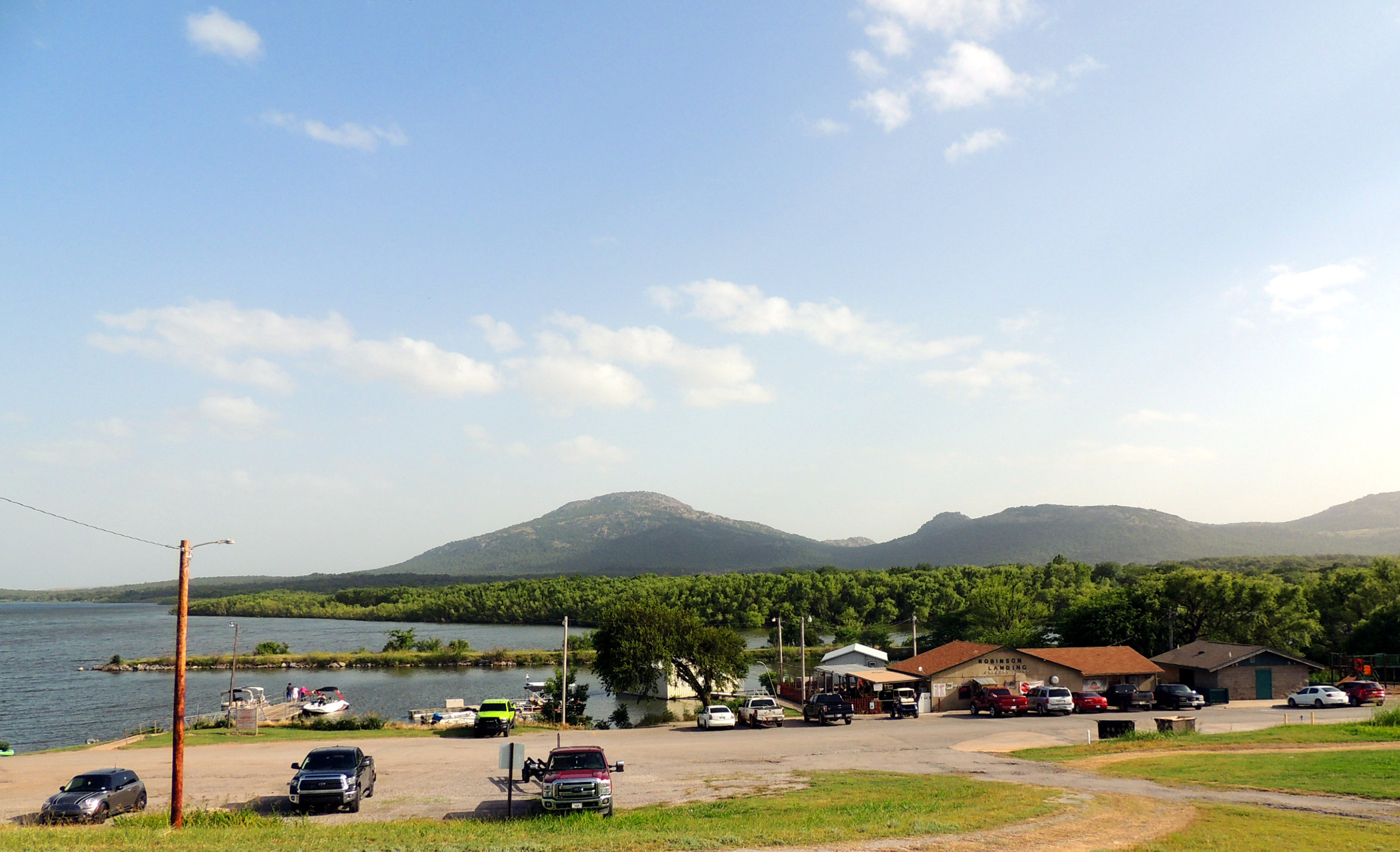
- Robinsons Landing Marina in Oklahoma

- Location within Oklahoma Location within the United States
- Location: Comanche County, Oklahoma
- Coordinates: 34°46′37″N 98°31′49″W
- Type: Boathouse Docks; Lake Marina; Watercraft Launch
- Part of: Lake Lawtonka
- Primary inflows: Medicine Creek
- Primary outflows: Medicine Creek
- Managing agency: City of Lawton
- Built: 1905
- Surface elevation: 1,348 ft (411 m)
- Settlements: Medicine Park; Meers
- Website: Robinson's Landing Marina

Robinsons Landing Marina is located in Comanche County, Oklahoma within the continental United States. Lake Lawtonka provides the fresh water source for the waterfront marina. The watercraft landing basin is situated on the north shoreline boundaries of the Lawtonka reservoir.

The public marina borders the Wichita Mountains and Wichita Mountains Wildlife Refuge with the lofty neighbor of Mount Scott in the distance. The lake marina has a census-designated place or housing estate bearing north known as Lawtonka Acres.

The Lawtonka recreation area and north shore marina are public property of the City of Lawton Lakes Division.

== Gallery ==
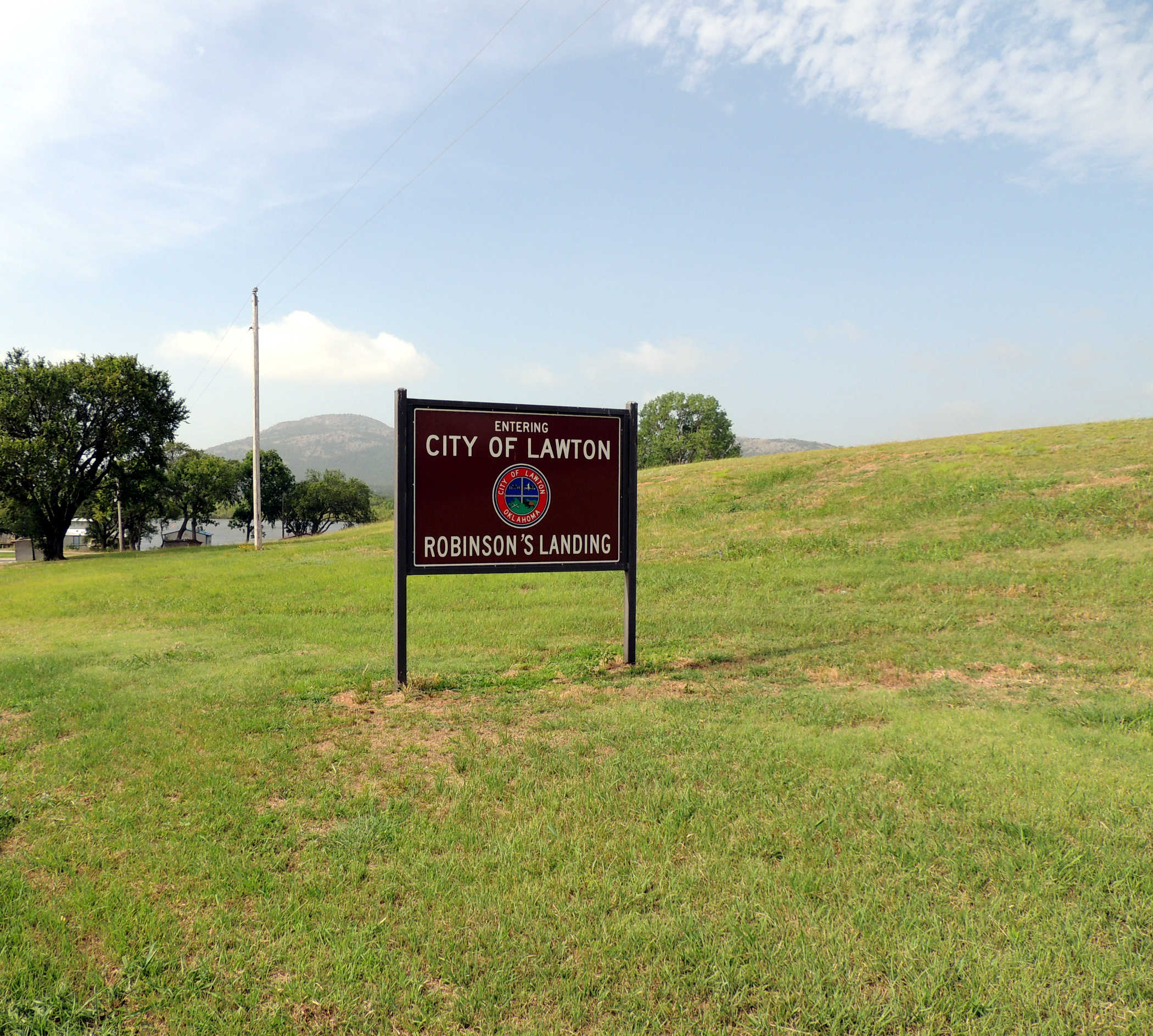
Robinsons Landing managed by City of Lawton

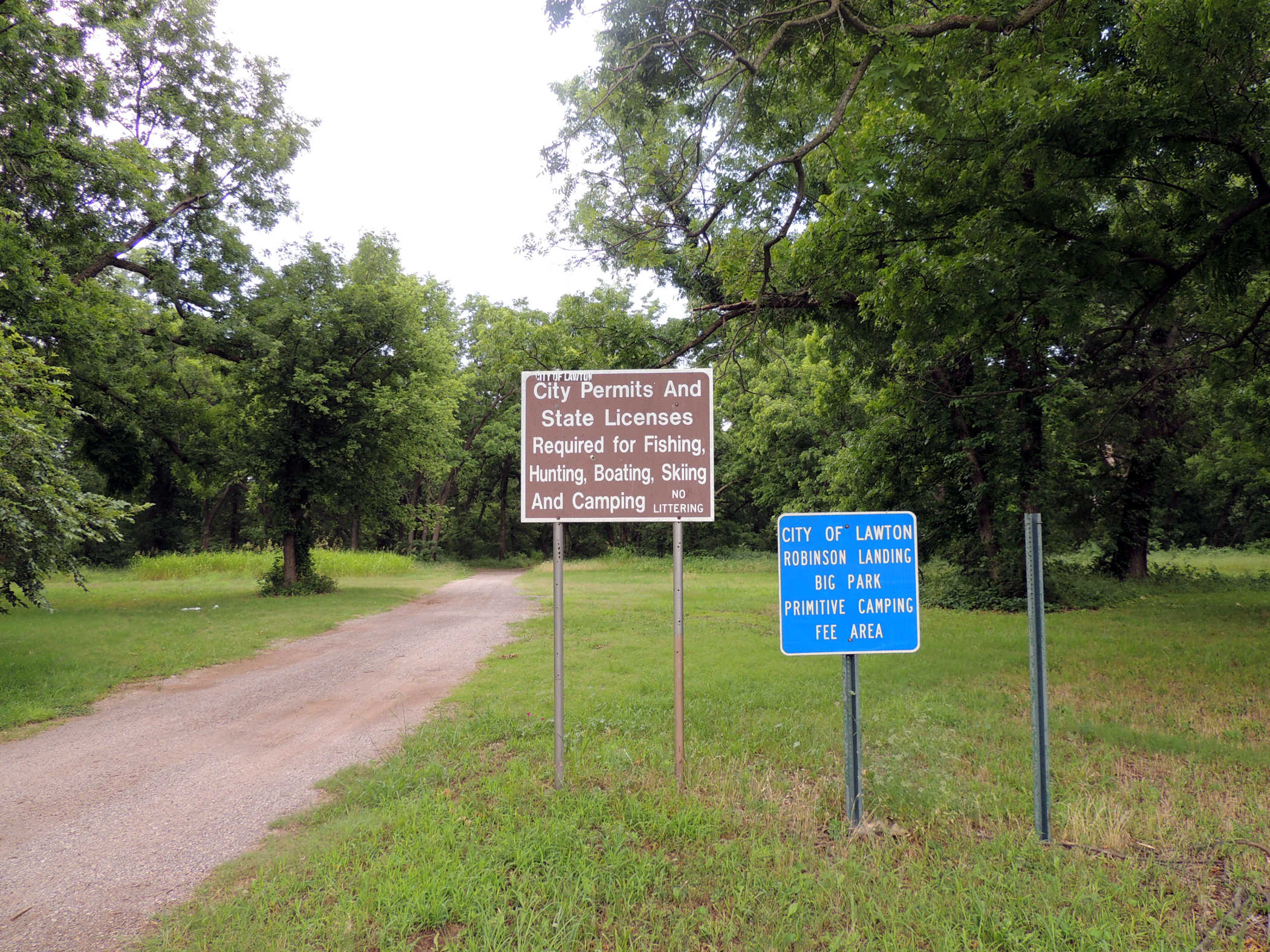
Primitive camping at Robinsons Landing Park

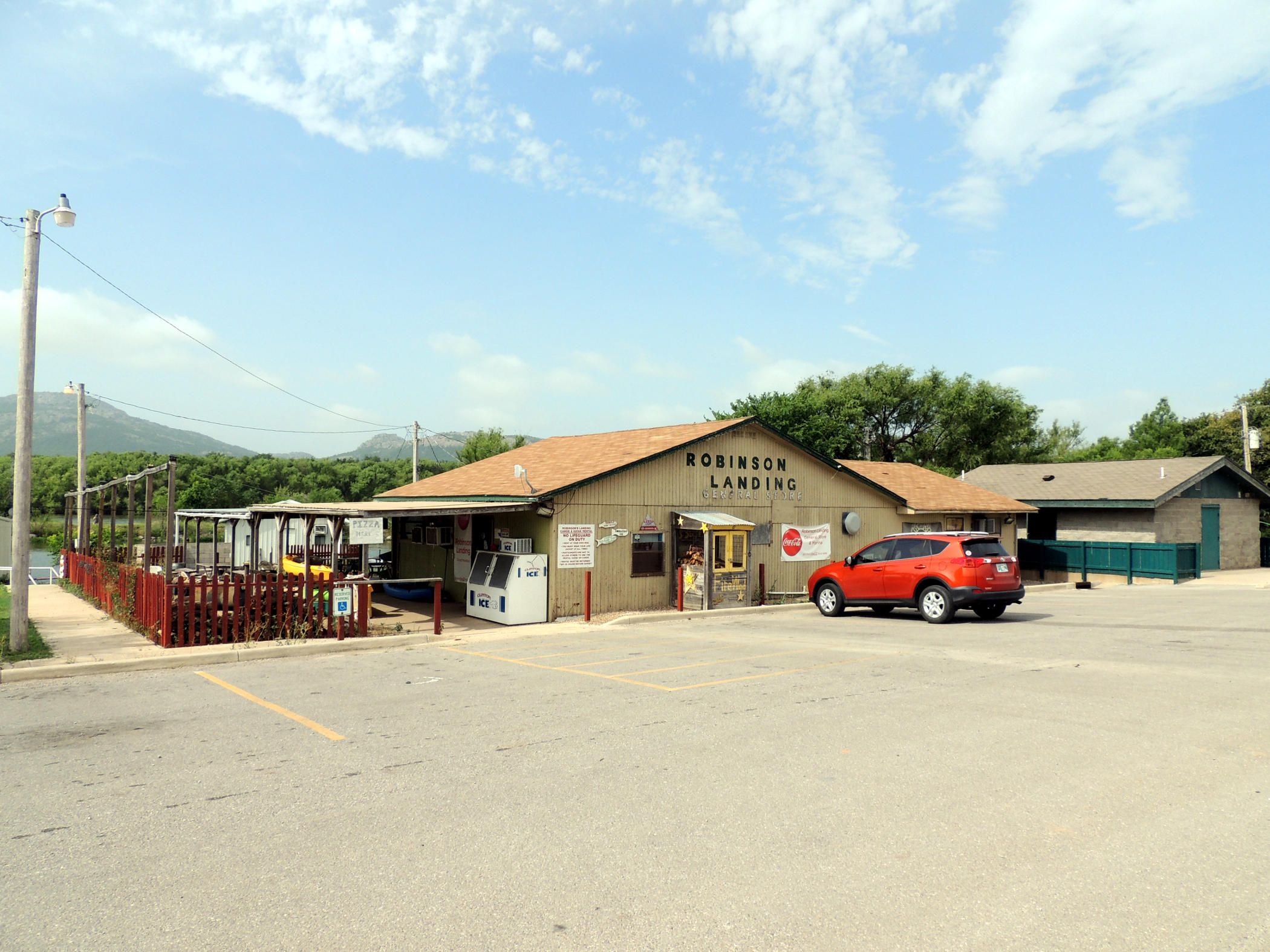
General store and recreational permits information at Robinsons Landing Marina

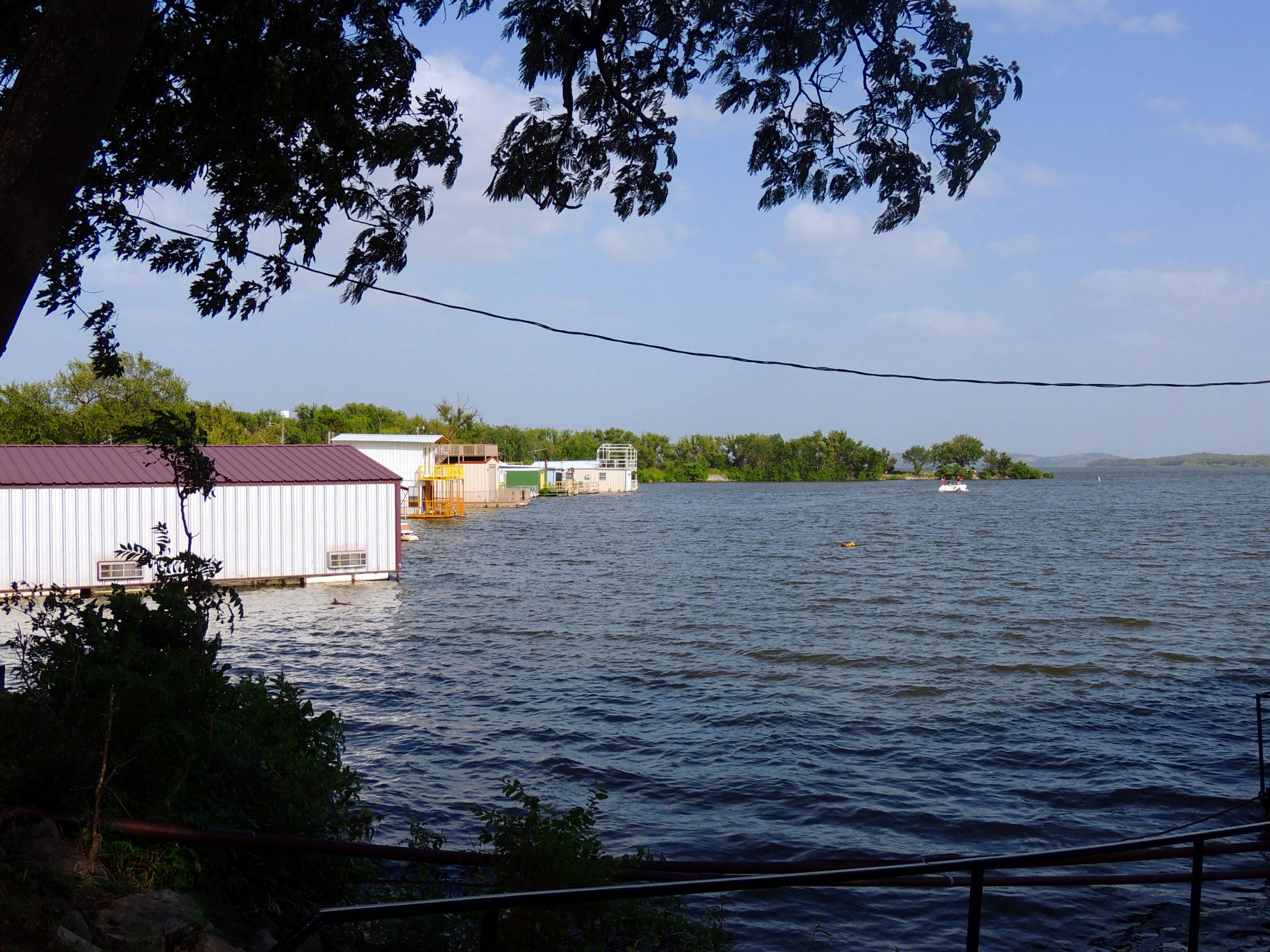
Boathouses at Robinsons Landing Marina

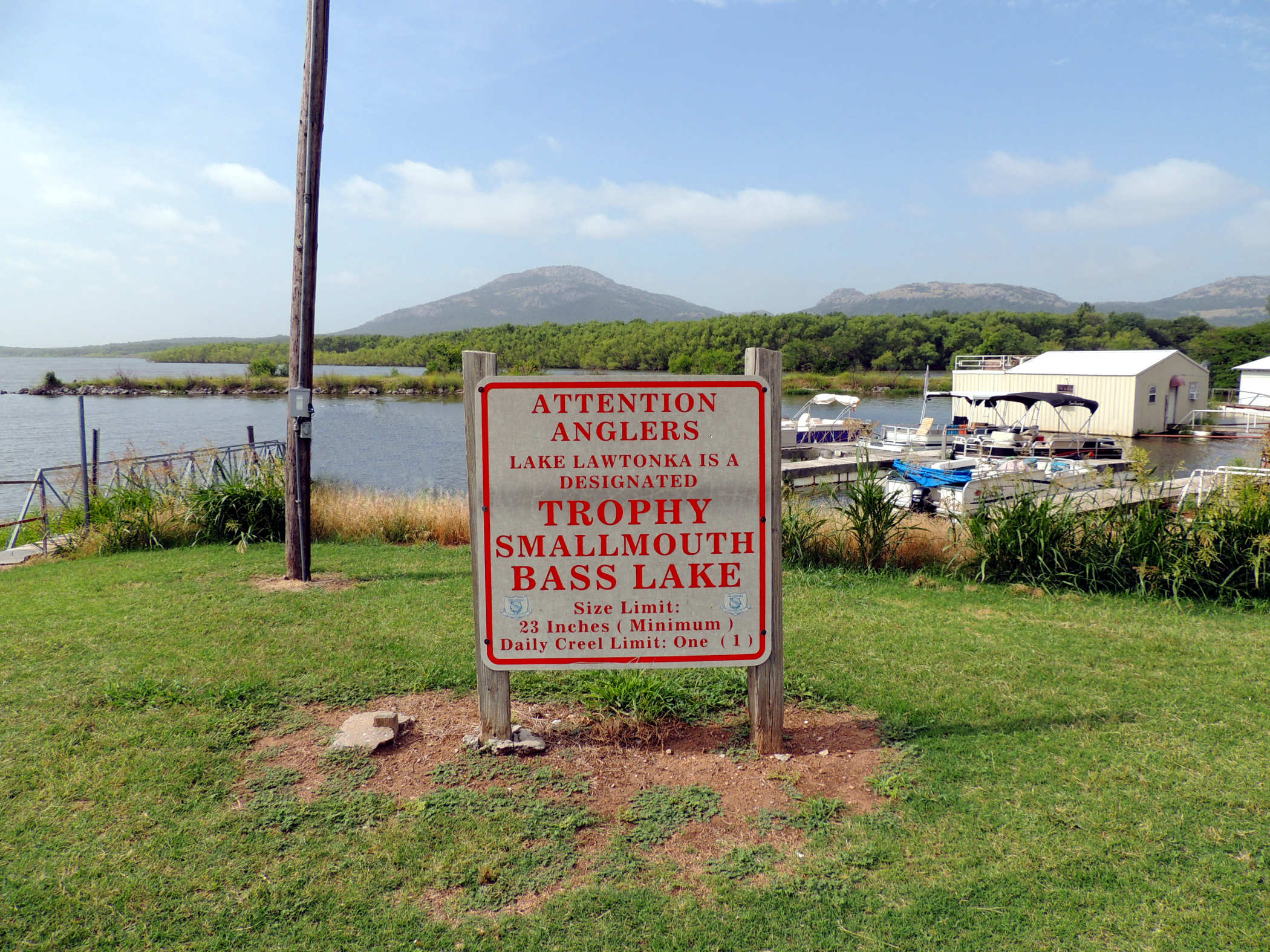
Fishing regulations for Lake Lawtonka

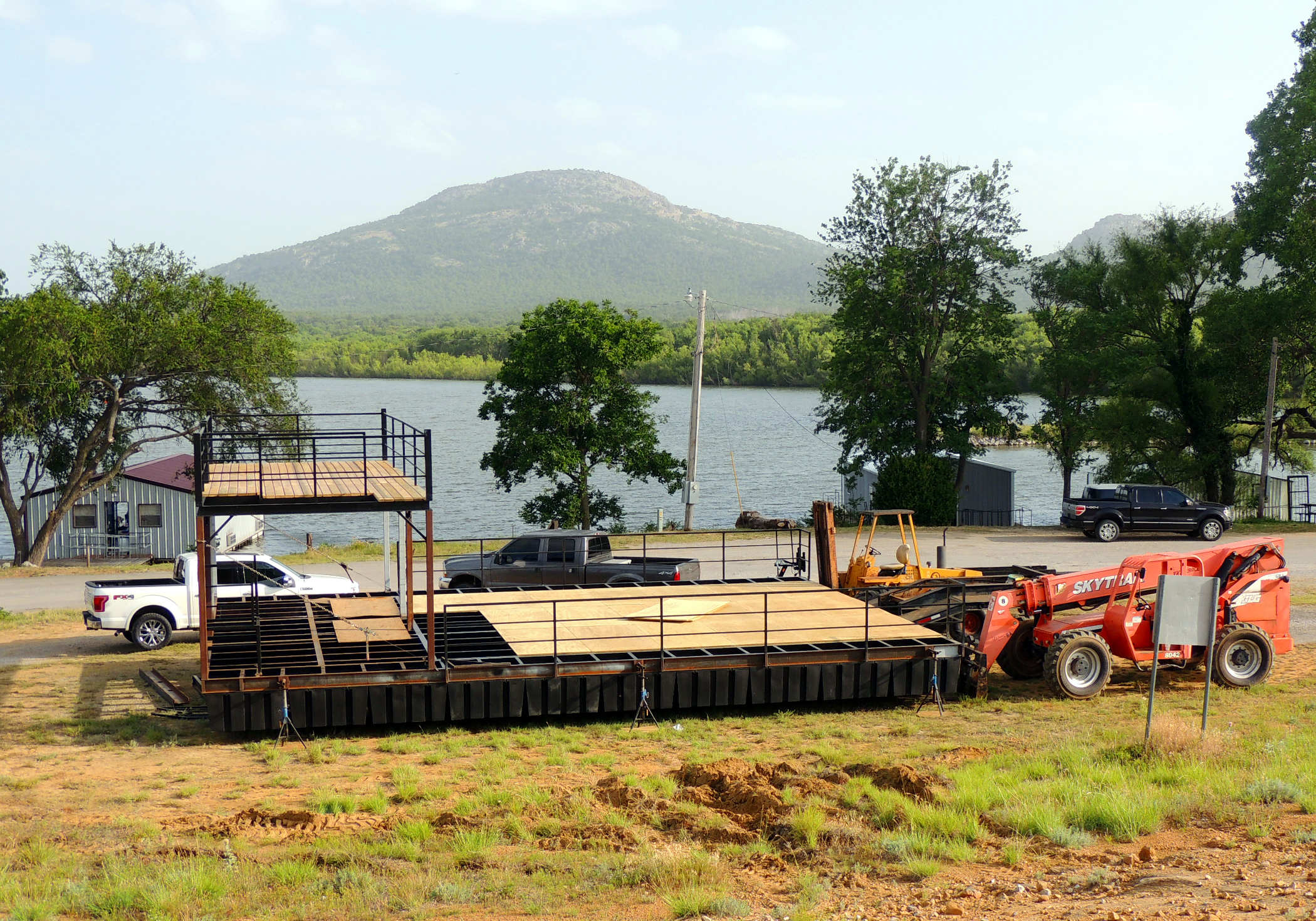
Marina boathouse construction with pictorial of Mountain Scott

== Climate ==
According to the Köppen climate classification system, Wichita Mountains region has a humid subtropical climate, with a climate map reference as Cfa.

Climate data for Wichita Mountain WLR, OK US (1981-2010)
Month	Jan	Feb	Mar	Apr	May	Jun	Jul	Aug	Sep	Oct	Nov	Dec	Year
Mean daily maximum °F (°C)	50.8 (10.4)	54.5 (12.5)	63.4 (17.4)	72.6 (22.6)	80.3 (26.8)	88.2 (31.2)	94.1 (34.5)	93.9 (34.4)	85.2 (29.6)	74.2 (23.4)	62 (17)	50.9 (10.5)	72.5 (22.5)
Mean daily minimum °F (°C)	28.2 (−2.1)	32 (0)	40.5 (4.7)	48.9 (9.4)	59.1 (15.1)	67.4 (19.7)	71.9 (22.2)	70.6 (21.4)	62 (17)	50.7 (10.4)	39.8 (4.3)	29.5 (−1.4)	50.1 (10.1)
Average precipitation inches (mm)	1.68 (43)	1.81 (46)	2.89 (73)	2.86 (73)	4.7 (120)	4.5 (110)	2.85 (72)	3.10 (79)	3.80 (97)	3.75 (95)	2.23 (57)	1.73 (44)	35.9 (909)
Source: NOAA National Climatic Data Center

== See also ==
- Cache Creek
- Charon Gardens Wilderness Area
- Elmer Thomas Lake
- Ketch Ranch House
- Lake Jed Johnson
- Mount Pinchot
- Quanah Parker Lake

== Reading Bibliography ==
- Ellenbrook, Edward Charles (1988). "Endless Encounters: A Map and Recreational Guide to the Wichita Mountains". In-The-Valley-of-the-Wichitas House. ISBN 978-0941634038. OCLC 18642411.
- Lott, David C. (June 14, 2010). "Medicine Park : Oklahoma's First Resort (Images of America)". Arcadia Publishing. ISBN 978-0738577456. OCLC 646185401.
