= Lawtonka Acres, Oklahoma =

Unincorporated community in Oklahoma, US

- Census-designated place
- Location within Oklahoma Location within the United States
- Coordinates: 34°46′44″N 98°31′50″W
- Country: United States
- State: Oklahoma
- County: Comanche

Area
  - Total: 0.32 sq mi (0.84 km^{2})
  - Land: 0.25 sq mi (0.64 km^{2})
  - Water: 0.077 sq mi (0.20 km^{2})
- Elevation: 1,365 ft (416 m)

Population (2020)
  - Total: 187
  - Density: 752.7/sq mi (290.62/km^{2})
- Time zone: UTC-6 (Central (CST))
  - Summer (DST): UTC-5 (CDT)
- ZIP Code: 73507 (Lawton)
- Area code: 580
- FIPS code: 40-41856
- GNIS feature ID: 2812849

Lawtonka Acres is a census-designated place (CDP) in Comanche County, Oklahoma, United States. As of the 2020 census, Lawtonka Acres had a population of 187. It was first listed as a CDP prior to the 2020 census.

The CDP is in northern Comanche County, at the north end of Lake Lawtonka, an impoundment on Medicine Creek, a southeast-flowing tributary of East Cache Creek, leading south to the Red River. It is 18 miles (29 km) northwest of Lawton and less than 2 miles (3 km) north of the Wichita Mountains.

== Demographics ==
Historical population
Census	Pop.	Note	%±
2020	187		—
U.S. Decennial Census

=== 2020 census ===
As of the 2020 census, Lawtonka Acres had a population of 187. The median age was 42.6 years. 20.9% of residents were under the age of 18 and 10.2% of residents were 65 years of age or older. For every 100 females there were 98.9 males, and for every 100 females age 18 and over there were 111.4 males age 18 and over.

0.0% of residents lived in urban areas, while 100.0% lived in rural areas.

There were 84 households in Lawtonka Acres, of which 20.2% had children under the age of 18 living in them. Of all households, 38.1% were married-couple households, 25.0% were households with a male householder and no spouse or partner present, and 25.0% were households with a female householder and no spouse or partner present. About 33.3% of all households were made up of individuals and 7.2% had someone living alone who was 65 years of age or older.

There were 111 housing units, of which 24.3% were vacant. The homeowner vacancy rate was 8.8% and the rental vacancy rate was 0.0%.

Racial composition as of the 2020 census
Race	Number	Percent
White	135	72.2%
Black or African American	0	0.0%
American Indian and Alaska Native	23	12.3%
Asian	1	0.5%
Native Hawaiian and Other Pacific Islander	2	1.1%
Some other race	1	0.5%
Two or more races	25	13.4%
Hispanic or Latino (of any race)	5	2.7%

== Education ==
The school district is Elgin Public Schools. Its comprehensive high school is Elgin High School.

== See also ==
Robinsons Landing Marina
