= Lake Lawtonka =

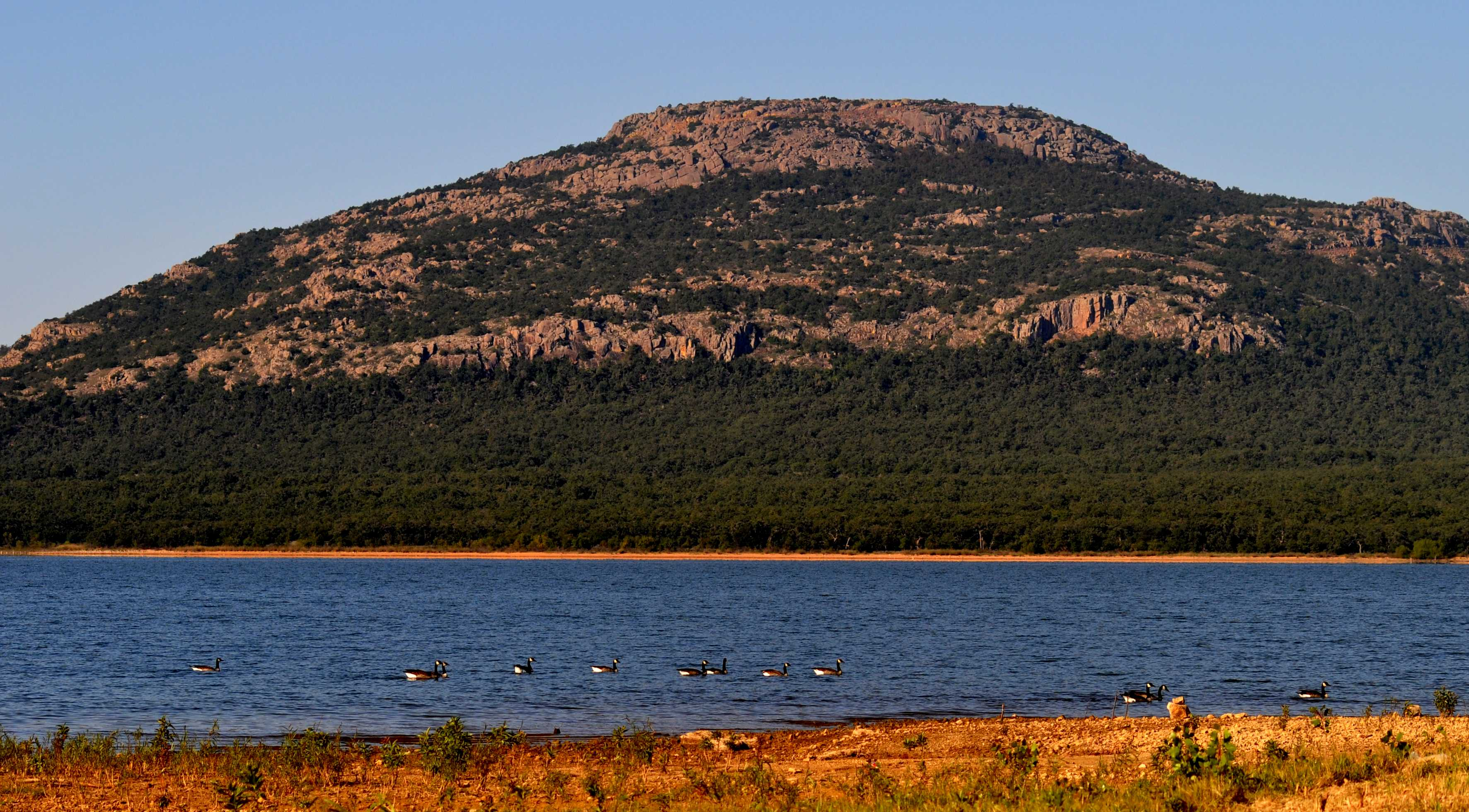
- East shore of Lake Lawtonka at sunset, with Canada geese. Mount Scott in background. Photo by Schyler, August 1, 2011.

- Location within Oklahoma Location within the United States
- Location: Comanche County, Oklahoma
- Coordinates: 34.7559°N 98.5041°W
- Type: reservoir
- Primary inflows: Medicine Creek
- Primary outflows: Medicine Creek
- Catchment area: 92 sq mi (240 km^{2})
- Basin countries: United States
- Managing agency: City of Lawton
- Built: 1905
- Surface area: 2,325 acres (941 ha)
- Average depth: 23.6 ft (7.2 m)
- Max. depth: 58.4 ft (17.8 m)
- Water volume: 63,000 acre⋅ft (0.078 km^{3})
- Shore length^{1}: 19.2 mi (30.9 km)
- Surface elevation: 1,345.55 ft (410.12 m)
- Settlements: Lawton, Medicine Park, Meers
- ^{1} Shore length is not a well-defined measure.

Lake Lawtonka is a lake in Comanche County in the state of Oklahoma in the United States. The lake is 2 square miles (5 km^{2}) in area. It is formed by a dam 60 feet (18 m) high and 375 feet (114 m) long across Medicine Creek.

The lake provides the water supply for the Fort Sill and Lawton communities as situated south of the water reservoir. The town of Medicine Park is south of the lake and provides a visual of the Lawtonka dam. Lawtonka Acres and Robinson's Landing Marina are located at the north shoreline boundaries of the Lawtonka recreation area.

== Recreation ==
Fishing and camping facilities are maintained by the city of Lawton.

== Landscape Pictorial ==
Lake Lawtonka and Wichita Mountains
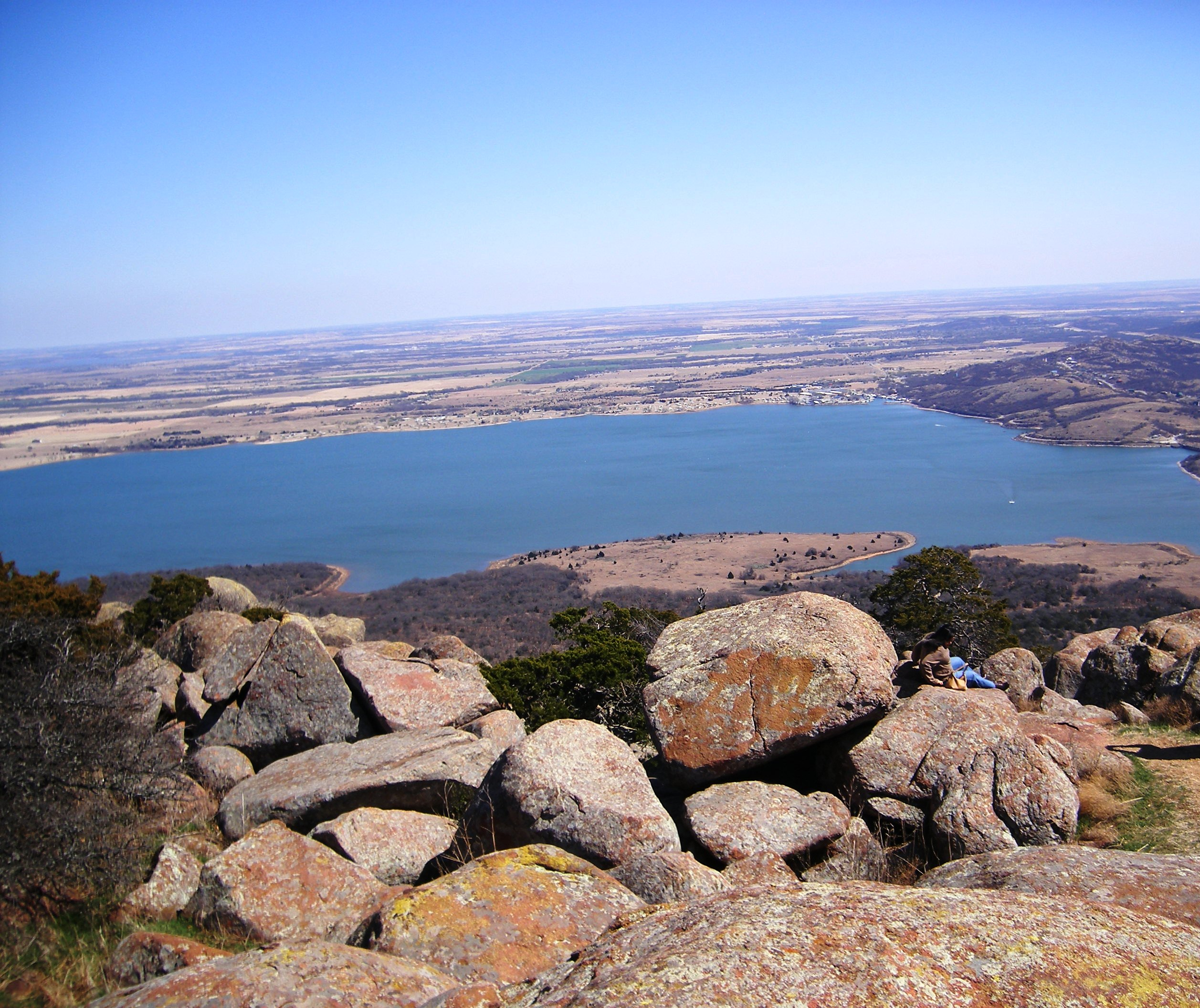
Mount Scott observation view of Lake Lawtonka

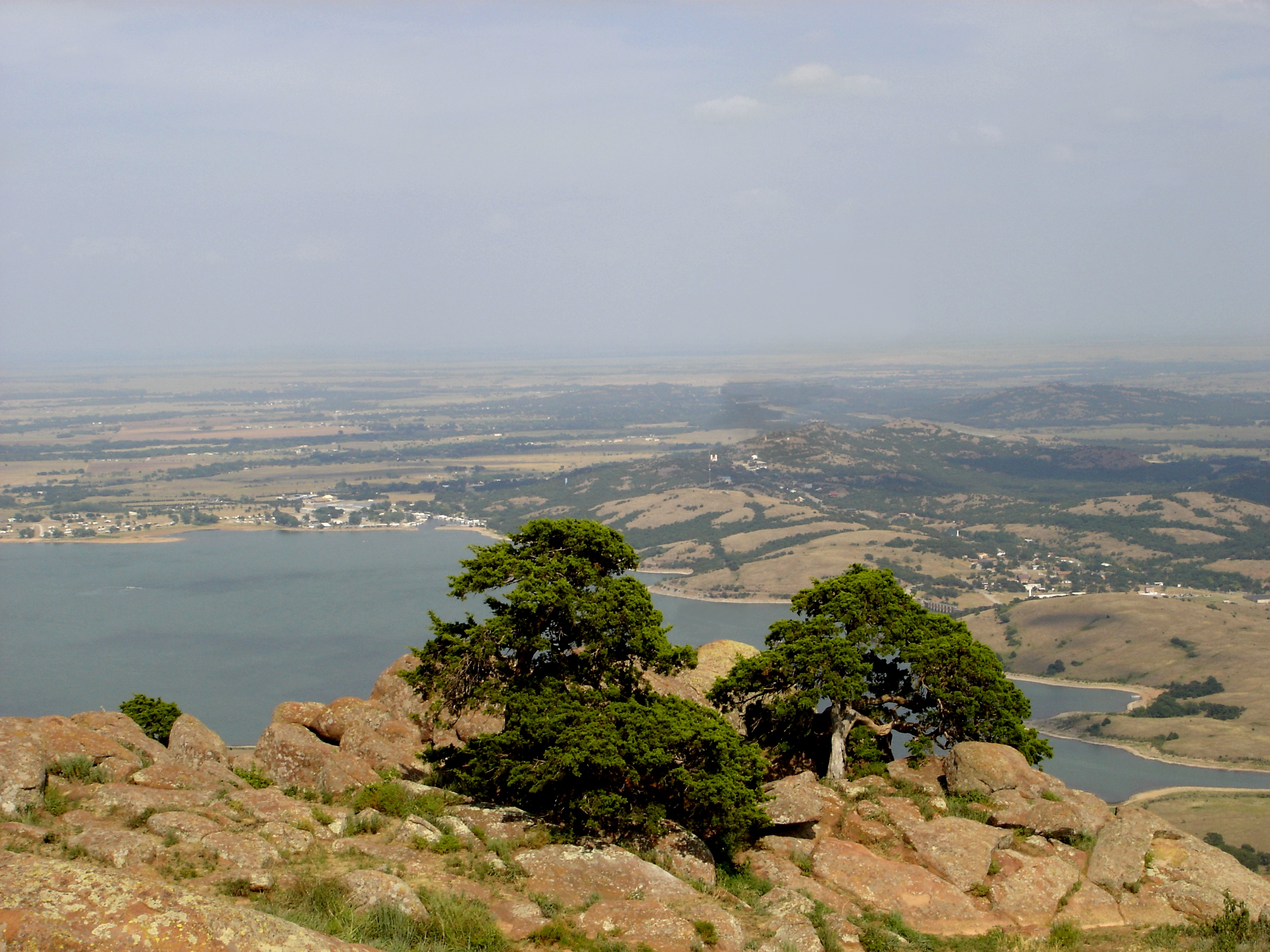
Mount Scott observation view of School House Slough Marina at Lake Lawtonka

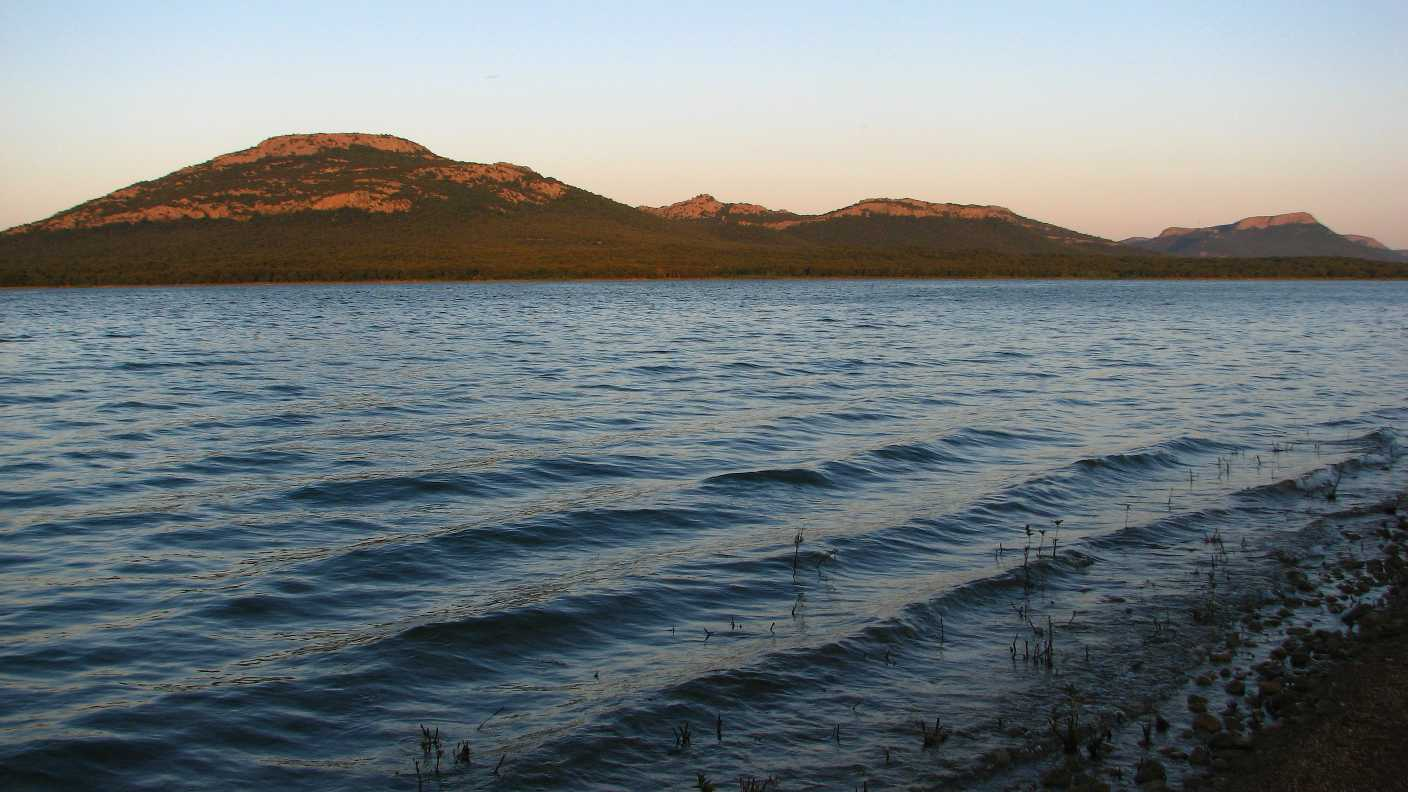
Mount Scott and Lake Lawtonka view from Robinson's Landing Marina

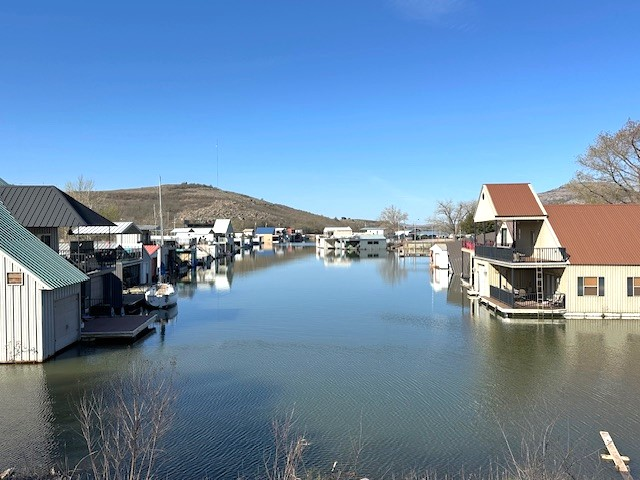
Medicine Park Lake Scene, 3-2025

== See also ==
- Cache Creek (Oklahoma)
- Mount Scott (Oklahoma)
- Wichita Mountains
- Wichita Mountains Wildlife Refuge
