= Kicking Bird =

Kiowa chief

- T’è:néáungopd̶e
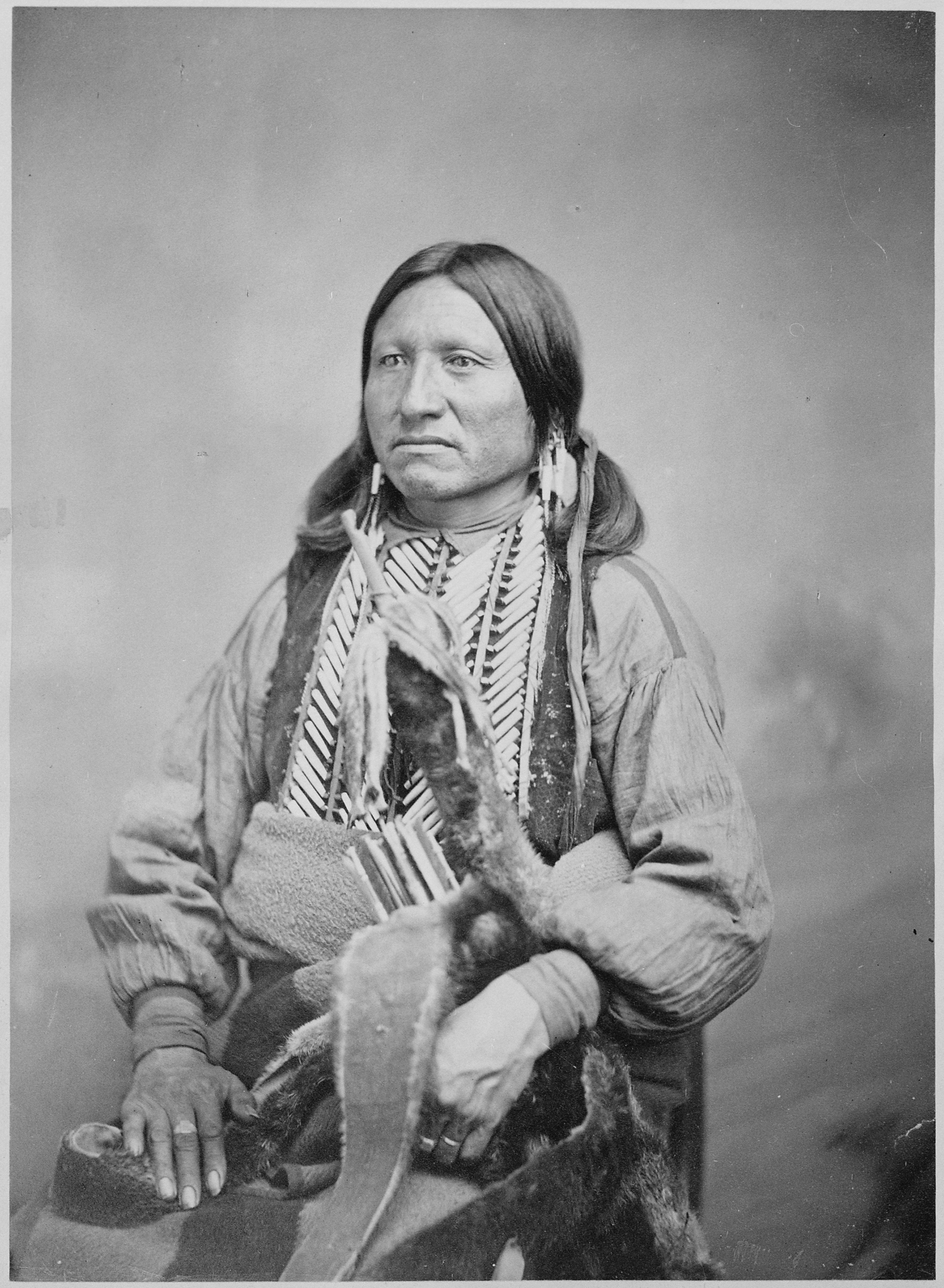
- Chief Kicking Bird
- Born: c. 1835; Possibly Oklahoma
- Died: May 3, 1875 (aged 39–40); Fort Sill, Oklahoma
- Other names: The Kicking Bird; Eagle Who Strikes with his Talons; Striking Eagle
- Known for: A Chief of the Kiowa Nation, warrior, peacemaker
- Relatives: Stumbling Bear (father); Son of the Sun (brother); Big Arrow (brother); Coquit (brother)

Kicking Bird, also known as T’è:néáungopd̶e, "The Kicking Bird", "Eagle Who Strikes with his Talons", or "Striking Eagle" (c. 1835 - May 3, 1875) was a High Chief of the Kiowa in the 1870s. It is said that he was given his name for the way he fought his enemies. He was a Kiowa, though his grandfather had been a Crow captive who was adopted by the Kiowa. His mysterious death at Fort Sill on May 3, 1875, is the subject of much debate and speculation.

Though he was a great warrior who participated in and led many battles and raids during the 1860s and 1870s, he is mostly known as an advocate for peace and education among his people. He enjoyed close relationships with whites, most notably the Quaker teacher Thomas Battey and Indian Agent James M. Haworth. The close relationships he enjoyed with whites engendered animosity among many of the Kiowas, making him a controversial figure. He would become the most prominent peace chief of the Kiowas, following the lead of a previous head chief, Dohasan. Kicking Bird was diplomatically active and signed the Little Arkansas Treaty of 1865 and the Medicine Lodge Treaty of 1867 and was instrumental in moving his people to reservations.

== Early life (1835–65) ==
At the time of Kicking Bird's birth in about 1835, the Kiowas inhabited the Texas Panhandle, western Oklahoma, and southwestern Kansas. Not much is known of his early life, but he participated in the Kiowa warrior tradition and was a renowned warrior and hunter. His early success qualified him as an "onde," or Kiowa warrior supreme, granting him first-rank social status in his tribe. In addition to an outstanding war-record, to be an "onde" required that a man be wealthy, generous, aristocratic in demeanor, and an imposing presence on horseback – all qualities possessed by Kicking Bird.

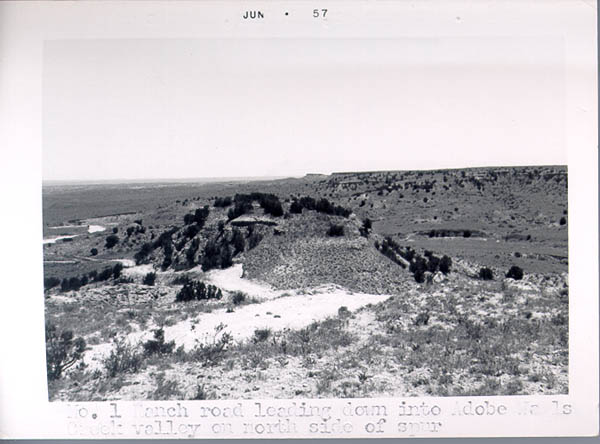
Adobe Walls Battlefield

He fought against the Utes of Colorado, Pawnees of Nebraska, Navajos of New Mexico, and in raids along the Santa Fe Trail where he may have been shot in 1864. On November 25, 1864, Kicking Bird, then a member of Dohasan's band of Kiowas, fought alongside Kiowas, Comanches, Apaches, and Arapahoes as Colonel Christopher "Kit" Carson's regular troops collided with the Indian forces in the Battle of Adobe Walls.

As Kicking Bird matured, he recognized the futility of the raiding that dominated Plains Indian societies during the 19th century and adopted a conciliatory leadership approach that focused on cultivating friendly relationships with whites. He rose to prominence in his late 20s and was acknowledged as a promising young Kiowa in 1859 by James Brice, who wrote "Kicking Bird was said to be a good Indian by white men that knew him and would some day become influential with his people and the government." Kicking Bird was noticeably absent from Kiowa peace treaties of the late 1850s and early 1860s, most likely because he had yet to earn his status as a Kiowa chief. It was not until 1865, around the age of 30, that Kicking Bird would become a Kiowa sub-chief.

A series of clashes between the Plains tribes and white settlers, such as the Sand Creek Massacre, induced peace talks in 1865. It is during this period of diplomacy between whites and Indians that Kicking Bird began to make his mark in a peaceful leadership position. He first emerged into public consciousness when he signed the Little Arkansas Treaty in 1865. He was especially active in returning white captives as evidence of good intentions while the terms of the Little Arkansas Treaty were being discussed.

The Little Arkansas Treaty moved the major Plains Indians Tribes to reservations which were never entirely established, and which were later reduced in size by the Treaty of Medicine Lodge; also, promised annuities were never distributed. These two issues would have long-lasting implications that Kicking Bird and other Kiowa chiefs would wrestle with in the following years.

== Later life (1865–75) ==
=== Political involvement ===
After Dohasan's death in 1866, Satanta (White Bear), Guipago (Lone Wolf), and Kicking Bird became locked in an intense rivalry for leadership of the Kiowa. War leaders Guipago (named by Dohasan himself as his heir) and Satanta were the clear favorites over the younger Kicking Bird (T’è:néáungopd̶e), but it was apparent that Kicking Bird, together with medicine-man No Mocassins (Napawat), was the foremost advocate for peace, taking up Dohasan's role as peace leader of the Kiowas. His calm and conciliatory demeanor facilitated an open relationship with whites, who admired him for his skills as an orator and diplomat. At Fort Dodge in 1866, commanding officer Henry Douglas stated that "Kicking Bird was the most reliable of all the Indians."

Kicking Bird's first actions as sub-chief were for peace, but he was primarily concerned with the annuity situation. When the Kiowa had moved onto the reservations, they had been promised annuity payments for buying food and supplies; however, the annuities were not always paid as promised, and were being handled by a corrupt agent who hampered the promised flow of goods. The Kiowa faced immense hardship as a result. Kicking Bird recognized that most of the bad feelings in his tribe stemmed from the annuity situation. Because of this, Kicking Bird was placed in a delicate position between warriors who wanted to go on the warpath and those that wanted peace with the whites. His close relationship with whites and peace-talks belittled his leadership position in the eyes of many Kiowa. As a result, after the head chief Guipago, Satanta emerged in a prominent leadership role among his people, and his reputation as a war-maker made him the dominant Kiowa figure to be reckoned with in the eyes of whites and other Indians.

Indian-white friction resurfaced following the Little Arkansas Treaty, and Kicking Bird was influential in maintaining peace, proving himself receptive to both Indian and white demands. The terms of the treaty were largely unfulfilled and hostilities throughout the Plains necessitated a new peacemaking treaty: the Treaty of Medicine Lodge. Alongside older and wiser chiefs like Black Kettle and Ten Bears, Kicking Bird realized the futility of militant opposition. During discussions at Medicine Lodge, he was prominently seated in the council circle and worked for a resolution of the annuity situation, but Satanta ultimately stood out as the leading Kiowa chief after the head chief Guipago. Kicking Bird was one of the first signatories of the Treaty of Medicine Lodge; Satanta too signed the treaty, but Guipago refused to do it. The Treaty of Medicine Lodge moved the Kiowa onto a reservation and promised annuities of food, clothes, equipment, weapons, and ammunition. The promised annuities were rarely fulfilled, however, which engendered tribal animosity toward the reservations and assimilation policies. This dissatisfaction was a central obstacle to Kicking Bird's peace efforts.

=== Obstacles to peace and prestige ===
As a result of the Battle of Washita, General Lt. Col. George Armstrong Custer arrested Guipago and Satanta and took them to Fort Sill. In 1869, Kicking Bird helped to obtain the release of Guipago and Satanta from army captivity after promising good behavior on their part. During the interim period, Kicking Bird figured prominently as a leading Kiowa chief.

In response to the lack of annuities and tribal land, the Kiowa and their contemporaries resorted to looting and plundering throughout the Plains, which undermined Kicking Bird's efforts towards peace. On January 15, 1870, a body of Kiowas under Satanta intercepted a Texas herd driven by Jacob Hershfield and robbed the drovers of money and supplies before killing some 150-200 head of cattle. Kicking Bird arrived on the scene and defused the situation. Hershfield accounted that had it not been for Kicking Bird, he and his men would have died.

Kicking Bird received intense criticism for his close relationships with white people and his renunciation of hunting and advocation of farming. The ranks of warring chiefs Satanta and Guipago swelled in comparison and Kicking Bird lost much tribal support. When the Kiowas hosted a sun dance to celebrate the Summer Moon of 1870, many warriors talked of staying out on the Plains instead of living on reservations with inadequate annuities. Kicking Bird spoke strongly against this and urged that the tribes cultivate friendly relations with the whites and continue to live on reservations. Though a chief, Kicking Bird received much scorn during the sun dance from young Kiowas, and the lack of respect was evident. They said "he had been a great warrior before the white men penned him up on the reservation. Now he talked like a woman."

=== Battle of Little Wichita River ===
Responding to claims that he was a coward and had become effeminate, Kicking Bird assembled a war party and invited some of his chief critics and worst tormentors to participate - Guipago, Tsen-tainte (White Horse), and Satank. Kiowa Old Man Horse accounted "Chiefs hostile to him said to him, ‘Kicking Bird, if you don't quit opposing us, we are going to kill you.' He said, ‘Alright go ahead.' ‘Kicking Bird,' they said, ‘you are nothing but a low-down unrecognized man, no longer a chief.' Kicking Bird said, ‘It may be true, but I am trying to put you in a good road which will be a protection for the lives of the women and children.'" Kicking Bird expressed his regret at having to prove himself in battle, but acquiesced nonetheless.

In July 1870, his war party, some 100 strong, crossed the Red River into Texas and confronted a Kansas-bound herd in Montague County, Texas, taking horses, mules, blankets, and other property. A few of his braves broke away from the war party and captured a mail stage at Rock Station, provoking a response from nearby Fort Richardson. On July 12 Captain Curwen B. McClellan and several of his officers from the Sixth Cavalry attacked Kicking Bird's encampment near present-day Seymour, Texas. In a long battle under a hot sun, Kicking Bird displayed his military genius and his right to his chieftaincy after thoroughly defeating McClellan's forces by engaging the soldiers in a frontal skirmish and sending two pincer columns to flank his enemy and strike the rear. In the battle, he was said to have personally lanced one soldier.

The Battle of Little Wichita River reaffirmed Kicking Bird's martial acumen and also reinforced his status as Kiowa chief. His victory marked the end of his military career and he expressed regret that tribal divisions forced his hand in the battle. He would spend the rest of his life cultivating peace with whites.

The schism between peace-minded and war-minded Kiowa leaders was exacerbated by the increased presence of the U.S. military and Quakers by the end of 1870. Kicking Bird was clearly the foremost advocate for an accommodation with the United States, but was opposed by Satanta, Guipago, Ado-ete (Big Tree), Maman-ti, and Tsen-tainte. He represented the Kiowa peace-faction in numerous intertribal meetings and promised that the Kiowa would live respectfully on the land, but again stressed that without the necessary annuities from the government, his people were forced to stray from the reservations to survive.

=== Warren Wagontrain Raid ===
In 1871, a ten-wagon mule train moving through Texas was attacked by some 100 Kiowa and Comanche warriors under the direction of Satanta, Satank, and Maman-ti. The motive behind the attack was clearly the annuity situation. As a result, General William T. Sherman ordered the arrest of Satanta, Big Tree, and Satank, and this was done in spite of the willingness to fight for their liberty unequivocally proclaimed by Guipago. A historic trial ensued. Kicking Bird became the prominent Kiowa spokesmen. General Sherman spoke to Kicking Bird: "Kicking Bird, the President has heard of you. He knows your name and has written about you. We are all depending on you." Kicking Bird did all he could to save Satanta, Big Tree, and Satank, but his efforts were ultimately futile and he acquiesced to their arrest. Following the arrest, Guipago stubbornly worked in confrontation with government agents, showing his willingness to reject Washington's "peace" and fight like a traditional Kiowa warrior, while Kicking Bird worked to calm his tribesmen as the three chiefs were transferred to Fort Richardson. The difficulties of 1871 placed Kicking Bird in a top leadership position, and he was recognized as the leading Kiowa peace chief by the U.S. government and a large portion of the Kiowa as well.

=== Efforts towards conciliation, 1871–73 ===
Over the next two years Kicking Bird worked to obtain the release of Satanta and Big Tree. He participated in numerous assemblies as a representative of the Kiowa alongside Guipago, and promised to restore peace among the Kiowa. He demonstrated his good intentions by returning white prisoners to the Wichita agency and discouraging his people from taking the war path. However, with tensions still soaring after the arrest of Satanta, Big Tree, and Satank, Kicking Bird was able to achieve little success.

Kicking Bird engaged in numerous activities to placate Texas governor Edmund J. Davis, who was strongly opposed to releasing Satanta and Big Tree. Many Kiowas followed his example and acknowledged that peace was the only viable option for release. The Kiowas returned captives and livestock without ransom, and even offered to rescue captives from other tribes. For his conciliatory work among the tribes, Kicking Bird received a silver medal. In some instances, Kicking Bird threatened not only his own warriors but war parties from other tribes as well in order to stop the raiding.

During a June 1873 sun dance, Kicking Bird personally prevented a major Indian outbreak. Discouraged about Satanta and Big Tree's imprisonment, many chiefs clamored for a multitribal assault on the outside forces. Kicking Bird spoke against military action and urged patience. The excitement abated, and the chiefs agreed to wait. This meeting was maybe the closest the Plains tribes would ever come to a multi-tribal assault.

Finally, on October 7, 1873, Satanta and Big Tree were released, a result of Guipago's straightforward explanation to Indian agent James Haworth that the patience of his Kiowa warriors, as well as his own, was wearing thin after the Kiowa had lived up to their promises by remaining peaceful in the summer of 1873. According to his apologists, Kicking Bird's skillful negotiation in the release of Satanta and Big Tree earned him the loyalty of nearly two-thirds of his tribesmen.

=== Head chief ===
Kicking Bird's adeptness as a peace leader could not prevent his tribe's immense dissatisfaction with conditions on the reservations, and, in late 1873, the Kiowa once again took the warpath. In the midst of the fighting, Guipago's favorite son was killed in a raid. Guipago, who had walked the peace path, was now indisposed, and with Satanta removed from his position as war chief, which he had lost while imprisoned, Kicking Bird was supported by the U.S. authorities as head chief of the Kiowas.

Kicking Bird was successful in keeping his followers on the reservation, but Guipago's scorn towards the "road of peace" and attitude towards that of war severely undermined Kicking Bird's efforts at pacification. On June 27, 1874, a consolidated force of warriors launched an attack that would become known as the Second Battle of Adobe Walls. Guipago and Satanta were among the Kiowas participating in the skirmish. Following the battle, Kicking Bird and Satanta were in favor of making peace, but Guipago and several other chiefs refused and advocated war against the whites. Kicking Bird worked earnestly to keep his people unified and avoid conflict, but both of his goals proved elusive.

In response to the increase of Indian raids throughout the Plains, the United States War Department overrode the Quaker Indian peace policy and issued orders to separate the Kiowas into two groups of friendly and unfriendly Kiowa. True to his word, Kicking Bird led three-fourths of the Kiowa back to their reservation at Fort Sill, which had become a city of refuge for his people. Meanwhile, Indian hostilities continued and Kicking Bird actively sought to pacify the raiding Kiowas and protect them from punishment. He succeeded in bringing six chiefs and 77 tribespeople, who surrendered their arms, to the reservation. Meanwhile, the hostile chiefs led the remainder of the Kiowa westward with the objective of reaching safe haven at Palo Duro Canyon, while the U.S. Army followed at their heels.

When Satanta stepped down as war chief in late 1874, to be arrested immediately thereafter, and Guipago surrendered early the next year, Kicking Bird became the only remaining Kiowa chief with a sizable following. Consequently, the U.S. Army gladly named him Kiowa principal chief in 1875. Throughout late 1874 and early 1875, Kicking Bird assisted the Army with their efforts to track the hostile Kiowas.

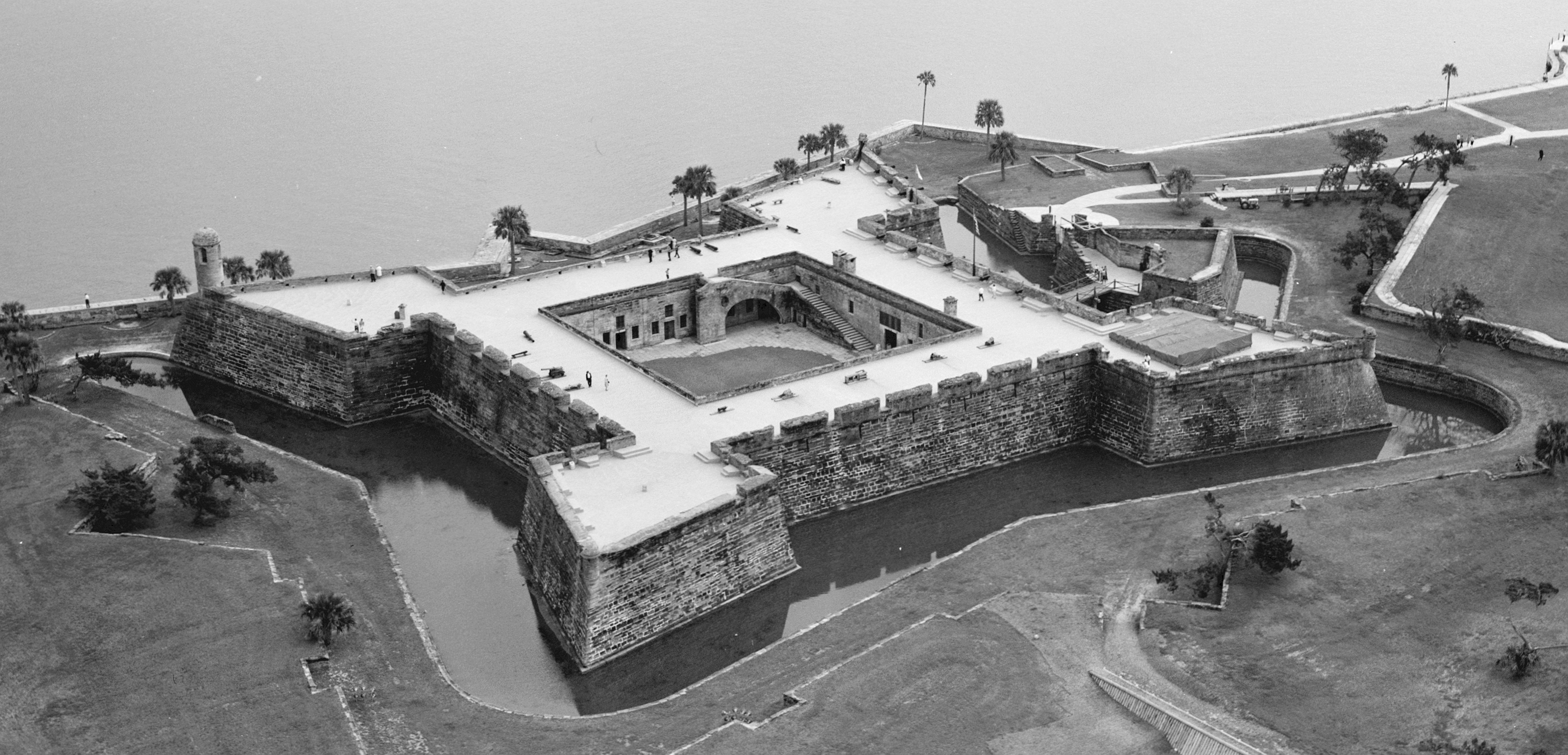
Fort Marion where hostile Kiowa were sent for incarceration.

As chief and the principal intermediary between federal authorities and his tribe, Kicking Bird was put in charge of the Kiowa captured in the 1874-1875 uprising. When it was decided that some of the hostile Kiowa would be sent to Florida for incarceration at Fort Marion, Kicking Bird was required to choose which of his tribesmen would go. This greatly disturbed Kicking Bird, who considered it no easy chore but ultimately in the best interest for peace. He reluctantly chose Guipago, Maman-ti (Walking-above), Tsen-tainte (White Horse), and 23 other Kiowas, while Satanta was sent back to Huntsville. Comanches, Cheyennes, Arapahoes, and Mexican captives were also sent to Fort Marion, for a total of about 70 prisoners. His acquiescence to the demands of the army was interpreted as treason by many members of his tribe, but others grudgingly accepted Kicking Bird's action as a peace measure.

== Education ==
Kicking Bird was the foremost Kiowa advocate for education and enjoyed a close relationship with Quaker teacher Thomas C. Battey. Kicking Bird and Battey first met on February 18, 1872, and in later meetings Kicking Bird requested that Battey, or Thomissey as he was known, teach his daughter Topen and live among the Kiowa. Battey was understandably fearful of the Kiowa, but was reassured in numerous meetings with Kiowa leaders that the Quaker would be greeted with friendship and peace.

After waiting for tensions to settle among the Kiowa, Kicking Bird agreed to take Battey back with him to his camp. Kicking Bird's brother Ze'bile invited Battey to share his lodge and Battey soon began teaching. The first Kiowa classes opened on January 23, 1873, and were hampered by a language barrier and intrusive and curious onlookers. Early on, Battey faced some opposition but was protected by Kicking Bird and other chiefs. Kicking Bird's interest in schooling for the Kiowa children was paramount in bringing education to his tribe but in the context of the assimilation policy, not all Kiowa welcomed white education.

With many influential Kiowa following the path of formal education for Kiowa children set by Kicking Bird and Battey, the first school for the Kiowa, Comanche, and Apache children of Fort Sill post was established. The school opened on February 27, 1875, and Agent Haworth appointed two chiefs from each of the tribes to serve as a board of education. Forty-four Kiowa and Comanche children were soon enrolled.

== Mysterious death and family ==
On May 3, 1875, while at Fort Sill, Kicking Bird died suddenly after drinking a cup of coffee. Around 40 years old, Kicking Bird received a Christian burial at Fort Sill. He is buried alongside many notable Kiowa and Comanche leaders: Satank, Satanta, Stumbling Bear, Big Bow, Hunting Horse, and Quanah Parker. Numerous accounts of Kicking Bird's death have surfaced but none have proven conclusive.

The most popular story maintains that Kicking Bird was poisoned by a vindictive tribesman. It was widely assumed that, with his death occurring relatively soon after the departure of the Fort Marion prisoners, an angry Kiowa or a white who stood to gain from the chief's death slipped poison into his coffee. One account holds that Kicking Bird may have been poisoned by one of his wives for having delivered her brother to Fort Marion.

Another story maintains that the medicine man Maman-ti placed a hex of death on Kicking Bird for his role in naming prisoners to be sent to Fort Marion, himself included. Most contemporary Kiowas accepted this legend, though it too proves inconclusive. Had Maman-ti's hex of death been successful, he would have perished three days after Kicking Bird. Instead, his death came on July 29, 1875 (three months after Kicking Bird's), and may have been the result of the close confinement within the walls of the old Spanish Fort.

Still another account of Kicking Bird's death maintains that something may have been wrong with his heart that caused his death. Agent Haworth noted that the night before his death, Kicking Bird had been up late and told someone that "his heart felt just like someone had hold of it pulling it out." The next morning, as was custom for almost all diseases, Kicking Bird went to the creek and came back after he felt better. Shortly after coming out of the water and having a cup of coffee, Kicking Bird died. This version fits descriptions in modern medical science of someone having a heart attack, but is not conclusive.

Kicking Bird had a daughter, Topen, as well as five other children, with his first wife, who died in 1872. After he remarried in 1874, he had a son Little John, who was ten months old when Kicking Bird died.

His known brothers were Pai-Talyi' (Son-of-the-Sun, or Sun Boy), Ze'bile (Big Arrow), and Coquit. His father was Andrew Stumbling Bear.

== See also ==
- Dohasan
- Satank
- Guipago
- Satanta
- Zepko-ete
- Mamanti
- Tsen-tainte
- Ado-ete

== Bibliography ==
- Brown, Dee Alexander. Bury My Heart at Wounded Knee: An Indian History of the American West. New York: Bantam, 1972.
- Hamilton, Allen Lee. "WARREN WAGONTRAIN RAID." Handbook of Texas Online. Texas State Historical Association. https://tshaonline.org/handbook/online/articles/btw03
- Hoig, Stan, and Wilbur S. Nye. The Kiowas & the Legend of Kicking Bird. Niwot: University of Colorado, 2000.
- Hosmer, Brian C."KICKING BIRD." Handbook of Texas Online. Texas State Historical Association. https://tshaonline.org/handbook/online/articles/fki03
- May, Jon D. "KICKING BIRD (ca. 1835-1875)." KICKING BIRD (ca. 1835-1875). Oklahoma Historical Society, 2007. Web. 17 Mar. 2013. http://digital.library.okstate.edu/encyclopedia/entries/K/KI006.html.
- Meadows, William C. Kiowa, Apache, and Comanche Military Societies: Enduring Veterans, 1800 to the Present. Austin: University of Texas, 1999.
- Schnell, Steven M. "The Kiowa Homeland in Oklahoma." Geographical Review 90.2 (2000): 155–76. JSTOR. Web. 19 Mar. 2013.
