= Maman-ti =

Mama'nte He Walks-Above / Sky Walker
- G̶áuñ:mâmáñ:d̶è

Kiowa leader

Personal details
- Born: c. 1835
- Died: July 28, 1875 Fort Marion, St. Augustine, Florida, U.S.
- Cause of death: sickness (possibly venom)
- Known for: 1865–1875 as a medicine man, heavily influenced the Kiowa tribe during the last decade of the "Indian wars"

Mamante or Mamanti (Kiowa: G̶áuñ:mâmáñ:d̶è, shortened form Mâmáñ:d̶è, lit. ''Goose-Above-CameAlong-One''), also known as "He Walks-Above", "Sky Walker", or Swan (c. 1835 – July 28, 1875) was a Kiowa medicine man.

His name is also translated in several ways, including Man-on-a-Cloud, Sky Walker, Walking Above, or Walks-in-the-Sky. After the head chief Dohäsan died in 1866, naming Guipago, or Lone Wolf the Elder, as his own designated heir and consequently establishing Satanta as the second-ranking chief, Mamanti assumed the role of a war chief, but he got real power when he gained screech owl medicine and became an owl prophet. His rivalry as a medicine man was versus Napawat (No Moccasins), a powerful and influential man friendly to Tene-angopte.

Mamanti had two wives. He had several children with both of his wives, and also an adopted settler-born son with red hair named Tehan or Tejan.

== The Warren wagon train ==
On May 18, 1871, the Warren wagon-train, travelling down the Jacksboro-Belknap road heading towards Salt Creek Crossing, met a large group of riders ahead. Hidden in a thicket of scrub in the Salt Creek Prairie, the Kiowa had observed, without attacking, the transit of Gen. William Tecumseh Sherman's inspection retinue.[2] The previous night, Mamanti, had prophesied that this small party would be followed by a larger one with more plunder for the taking, and the warriors let the soldiers go. Only three hours later the 10 mule-drawn wagons filled with army corn and fodder were caught in the ambush, and the warriors destroyed the corn supplies, killing seven of the wagon runners and mutilating their bodies.[3] The Kiowa warriors lost three of their own, but left with 40 mules[4] heavily laden with supplies. Five white men managed to escape, one of which, Thomas Brazeale[5], walked to Fort Richardson, some 20 miles away. Col. Ranald S. Mackenzie, as soon as learned of the incident, informed Sherman. Mamanti wasn't identified as one among the leaders, along with Satanta, Satank and Ado-ete; notwithstanding the intervention of Guipago, with loaded rifles and guns and well ready to fight,[6] they were arrested at Fort Sill. Along the way to Jacksboro, Texas, Satank attempted escape and was killed while traveling to Fort Richardson for trial. Satanta and Ado-ete in 1871 were sentenced to Huntsville prison. After a long and hard dealing with the U.S. Government officers (finally Guipago told the Commissioner that he must consult with Satanta and Ado-ete), in 1872 (Sept. 29) Guipago was allowed to meet his friend Satanta and the young war chief Ado-ete in St. Louis, and only after this he accepted to go to Washington with some other Kiowa, Comanche, Cheyenne, Arapaho, Wichita and Delaware chiefs and talk about peace with President Ulysses S. Grant; after Satanta and Ado-ete were temporarily paroled, Guipago led the Kiowa delegation to Washington in September 1872, and got Indian Commissioner E.P. Smith's promise to release the two captives; Guipago was told in Washington the Kiowa had to camp ten miles near Fort Sill by December 15, 1872, and he agreed after having obtained that the two captive chiefs were turned back to their people; Satanta and Ado-ete were definitively released only in September 1873, Guipago having made clear to Indian agent James M. Haworth that his patience was now at its end. Even in the great Guipago's and Satanta's triumph, Mamanti's brightness, still opposed by Napawat and Tene-angopte, was to be obscured by a younger Comanche medicine man, Isa-tai within a couple of years.

== Adobe Walls and the Red River War ==
On June 27–28, 1874, Mamanti (unlike Guipago, Satanta and Tsen-tainte) didn't take part in the attack against the hidemen and buffalo hunters at Adobe Walls, but, having gone to Texas for a raid in the summer, he joined Guipago and the Comanche leaders during the Red River War, being involved in the Battle of the Upper Washita River, the long-knives attack on Palo Duro Canyon, and later went with Guipago to the Staked Plains. Mamanti surrendered with Guipago at Fort Sill on February 25, 1875.

After Guipago's surrender Tene-angopte was charged by the U.S. Army to select the Kiowa prisoners for incarceration at Fort Marion in St. Augustine, Florida, where they would remain until 1879, and Mamanti was one of the 27. Before leaving, the medicine man placed a hex of death on Tene-angopte for his role in naming prisoners to be sent to Fort Marion. There he died on 28 July 1875 from dysentery or, possibly, from venom, not even three months after Tene-angopte’s death.

== See also ==
- Dohasan
- Satank
- Guipago
- Satanta
- Zepko-ete
- Tene-angopte
- Tsen-tainte
- Ado-ete
