= Tehan (Kiowa) =

Tehan or Tejan (c. 1856–1874/1875) was an American settler who was taken captive by the Kiowa tribe and was adopted by the chief Maman-ti.

== Biography ==
Tehan was a white captive, adopted into the Kiowa tribe. His name came from the native pronunciation of "Texan", which was derived of the Spanish demonym for the inhabitants of Texas, Tejan(a/o). Under Maman-ti, he became a strong warrior and eventually fought in the Red River War, at about eighteen years old. He was captured by US forces, and even though he "thanked the soldiers for his deliverance", he was incarcerated. On September 14, 1874, he escaped his captivity by U.S. soldiers during the Battle of Lyman's Wagon Train, and returned to the native camp. He later went on a raid with the chief Big Bow in the Llano Estacado region of Texas, and died during that expedition.

Various accounts of his death exist. One account is that Big Bow stated that Tehan was captured during the events of the raid and gave authorities all that he knew about the natives, and was possibly executed afterwards. Another is that Big Bow stated that Tehan had died of thirst in the desert, while retreating from the raid. Although another claims that his foster sister met a Comanche that reportedly said Tehan had gone on his way to Fort Sill to care for his adopted mother, after his adopted father died at Fort Marion.

== Popular culture ==
Tehan's story is told in the Canadian film Dreamkeeper, he is played by the actor Scott Grimes.
