= Lawrie Tatum =

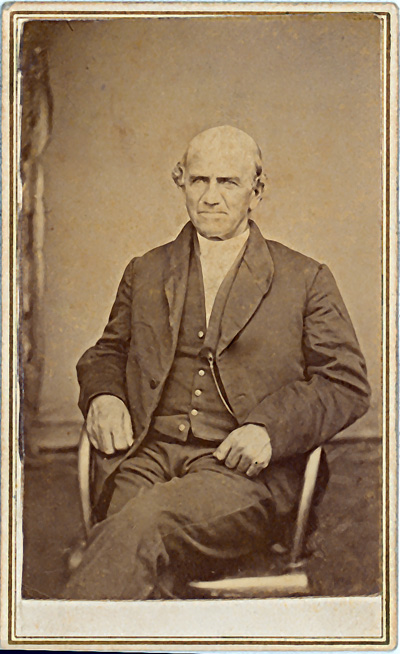
Lawrie Tatum

Lawrie Tatum (May 16, 1822 in Mullica Hill, New Jersey - January 22, 1900 in Springdale, Iowa) was a Quaker who was best known as an Indian Agent to the Kiowa and Comanche tribes at Fort Sill agency in Indian Territory.

He was born to Quaker parents George and Lydia Tatum near Mullica Hill, New Jersey in 1822 and moved to Goshen, Ohio in 1831 followed by a move to Cedar County, Iowa in 1844.

When President Ulysses S. Grant's "Peace Policy" concerning U.S. policy with Native American tribes went into effect, officials of the Society of Friends (Quakers) met with Grant and requested members of their organization be assigned as Indian agents. This led to the "Quaker Policy"; replacing corrupt agents in the Indian Bureau with Quakers, which was later expanded to include other religious denominations. On July 1, 1869, Tatum began his duties "acting in the capacity of governor, legislature, judge, sheriff and accounting officer" for the Kiowa and Comanche Agency at Fort Sill in the Indian Territory.

Tatum was known to the Kiowa and Comanche tribes as "Bald Head (Agent)": Tan-p'a̱wy-gya-t'a̱wy in Kiowa, and Pot-ta-wat Pervo in Comanche. While acting as Indian agent, Tatum secured the release of many white and Mexican captives, including the family of Gottfried Koozer, whose wife and five children were kidnapped by Chief White Horse of the Kiowa.

Tatum resigned as an Indian agent for the Comanche, Kiowa, and Wichita Reservation on March 31, 1873 with James M. Haworth appointed as his successor. Lawrie Tatum's departure precipitated partly to his opposition and protest for the release of Satanta and the Kiowa chief's participation in the Warren Wagon Train raid of 1871.

In 1884, he was appointed guardian to future United States president Herbert Hoover and Hoover's brother Theodore and sister Mary after the death of their mother.

Having worked closely with American Indians and President Ulysses S. Grant, Tatum wrote an account of Grant's Peace Policy, entitled, Our red brothers and the peace policy of President Ulysses S. Grant, first published in 1899.

== Bibliography ==
- Tatum, Lawrie (1970) [1899]. Our red brothers and the peace policy of President Ulysses S. Grant. Lincoln, University of Nebraska Press.
- Burnette, Brandon R.; Morrison, Sharon L. "Tatum, Lawrie (1822–1900)". Encyclopedia of Oklahoma History and Culture. Oklahoma Historical Society.
- Buntin, Martha (June 1932). "The Quaker Indian Agents of the Kiowa, Comanche, and Wichita Indian Reservation" [The Chronicles of Oklahoma ~ Vol. 10, No. 2 - June 1932]. Chronicles of Oklahoma. 10 (2). Oklahoma Historical Society: 204–218. LCCN 23027299. OCLC 655582328.
- Steele, Aubrey L. (December 1939). "The Beginning of Quaker Administration of Indian Affairs in Oklahoma" [The Chronicles of Oklahoma ~ Vol. 17, No. 4 - December 1939]. Chronicles of Oklahoma. 17 (4). Oklahoma Historical Society: 364–392. LCCN 23027299. OCLC 655582328.
- Steele, Aubrey L. (1944). "Lawrie Tatum's Indian Policy" [The Chronicles of Oklahoma ~ Vol. 22, No. 1 - Spring 1944]. Chronicles of Oklahoma. 22 (1). Oklahoma Historical Society: 83–98. LCCN 23027299. OCLC 655582328.
- Zwink, T. Ashley (1978). "On the White Man's Road: Lawrie Tatum and The Formative Years of the Kiowa Agency, 1869-1873" [The Chronicles of Oklahoma ~ Vol. 56, No. 4 - Winter 1978-79]. Chronicles of Oklahoma. 56 (4). Oklahoma Historical Society: 431–441. LCCN 23027299. OCLC 655582328.
- White, Wayne A. (2015). ""This Faithfulness Destroyed Them": The Failure of Grant's Peace Policy Among the Kiowas and Comanches" [The Chronicles of Oklahoma ~ Vol. 93, No. 2 - Summer 2015]. Chronicles of Oklahoma. 93 (2). Oklahoma Historical Society: 182–199. LCCN 23027299. OCLC 655582328.
