= Big Tree (Kiowa leader) =

Kiowa warrior and chief

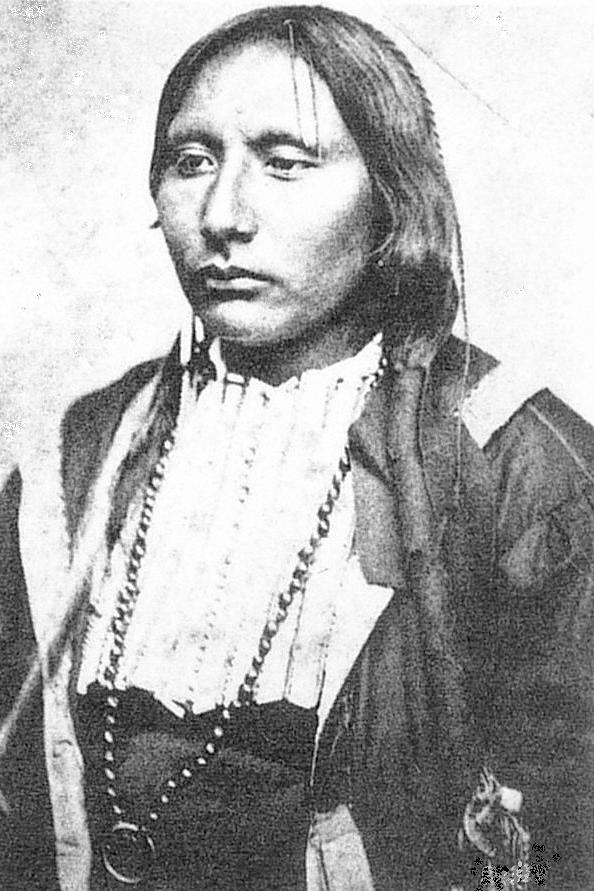
Big Tree

Á:dàuiétd̶è or Big Tree (ca. 1850–1929), was a noted Kiowa warrior and chief. He was a loyal follower of the fighting chiefs party (led by Satank, Satanta, and Guipago), and conducted frequent raids upon other tribes and white settlers, often being associated with Tsen-tainte ("White Horse").

Born in Kiowa territory (possibly present-day Oklahoma), Big Tree, along with the Kiowa, was forced onto a reservation at Fort Sill in the Indian Territory by the Medicine Lodge Treaty Council in 1867. He began leading raids against white settlers near the reservation and across the Red River in northern Texas. In 1870, Big Tree purportedly led a raid on Fort Sill in Indian Territory, but gained his notoriety from the Warren Wagon Train raid the following year. Big Tree was arrested days later, along with Satanta and Satank, and tried for murder in Jacksboro, Texas. They were the first American Indian chiefs to be tried in civil court.

== The Warren Wagon Train and trial ==
On May 18, 1871, the Warren Wagon Train, traveling down the Jacksboro-Belknap road heading towards Salt Creek Crossing, met a large group of riders ahead. Hidden in a thicket of scrub in the Salt Creek Prairie, the Kiowa had observed, without attacking, the transit of General William Tecumseh Sherman's inspection retinue. The previous night, Mamanti ("He Walks-Above" or "Sky Walker"), the powerful shaman rival of Tene-angopte ("Kicking Bird" or "Striking Eagle")'s friend Napawat ("No Moccasins"), had prophesied that this small party would be followed by a larger one with more plunder for the taking, and the warriors let the soldiers go. Only three hours later the ten mule-drawn wagons filled with army corn and fodder fell into the ambush, and the warriors destroyed the corn supplies, killing seven of the wagoners and mutilating their bodies. The Kiowa warriors lost three of their own but left with forty mules heavily laden with supplies. Five white men managed to escape, one of whom, Thomas Brazeale, walked to Fort Richardson, some twenty miles away. Col. Ranald S. Mackenzie, as soon as he learned of the incident, informed Sherman. Unlike some others (such as Tsen-tainte "White Horse", Zepko-ete "Big Bow" and Mamanti), Ado-ete ("Big Tree") was identified as one of the leaders, along with Satanta and Satank; notwithstanding the intervention of Guipago, with loaded rifles and guns and well prepared to fight, they were arrested and jailed at Fort Sill. Along the way to Jacksboro, Texas, while traveling to Fort Richardson for trial, Satank attempted to escape and was killed. Satanta was found guilty of murder and sentenced to death, as was Big Tree; but Edmund Davis, the Governor of Texas, under enormous pressure from leaders of the so-called Quaker Peace Policy, decided to overrule the court, and the punishment for both was commuted to life imprisonment. Satanta and Big Tree were convicted of murder on 5–6 July in Jack County, Texas. Thanks to the stubborn behavior of Guipago, who forced the U.S. government to agree by seriously threatening a new bloody war, Satanta and Big Tree were freed after two years of imprisonment at the Huntsville State Penitentiary in Texas.

Big Tree did not join the Kiowa party, led by Guipago and Satanta, going with the Comanche chief Quanah and several others to wipe out the hidemen at Adobe Walls, nor did he take part in the Red River and Buffalo Hunters' Wars, so when Chief Kicking Bird was forced by General Philip Sheridan to choose those among his tribe to be imprisoned in the east, Big Tree was not among them. In 1878, he and the other Kiowa were returned to the reservation in Indian Territory near Fort Sill, where he had still a career as a chief until he died on November 27, 1929.

== See also ==
- Warren Wagon Train Raid
- Second Battle of Adobe Walls
- Guipago
- Satanta
- Satank
- Tene-angopte
- Zepko-ete
- Mamanti
- Tsen-tainte
