= Koitsenko =

Kiowa warriors

The Koitsenko (Kiowa: k’ói:tséñgàu, lit. 'ten bravest society') was a group of the ten greatest warriors of the Kiowa tribe as a whole, from all bands. One was Satank who died while being taken to trial for the Warren Wagon Train Raid. The Koitsenko were elected out of the various military societies of the Kiowa, the "Dog Soldiers." They were elected by all the members of all the warrior societies of the entire tribe.

== Warrior societies among the Kiowa ==
There were six warrior societies in the Kiowa Tribe during the plains nomad years. Five were for grown warriors, the sixth for boys. The military societies were called "Dog Soldiers" because of visions and dreams of dogs. The Koitsenko were known as the "Real Dogs." All young boys were enrolled in the Rabbit Warrior Society, the sixth recognized warrior society. The other five could be joined as the boys grew up. The O-Ho-Mah Warrior Society, Kiowa Black Leggings Warrior Society and Kiowa Gourd Dance Clan are warrior societies. The most skilled members and elite of all the warriors out of all the societies of every branch of the Kiowa were the Koitsenko. The Koitsenko was an honorary group of ten greatest warriors who were elected from the five adult warrior societies. The soldier societies policed the campsite and went on hunts and into war.

In the Keah-ko Winter count, White Bear is represented as passing on the leadership of the Koitsenko to White Bear in 1874.

== How a warrior advanced ==
When a young man had distinguished himself enough to be considered an adult and warrior, he might be taken in by one of the five warrior societies. Members of this group of warrior societies were the protectors of the tribe. Referred to by other tribes as "dog soldiers," these men were willing to lay down their lives in defense of the Kiowa people. The Koitsenko were the height to which all warriors and members of warrior societies strove. To be named by all the members of all the warrior societies as one of the ten greatest warriors living was the ultimate honor for a Kiowa warrior.

== Emblems of the warrior societies ==
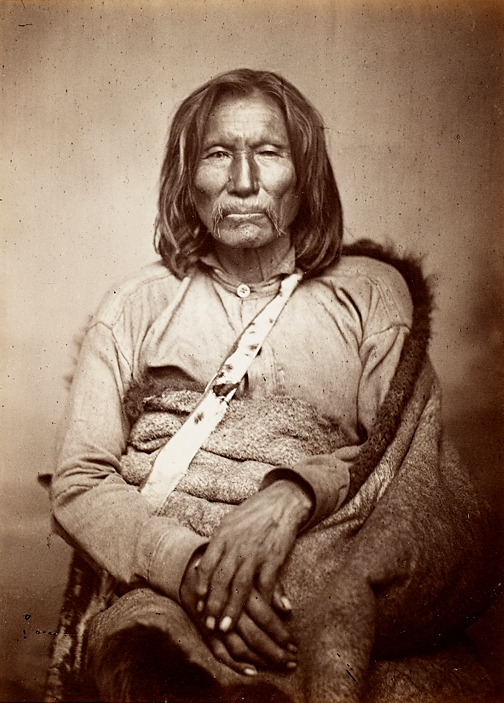
Satank, wearing the badge of the Koitsenko order, a leather strap, over his shoulder. Portrait by William S. Soule, 1870.

Sashes were worn by the ten members of the society. Black, red and spotted antelope for the leader. You can see the spotted antelope sash being worn in the picture of 'Satank'. (The leadership sash of the Ten).

== Still existing today ==
Three of the six warrior societies still exist among the Kiowa. Their traditions, dances, stories, were remembered sufficiently to keep alive the warrior tradition that made their people unique.

The "Kiowa Gourd Dance Clan", "O-Ho-Mah Warrior Society", and "Kiowa Black Leggings Warrior Society" still exist for adults. Kiowa's two youth societies still exist but not the Koitsenko.

== Notable Koitsenko members ==
- Tohausen
- Guipahgo (Old Chief Lonewolf)
- Satank (Sitting Bear)
- Satanta (White Bear)
- Ko-Et-Hai (No Retreat)
- Gool-hay-yee (Everything Red)
