= Battle of Adobe Walls =

Battle of Adobe Walls may refer to two battles occurring near Adobe Walls, Hutchinson County, Texas:

- First Battle of Adobe Walls, November 25, 1864
- Second Battle of Adobe Walls, June 27, 1874
