= Big Bow (Kiowa leader) =

- Zépg̶àuiètd̶è
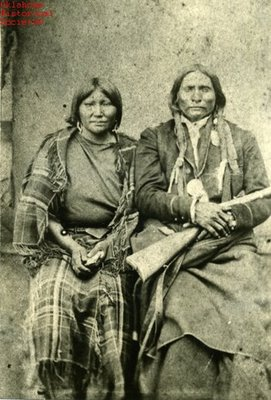
- Big Bow (right), Kiowa war chief
- Born: 1833
- Died: circa 1900

Zépg̶àuiètd̶è or Big Bow (c. 1833–c. 1900) was a Kiowa war leader during the 19th century, an associate of Guipago and Satanta.

Big Bow's name in Kiowa is Zépg̶àuiètd̶è, also spelled Zepko-ete and Za-ko-yea. He was born in Elk Creek in Indian Territory in about 1833.

He was active in the Southern Plains, in the present day states of Kansas, Oklahoma, and Texas. Big Bow raided native and non-native settlements and took part in the Warren Wagon Train Raid, on May 18, 1871 on Salt Creek Prairie in Texas, along with Satank, Satanta, Mamanti, Tsen-tainte (White Horse), Ado-ete (Big Tree), Fast Bear, Yellow Wolf, Eagle Head.

But Satanta, while asking the Indian Agent on the Kiowa-Comanche Reservation for ammunition and supplies, bragged that he had led the war party at Salt Creek Prairie, and told him that Satank and young war leader Ado-ete (Big Tree) were there too; he didn't mention the names of Mamanti, Tsen-tainte (White Horse), Fast Bear, Yellow Wolf, Eagle Head, so they weren't arrested.

On April 20, 1872 Zepko-ete and Tsen-tainte, with about one hundred of their Kiowa warriors and Comanche allies, attacked a government wagon train at Howard Wells station, along the San Antonio - El Paso trail, killing 17 Mexicans and kidnapping a woman; two companies (A and H) of 9th Cavalry from Fort Clark, led by capt. N. Cooney and lt. F. R. Vincent, got the Indians, but were forced to retreat after suffering two casualties (lt. Vincent himself, deadly wounded, and a "Buffalo Soldier"; ten Indians (four in the assault on the wagon train and six in the fight against the "Buffalo Soldiers") were reported to have been killed.

Big Bow joined Guipago and the Comanche under Quanah and made a name for himself in the Comanche Campaign and the Red River War; he was one of the last to surrender (following Tene-angopte's advice), in January 1875, to the United States, before Guipago's surrendering on February 25, 1875.

Committed to anti-colonial ideals and the path of violent resistance, Big Bow refused to sign the Treaty of Medicine Lodge in 1867, which relocated the Kiowa and Comanche to live together on a reservation in western Oklahoma and Texas. Big Bow also participated in the Second Battle of Adobe Walls, a failed attempt to push out settlers hunting buffalo on their tribal lands. Thomas Battey, a Quaker missionary close to the tribe, commented on his ferocious countenance. When the Kiowas were forced onto their reservation in 1875, Tene-angopte did not include Big Bow in the number of Kiowa chiefs and warriors to be deported to Fort Marion, Florida, and Big Bow and his family settled near Rainy Mountain in Indian Territory.

== See also ==
- Dohasan
- Satank
- Guipago
- Satanta
- Mamanti
- Tene-angopte
- Tsen-tainte
- Ado-ete
