= White Horse (Kiowa leader) =

Native American Kiowa warrior (1847–1892)

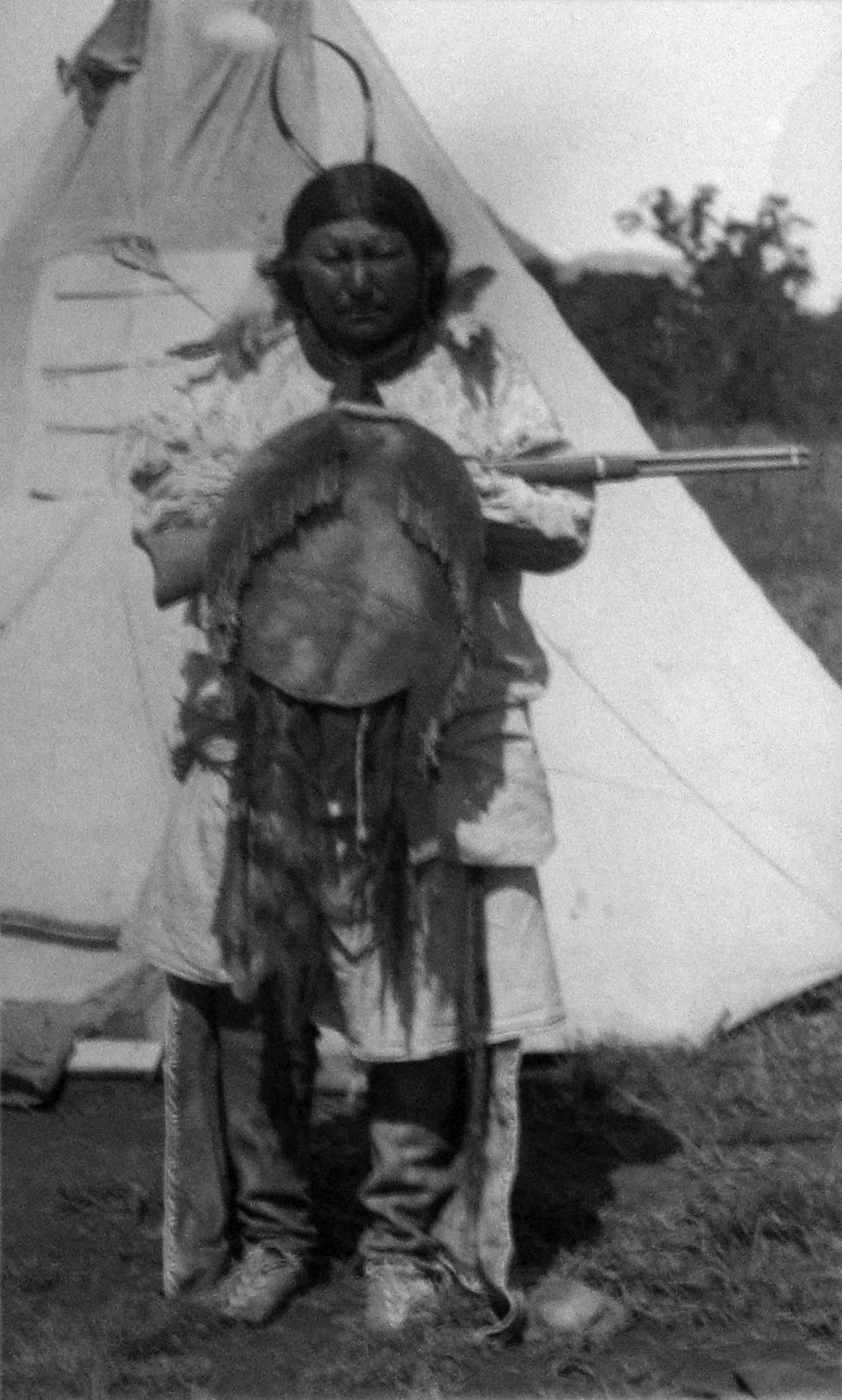
White Horse holding his war shield

Tsêñt’àiñ:dè or White Horse (unknown c. 1840/1845–1892) was a chief of the Kiowa. White Horse attended the council between southern plains tribes and the United States at Medicine Lodge in southern Kansas which resulted in the Medicine Lodge Treaty. Despite his attendance at the treaty signing he conducted frequent raids upon other tribes and white settlers. Follower of such elders as Guipago, Satanta and old Satank, he was often associated with Big Tree (or Á:dàuiétd̶è).

In 1867 White Horse joined a war party of Comanches and Kiowas on a revenge raid against the Navajos, who were then living in exile on the reservation near Fort Sumner, New Mexico.

On June 12, 1870, White Horse led a raiding party on an attack on Fort Sill in Indian Territory and stole seventy-three mules. On June 22 in an attack on a cattle drive on the Chisolm Trail, White Horse killed and scalped two men, prior to the arrival of a cavalry detachment which drove them off.

White Horse

On July 9, 1870, the Kiowa Indians made a raid into Montague County, Texas. They scattered a herd of cattle, killed two yoke of oxen, stole nine horses, one mule, a large amount of provisions, one tent, one wagon-cover, etc., all of which property was at the time owned by and in the possession of Colonel Samuel Newitt Wood.

In a raid on August 7, 1870, in Montague County, they killed German immigrant farmer, Gottlieb Koozier, and took his wife and five children captive along with fourteen-year-old Martin Kilgore; the family was ransomed for $100 each at Fort Sill. Quaker Indian agent Lawrie Tatum bargained upon behalf of the hostages, not paying until they were all returned. White Horse took part in many raids, including the Warren Wagon Train Raid, on May 11, 1871, on Salt Creek Prairie in Texas, along with Satank, Satanta, Big Bow, Mamanti, Big Tree (and, perhaps, Guipago himself), but he wasn't arrested nor involved in the trial in Jacksboro. On April 20, 1872, Big Bow and Tsêñt’àiñ:dè, with about one hundred of their Kiowa warriors and Comanche allies, attacked a government wagon train at Howard Wells station, along the San Antonio - El Paso trail, killing 17 Mexicans and kidnapping a woman; two companies (A and H) of 9th Cavalry from Fort Clark, led by capt. N. Cooney and lt. F. R. Vincent, got the Indians, but were forced to retreat after suffering two casualties (lt. Vincent himself, deadly wounded, and a "Buffalo Soldier"); ten Indians (four in the assault on the wagon train and six in the fight against the "Buffalo Soldiers") were reported to have been killed. After Adobe Walls' fight, in June 1874, he joined Guipago and the Comanche under Quanah in the Red River War. The raiding would continue until April 19, 1875, when he and his band surrendered at Fort Sill.

When forced by General Philip Sheridan to choose those among his tribe to be imprisoned in the east, White Horse was among those chosen by Kicking Bird (T’è:néáungopd̶e). He would join other Kiowa as well as tribe members of the Comanche, Caddo, Southern Cheyenne and Arapaho imprisoned at Fort Marion in St. Augustine, Florida. While incarcerated at Fort Marion, White Horse was among the prisoners who became artists in what would be called Ledger Art, for the ledgers they were drawn in. In 1878 he and the other Kiowa prisoners were returned to the reservation in Indian Territory near Fort Sill.

== See also ==
- Second Battle of Adobe Walls
- List of Native American artists
- Visual arts by indigenous peoples of the Americas
- Warren Wagon Train Raid
- Guipago
- Satanta
- Satank
- Tene-angopte
- Zepko-ete
- Mamanti
- Ado-ete
