= First Battle of Adobe Walls =

1864 battle in the American Indian Wars

- Part of the American Indian Wars, Apache Wars
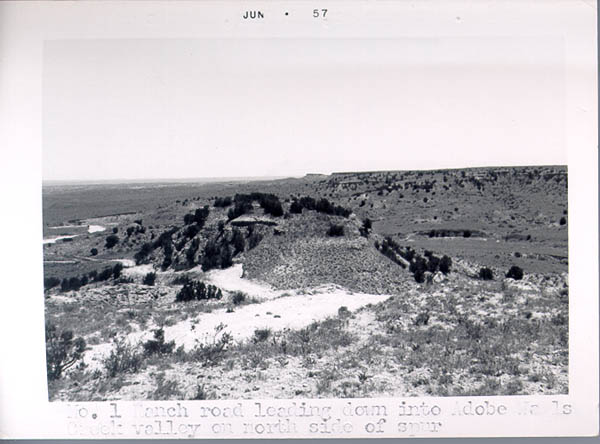
- Adobe Walls
Date	November 25, 1864
Location	Hutchinson County, Texas 35°53′37.2588″N 101°9′43.36″W
Result	Inconclusive

Belligerents
United States	Comanche; Kiowa; Plains Apache

Commanders and leaders
(United States) Kit Carson	Dohäsan, Guipago, Satank, Satanta

Strength
335 soldiers 72 Native American Scouts; 2 artillery pieces	<1,400 warriors

Casualties and losses
6 killed 25 wounded	60 killed and wounded
- Location within Texas

The First Battle of Adobe Walls took place between the United States Army and Native Americans. The Kiowa, Comanche and Plains Apache (Kiowa Apache) tribes drove from the battlefield a United States column that was responding to attacks on white settlers moving into the Southwest. The battle on November 25, 1864, resulted in light casualties on both sides.

== Background ==
The Battle of Adobe Walls occurred on November 25, 1864, in the vicinity of Adobe Walls, the ruins of William Bent's abandoned adobe trading post and saloon, located on the northern side of the Canadian River 17 miles (27 km) northeast of present-day Stinnett in Hutchinson County. The battle came about when General James Henry Carleton, commander of the military District of New Mexico, decided to punish severely the plains tribes of the Kiowa and Comanche, whom he deemed responsible for attacks on wagon trains on the Santa Fe Trail. The Indians saw the wagon trains as trespassers who killed buffalo and other game the Indians needed to survive. As the American Civil War drained available troops, attacks on the Great Plains worsened, leading in the later part of 1863 to cries from settlers for protection.

Carleton wanted to put an end to the raids, or at least to send a sharp signal to the Indians that the Civil War had not left the United States unable to protect its people. He selected Colonel Kit Carson to lead the expeditionary force as the most seasoned veteran Indian fighter at his disposal. Carson took command of the 1st Regiment New Mexico Volunteer Cavalry, with orders to proceed against the winter campgrounds of the Comanches and Kiowas, which were reported to be somewhere in the Palo Duro Canyon of the southern Panhandle area, on the south side of the Canadian River. The Carson expedition was the second invasion of the heart of the Comancheria, after the Antelope Hills expedition.

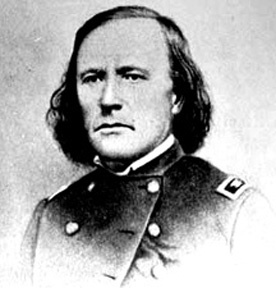
Kit Carson as Colonel of 1st Regiment New Mexico Volunteer Cavalry

=== Prelude ===
On November 10, 1864, Carson started from Fort Bascom with 260 cavalry, 75 infantry and 72 Ute and Jicarilla Apache scouts that he had recruited from Lucien Maxwell's ranch near Cimarron, New Mexico. On November 12 Carson's force, accompanied by two mountain howitzers under the command of Lieutenant George H. Pettis, 27 wagons, an ambulance and with 45 days rations, proceeded down the Canadian River into the Texas Panhandle. Carson had decided to march first to Adobe Walls, which he was familiar with from his employment there by Bent more than 20 years earlier. Carson, long familiar with the Utes and Jicarillas, had confidence in his Indian scouts. They covered his flanks and each morning two of them rode far ahead of the slow-moving column to search for Comanche and Kiowa encampments.

Inclement weather, including an early snowstorm, slowed progress. On November 24 the 1st Cavalry reached Mule Springs in Moore County, approximately 30 miles (48 km) west of Adobe Walls. That same afternoon the Indian scouts reported they had found the trail of a large Indian village. Carson left his infantry behind to guard his supply train and ordered a night march of cavalry and artillery. He rode in the van with the Utes and Jicarillas. Next morning he ordered the two howitzers forward to join him in the van. Coming to the easily fordable Canadian River, he deployed one company of cavalry on the north side of the river and continued with the remainder on the south side.

== Battle ==
Approximately two hours after daybreak on November 25, Carson's cavalry found and attacked a Kiowa village of 176 lodges. The chief Dohäsan and his people fled, passing the alarm to allied Comanche villages nearby; Guipago led the warriors to protect the fleeing women and children. Marching forward to Adobe Walls, four miles from the Kiowa village, Carson dug in there about 10:00 am, using one corner of the ruins for a hospital. He discovered to his dismay that there were numerous villages in the area, including a large Comanche village. Carson saw large numbers of Indians pouring forward to engage him in battle, a much greater force than he had expected. Pettis, who wrote the most complete report of the battle, estimated that 1,200–1,400 Comanche and Kiowa attacked the soldiers and Indian scouts who numbered 330 (75 men had been left behind to guard the supply train).

Throw a few shells into that crowd over there.

— Kit Carson to artillery officer Lt. Pettis

Carson dismounted his cavalry and deployed them around the two howitzers. His Indian scouts skirmished with about 200 Comanche and Kiowa warriors "mounted and covered with paint and feathers ... charging backwards and forwards ... their bodies thrown over the sides of their horses, at a full run, and shooting occasionally under their horses." Dohäsan, assisted by Satank, Guipago and Satanta, led the Kiowas in the first attack. Fierce fighting developed as the Kiowa, Plains Apache and Comanche warriors repeatedly attacked Carson's position. Satanta replied to Carson's bugler with his own bugle calls to confuse the soldiers. Carson succeeded in repelling the attacks only through his clever use of supporting fire from the twin howitzers. The first shells from the howitzers caused the Comanche and Kiowa to retire from the battlefield, but they soon returned in even greater numbers and renewed the attack.

By afternoon Pettis estimated Carson's army faced more than 3,000 Indians. After six to eight hours of fairly continuous fighting, Carson realized he was running low on howitzer shells and ammunition in general, and he ordered his forces to retreat to the Kiowa village in his rear. Carson was also concerned about the fate of the 75 men guarding his much-needed supply train. The Indians tried to block his retreat by setting fire to the grass and brush down near the river. The wily Carson, however, set backfires and retreated to higher ground, where the twin howitzers continued to hold off the Indians. When twilight came, Carson ordered about half his command and his Indian scouts to burn the lodges of the village, which also resulted in the death of the Kiowa Apache chief Iron Shirt, who refused to leave his tipi. The soldiers confiscated many "finely finished buffalo robes" and burned the rest, and the Indian scouts killed and mutilated four Kiowas too decrepit to flee. The weary soldiers continued their retreat and found their supply train intact that night.

Carson and his soldiers rested in camp on November 26, their Indian opponents visible on a hilltop about two miles away. Carson's Indian scouts skirmished with the Comanche and Kiowa, but no serious attack was mounted on the soldiers. The next day Carson gave the order to return to New Mexico. Some of his officers wished to renew the battle, but Carson, consulting only with his Utes and Jicarillas, ordered the retreat to New Mexico.

== Aftermath ==
=== Declaration of victory ===
The United States Army declared the First Battle of Adobe Walls a victory. The Kiowa, to the contrary, recorded in their annual record, painted on buffalo skin, that the period was "muddy travel winter, the time when the Kiowas repelled Kit Carson." Carson was well known by all the Indians of the Southern Plains. The battle left the Comanche and Kiowa unchallenged in their control of the Texas Panhandle until the Battle of the North Fork of the Red River eight years later.

Most authorities believe that Carson's decision to retreat was wise and that he deserves credit for a good defense. He was outnumbered, and only his clever use of backfires and the howitzers prevented his force from being overrun and killed as Custer was twelve years later at the Little Bighorn. The number of Indians engaged against Carson in this battle has been estimated as high as 3,000, but that is likely an exaggeration. (Note: The combined number of warriors possessed by the Comanche and their allies probably did not total 3,000. In 1869, five years after the battle, the total population of the Comanche, Kiowa and Kiowa Apache was estimated to be 6,565, of which not more than one-fourth, or about 1,600, would be adult males.) As the Kiowa village consisted of 176 lodges and the Comanche village of about 500 lodges, it is unlikely that the total Indian force numbered more than two fighting men per lodge or 1,300.

As it was, Carson left six dead and 25 wounded, including one Indian scout killed and four wounded, while he estimated that the Comanche and Kiowa suffered approximately 50–60 deaths and as many as 100 wounded. The official U.S. Army report on the battle, however, estimated an Indian loss of a total of 60 killed and wounded. Given the long-distance nature of the fighting estimates of Indian casualties cannot be verified. Only one Comanche scalp was reported taken by Carson's soldiers.

=== Epilogue ===
The First Battle at Adobe Walls would be the last time the Comanche and Kiowa forced American troops to retreat from a battlefield, and it marked the beginning of the end of the plains tribes and their way of life. A decade later the Second Battle of Adobe Walls was fought on June 27, 1874, between 250 and 700 Comanche and a group of 28 hunters defending the settlement of Adobe Walls. After a four-day siege, the Indians withdrew. The Second Battle is historically significant because it led to the Red River War of 1874–75, resulting in the final relocation of the Southern Plains Indians to reservations in what is now Oklahoma.

=== Historical marker ===
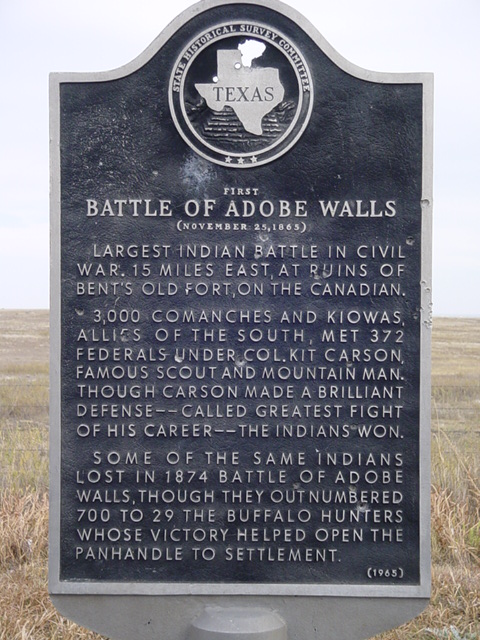
Historical Marker for First Battle of Adobe Walls 35°53′32.157″N 101°26′51.06″W

In 1964 the Texas State Historical Survey Committee erected Historical Marker 1690 to preserve the memory of the First Battle of Adobe Walls. The marker is not located at the actual battle site but rather 15 miles (24 km) to the west. The marker states that "though Carson made a brilliant defense, the Indians won."

== See also ==
- Battle of Apache Pass
- Second Battle of Adobe Walls
