= Guipago =

Chief of the Kiowa (1820–1879)

- G̶ûib̶à:gàui (Lone Wolf)
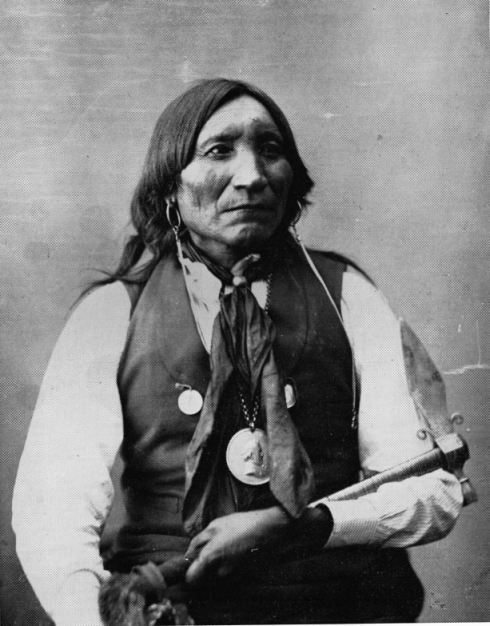
- Guipago (Lone Wolf), Principal Kiowa Chief of the Kiowa Tribe. Medal was presented to Chief Guipago by President Buchanan.
- Born: c. 1820
- Died: July 1879 (aged 58–59); Fort Sill, Indian Territory (now Fort Sill, Oklahoma)
- Resting place: near Mount Scott (Wichita Mountains), Oklahoma
- Known for: A chief of the Kiowa Nation, warrior, orator
- Relatives: Chief Dohäsan (Uncle)

Guipago or Lone Wolf the Elder (Kiowa: G̶ûib̶à:gàui, lit. ''Lone Wolf" or "Alone among the Wolves'' ; c. 1820 – July 1879) was the last Principal Chief of the Kiowa tribe. He was a member of the Koitsenko, the Kiowa warrior elite, and was a signer of the Little Arkansas Treaty in 1865.

== Background ==
The Kiowa flourished as nomadic hunters in the early 19th Century. In 1863 Lone Wolf (Guipago), accompanied Yellow Wolf, Yellow Buffalo, Little Heart, and White Face Buffalo Calf; two Kiowa women Coy and Etla; and the Indian agent, Samuel G. Colley, to Washington D. C. to establish a policy that would favor the Kiowa, but it was a futile attempt.

In the Little Arkansas Treaty of 1865, Dohasan, the last Chief of the unified Kiowa, signed the peace treaty along with Guipago, or Lone Wolf (the Elder), and other chiefs. Dohasan scorned the peace policy because he knew there would be no more buffalo in Kiowa hunting grounds and Guipago also knew the Kiowas could not live without buffalo hunts. In the following years Guipago, along with Satanta (White Bear), old Satank (Sitting Bear), the leader of Koitsenko Warrior Society, Zepko-ete (Big Bow), Manyi-ten (Woman's Heart), Set-imkia (Stumbling Bear), Aupia-goodle (Red Otter), Tsen-tainte (White Horse), Ado-ete (Big Tree) led many raids in Texas and Oklahoma, and in Mexico too, playing his very important role as political antagonist of Tene-angopte (Kicking Bird)'s appeasement politics.

On October 21, 1867, Guipago did not sign or vote in favor of the Medicine Lodge Treaty. The treaty led to the United States taking possession of 2,001,933 acres of the Kiowa, Comanche, and Plains Apache (Kataka) Reservation. This does not include the 23,000 acres of the Fort Sill Military Reservation. The Medicine Lodge Treaty placed the Kiowa on a reservation in western Oklahoma and the government supervised the activities of the Kiowa. In 1868, General Phillip Sheridan planned to wipe out the Plains Indians, thus, Colonel George A. Custer moved onto the valley of the upper Washita River in December 1868.

== Political career ==
In the winter of 1866, Dohasan, the leader of the Kiowa for more than 30 years, died. Guipago (Gui-pah-gho, Lone Wolf), was chosen by the Kiowa people to represent them in Washington, DC. After Salt Creek massacre of the "Warren wagon-train", occurred on May 18, 1871, Satanta having foolishly bragged of his, Satank (Sitting Bear), and Ado-ete (Big Tree)’s involvement of the raid, gen. William T. Sherman personally issued orders to Col. Ranald S. Mackenzie to arrest all three of them, but not Mamante (Sky Walker), Zepko-ete (Big Bow), Tsen-tainte (White Horse), and some others, whose names were not mentioned (among them, likely Guipago too); Guipago came in, well equipped to fight (ready to fire his loaded rifles and his guns), and tried unsuccessfully, in front of the massive presence of military troops, to prevent their arrest (May 27); Satank was killed along the way to Jacksboro, and Satanta and Ado-ete in 1871 were sentenced to Huntsville prison because of an assault against the wagon-train. After a long and hard dealing with the U.S. Government officers (finally Guipago told the Commissioner that he must consult with Satanta and Ado-ete), in 1872 (Sept. 29) Guipago was allowed to meet his friend Satanta and the young war chief Ado-ete in St. Louis, and only after this he accepted to go to Washington with some other Kiowa, Comanche, Cheyenne, Arapaho, Wichita and Delaware chiefs and talk about peace with President Ulysses S. Grant; after Satanta and Ado-ete were temporarily paroled, Guipago led the Kiowa delegation to Washington in September 1872, and got Indian Commissioner E.P. Smith's promise to release the two captives; Guipago was told in Washington the Kiowa had to camp ten miles near Fort Sill by December 15, 1872, and he agreed under condition that the two captive chiefs were turned back to their people; so Guipago gained the release of Satanta and Ado-ete by promising that his tribe would remain at peace; Guipago returned a hero. Satanta and Ado-ete were definitively released only in September 1873, Guipago having made clear to Indian agent James M. Haworth that his patience was now at its end.

== Fight near Fort Clark and Tau-ankia and Gui-tan death ==
That same year, his son and nephew were killed near Fort Clark by a troop of 4th Cavalry while coming back from Mexico with a raiding party which went after horses taken by a big horse-stealing of white thieves. Tau-ankia was the only son of Guipago (Lone Wolf), and was considered an On-de (favored) by his family. Guitan, a boy of 15, tried to save Tau-ankia but both were killed. Long Horn returned to hide the bodies secretly. News of the deaths reached the Kiowa camps January 13, 1874. The tribe mourned the loss of the two popular young men. Guitan was the son of Aupia-goodle (Red Otter), and Guipago's favorite nephew. In May 1874 Guipago and his brother Aupia-goodle went to rescue their sons' bodies, but a cavalry troop from Fort Concho forced them to abandon the corpses.

During 1873, Guipago (Lone Wolf) became again feared throughout the Southern Plains; he joined Quanah Parker and his Comanche in their attack on Anglo buffalo hunters at Adobe Walls and fought the Army to a standstill at the Anadarko Agency on August 22, 1874. He fought the Texas Rangers at Lost Valley, and the U.S. Cavalry at Palo Duro Canyon. He was also present during the Battle of the Upper Washita. With the buffalo gone, he and his people surrendered in February 1875.

== Death and legacy ==
In 1875 upon surrendering with his band, Guipago (Lone Wolf) was among a group of 27 Kiowa singled out by Tene-angopte on order of the U.S. Army for incarceration at Fort Marion in St. Augustine, Florida, where he would remain until 1879. He was found guilty of rebellion and sentenced to confinement in the dungeons of old Fort Marion at St. Augustine, Florida, and vulnerable to malaria and measles. Guipago contracted malaria during his imprisonment at Fort Marion and was sent home in 1879 to live out his days. He died in July 1879. Guipago is buried in the Wichita Mountains in an unknown location, in the Mount Scott area.

Before his death in 1879 Guipago (Lone Wolf) passed his name to a younger warrior named Mamay-day-te, who became the Elk Creek Lone Wolf. The younger Lone Wolf and his followers lived in the more isolated northern part of the reserve, near Mt. Scott of Lone Wolf "the Elder", and along Elk and Rainy Mountain creeks. He subsequently led Kiowa resistance to government influence on the reservation. Lone Wolf the Younger led a group of warriors to recover the bodies and to avenge their deaths.

Guipago's demise as the leading warrior in the words of ethnologist James Mooney, "is the end of the war history of the Kiowa." About the same time other Kiowa war leaders also died crippling the leadership at a crucial time in Kiowa history.

== Lonewolf Song 1st Gourd Dance Song ==
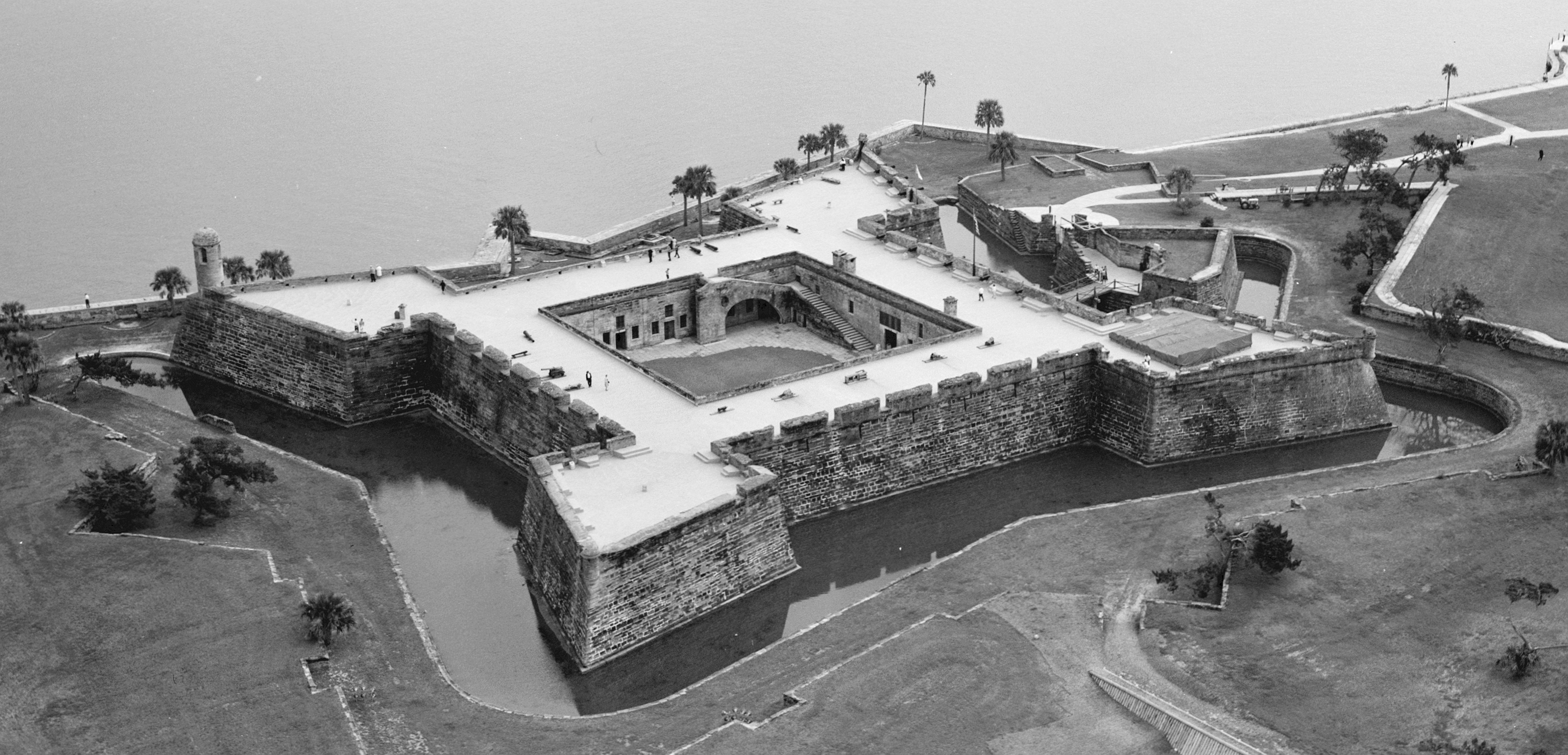
Fort Marion where Guipago and other hostile Kiowa were sent for incarceration.

Kooey pah' gaw
Daw onh daw-geath
Day tay dow tigh dow
Koy keah kom' bah
Naw daw tigh dow
Tay dow tigh dow hey

Chief Lonewolf gave us this one song,
It's with all of us,
That song is with all the Kiowas,
It's for all of us.

Cúifà:gàu
dáu á̠u: dáu:gà
dè jé: dáu táidò:
Cáuiqácô̠bàu
nàu dáu táidò:
jé: dáu táidò: he

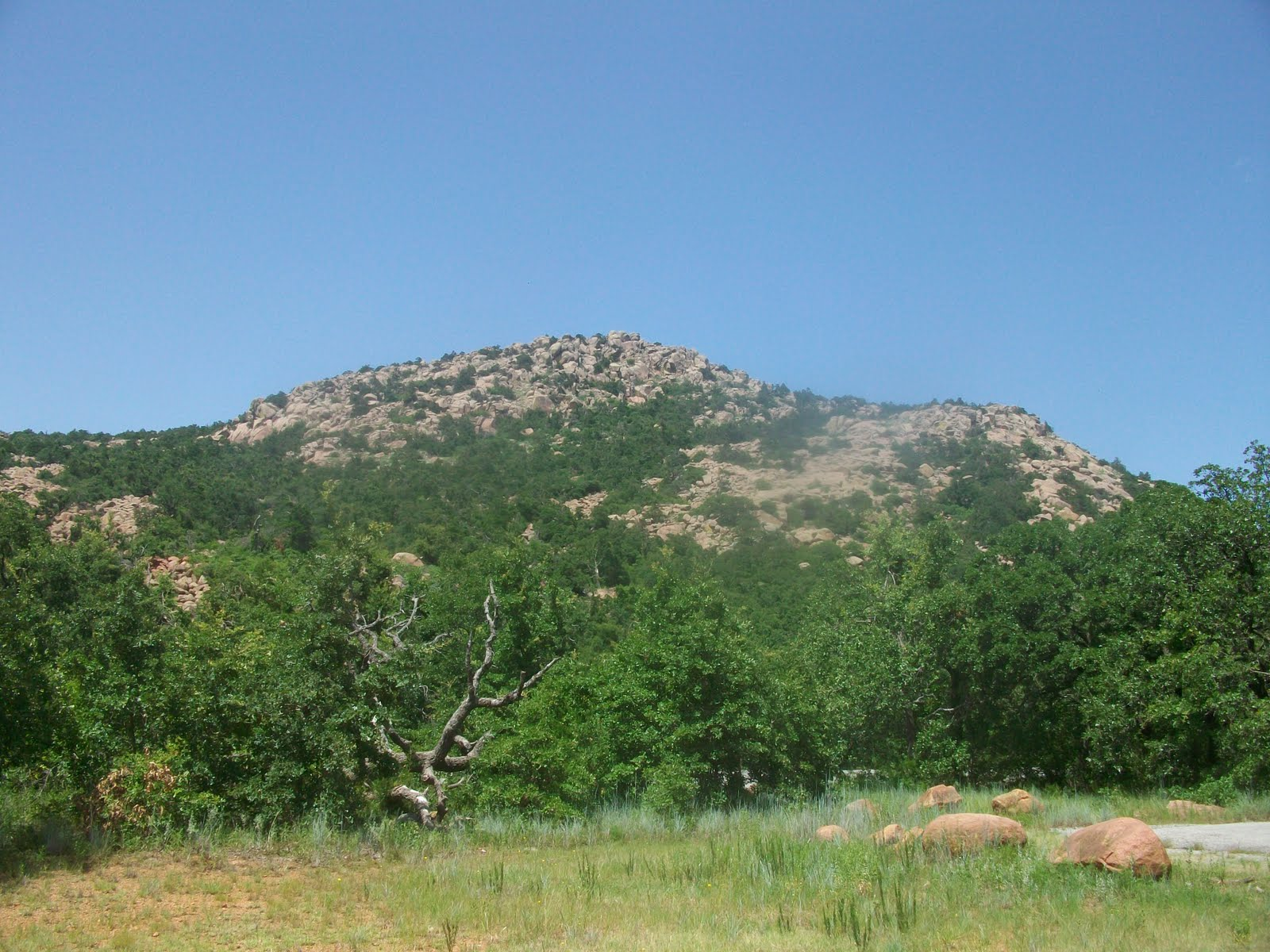
Mount Scott area, in the Wichita Mountains, where Guipago was buried in a secret place

== Current ==
In 1996 the Old Chief Lone Wolf Descendants created a historical organization in honor of Old Chief Lone Wolf, Gui-pah-gho, The Elder, to remember him as a man of peace, a recognized council leader, an elite warrior, a Sun Dancer, a Kiowa father, and a great Chief of the Kiowa people who fought for the Kiowas' homeland. A memorial bust of Old Chief Lone Wolf-Guipahgo was dedicated at the Kiowa Tribal Complex in Carnegie, OK, on May 27, 2000. The bust is on display at the Ft. Sill Army Museum at Ft. Sill, Oklahoma.

== See also ==
- First Battle of Adobe Walls
- Second Battle of Adobe Walls
- Red River War
- Texas-Indian Wars
- Warren Wagon Train Raid
- Ado-ete
- Mamanti
- Satanta
- Tsen-tainte
- Zepko-ete
