= Warren Wagon Train raid =

1871 attack

Date	May 18, 1871
Location	Salt Creek Prairie, Texas 33°12′54.5″N 98°28′54.7″W
Result	Native American victory

Belligerents
Kiowa; Comanche	United States

Commanders and leaders
Satanta; Satank; Maman-ti; Big Tree; White Horse; Eagle Heart; Big Bow; Yellow Wolf; Fast Bear	Henry Warren

Strength
150	12

Casualties and losses
3	7 wagon runners killed
- Location within Texas

The Warren Wagon Train raid, also known as the Salt Creek massacre, occurred on May 18, 1871. Henry Warren was contracted to haul supplies to forts in the west of Texas, including Fort Richardson, Fort Griffin, and Fort Concho. Traveling down the Jacksboro-Belknap road heading towards Salt Creek Crossing, they encountered William Tecumseh Sherman. Less than an hour after encountering the famous General, they spotted a rather large group of riders ahead. They quickly realized that these were Native American warriors, probably Kiowa and/or Comanche.

The corn train quickly shifted into a ring formation, and all the mules were put into the center of the ring. The warriors destroyed the corn supplies, killing seven of the wagon runners and mutilating their bodies. Five men managed to escape, one of which was Thomas Brazeale who reached Fort Richardson on foot, some 20 miles away. As soon as Col. Ranald S. Mackenzie learned of the incident, he informed Sherman. Sherman and Mackenzie searched for the warriors responsible for the raid. In the end, notwithstanding the intervention of Guipago (Lone Wolf), well equipped with loaded rifles and revolvers and ready to fight, three of the war leaders involved were arrested at Fort Sill: Satanta (White Bear), Satank (Sitting Bear), and Ado-ete (Big Tree). Satank attempted to escape and was killed while traveling to Fort Richardson for trial. The other two were tried and convicted of murder.

== Raids ==
Many of the Native American warriors came from the Fort Sill Reservation in Indian Territory, confident that they could terrorize Texas and escape to safety across the Red River, which was another legal jurisdiction. The ambush had been planned by a large band of Kiowa warriors, approximately 180 warriors, under the leadership of Satanta, Satank, Mamanti, Big Tree, White Horse, Fast Bear, Yellow Wolf, and Eagle Heart. Hidden in a thicket of scrub in the Salt Creek Prairie, they observed the slow approach of General William Tecumseh Sherman's inspection retinue of approx 18 men. Although the Kiowa war party outnumbered the US Army troop by ten to one, they did not attack, maybe because the Army troopers would have inflicted too many casualties.

The Kiowa story is that the previous night, Mamanti ("He Walking-above"), the shaman, had prophesied that this small party would be followed by a larger one with more plunder for the taking. The braves were rewarded three hours later when 10 mule-drawn wagons filled with army corn and fodder trundled into view. The Kiowa attacked and quickly overwhelmed this convoy. Seven muleskinners were killed, while five managed to escape.

One of the mule skinners was tortured to death with fire by the Kiowa, his tongue cut out. The warriors lost three of their own but left with 40 mules heavily laden with supplies. It was well after dark before the white survivors reached the nearby Fort Richardson and told their harrowing tale to the very officer whose party had passed unharmed under the Kiowa guns, General Sherman, who ordered the arrests of the Indian war chiefs at Fort Sill. Satank was killed in the train as he tried to escape the column of United States soldiers. Satanta and Big Tree became the first Indians to be tried in a US court. At the trial of Satanta and Big Tree, Satanta and Big Tree were convicted of murder on 5–6 July in Jack County, Texas. They were paroled two years later thanks to the steady behavior adopted by Guipago in his dealing with the government agents, and were sent back to their people.

== Historical markers ==
=== Texas roadside marker ===
The site of the Warren Wagon Train raid received a historic marker in 1977 which is 1.5 miles west of the actual location.

=== Texas centennial marker ===
A Texas Centennial Marker was placed at the actual location of the attack. The marker is a white granite oblisque surrounded by a low steel rail fence and was put in place in 1936. The inscription is a follows.

BURIED HERE are the remains of seven teamsters, Nathan S. Long, N.J. Baxter, Jesse Bowman, James S and Samuel E. Elliott, James and Thomas Williams. Employed by Henry Warren, Government contractor, who were slain by Indians under Satana, Satank, and Big Tree. Kiowa and Comanche chiefs. On May 18, 1871 while hauling forage between Jacksboro and Fort Griffin.

=== Original monument ===
Capt. Henry Warren erected a nicely painted wooden monument where the raid occurred. It has long since disappeared. The following is transcribed from a journal entry of M. K. Kellogg's Texas Journal, 1872. Kellogg transcribed the inscription on the original monument. (See image in gallery)

9TH SEPT. MOND. 10:25 A.M. Came to Monument to 7 men massacred—50 yds left of road 18 May 1871 - - - Inscribed as follows: Sacred to the memory of seven brave men killed by Indians at this place on Thurs. May 18 ’71 while in discharge of their duty defending their train against 150 Comanche Indians. N. S. Song—Wagon master. Teamsters: J. S. Elliott, Sam Elliott, N. J. Baxter, Jas Williams, John Mullins, Jesse Bowman.

=== Young County historical tour ===
This is a bronze plaque located on Monument Rd 0.5 miles due north of the hill that the Indians hid behind prior to the attack.

=== Marker map ===
A map showing the location of the markers is available in external references.

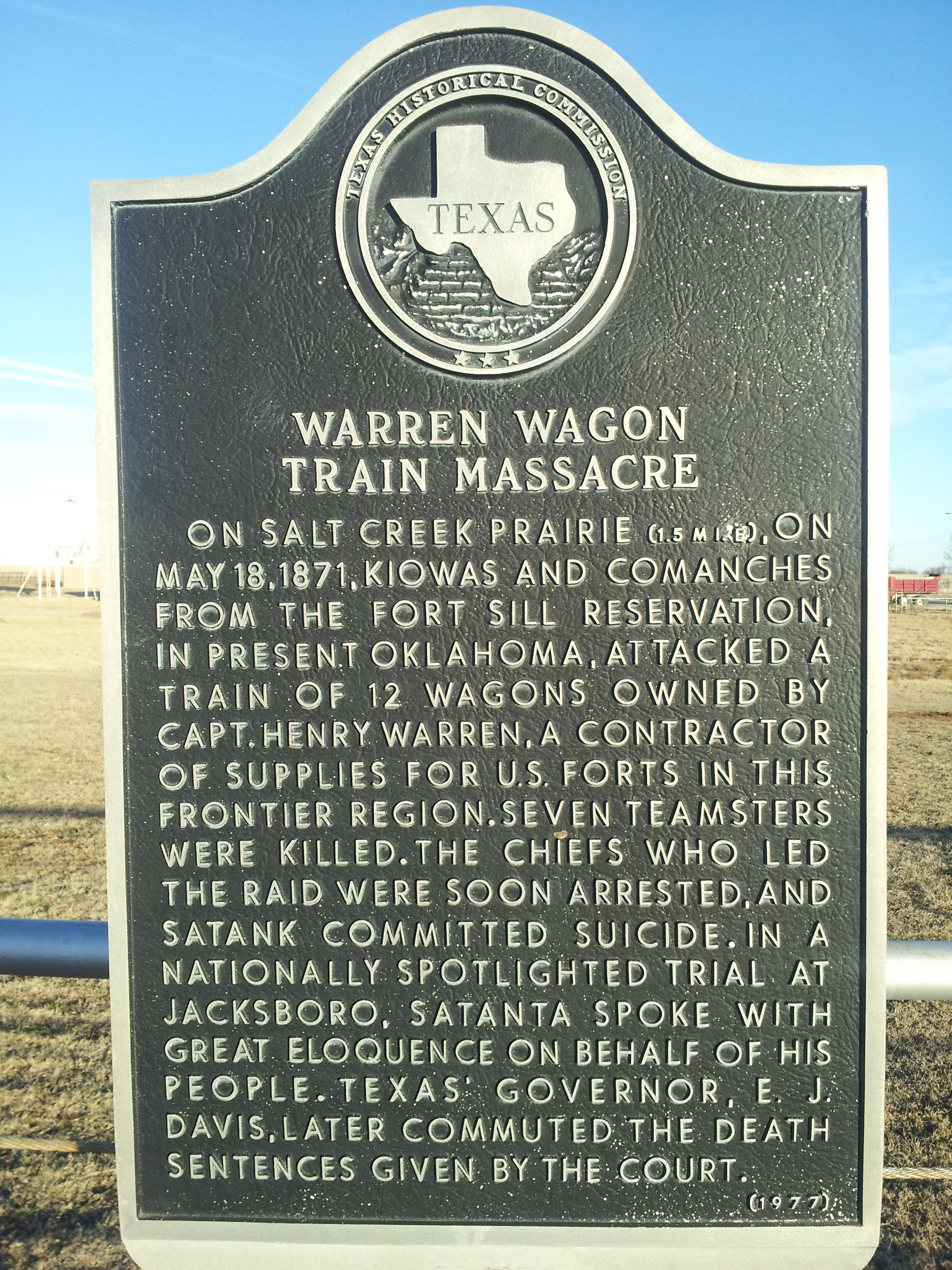
Warren Wagon Train Massacre Texas Historical Marker

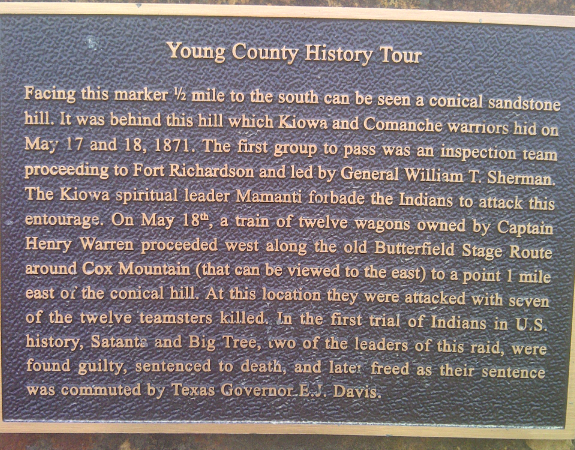
Marker describing the attack and exact location

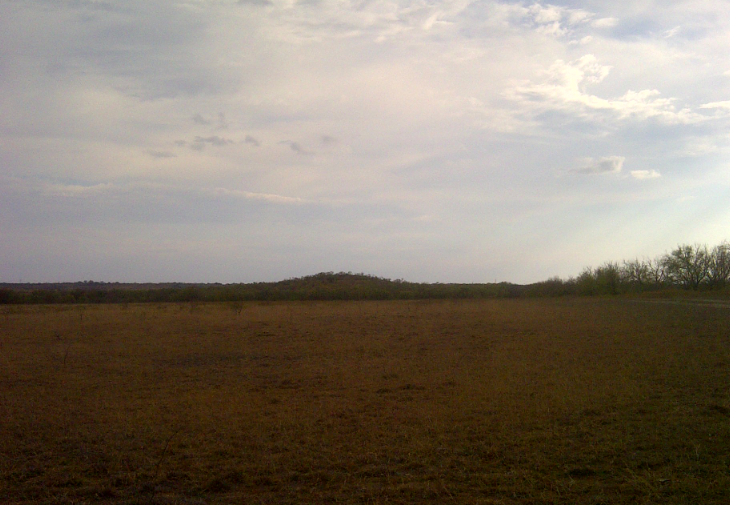
Hill where the Indians hid before the attack

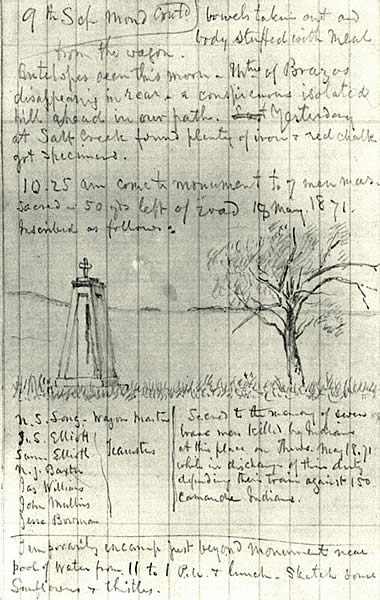
Sketch created in 1871 of original marker showing location of wooden monument erected at the location of the massacre

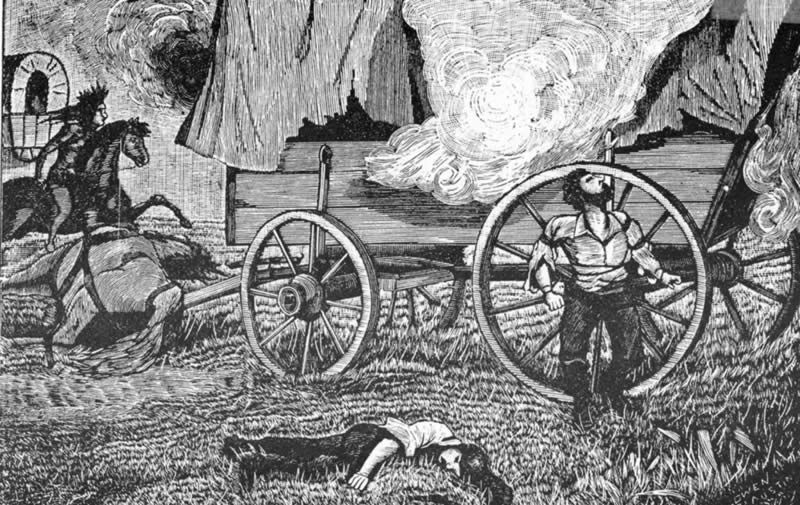
Artist's rendition of the scene of the massacre from 1871
