= James M. Haworth =

James Mahlon Haworth (November 19, 1831 – March 12, 1885) was a United States Army major, an Indian agent, and the first Superintendent of Indian Schools in the United States.

== Biography ==
Haworth, a Quaker, was born in Wilmington, Ohio, and studied at Earlham School in Richmond, Indiana and Haverford College. He died in Albuquerque, New Mexico.

== Career ==
Haworth took over as Indian agent at Fort Gibson in 1873 after Lawrie Tatum resigned as the Indian agent for the Comanche, Kiowa, and Wichita Reservation on March 31, 1873. He was a U.S. Indian Inspector from 1879, and was made the first Indian School Superintendent when the 47th U.S. Congress created the position in 1883 (Session II, Chap. 61). Mathew Brady's photographic studio in Washington D.C. captured an image of Haworth.

He selected the site for the Chilocco Indian School during the administration of president James Garfield and its Haworth Hall was named for him.
