= Isatai'i =

Comanche warrior and medicine man (c. 1840 – 1916)

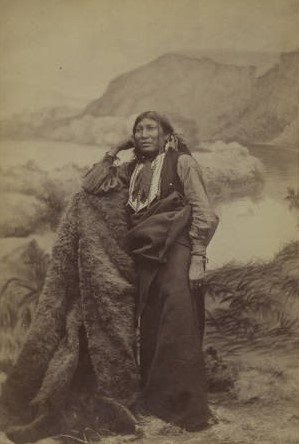
Isatai'i, Comanche warrior and medicine man. Reservation cabinet card photo created and published by W. P. Bliss around 1880. Collection of the DeGolyer Library, Southern Methodist University

Isatai'i, also known as Isatai, or Eschiti (Comanche: Isataiʔi, lit. 'Wolf Vulva'; c. 1840 – 1916) was a Comanche warrior and medicine man of the Kwaharʉ band. Originally named Quenatosavit (Comanche: Kwihnai Tosaabitʉ; lit. 'White Eagle'), after the debacle at Adobe Walls on June 27, 1874, he was renamed Isatai'i. Isatai'i gained enormous prominence for a brief period in 1873-74 as a prophet and "messiah" of Native Americans. He succeeded, albeit temporarily, in uniting the autonomous Comanche bands as no previous Chief or leader had ever done. Indeed, his prestige was such that he was able to organize what was said to be the first Comanche sun dance, a ritual that his tribe had not previously adopted.

== Early life ==
Not much is known about Kwihnai Tosaabitʉ youth. He was born a Kwaharʉ Comanche, a few years before Quanah Parker, probably about 1840. As an adult he became a medicine man, not a traditional warrior. He first came into prominence right before the Second Battle of Adobe Walls as he preached a Messianic War against buffalo hunters and other whites he feared were ending the Comanche way of life. Kwihnai Tosaabitʉ prophecies were based on his claim that he had ascended far above the earth into the clouds and had conversed with the Great Spirit. He claimed the Great Spirit had granted him extraordinary powers. Among these powers were the ability to cure the sick, bring the dead back to life, to control the weather and other natural phenomena, and to make bullets fall to the ground, harming no one. He claimed that he could belch up bullets and cartridges and re-swallow them. He correctly predicted the disappearance of the comet in 1873, and also correctly predicted a drought that year—predictions that solidified his status as a miracle worker, prophet, and medicine man.

== Preparing for the Second Battle of Adobe Walls ==
Kwihnai Tosaabitʉ brought all the bands of the Comanches together for the sun dance in May 1874. At the sun dance, he began preaching a war of revenge and extermination, and told the warriors they would be invulnerable to their enemies. Comanche history says that Kwihnai Tosaabitʉ's hatred of the whites was motivated by the deaths of family members at their hands.

It is notable that members of other tribes, mainly the Kiowas and Cheyennes, found his message appealing. At first, the Comanche wished to exterminate the Tonkawas, long allies and scouts for the hated Texas Rangers. But disregarding that plan as secondary to the need of saving the buffalo, then approaching extermination at the hands of white hunters, the Comanches decided to attack the hunters in the Texas Panhandle, who were destroying the buffalo and thereby endangering the Native American Plains tribes' chief source of food. On June 27 a party of between 250 and 1000 Indians, primarily all the bands of the Comanches, but including Kiowa and Cheyenne, attacked the buffalo hunters who were camping at the old trading post of Adobe Walls, on the South Canadian River. During the battle, led primarily by the young Comanche Quanah Parker, Kwihnai Tosaabitʉ remained at least a mile away on a distant hill. The buffalo hunters, twenty-eight men and one woman, protected by the solid adobe walls and armed with long-range rifles, fought off the Indians and finally compelled them to withdraw. It was during this battle that Billy Dixon made what may be the most famous rifle shot of the west, hitting a Comanche chief one mile (1.6 km) away.

About fifteen warriors were killed and a larger number wounded, including Quanah Parker.

== After Adobe Walls ==
Kwihnai Tosaabitʉ tried to avoid blame for the disastrous defeat by claiming his magic had been weakened before the battle when a Cheyenne killed a skunk, breaking a religious taboo. This was received poorly (especially by the Cheyenne Dog Soldiers), and he was severely beaten and renamed from Kwihnai Tosaabitʉ (English: White Eagle) to Isataiʔi (Wolf's Vulva). Isatai'i was discredited and publicly humiliated.

== Later life ==
In an entry from the Handbook of Texas, Gaines Kincaid writes that "although many military historians do not consider the Second Battle of Adobe Walls a major historic engagement, it was a crushing spiritual defeat for the Southern Plains Indians, who had come to believe fully in the superhuman prophetic powers of the medicine man". Being driven off by civilian buffalo hunters certainly marked the end of their time as any sort of military power. Within a year, the Comanche and Kiowa were all on the reservation. Isatai'i died in 1916, and is buried in a family cemetery in Stephens County, Oklahoma.
