= Second Battle of Adobe Walls =

1874 battle in Hutchinson County

- Part of the Red River War
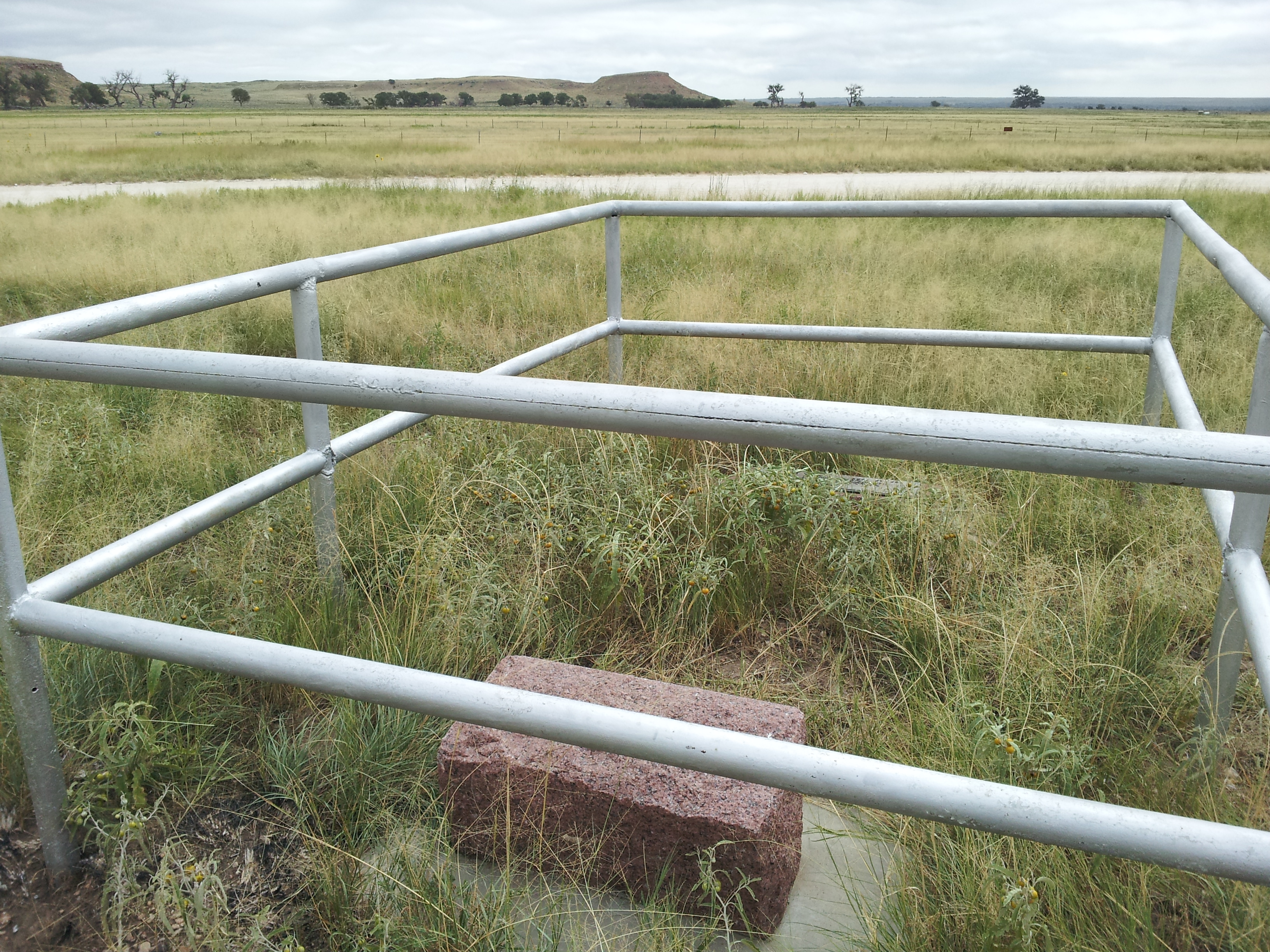
- Adobe Walls battlefield looking southeast from Billy Dixon's grave.
Date	June 27, 1874
Location	Adobe Walls, Texas 35°53′37″N 101°9′43″W
Result	U.S. victory

Belligerents
United States	Comanche; Cheyenne; Kiowa

Commanders and leaders
N/A	Isa-tai (Quahadi Comanche); Quanah Parker (Quahadi Comanche); Kobay-oburra (Quahadi Comanche); Piarʉ Ekarʉhkapʉ (Nokoni Comanche); Mow-way (Kotsoteka Comanche); Tabananika (Yamparika Comanche); Isa-rosa (Yamparika Comanche); Hitetetsi aka Tuwikaa-tiesuat (Yamparika Comanche); Guipago (Kiowa); Satanta (Kiowa); Tsen-tainte (Kiowa); Zepko-ete (Kiowa); Little Robe (Cheyenne); White Shield (Cheyenne)

Strength
28 hunters and tradesmen	~700 warriors

Casualties and losses
4 killed, unknown wounded	Estimated 30 killed, unknown wounded. 15 bodies lay too close to the walls to be recovered + 1 killed long range
- Location within Texas

The Second Battle of Adobe Walls was fought on June 27, 1874, between Comanche forces and a group of 28 Texan bison hunters defending the settlement of Adobe Walls, in what is now Hutchinson County, Texas. "Adobe Walls was scarcely more than a lone island in the vast sea of the Great Plains, a solitary refuge uncharted and practically unknown."

== Background ==
=== Adobe Walls settlement ===
Adobe Walls was the name of a trading post in the Texas Panhandle, just north of the Canadian River. In 1845 an adobe fort was built there to house the post, but it was blown up by traders three years later after repeated Native attacks. In 1864 the ruins were the site of one of the largest battles ever to take place on the Great Plains. Colonel Christopher "Kit" Carson led 335 soldiers from New Mexico and 72 Ute and Jicarilla Apache Scouts against a force of more than 1,000 Comanche, Kiowa and Plains Apache. The Natives forced Carson to retreat, though he was acclaimed as a hero for successfully striking a blow against the Natives and for leading his men out of the trap with minimal casualties. This is known as the First Battle of Adobe Walls.

After the "enormous slaughter" of the buffalo in the north during 1872 and 1873, the hunters moved south and west "into the good buffalo country, somewhere on the Canadian . . . in hostile Indian country". In June 1874 (ten years after the first battle) a group of enterprising businessmen had set up two stores near the ruins of the old trading post in an effort to rekindle the town of Adobe Walls. The complex quickly grew to include a store and corral (Leonard & Meyers), a sod saloon owned by James Hanrahan, a blacksmith shop (Tom O'Keefe) and a sod store used to purchase buffalo hides (Rath & Wright, operated by Langton), all of which served the population of 200–300 buffalo hunters in the area. By late June, two hunters had been killed by Natives 25 miles (40 km) downriver, on Chicken Creek, and two more were killed in a camp on a tributary of the Salt Fork Red River north of present-day Clarendon. "The story of the Indian depredations had spread to all the hunting camps, and a large crowd had gathered in from the surrounding country" at the "Walls".

=== American Indian alliance ===
The remaining free-ranging Southern Plains bands (Comanche, Cheyenne, Kiowa and Arapaho) perceived the post and the buffalo hunting as a major threat to their existence. The 1867 Medicine Lodge Treaty reserved the area between the Arkansas River and Canadian River as Indian hunting grounds. Yet, since 1873, several buffalo hunting parties operated in the area, in violation of the treaty, prompting Indian outrage. In the spring of 1874, the Indians held a sun dance. Comanche medicine man Isatai'i promised victory and immunity from bullets to warriors who took the fight to the enemy.

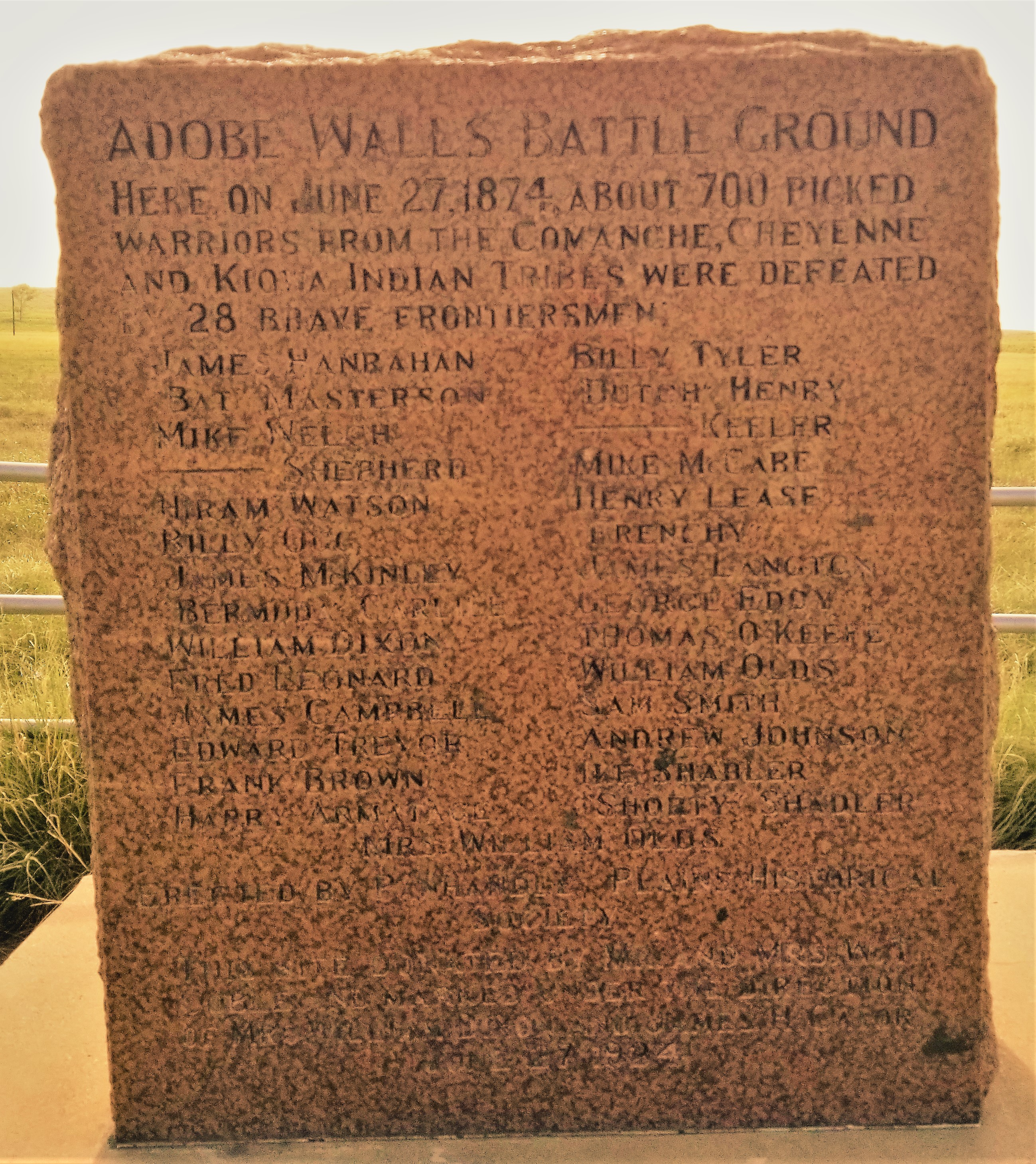

== Battle and siege ==
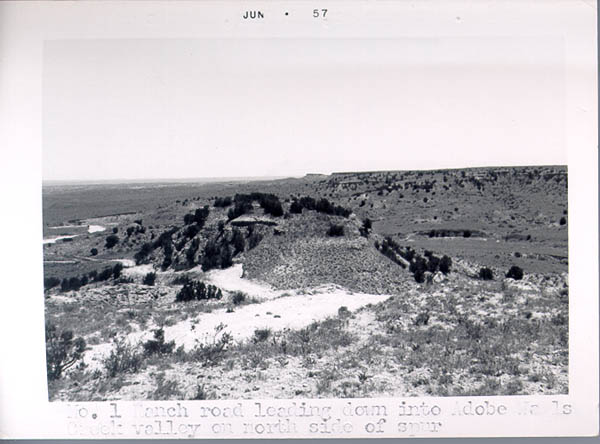
Adobe Walls photograph published 1908

On June 25, 1874, Hanrahan and his party of hunters departed Dodge City, Kansas, for Adobe Walls. The party encountered a band of Cheyenne on June 26 at Sharp's Creek, 75 miles southwest of Dodge City, who ran off all of their cattle. The party then joined a wagon train that was en route to the Walls, arriving just hours before the major battle took place. Some 28 men were then present at Adobe Walls, including James Hanrahan (the saloon owner), 20-year-old Bat Masterson, William "Billy" Dixon, and one woman, the wife of cook William Olds.

At 2:00 am on June 27, the ridgepole holding up the sod roof of the saloon made a loud cracking sound, although two men nearby thought that it sounded like "the report of a rifle". According to some sources Hanrahan awoke the camp by firing a gun, then telling the others that the sound had come from the ridgepole. The reason for his action was that he knew about the attack in advance but did not tell anyone, afraid that men would leave the camp, hurting his business. Everyone in the saloon and several other men from the town immediately set to repair the damage. Thus, most of the inhabitants were already wide awake and up at dawn when a combined force of Comanche, Cheyenne and Kiowa warriors swept across the plains, intent on erasing the populace of Adobe Walls. In Dixon's words:

There was never a more splendidly barbaric sight. In after years I was glad that I had seen it. Hundreds of warriors, the flower of the fighting men of the southwestern Plains tribes, mounted upon their finest horses, armed with guns and lances, and carrying heavy shields of thick buffalo hide, were coming like the wind. Over all was splashed the rich colors of red, vermillion and ochre, on the bodies of the men, on the bodies of the running horses. Scalps dangled from bridles, gorgeous war-bonnets fluttered their plumes, bright feathers dangled from the tails and manes of the horses, and the bronzed, halfnaked bodies of the riders glittered with ornaments of silver and brass. Behind this headlong charging host stretched the Plains, on whose horizon the rising sun was lifting its morning fires. The warriors seemed to emerge from this glowing background.

The Indian force was estimated to be in excess of 700 strong and led by Isatai'i and Comanche chief Quanah Parker, son of captured white woman Cynthia Ann Parker. Their initial attack almost carried the day; the Indians were in close enough to pound on the doors and windows of the buildings with their rifle butts. The fight was in such close quarters that the hunters' long-range rifles were useless. They were fighting with pistols and Henry and Winchester lever-action rifles. After the initial attack was repulsed, the hunters were able to keep the Indians at bay with their large-caliber, long-range Sharps rifles. Nine men were located in Hanrahan's saloon—including Bat Masterson and Billy Dixon—11 in Meyer's & Leonard's Store, and seven in Rath & Wright's Store.

The hunters suffered four fatalities, three on the first day: the two Shadler brothers asleep in a wagon were killed in the initial onslaught, and Billy Tyler was shot through the lungs as he entered the doorway of a building while retreating from the stockade. On the fifth day William Olds accidentally shot himself in the head while descending a ladder at Rath's store. A search following the initial battle turned up the bodies of 15 Indians killed so close to the buildings that their bodies could not be retrieved by their fellow warriors.

By noon the Indians had ceased charging and had stationed themselves in groups in different places, maintaining a steady fire on the buildings; by 2 pm the Indians rode out of range at the foot of the hills, and by 4 pm the besieged started venturing out from the buildings to gather relics and bury the Shadlers. The Indians stayed in the distance while deciding how to handle the situation, effectively laying siege to Adobe Walls.

During the second day the besieged buried or dragged away the dead horses. George Bellfield's outfit made it to the Walls, as did Jim and Bob Cator, while Henry Lease volunteered to ride to Dodge City while two hunters visited the surrounding camps to warn them that "the Indians were on the war path".

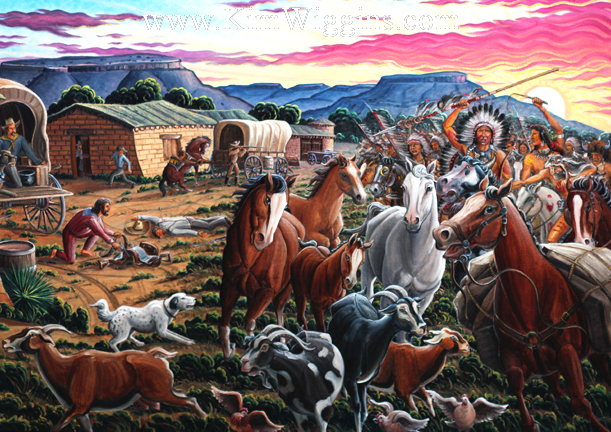
Study of the Second Battle of Adobe Walls, by Kim Douglas Wiggins.

On the third day after the initial attack, 15 Indian warriors rode out on a bluff nearly a mile away to survey the situation. At the behest of one of the hunters, Dixon, renowned as a crack shot, took aim with a rifle that he had borrowed from Hanrahan and cleanly dropped a warrior from atop his horse. "I was admittedly a good marksman, yet this was what might be called a 'scratch' shot." Seeing their fellow warrior killed from such a distance apparently so discouraged the Indians that they decamped and gave up the fight.

More hunters came in on the third and subsequent days so that, by the sixth day, the garrison amounted to about 100 men. Those in the camp might have experienced it as a siege, although sieges were not part of Comanche warfare or battle strategy. Nevertheless, Indians were close by during the days after the initial attack. Quanah had been wounded, which might have taken the edge off the attack, as was always the case with Comanches when the war chief fell in battle. The Indians retired soon afterward. "The Indians probably came to the conclusion that if they remained long enough, charged often enough and got close enough, all of them would be killed, as they were unable to dislodge us from the buildings." Casualty reports vary, although most agree that there were fewer than 30 total deaths.

Within a week of the fight, 25 men headed to Dodge City, including Hanharan, Masterson and Dixon, only to learn upon arrival that a relief party of 40 men under Tom Nixon had already headed south to bring back "Mrs. Olds and the greater part of the men".

By August a troop of cavalry made it to Adobe Walls, under Lt. Frank D. Baldwin, with Masterson and Dixon as scouts, where a dozen men were still holed up. "Some mischievous fellow had stuck an Indian's skull on each post of the corral gate." The killing had not ended, however; one civilian was lanced by Indians while looking for wild plums along the Canadian River. The next day the soldiers and remaining men left Adobe Walls, heading south to join General Nelson A. Miles' main command on Cantonement Creek. The Indians later burned the village to the ground.

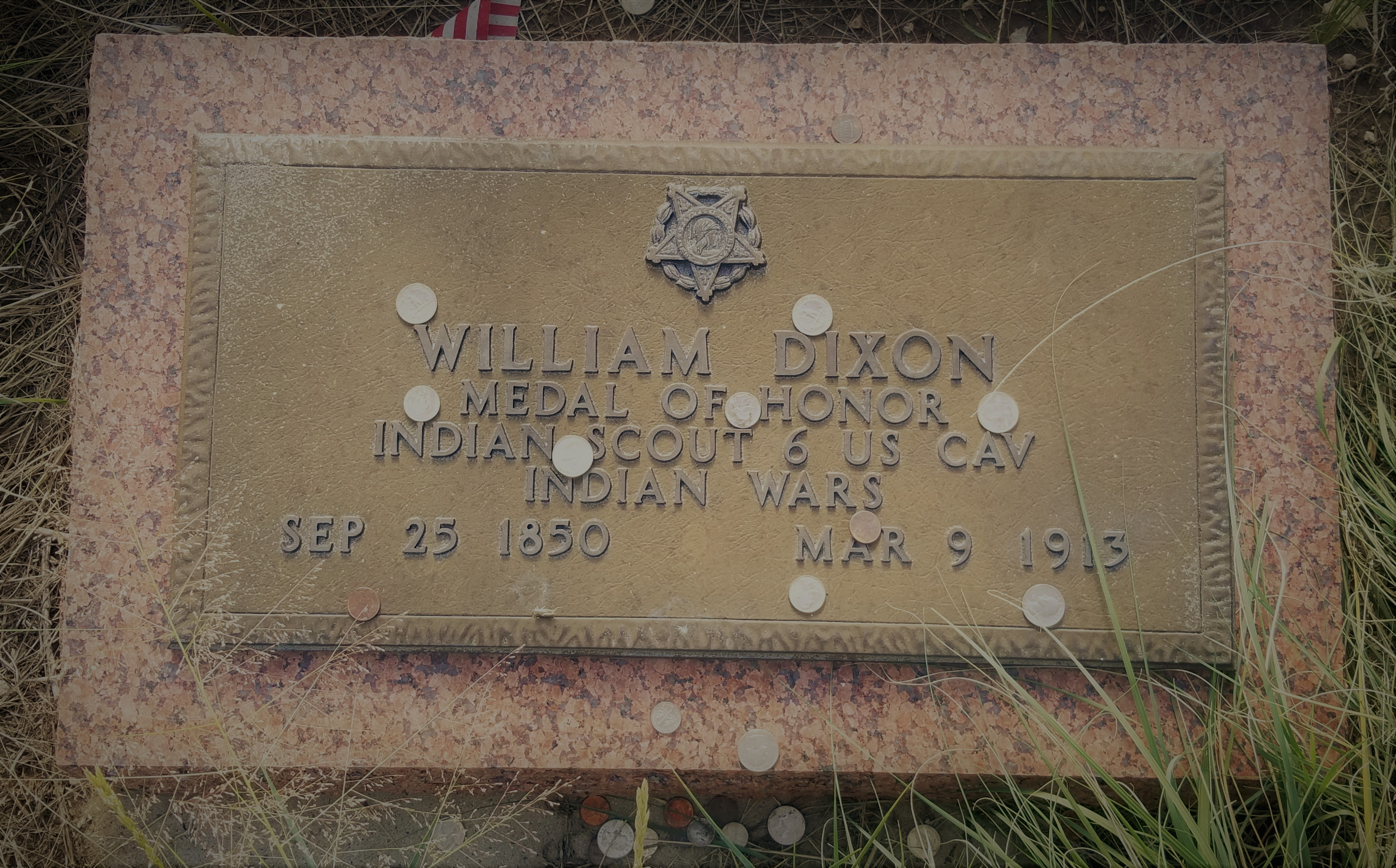

=== Billy Dixon's shot ===
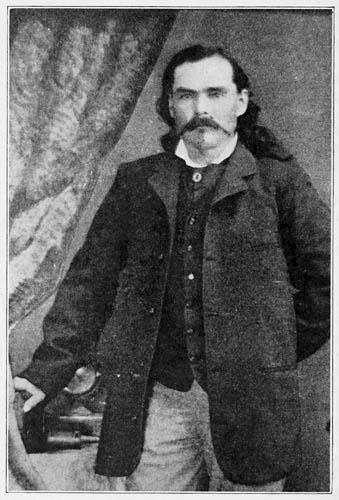
Billy Dixon

Controversy prevails over the range of Billy Dixon's shot. Baker and Harrison set it at about 1,000 yards, while a post-battle survey by a team of U.S. Army surveyors measured the distance at 1,538 yards. For the rest of his life, Billy Dixon never claimed that the shot was anything other than a lucky one; his memoirs do not devote even a full paragraph to "the shot". He, however, did confide to people in the area that he took the shot near an outcropping of rock that hunters regularly shot from their camp in a betting game.

== Aftermath ==
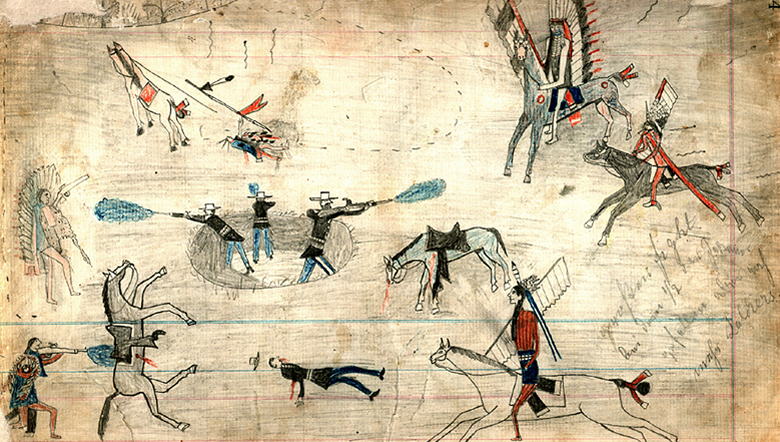
A Kiowa ledger drawing possibly depicting the Buffalo Wallow Battle in 1874, one of several clashes between Southern Plains Indians and the U.S. Army during the Red River War.

Buffalo hunting ended in that region of the country "just as the Indians had planned". The result of Adobe Walls was a crushing spiritual defeat for the Indians, though it was seen as a military victory. It also prompted the U.S. military to take its final actions to crush the Indians once and for all. Within the year the long war between whites and Indians in Texas would reach its conclusion.

In September, just three months after Adobe Walls, an army dispatch detail consisting of Dixon, scout Amos Chapman, and four troopers from the 6th Cavalry were surrounded and besieged by a large combined band of Kiowas and Comanches. During what became known as the Battle of Buffalo Wallow, with accurate rifle fire, they held off the Indians for an entire day. An extremely cold rainstorm that night discouraged the Indians, and they broke off the fight; almost every man in the detail, except Privat Peter Roth (or Rath), was wounded and one trooper killed. For this action, Dixon, along with the other survivors, was awarded the Medal of Honor.

=== Significance ===
This fight is historically significant because it led to the Red River War of 1874–75, resulting in the final relocation of the Southern Plains Indians to reservations in what is now Oklahoma. A monument was erected in 1924 on the site of Adobe Walls by the Panhandle-Plains Historical Society.
