= Dohasan =

Dohäsan (Little Bluff)
- D̶ohausan
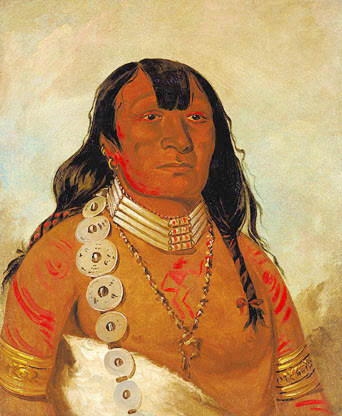
- Chief Dohäsan, painted by George Catlin 1835.
- Born: late 1780s to early 1790s Great Plains (present-day Oklahoma or Texas)
- Died: 1866
- Other names: Little Mountain; Little Bluff; Top-Of-The-Mountain
- Occupation: Chief
- Known for: Last Undisputed Principal Chief of the Kiowa, warrior, war-chief
- Predecessor: A'date (Former principal chief of the Kiowa)
- Relatives: Dohá (father); Dohäsan the Younger (nephew)

Dohäsan (Kiowa: D̶ohausan) (late 1780s to early 1790s – 1866) was a prominent Native American. He was War Chief of the Kata or Arikara band of the Kiowa Indians, and then Principal Chief of the entire Kiowa Tribe, a position he held for an extraordinary 33 years. He is best remembered as the last undisputed Principal Chief of the Kiowa people before the Reservation Era, and the battlefield leader of the Plains Tribes in the largest battle ever fought between the Plains tribes and the United States.

== Name ==
Dohäsan's name, which was hereditary, has been variously translated as Little Mountain, Little Bluff, or Top-of-the-Mountain. The name is difficult because /tòhɔ́ː/ denotes 'the concavity in a bluff rather than the bluff itself. /sân/ indicates 'small'. He was the son of a chief named Dohá (Bluff). Because his name, and the Chieftainship of his band, was hereditary, (though not necessarily father to son) – Dohäsan himself was succeeded by his nephew, rather than one of his sons, and though his father was a chief, it was his uncle who was the hereditary war chief from whom he got his name. Spellings of his name include Dohäsan, Dohosan, Tauhawsin, Tohausen, and Touhason.

== Life before becoming Principal Chief ==
The Arikara band was so named because of their close trading relationship with the Arikaras in the upper Missouri valley during the tribe's early recorded history. Because of their trading relationships with traders from the US, Spain, and the French, the Kiowa, and the Arikara in particular, were well known to European-Americans. Dohäsan was known to traders as early as the late 1820s. He gained a reputation as a fierce, but tricky, warrior and successful war chief. Dohäsan was a member of the elite warrior society, the Koitsenko.

Although his position as Chief of the Arikara band was hereditary, the Principal Chief of the entire Kiowa people was not a hereditary position. The elders of all the bands met together and elected the Principal Chief, and he generally held that position the rest of his life. Dohäsan became principal chief of the Kiowas in the spring of 1833, after the tribe elders and sub-chiefs deposed then-Principal Chief A'date (Kiowa: Àu:d̶áude). This followed the massacre of A'date's village by Osages at Cutthroat Gap, near the head of Otter Creek in what became the Indian Territory of the Oklahomas. Dohäsan was the last undisputed Principal Chief of the Kiowa Tribe while they were a free people.

== After ascension to Principal Chieftainship ==
After A’date was deposed, and Dohäsan arose to become principal Chief of the entire Kiowa people, the United States Army became acquainted with Dohäsan. The massacre of an entire village of the Kiowa prompted the dragoon expedition of Colonel Henry Dodge to Western Oklahoma in the summer of 1834. Dohäsan was among those on hand to greet the colonel and his expedition. Artist George Catlin, who accompanied the expedition, sketched and painted Dohäsan 's portrait. The expedition found Dohäsan to be a friendly and calm in person under peaceful conditions.

A very gentlemanly and high minded man, who treated the dragoons and officers with great kindness while in his country. His long hair, which was put up in several large clubs, and ornamented with a great many silver broaches, extended quite down to his knees."

— -George Catlin

The purpose of the expedition was to end the ferocious fighting between the various Plains Tribes, and in May 1837 Dohäsan was one of the principals who signed the Fort Gibson Treaty, by which the United States government sought to end intertribal warfare in Indian Territory.

Treaties did little to end the Kiowas' frequent raids for horses and other plunder, and it is arguable whether they even slowed the fighting between the tribes. Texas was basically wide open to joint Kiowa-Comanche raids, and the annual raids into Mexico became a dreaded part of life in both Mexico proper and its northern states. In his raids, Dohäsan and his tribesmen and allied Comanche came to live in the winter in the Staked Plains, especially along the Canadian River valley and Palo Duro Canyon, which served as a base for both wintering and the annual raids.

At Palo Duro Canyon, on September 17, 1845, he was sketched by Lt. James W. Abert in his watercolor portfolio. In the summer of 1851 Dohäsan led a war party of the various Kiowa bands, and allied Comanches against the Pawnees near the head of Medicine Lodge Creek in Kansas, killing most of them.

His name again rises in Army records in 1857 when he successfully led his warriors out of an ambush by Mexican soldiers at Hueco Tanks near El Paso Norte in Texas. The Mexicans had pursued the raiders north out of Mexico, and hoped to eliminate them. Instead, most of the Mexican troops were killed or wounded.

The American Government was anxious to keep the Kiowa friendly as the Civil War beckoned, and in late 1859, as a goodwill gesture, Major John Sedgwick's troops gave Dohäsan an old army ambulance wagon along with the usual presents. When he was unable to master the art of driving a team, Dohäsan had a couple of Kiowa boys ride the harnessed horses as he sat in the driver's seat.

In 1861, when federal authorities threatened to withhold annuity goods and send troops against the Kiowas if they did not cease their raiding, Dohäsan angrily and contemptuously called the "white chief" a fool with the "heart of a woman."

=== First Battle of Adobe Walls ===
Dohäsan is remembered in military history for commanding the Native American forces at the First Battle of Adobe Walls.

The first battle of Adobe Walls occurred on November 26, 1864, in the vicinity of Adobe Walls, the ruins of William Bent's abandoned adobe trading post and saloon near the Canadian River in Hutchinson County, Texas. The battle was one of the largest engagements in terms of numbers between European-Americans and Indians on the Great Plains, and the largest engagement ever between the Comanche and Kiowa and their allies, against the non-Natives. It came about because Gen. James H. Carleton, commander of the military district of New Mexico, decided to punish Comanche and Kiowa attacks on Santa Fe wagon trains. The Indians saw the wagon trains as trespassers who killed buffalo and other game the Indians needed to survive.

Col. Christopher (Kit) Carson, was given command of the First Cavalry, New Mexico Volunteers, and told to proceed and campaign against the winter campgrounds of the Comanches and Kiowas. This was the second invasion of the heart of the Comancheria, after the Antelope Hills Expedition. The campgrounds in question were reported to be somewhere on the south side of the Canadian River. On November 10, 1864 Carson started from Fort Bascom with 335 cavalry, and 75 Ute and Jicarilla Apache scouts. Those Carson had recruited from Lucien Maxwell's ranch near Cimarron, New Mexico. On November 12, 1864, Carson’s force, supplied with two mountain howitzers under the command of Lt. George H. Pettis, twenty-seven wagons, an ambulance, and forty-five days' rations, proceeded down the Canadian River into the Texas Panhandle. Carson had decided to march first to Adobe Walls, which he was familiar with from his employment there by Bent over 20 years earlier. Inclement weather, including an early snow storm, caused slow progress, and on November 25, 1864, the First Cavalry reached Mule Springs, in Moore County, approximately 30 miles (48 km) west of Adobe Walls. Scouts reported the presence of a large Indian encampment at Adobe Walls, and Carson ordered his cavalry forward, to be followed by the wagons and howitzers.

Approximately two hours after daybreak on November 26, 1864, Carson's cavalry attacked a Kiowa village of 150 lodges. The Chief, Dohäsan, and his people fled, passing the alarm to allied Comanche villages nearby. Marching forward to Adobe Walls, Carson dug in there about 10 AM, using one corner of the ruins for a hospital. Carson discovered to his dismay that there were numerous villages in the area, including one very large Comanche village. The total number of Indians opposing Carson are often estimated at 3,000, but it is unlikely that the total manpower of the Comanche, Kiowa, and Kiowa-Apache amounted to more than one-half that number. Whatever their numbers, Carson saw he was outnumbered by the warriors pouring forward to engage him in battle, a much greater force than he had expected.

Dohäsan, assisted by Satank (Sitting Bear), Guipago (Lone Wolf) and Satanta (White Bear), led the Kiowas in the first attack. Fierce fighting developed as the Kiowa, Kiowa Apache, and Comanche warriors repeatedly attacked Carson's position. Reportedly, Satanta replied to Carson's bugler with his own bugle calls. Carson succeeded in repelling the attacks only through his clever use of supporting fire from the twin howitzers. After six to eight hours of fairly continuous fighting, Carson realized he was beginning to run low on shells for the howitzers, and ammunition in general, and ordered his forces to withdraw. The angry Indians tried to block his retreat by setting fire to the grass and brush down near the river. The wily Carson, however, set back-fires and retreated to higher ground, where the twin howitzers continued to hold off the Indians. When twilight came, Carson ordered a group of his scouts to burn the lodges of the first village, which also resulted in the death of the Kiowa-Apache chief, Iron Shirt, when he refused to leave his tepee.

Despite the fact that Carson was forced to retreat in the face of much more opposition than he had expected, the United States Army declared the First Battle of Adobe Walls a victory. Carson was probably outnumbered 10-1, and his clever use of backfires and the howitzers prevented his being overrun. As it was, Carson lost 6 dead, 25 wounded, to approximately 50-60 killed among the Indians. Nothing could obscure the fact however that the Kiowa and their allies had driven the American army from the field. Dohäsan, probably in his 70s, had commanded the largest force of Plains Indians ever massed against the army, and compelled a force armed with howitzers to retreat and yield the day.

== Little Arkansas Treaty and death ==
In October 1865 Dohäsan signed the Little Arkansas Treaty, but he vigorously protested confinement to a reservation, declaring that the Kiowas owned all the land from the North Platte River to the upper Texas Panhandle and needed room to roam about. Shortly afterward, in early 1866, he died.

== Beginning of the reservation era ==
As noted earlier, though the chief position in the Kata or Arikara band of the Kiowa Indians was hereditary, it was not necessarily given from father to son, and in this case, it was not.

The aging Set'angia (Sitting Bear), leader of the Koitsenko warriors society, did not take part in the contest with the two younger and already famed war leaders (both of them being Koitsenko), and Gui'pahgo (Lone Wolf), Dohasan's nephew, renowned as warrior and war-leader, and one of the leaders in the Adobe Walls fight, prevailed on Set'tainte (White Bear), the only one warrior leader comparable with him, and was elected as the new head chief of the Kiowa people.

Dohäsan's sister's son, Á:gyâdè (Agiati) or "Gathering Feathers" inherited his name in 1864. The younger Dohäsan took part in the remaining battles as the Kiowa struggled to remain a free people. But time was running out, and he was part of the delegation to Washington in 1872, which appealed to the government to allow the Kiowa to remain free.

Afterward, as the remaining Kiowa went to the reservation, the younger Dohäsan lived with his family in peace on the reservation near Fort Sill until his death.

== Artist and calendar keeper ==
Dohäsan was the primary calendar keeper among the Kiowa throughout most of the 19th century. He added many innovations to Kiowa pictorial art. In his winter count, he added an image for each year's summer Sun Dance. To painted tipi designs, Dohäsan introduced images of counting coup. When he died, his nephew Agiati became a calendar keeper, followed in turn by Agiati's son, Háuñ:gùñ: or Silver Horn (1860–1940), one of the most prolific of all Kiowa artists.

Dohäsen's original calendar is in the collection of the Phoebe Hearst Museum of Anthropology at the University of California at Berkeley. In 1892 the young Dohäsan gave his annual family calendar history, begun by his uncle, the last great principal chief of the Kiowa, to Capt. Hugh L. Scott, who in turn donated it to the Smithsonian Institution.

Dohasan's descendants included his granddaughter, Betty Nixon, who co-founded the Mid-America All-Indian Center in Wichita, Kansas, in 1976.

== See also ==
- First Battle of Adobe Walls
- Indian Wars
- List of Native American artists
