= Sitting Bear =

Kiowa warrior (c. 1880 - 1871)

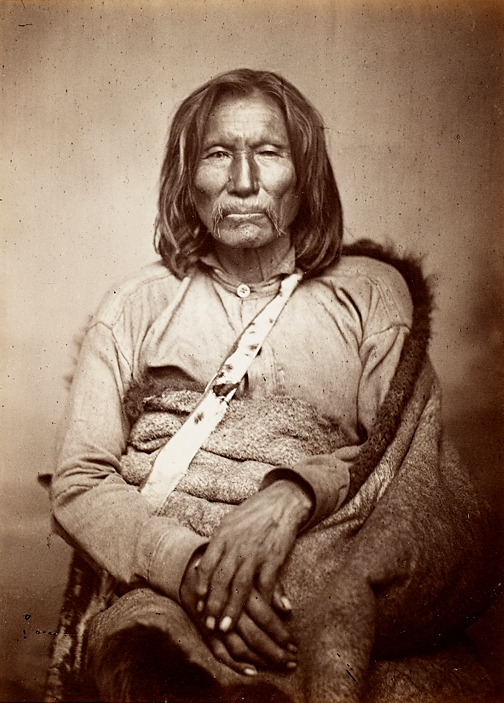
Sitting Bear, 1870. Portrait by William S. Soule.

Sét:àñ:gyà, commonly known as Satank (also Set-angya or Set-ankeah, translated as Sitting Bear), was a prestigious Kiowa warrior and medicine man. He was born about 1800, probably in Kansas, and was killed on June 8, 1871. An able warrior, he became part of the Koitsenko (or Kaitsenko, k’ói:tséñgàu), the society of the bravest Kiowa warriors. He led many raids against the Cheyennes, the Sacs, and the Foxes. As the white settlers' importance increased, he raided settlements, wagon trains, and even army outposts.

== Background ==
In 1860, Satank was a frequent visitor at the Peacock Ranch near present-day Great Bend, Kansas. Satank asked Mr. George Peacock to write a letter of introduction (begging paper) saying that Satank was a good Indian. Peacock took advantage of Satank's illiteracy, and instead wrote that Satank was a bad Indian. When the Chief learned about the trick from Buffalo Bill Mathewson, Satank's tribe killed Peacock and several other people at Peacock Ranch.

== Struggle for power after death of the Kiowa chief Little Mountain (Dohäsan) ==
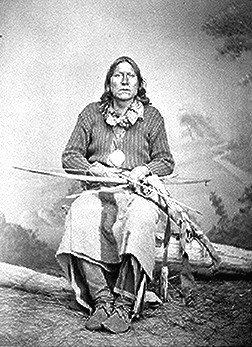
Satanta, or "White Bear"

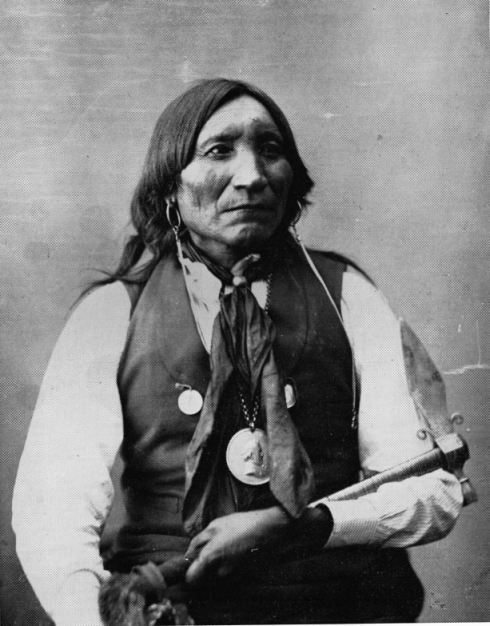
Guipago, or "Lone Wolf"

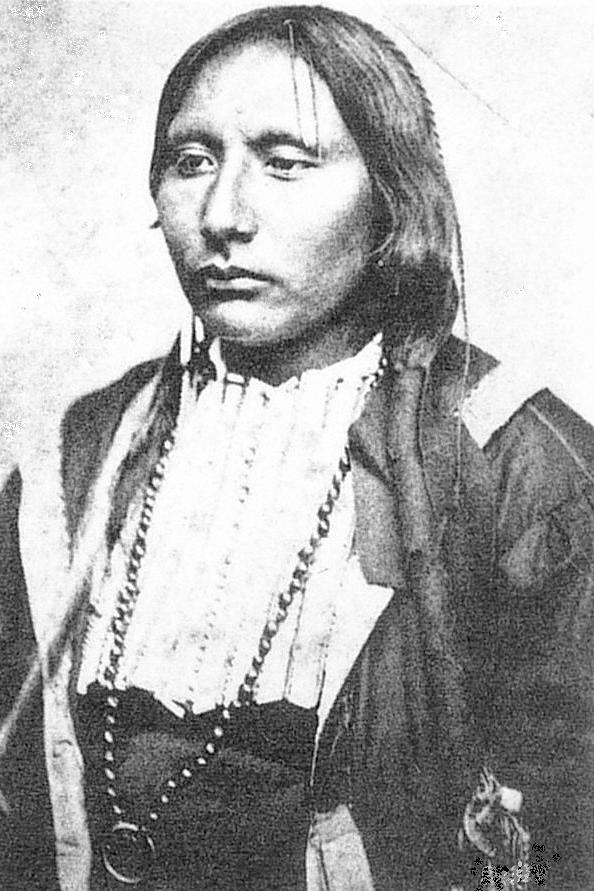
Ado-ete, or "Big Tree"

After the death of the Kiowa supreme chief Dohäsan in 1866, Guipago was selected as the new head chief, Satanta took over the leadership as war chief, with Satank leading the Koitsenko; Tene-angopte (Kicking Eagle), together with Napawat (No Moccasins) was the leader of the white-friendly party. 1867 Satank signed the Medicine Lodge Treaty together with Satanta and other Kiowa chiefs (but not Guipago, who refused to sign).

== Last years and Warren wagon-train affair ==
In 1870, his son, also named Satank, was killed in a raid in Texas. Disconsolate, the old man carried some of his son's bones with him. He stepped up his raiding, in retribution for his son's death, including many conducted by Satanta and other discontented Kiowa, Comanche, and Apache tribes, including the Warren Wagon Train raid, on May 18, 1871, on Salt Creek Prairie in Texas.

The survivors of the Warren train had rushed on to Fort Richardson, where they encountered General William Tecumseh Sherman, who had passed by the raiding party as it lay hidden waiting for the wagon train. The general, realizing that he had escaped death by fate, ordered Colonel Ranald S. Mackenzie and the 4th Cavalry to pursue the war party and bring back those responsible for the attack.

The Army did not catch the war party, the war party caught themselves. Leaders Satank and Satanta had come back to the reservation, and had they kept quiet, no one would have ever found out officially who had committed the Warren Wagon Train raid. But Satanta could not bring himself to be quiet. He asked the Indian agent on the Kiowa-Comanche Reservation for ammunition and supplies, bragging that he, Satank, and young war leader Ado-ete (Big Tree) had led the war party which had recently killed the teamsters at Salt Creek, and that they could have killed General Sherman if they had wished.

Sherman, already enraged over the acts of the war party, was further enraged to hear that he could have been killed. He ordered the arrest of Satank, Satanta, and Big Tree, and personally carried it out on the agent's porch, in spite of Guipago's intervention (the head chief came in well equipped with loaded rifle and guns, fit to fight for his friend's liberty, but had to surrender in front of the massive presence of military troops). Sherman then hit on the ingenious idea of sending the Indian chiefs to Jacksboro, Texas to be tried in state court for murder. He ordered them tried as common felons by the Court of the Thirteenth Judicial District of Texas. This would deny them any vestige of rights as a prisoner of war, which they might keep in a military court martial, and send a message that acts by a war party would be regarded as common crimes rather than legitimate resistance by representatives of a sovereign state. This would mark the first time Indian chiefs had ever stood trial in the white man's court.

== Trial of Satanta and Big Tree ==
General Sherman ordered the trial of Satanta and Big Tree, along with Satank, making them the first Native American leaders to be tried for raids in a US court. Sherman ordered the three Kiowa sub-chiefs taken to Jacksboro, Texas, to stand trial for murder. Satank had no intention of allowing himself to be humiliated by being tried by the white man's court, and told the Tonkawa scouts before the three were to be transported to Fort Richardson that they should tell his family they would be able to find his body along the trail. Satank refused to get in the wagon, and after the soldiers threw him in, he hid his head under his red blanket, (worn as a sign of his membership in the Koitsenko). The soldiers apparently believed the old chief was hiding his face because of humiliation, but in reality, he was gnawing his wrists to the bone so that he could get out of the chains they had put on him. He began singing his death song, and when his hands were free, stabbed and wounded one of his guards - a corporal - in the leg with a knife he had secreted in his clothes, and managed to wrestle the man's rifle from him. Satank was shot to death before he could manage to fire. (A teamster, Antonio Barbello, was wounded by a random shot in the head.) Satank's body lay unburied in the road, with his people afraid to claim it for fear of the Army, though Col. Mackenzie assured the family they could safely claim the remains. Nonetheless, they were never claimed.

== Final resting place ==
Eventually his corpse was buried by the army at Chief's Knoll, on the cemetery at Fort Sill, Oklahoma. Satanta was also brought there after his suicide in prison at Huntsville, Texas, and buried nearby. Other prominent chiefs of the Kiowa, Comanche and Arapaho are also buried on or around the same knoll, such as Kicking Bird (Kiowa), Ten Bears (Comanche), Quanah Parker (Comanche), Yellow Bear (Arapaho) and Little Raven (Arapaho).
