= Fort Richardson (Texas) =

State park and historic site in Texas, United States

- U.S. National Register of Historic Places
- U.S. National Historic Landmark
- Texas State Historic Site
- Texas State Antiquities Landmark
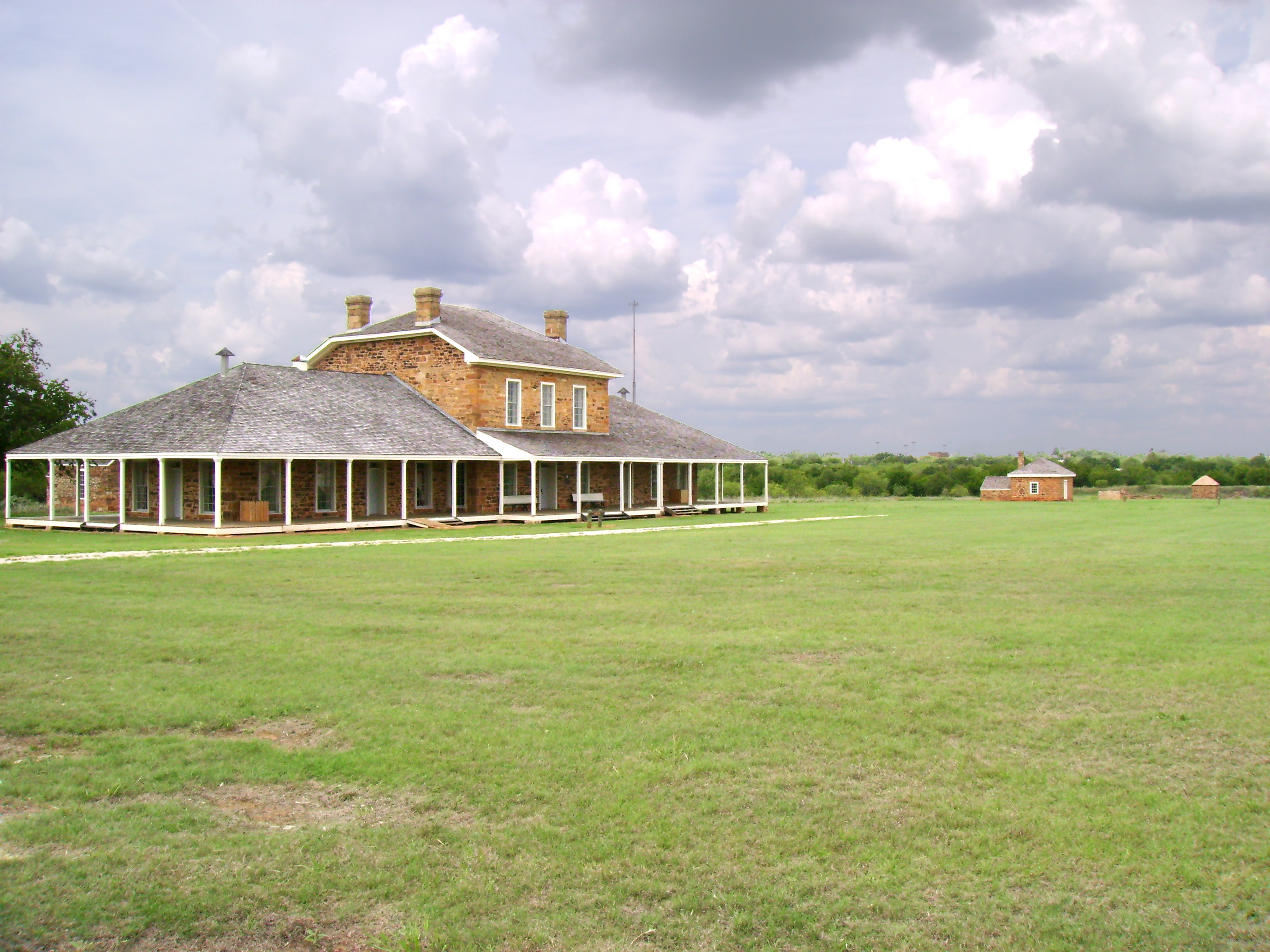
- Looking across Fort Richardson's parade ground toward the hospital. The bakery, guardhouse and magazine are visible in the background.

- Location within Texas Location within the United States
- Nearest city: Jacksboro, Texas
- Coordinates: 33°12′29″N 98°9′53″W
- Area: 42 acres (17 ha)
- Built: 1867
- NRHP reference No.: 66000816
- TSAL No.: 8200000387

Significant dates
- Added to NRHP: October 15, 1966
- Designated NHL: November 27, 1963
- Designated TSHS: 1968
- Designated TSAL: January 1, 1983

Fort Richardson was a United States Army installation located in present-day Jacksboro, Texas. Named in honor of Union General Israel B. Richardson, who died in the Battle of Antietam during the American Civil War, it was active from 1867 to 1878. Today, the site, with a few surviving buildings, is called Fort Richardson State Park, Historic Site, and Lost Creek Reservoir State Trailway. It was designated a National Historic Landmark in 1963 for its role in securing the state's northern frontier in the post-Civil War era.

== History ==
As much as any frontier army installation, Fort Richardson facilitated immigration and settlement in north-central Texas. It was part of a system of forts along the Texas frontier to protect and encourage settlement in north-central and West Texas. Others included Forts Griffin, Concho, Belknap, Chadbourne, Stockton, Davis, McKavett, Clark, McIntosh, Inge, and Phantom Hill in Texas, and Fort Sill in Oklahoma. Some "subposts or intermediate stations" include Bothwick's Station on Salt Creek between Fort Richardson and Fort Belknap, Camp Wichita near Buffalo Springs between Fort Richardson and Red River Station, and Mountain Pass between Fort Concho and Fort Griffin.

The original site selection was ordered for a location near Buffalo Springs in Clay County, about 20 miles (32 km) north of Fort Richardson. The location proved untenable and unfit for a semipermanent installation. The area lacked timber and adequate water resources, and the U.S. considered it "hostile" territory, with Native Americans often raiding the area. In 1862, an entire town, Henrietta, northwest of Buffalo Springs, was abandoned due to lack of security. As a result, the U.S. 6th Cavalry Regiment moved south to the present location of Fort Richardson.

In 1867, construction began by the 6th Cavalry on the 300-acre (120 ha) site along "Lost Creek, a small tributary of the West Fork of the Trinity River", at a cost of $800,000, and occupied on 26 November. It became the anchor of the frontier fort system, and the last army outpost in North Texas along the military road to Fort Sill. "Originally a five-company post, it was expanded...to accommodate ten or more companies" so that in 1872, with a population of 666 officers and men, it was listed as the largest U.S. Army installation in the United States. Old-time cowboy author Frank H. Maynard spent time at Fort Richardson in 1872 when he had come to Jacksboro on a cattle drive.

Units that occupied the fort included the 6th Cavalry Regiment, the 4th Cavalry Regiment, and the U.S. 11th Infantry Regiment, along with parts of the 10th Cavalry Regiment and 24th Infantry Regiment (United States), both Buffalo Soldier regiments.

Life was hard for a soldier at Fort Richardson. Routine duties included long, arduous patrols along the frontier from Clay and Jack Counties west to Palo Duro Canyon near present-day Amarillo. Battles with Comanche and Kiowa became commonplace as the U.S. cavalry and infantry units sought to prove their ability to repel attacks and facilitate white settlement.

In 1871 while touring the system, General William T. Sherman stayed at Fort Richardson and narrowly missed the Warren Wagon Train Raid. General Sherman arrived at Fort Sill and arrested Kiowa chiefs Satanta and Big Tree, and had them sent to Jacksboro to stand trial for their role in the massacre. In July 1871, they were tried, convicted, and sentenced to death, which was later commuted to life in prison. They were the first Native Americans tried and convicted in a Texas civil court system.

Following these events, General Sherman authorized the commander of the 4th Cavalry, Colonel Ranald S. Mackenzie, to begin offensive operations against the Comanche and Kiowa in the Texas Panhandle. One scouting party fought in the Battle of Palo Duro Canyon in September 1874, a U.S. victory that ended the Red River War with Quanah Parker's Comanches and Red Warbonnet's Kiowas. The cavalry captured so much of the tribes' provisions that they were forced to move back to reservations in Oklahoma before winter. This battle was largely responsible for the end to Comanche and Kiowa raids along the northern frontier between Oklahoma and Texas.

== Abandonment and reuse ==
After its victory, the army saw no need to maintain Fort Richardson, so abandoned the post on May 23, 1878. "It was used as an Indian school for a short time afterwards". The 55 buildings, many made of stone and cottonwood lumber, fell into disrepair. Thanks to a group of Jacksboro residents, the fort was declared a state historic site in 1963 and came under the management of the Texas Parks and Wildlife Department. In 1968, extensive renovations began, and in 1973, it reopened as Fort Richardson State Historic Park.

Today, it is called Fort Richardson State Park, Historic Site and Lost Creek Reservoir State Trailway. Visitors can tour seven restored original buildings, including the post hospital, officers' quarters, powder magazine, morgue, commissary, guardhouse, and bakery. Two replica buildings of the enlisted men's barracks and the officer's barracks house the Interpretive Center. Guided tours of the buildings are held daily.

== Gallery ==
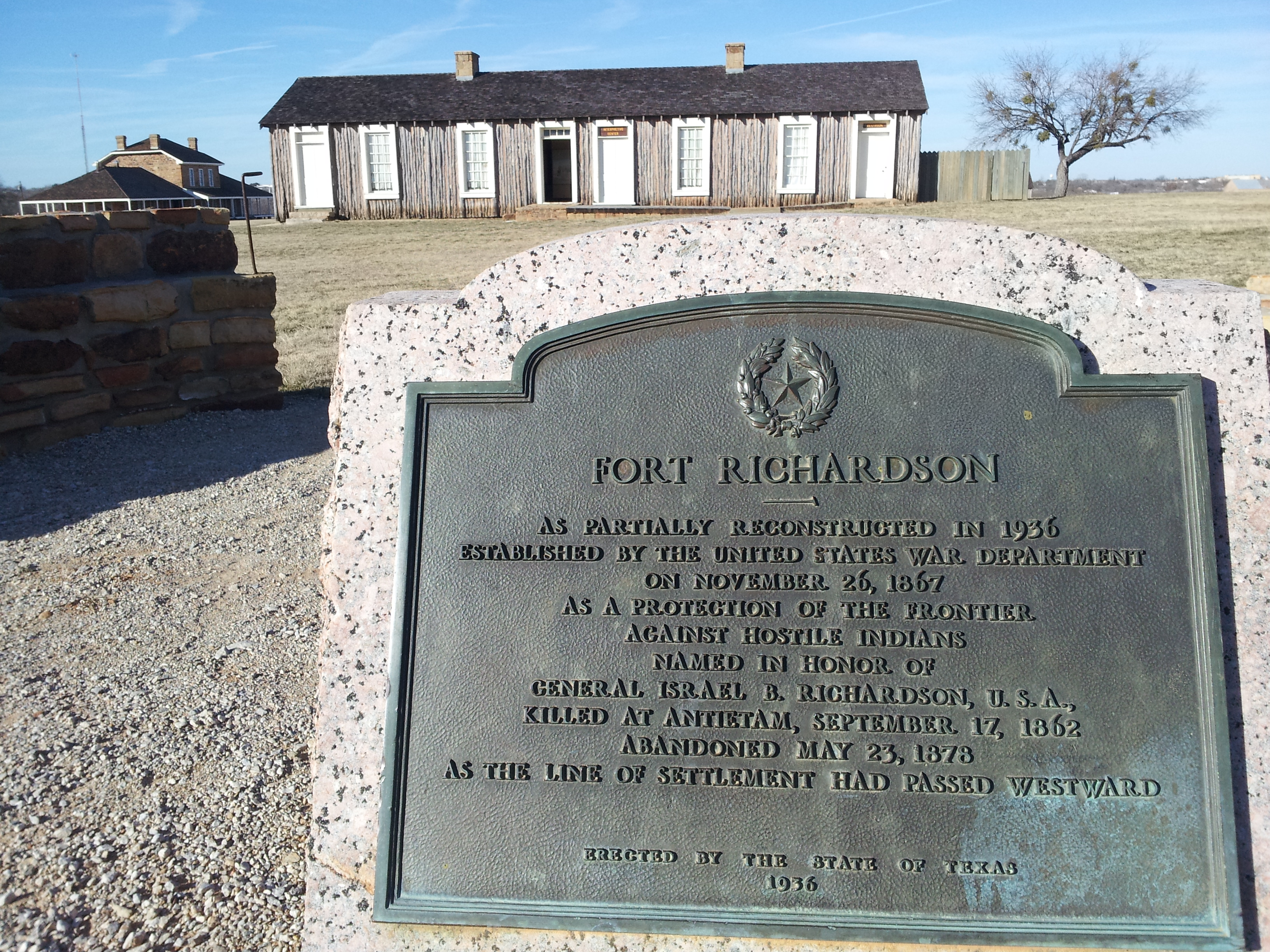
Fort Richardson Texas Historical Marker

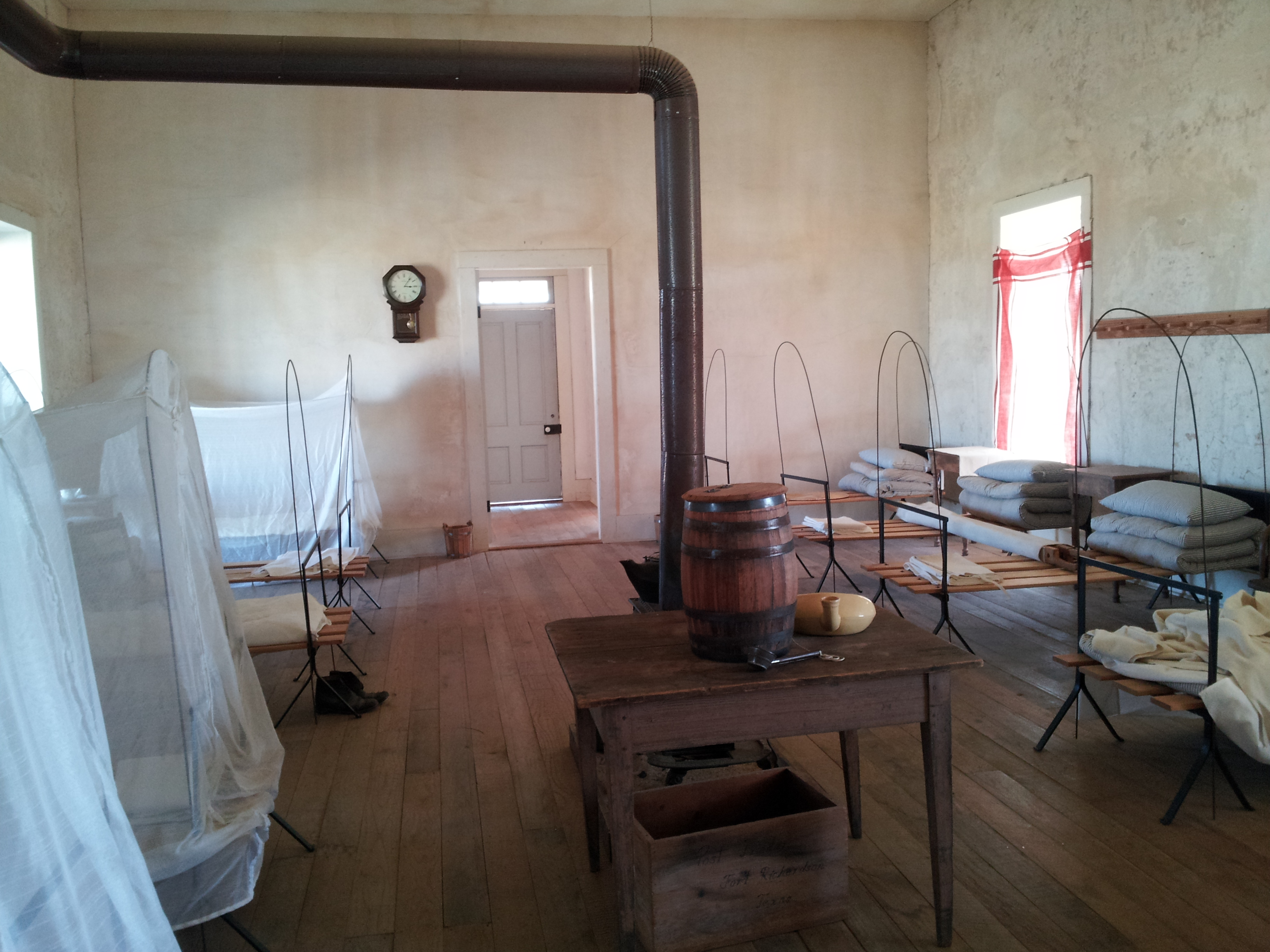
Fort Richardson Hospital

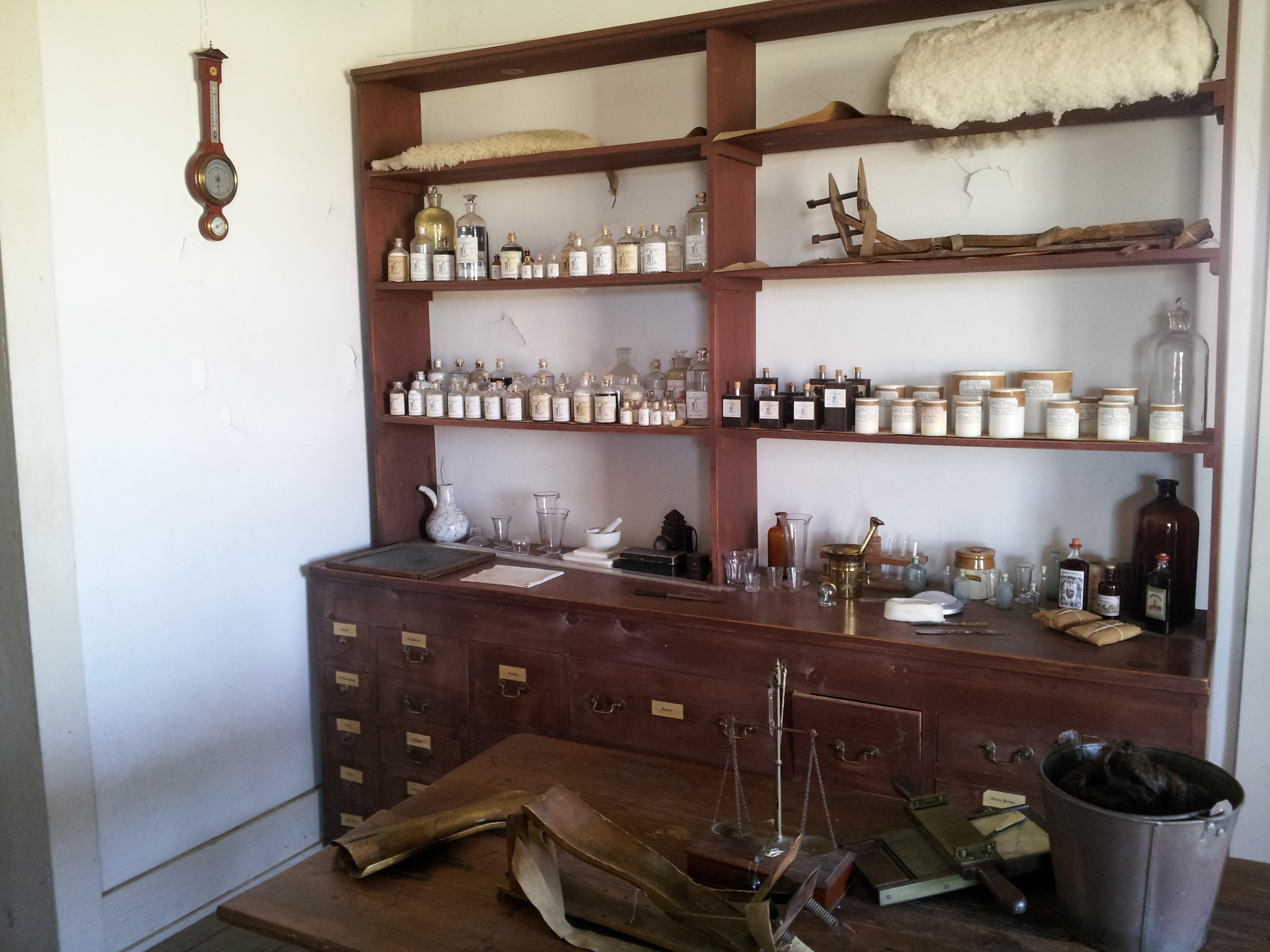
Fort Richardson Pharmacy

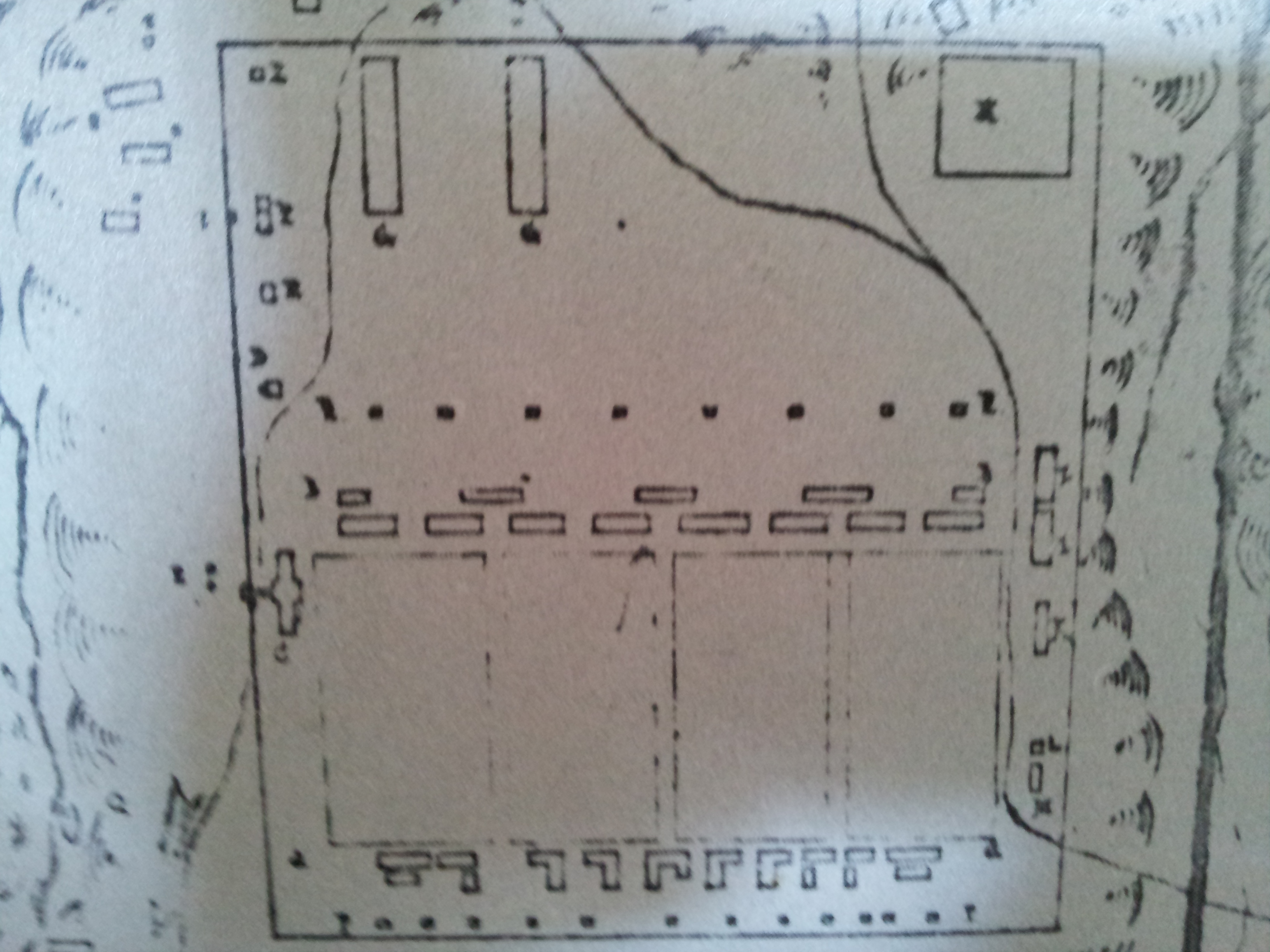
Fort Richardson Period Map

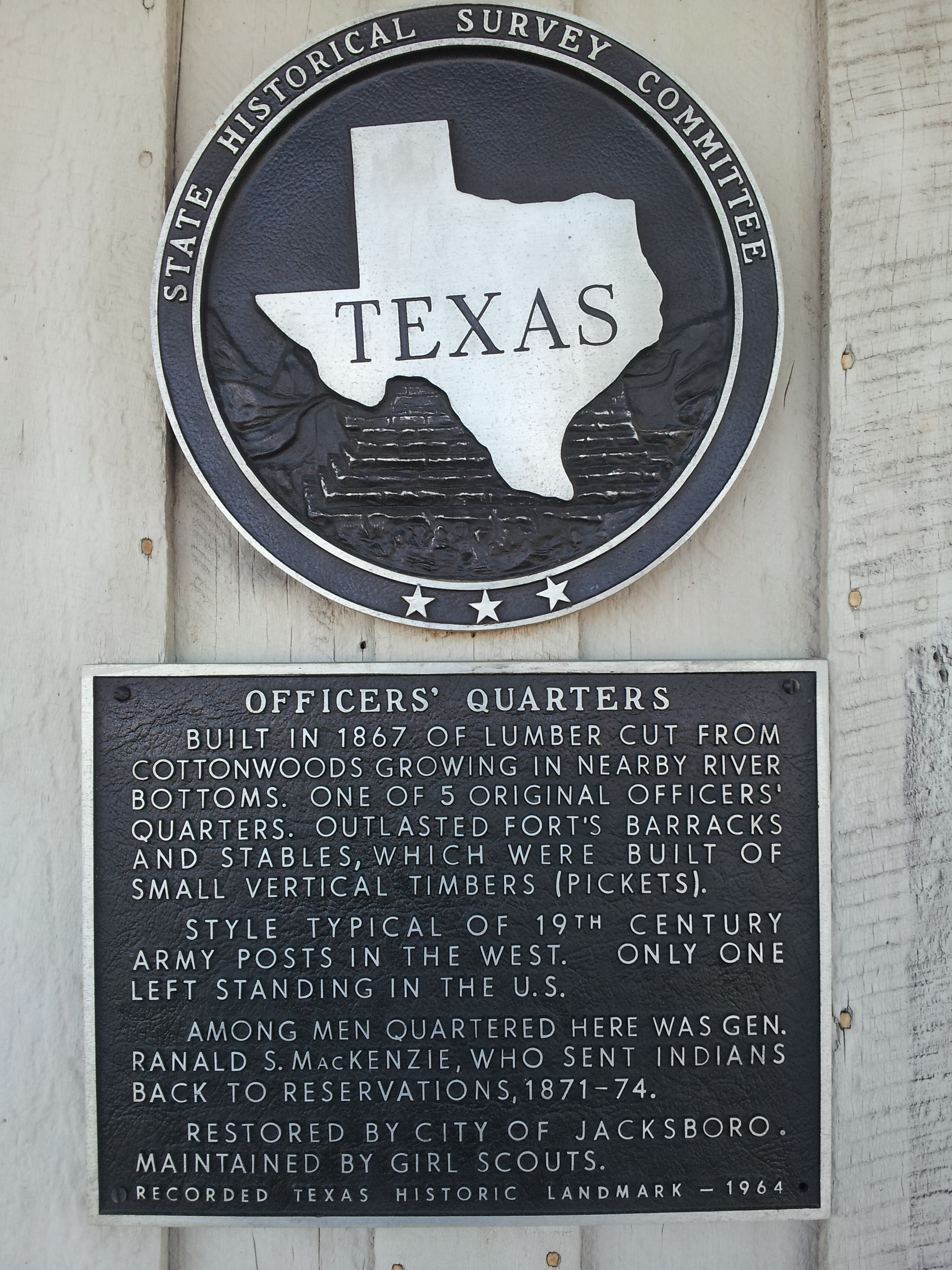
Fort Richardson Officer's Quarters Texas Historical Marker

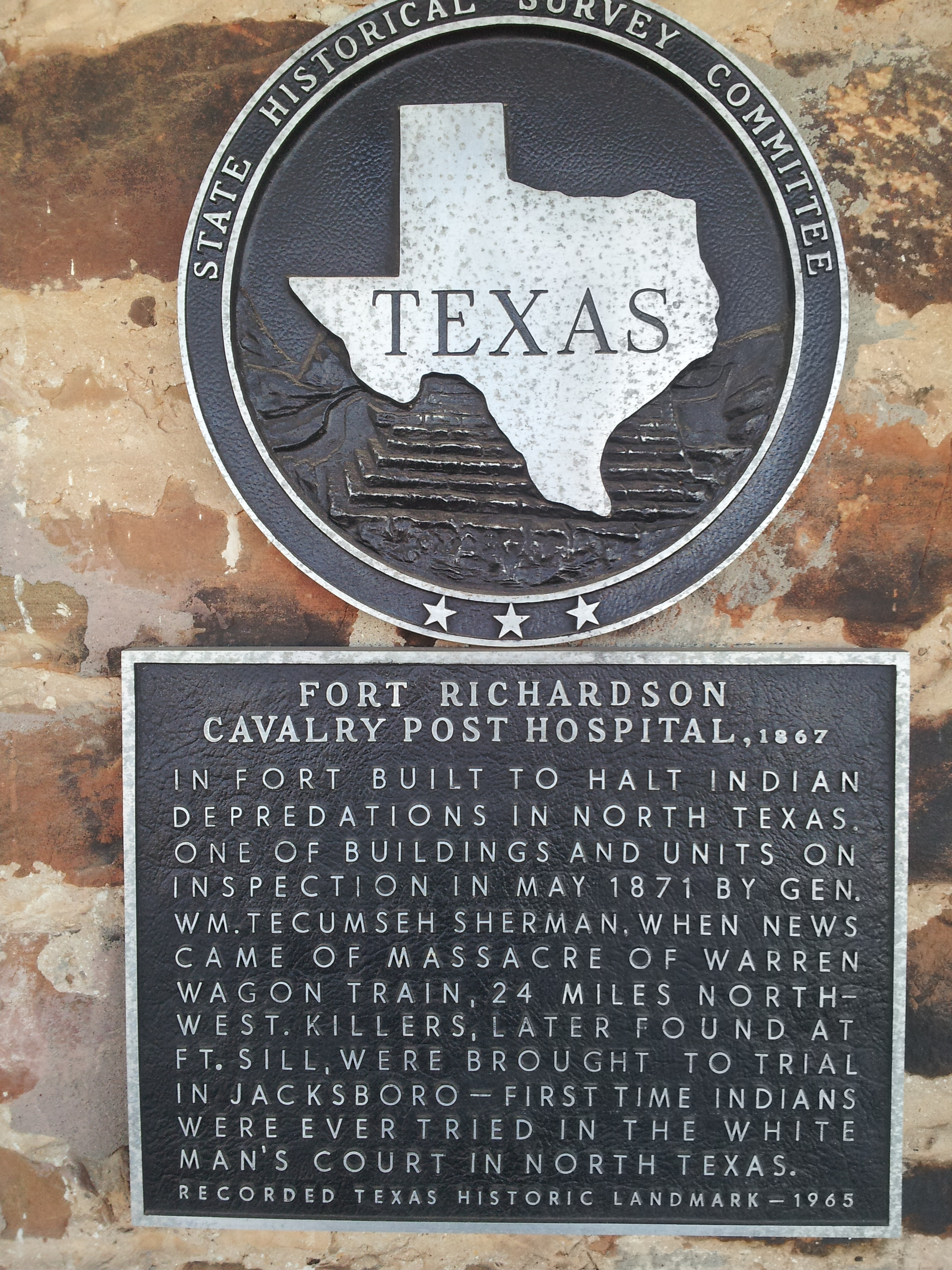
Fort Richardson Hospital Texas Historical Marker

== See also ==
- National Register of Historic Places listings in Jack County, Texas
- List of Texas State Historic Sites
- Recorded Texas Historic Landmarks in Jack County
- List of National Historic Landmarks in Texas
- Texas Forts Trail
- Forts of Texas
