= Jacksboro =

Jacksboro is the name of two places in the United States:

- Jacksboro, Tennessee
- Jacksboro, Texas
  - Lake Jacksboro, a lake in Jacksboro, Texas
