= Alfred Ramirez =

American politician

Member of the Kansas State Senate from the 5th District
- In office 1993–1997
- Preceded by: Bernard Kanan
- Succeeded by: Mark Gilstrap

Member of the Kansas House of Representatives from the 40th District
- In office 1983–1993
- Succeeded by: Candy Ruff

Personal details
- Born: January 25, 1932 (age 94) Zarah, Kansas, U.S.
- Party: Republican

Alfred Ramirez (born January 25, 1932) is a former American politician who served one term in the Kansas Senate and spent 10 years in the Kansas House of Representatives. Born near rural Zarah, Ramirez worked as a production supervisor for AT&T. In 1982, he was elected to the Kansas House, where he served 5 terms. In 1992, he ran for State Senate from the 5th district, and served a single term before leaving the State Senate in 1996; he was succeeded by Mark Gilstrap. In the 1970s, he served as mayor of Bonner Springs, Kansas.
