= Mark Gilstrap =

American politician

Member of the Kansas Senate from the 5th district
- In office January 13, 1997 – January 12, 2009
- Preceded by: Alfred Ramirez
- Succeeded by: Kelly Kultala

Personal details
- Born: September 6, 1952 (age 74) Kansas City, Kansas, U.S.
- Party: Republican
- Spouse: Jo Anne
- Children: 3
- Education: Rockhurst University; Bishop Ward High School
- Occupation: Deputy Revenue Director

Mark Gilstrap (September 6, 1952) is an American politician and a former member of the Kansas Senate, representing the 5th district from 1997–2009. With the backing of Secretary of State Kris Kobach, Gilstrap ran for that same seat in 2012, but lost in the primary to Steve Fitzgerald. A former Democrat, Gilstrap is a fiscal and social conservative, and is one of the state's most ardently anti-abortion politicians.
