= Bernard Kanan =

American politician

Member of the Kansas State Senate from the 5th District
- In office 1989–1992
- Preceded by: Bill Mulich
- Succeeded by: Alfred Ramirez

Personal details
- Born: November 26, 1924 Cameron, Missouri
- Died: August 7, 2006 Wyandotte County, Kansas
- Party: Democratic

Bernard Donald Kanan (November 26, 1924–August 7, 2006) was an American politician who served one term in the Kansas State Senate from 1989 to 1992. Born in Missouri, Kanan narrowly won the Democratic primary election for the 5th Senate district in 1988. He was unopposed in the general election, and took office in January 1989.

He was the Democratic nominee for mayor of Kansas City, Kansas in the 1991 election, but lost the general election. In 1992, he ran for re-election to his Senate seat; he won the primary, but lost in the general election to Republican Alfred Ramirez. In 1995, he made another run for Kansas City mayor, but was defeated in the Democratic primary; it was his last run for office.
