= Senator Braun =

Senator Braun may refer to:

== Members of the United States Senate ==
- Carol Moseley Braun (born 1947), U.S. Senator from Illinois (1993–1999)
- Mike Braun (born 1954), U.S. Senator from Indiana (2019–2025)

== United States state senate members ==
- John Braun (born 1967), Washington State Senate
- Kevin Braun (fl. 2010s–2020s), Kansas State Senate
- Warren Braun (born 1934), Wisconsin State Senate
