= Bill Mulich =

American politician (1926–2022)

Member of the Kansas State Senate from the 5th District
- In office 1973–1988
- Preceded by: Robert Frederick Bennett
- Succeeded by: Bernard Kanan

Member of the Kansas House of Representatives from the 32nd District
- In office 1969–1972

Personal details
- Born: April 6, 1926 Kansas City, Kansas, U.S.
- Died: May 27, 2022 (aged 96) Kansas City
- Party: Democratic

William Thomas Mulich (April 6, 1926 – May 27, 2022) was an American politician who served in the Kansas State Legislature, most prominently spending four terms in the Kansas State Senate from 1973 to 1988.

Mulich was born in Kansas City, the same city he represented in the legislature. He was initially elected to the Kansas House of Representatives in 1968, taking office in 1969, and served two terms there before being elected to the Senate in 1972. He represented the 5th Senate District until 1988, when he was succeeded by fellow Democrat Bernard Kanan. In 1990, he ran in the Democratic primary for Kansas State Treasurer, but was defeated.

Mulich died in Kansas City on May 27, 2022, aged 96.
