= David French (disambiguation) =

David French is an American lawyer and political writer born in 1969

David French may also refer to:

- David H. French (anthropologist) (1918–1994), American anthropologist and linguist
- David H. French (archaeologist) (1933–2017), British archaeologist
- David French (playwright) (1939–2010), Canadian writer for stage and television
- David French (politician), member of the Kansas House of Representatives
- David French (rugby league), Australian former footballer

== See also ==
- David French Boyd (1834–1899), American academic and Civil War veteran; first president of Louisiana State University
- French (surname)
