= Tony Barton =

Tony Barton may refer to:

- Tony Barton (footballer) (1937–1993), English footballer and football manager
- Tony Barton (athlete) (born 1969), American high jumper
- Tony Barton (politician) (born 1961), American politician
