= Fort Richardson State Park, Historic Site, and Lost Creek Reservoir State Trailway =

State park in Jack County, Texas

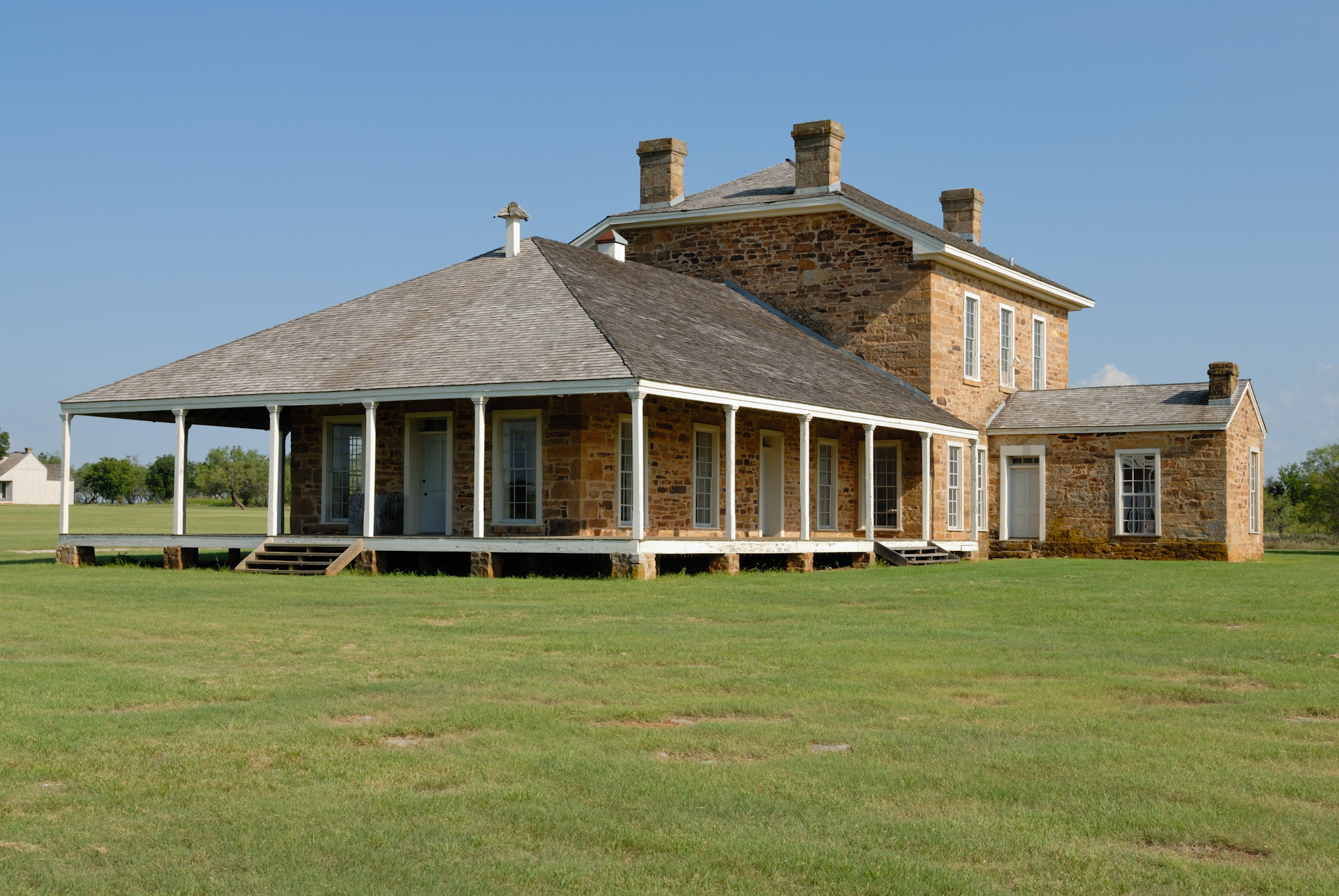
- Fort Richardson hospital

- Location within Texas Location within the United States
- Location: Jack County, Texas, Texas
- Nearest city: Jacksboro, Texas
- Coordinates: 33°12′22″N 98°9′25″W
- Area: 450 acres (182 ha)
- Established: 1968
- Visitors: 64,598 (in 2025)
- Governing body: Texas Parks and Wildlife Department
- Website: Official site

Fort Richardson State Park, Historic Site, and Lost Creek Reservoir State Trailway is a 450 acres (182 ha) state park in Jack County, Texas, United States. Fort Richardson State Park and Historic Site opened in 1973. The associated Lost Creek Reservoir State Trailway opened in 1998. Both units are managed by the Texas Parks and Wildlife Department.

== History ==
The United States Army established Fort Richardson in 1867. It was active from 1867 to 1878. Once abandoned, most of the buildings fell into disrepair. In 1936, the Texas Centennial Commission acquired 41 acres including the surviving fort buildings. The site became a National Historic Landmark in 1963. The post hospital was designated a Recorded Texas Historic Landmark in 1965. TPWD acquired the property in 1968 and extensive renovations began. The park and historic site opened in 1973. Since then, the park has expanded to over 450 acres (182 ha).

Authorized for construction in 1994, the nine-mile Lost Creek Reservoir State Trailway opened on National Trails Day, June 6, 1998, connecting Fort Richardson State Park to the north side of Lost Creek Reservoir, also known as Lake Jacksboro.

== Nature ==
=== Animals ===
White-tailed deer, Mexican long-nosed armadillo, coyote, and raccoon are mammals found in the park. Birds include northern bobwhite, western meadowlark, painted bunting, American kestrel, great blue heron and osprey.

=== Plants ===
Texas live oak, Buckley's oak, Pecan, and sugar hackberry are predominant trees in the park

== Activities ==
Camping, hiking, cycling, horseback riding, boating, kayaking, canoeing, swimming, birdwatching, and fishing are popular activities in the park.

== See also ==
- List of Texas state parks
