= Candy Ruff =

American politician

Member of the Kansas House of Representatives from the 40th district
- In office January 11, 1993 – January 12, 2009
- Preceded by: Alfred Ramirez
- Succeeded by: Melanie Meier

Personal details
- Born: L. Candy Williamson; February 13, 1951 Springfield, Missouri, U.S
- Died: June 16, 2016 (aged 65)
- Party: Democratic
- Spouse: Gregory
- Education: University of Kansas

L. Candy Ruff (February 13, 1951 - June 16, 2016) was an American politician who was a Democratic member of the Kansas House of Representatives, who represented the 40th District from 1993 to 2009.

== Early life ==
L. Candy Williamson was born on February 13, 1951, in Springfield, Missouri, to Lyndall C. and Eleanor Burtner Williamson. She was one of five children, graduating from Parkview High School in Springfield in 1969. After high school she graduated from the University of Kansas with a bachelor's degree and then a master's degree. Candy also attended the University of Missouri–Kansas City, and in 2012 earned her doctorate from the University of Kansas. Following college, she worked as a journalist for the Leavenworth Times between 1982 and 1992.
