= Don Navinsky =

American politician

Member of the Kansas House of Representatives from the 40th district
- In office February 25, 2009 – January 19, 2010
- Preceded by: Melanie Meier
- Succeeded by: Melanie Meier

Personal details
- Born: January 24, 1944 (age 82)
- Party: Democratic
- Spouse: Shirley

Don Navinsky (January 24, 1944) was a Democratic member of the Kansas House of Representatives, represented the 40th district. He has served since February 25, 2009, replacing Rep. Melanie Meier when she was called up for active duty. He relinquished the seat upon Meier's return in January 2010.

== Committee membership ==
- Vision 2020
- Veterans, Military and Homeland Security
- Agriculture and Natural Resources

== Major donors ==
The top 5 donors to Navinsky's 2008 campaign:

- 1. Navinsky, Donald J $2,067
- 2. Manville, Bill $250
- 3. Lexeco $250
- 4. The Heavy Constructors Assoc $200
- 5. Nen, Bill $100
