= John Bradford (Kansas politician) =

American politician

Member of the Kansas House of Representatives from the 40th district
- In office January 14, 2013 – January 9, 2017
- Preceded by: Melanie Meier
- Succeeded by: Debbie Deere

Personal details
- Born: February 2, 1951 (age 75)
- Party: Republican
- Spouse: Donna M. Cote
- Profession: consultant, retired military officer

John Bradford (born February 2, 1951) is an American politician. He has served as a Republican member for the 40th district in the Kansas House of Representatives from 2013 to 2017. In 2016, the American Conservative Union gave him a lifetime rating of 85%.

In 2015, he was criticized online after an email exchange with one of his constituents concerning new Kansas ridesharing legislation. He later expressed regret over his choice of words, and claimed that his office had received a large number of pre-composed emails from Uber.
