= Jeff Pittman =

American politician (born 1971)

Member of the Kansas Senate from the 5th district
- In office January 11, 2021 – January 13, 2025
- Preceded by: Kevin Braun
- Succeeded by: Jeff Klemp

Member of the Kansas House of Representatives from the 41st district
- In office January 9, 2017 – January 11, 2021
- Preceded by: Tony Barton
- Succeeded by: Pat Proctor

Personal details
- Born: Jeffrey Thomas Pittman; March 3, 1971 (age 55) Leavenworth, Kansas
- Party: Democratic
- Spouse: Holly
- Children: 3
- Education: Massachusetts Institute of Technology; Oxford University

Jeffrey Thomas Pittman (born 1971) is an American politician. He served as a Democratic member of the Kansas House of Representatives, representing the 41st district from 2017 to 2021, and of the Kansas Senate, representing the 5th district from 2021 to 2025.

== Political career ==
Pittman was elected to represent District 41 in the Kansas House of Representatives in 2016, defeating incumbent Tony Barton. He was re-elected in 2018, again defeating Barton.

Pittman defeated incumbent Republican Kevin Braun in the 2020 election to represent District 5 in the Kansas Senate. He narrowly lost his bid for re-election in 2024 to Republican Jeff Klemp.

=== Electoral record ===
2016 general election: Kansas House of Representatives, District 41
Party	Candidate	Votes	%
Democratic	Jeff Pittman	3,433	55.00%
Republican	Tony Barton	2,809	45.00%

2018 general election: Kansas House of Representatives, District 41
Party	Candidate	Votes	%
Democratic	Jeff Pittman	3,037	57.4%
Republican	Tony Barton	2,256	42.6%

2020 general election: Kansas State Senate District 5
Party	Candidate	Votes	%
Democratic	Jeff Pittman	16,753	53.1%
Republican	Kevin Braun (incumbent)	14,818	46.9%
