= Jacksboro Municipal Airport =

Public airport in Jacksboro, Texas, United States

- IATA: none; ICAO: none; FAA LID: 21F

Summary
- Airport type: Public
- Owner: City of Jacksboro
- Serves: Jacksboro, Texas
- Location: 828 Twin Lake Road, Jacksboro, TX 76458
- Elevation AMSL: 1,062.0 ft (323.7 m)
- Coordinates: 33°13′40″N 098°08′47″W
- Website: Jacksboro Municipal Airport at the City of Jacksboro

Map
- Location within Texas

Runways
Direction	Length		Surface
Direction	ft	m	Surface
17/35	3,220	982	Asphalt

Statistics (2018)
- Aircraft operations: 1,500
- Based aircraft: 10
- Sources: Federal Aviation Administration except as noted

Jacksboro Municipal Airport (FAA LID: 21F) is a public airport in Jacksboro, Jack County, Texas, United States, located 1 nautical mile (1.9 km) northeast of the central business district. The airport has no IATA or ICAO designation.

The airport is used solely for general aviation purposes.

== Facilities ==
Jacksboro Municipal Airport covers 65 acres (26 ha) at an elevation of 1,062.0 feet (323.7 m) above mean sea level (AMSL), and has one runway:

- Runway 17/35: 3,220 x 75 ft. (982 x 23 m), Surface: Asphalt

For the 12-month period ending 8 February 2018, the airport had 1,500 aircraft operations, an average of 4 per day: 100% general aviation. At that time there were 10 aircraft based at this airport: 80% single-engine, 10% multi-engine, and 10% ultralights, with no helicopters, jets, or gliders.

== See also ==
- List of airports in Texas
