= Melanie Meier =

American politician (born 1967)

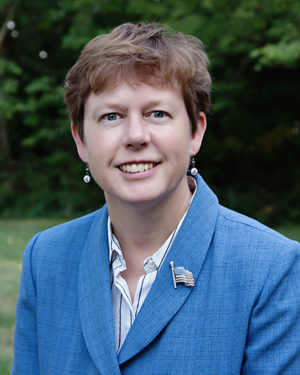

Member of the Kansas House of Representatives from the 41st district
- In office January 14, 2013 – January 12, 2015
- Preceded by: Jana Goodman
- Succeeded by: Tony Barton

Member of the Kansas House of Representatives from the 40th district
- In office January 19, 2010 – January 14, 2013
- Preceded by: Don Navinsky
- Succeeded by: John Bradford
- In office January 12, 2009 – February 21, 2009
- Preceded by: Candy Ruff
- Succeeded by: Don Navinsky

Personal details
- Born: August 25, 1967 (age 59) U.S. Army base, Wurzburg, Germany
- Party: Democratic
- Spouse: Tom Meier
- Education: University of Saint Mary; University of Kansas

Military service
- Allegiance: United States
- Branch/service: United States Army
- Years of service: 1990–present
- Rank: Lieutenant Colonel
- (Photo courtesy of Tracie Lansing Photography)

Melanie Meier (born August 25, 1967) is a Democratic member of the Kansas House of Representatives, representing the 40th district. An officer in the United States Army Reserve, she was called up for active duty and replaced by Don Navinsky in February 2009. Once Meier's tour of duty in Iraq was complete, in January 2010, Navinsky relinquished the seat and Meier resumed her duties at the State House. She was re-elected to a second term in November 2010.

== Early life and career ==
Meier was born in a United States Army hospital in Würzburg, Germany, where her father, who was serving as an army officer and her mother was the bookkeeper at the local Rod and Gun Club. Meier's father's career in the army took their family to many duty stations, and she attended a new school every year until she began junior high school in Leavenworth, Kansas, where her family settled after her father's retirement from the Army.

Meier graduated from Leavenworth High School in 1985 and attended the University of Saint Mary in Leavenworth for two years before transferring to the University of Kansas in 1987. While at the University of Kansas, Meier joined the Army ROTC program and was selected for active duty. She graduated from the University of Kansas in 1989 a Distinguished Military Graduate with a bachelor's degree in economics.

== Current legislative committees ==
Melanie Meier has been a member of the following committees:

- Corrections and Juvenile Justice, Member
- Judiciary, Member
- Veterans, Military and Homeland Security, Ranking Minority Member

== Professional experience ==
Malnie Meier has had the following professional experience:

- Inspector General, Lieutenant Colonel, United States Army Reserve, 1989–present
- Senior Military Analyst, Systems Studies and Simulations Incorporated

== Organizations ==
Melanie Meier has been a member of the following organizations:

- Membership Chairperson, Leavenworth Historical Museum Association, 2002–present
- Board Member, Historical and Archaeological Society of Fort Riley, 2002-2005
- Volunteer, Red Cross
