= Jeff Klemp =

American politician

Member of the Kansas Senate from the 5th district
- Incumbent
- Assumed office January 13, 2025
- Preceded by: Jeff Pittman

Personal details
- Born: Jeffrey Christopher Klemp; 1969 (age 56–57) Leavenworth County, Kansas, U.S.
- Party: Republican
- Education: University of Kansas (BA); Baker University (MBA)

Jeffrey Christopher Klemp is an American politician serving as a member of the Kansas Senate from the 5th district since 2025. A Republican, he was the running mate of Ty Masterson for lieutenant governor in the 2026 Kansas gubernatorial election.

== Early life and education ==
Klemp is a lifelong resident of Leavenworth County, Kansas. He was reportedly raised on an angus farm and graduated from Leavenworth High School. Klemp earned a Bachelor of Arts degree from the University of Kansas and an MBA from Baker University.

== Business career ==
Klemp owns Century Van Lines, a moving company based in Leavenworth County, and serves as its president and CEO. He and his wife own the company; he also holds ownership stakes in several consulting companies including Kinetic Retail Group.

In August 2020, Klemp was appointed chief operating officer and as a director of pizza vending machine company Basil Street Cafe, Inc. In May 2022, he was noted as the company's chief restructuring officer during its liquidation.

== Political career ==
=== Elections ===
In 2011, Klemp challenged incumbent Andi Pawlowski for Ward 2 of the Lansing city council. He was defeated with 185 votes to Pawlowski's 222.

In 2024, Klemp ran for the Kansas Senate challenging incumbent Democrat Jeff Pittman for the 5th district. The race attracted large amounts of spending, including $100,000 supporting Klemp from the Kansas Republican Senatorial Committee and $54,000 supporting Pittman from governor Laura Kelly's Middle of the Road PAC. A week prior to the election, former U.S. Secretary of State Mike Pompeo and his associated Champion American Values PAC endorsed Klemp.

Following a recount by the Kansas Secretary of State, Klemp was declared the winner by 31 votes. He attributed his victory, as well as the Kansas Republican Party expanding its supermajorities in the House and Senate, to concerns on taxes.

At the start of June 2026, senate president Ty Masterson announced Klemp as his running mate for lieutenant governor in the 2026 Kansas gubernatorial election.

=== Tenure ===
In 2025, Klemp advocated for Sales Tax and Revenue (STAR) bonds to be used to redevelop shopping malls.

== Electoral history ==
2024 Kansas Senate election, District 5
Primary election
Party	Candidate	Votes	%
Republican	Jeff Klemp	3,174	59.30
Republican	Echo Van Meteren	2,178	40.70
Total votes		5,352	100.00
General election
Republican	Jeff Klemp	15,732	50.05
Democratic	Jeff Pittman (incumbent)	15,701	49.95
Total votes		31,433	100.00
Republican gain from Democratic			

Party political offices
Preceded by Katie Sawyer	Republican nominee for Lieutenant Governor of Kansas; 2026	Most recent
