= Kelly Kultala =

American politician

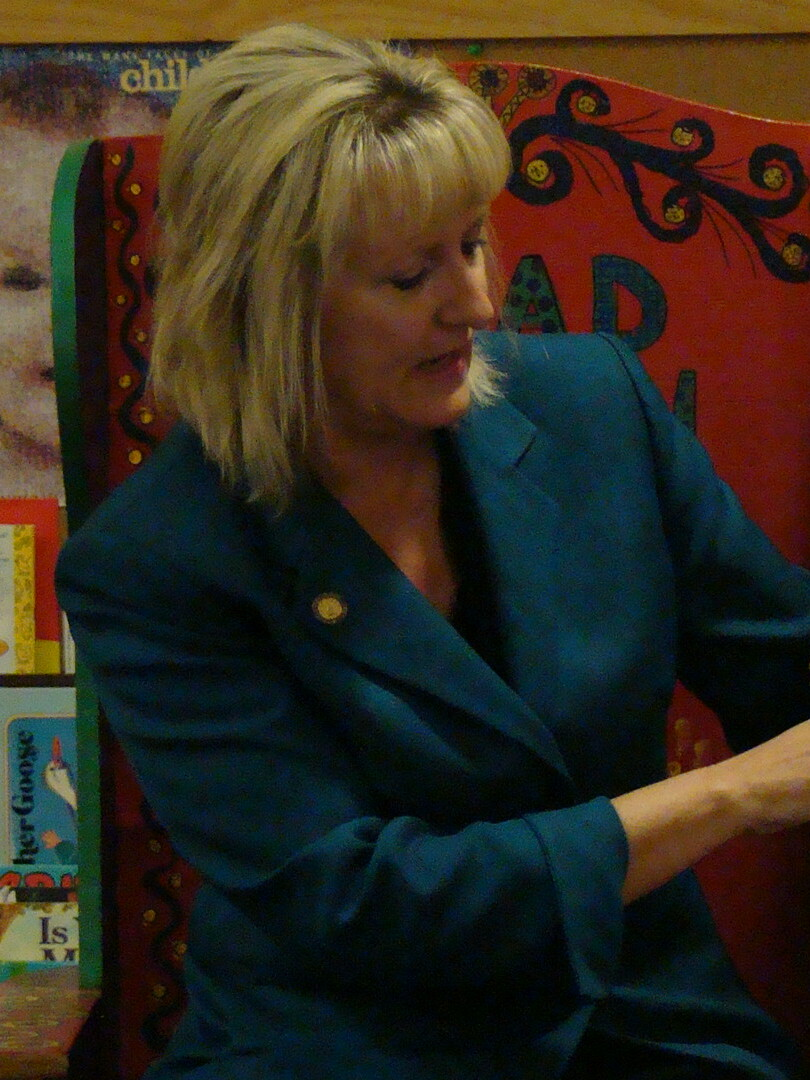

Member of the Kansas Senate from the 5th district
- In office January 12, 2009 – January 14, 2013
- Preceded by: Mark Gilstrap
- Succeeded by: Steve Fitzgerald

Personal details
- Born: August 16, 1958 (age 68) Leavenworth, Kansas, U.S.
- Party: Democratic
- Spouse: Daniel
- Children: 3
- Education: University of Kansas

Kelly Kultala (born August 16, 1958) is a Democratic former member of the Kansas Senate, representing the 5th district from 2009 to 2013. She also served as the 5th District Commissioner for the government of Wyandotte County/Kansas City from 2001 to 2005. She has served on the Piper School Board and is a current member of the Wyandotte County Library Board. She is married with three children. She is a practicing Roman Catholic.

Kultala was selected by state Sen. Tom Holland to be his running mate in the 2010 Kansas gubernatorial election. Unopposed in the primary, Kultala was the Democratic Party's nominee for Lieutenant Governor of Kansas.

In 2014 she ran against Kevin Yoder in Kansas's 3rd congressional district, losing the election 60% to 40%.

== Previous committee assignments ==
Kultala served on these legislative committees:

- Local Government
- Transportation
- Ethics and Elections
- Joint Committee on Home and Community Based Services Oversight
- Joint Committee on Special Claims Against the State
- Joint Committee on State-Tribal Relations
- Ways and Means

== Sponsored legislation ==
Kultala co-sponsored a bill regarding elections and an election commissioner as well as various other Senate bills.

Party political offices
Preceded by Mark Parkinson	Democratic nominee for Lieutenant Governor of Kansas; 2010	Succeeded by Jill Docking
