= Debbie Deere =

American politician (born 1964)

Member of the Kansas House of Representatives from the 40th district
- In office January 9, 2017 – January 14, 2019
- Preceded by: John Bradford
- Succeeded by: David French

Personal details
- Born: July 14, 1964 (age 62) Fairview, Kansas, U.S.
- Party: Democratic
- Spouse: Kyle
- Profession: educator

Debbie Deere (born July 14, 1964) is an American politician. She has served as a Democratic member for the 40th district in the Kansas House of Representatives since 2017.
