= Jacksboro, Texas =

Jacksboro, Texas Mesquiteville
- City
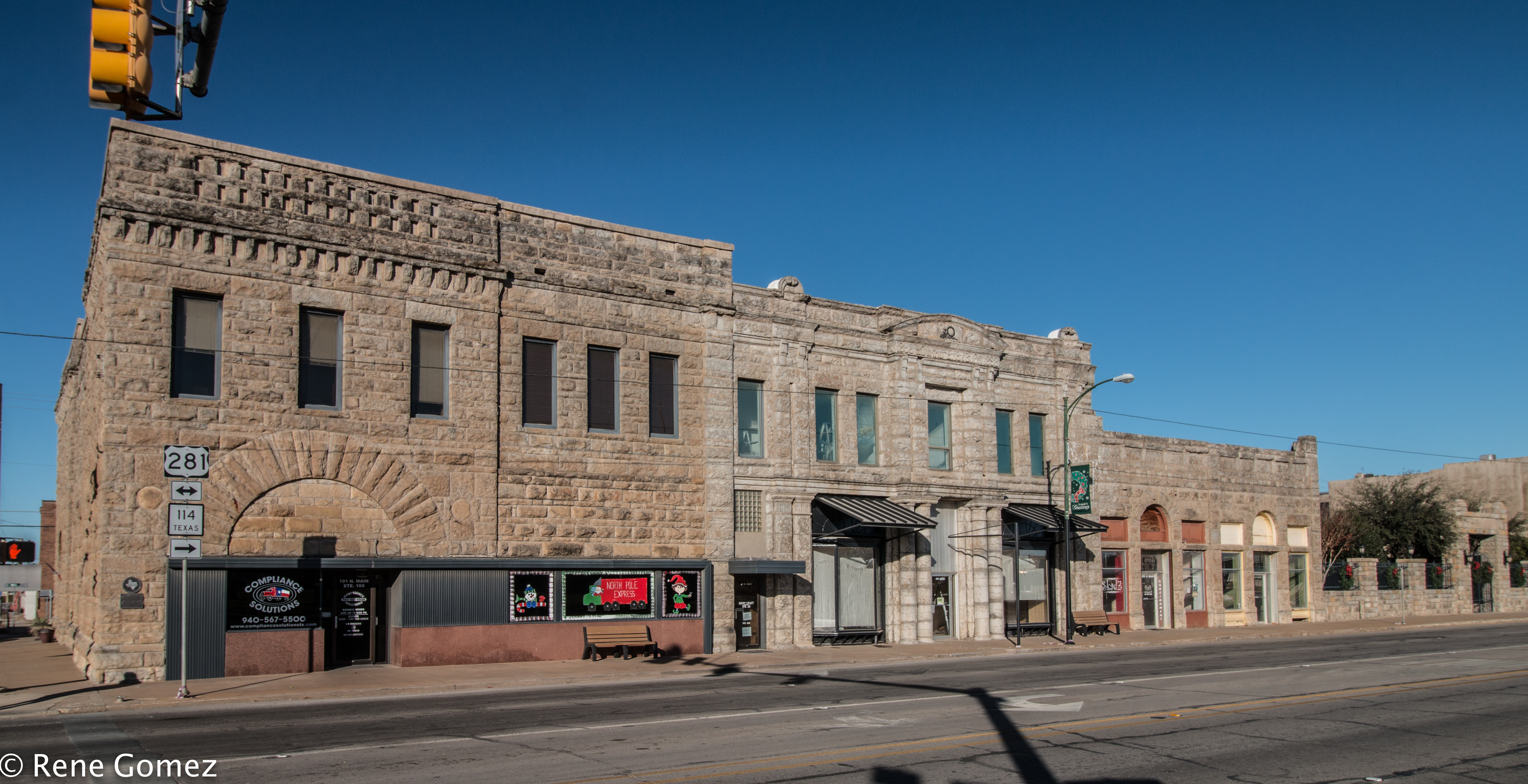
- Businesses in downtown Jacksboro

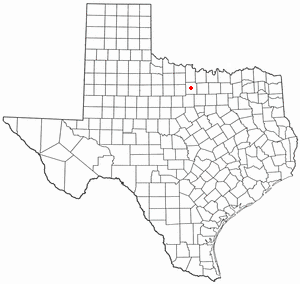
- Location of Jacksboro, Texas

- Coordinates: 33°14′25″N 98°09′31″W
- Country: United States
- State: Texas
- County: Jack

Area
  - Total: 8.09 sq mi (20.95 km^{2})
  - Land: 7.23 sq mi (18.72 km^{2})
  - Water: 0.86 sq mi (2.23 km^{2})
- Elevation: 1,093 ft (333 m)

Population (2020)
  - Total: 4,184
  - Density: 578.9/sq mi (223.53/km^{2})
- Time zone: UTC-6 (Central (CST))
  - Summer (DST): UTC-5 (CDT)
- ZIP code: 76458
- Area code: 940
- FIPS code: 48-37168
- GNIS feature ID: 2410127
- Website: www.cityofjacksboro.com

Jacksboro is a city in Jack County, Texas, in the United States. Its population was 4,184 at the 2020 census. U.S. Highways 281 and 380, and Texas State Highways 114 and 199 intersect at Jacksboro, which is the county seat of Jack County.

== History ==
Jacksboro was first settled in the 1850s, with newcomers attracted by land offers from the Texas Emigration and Land Office. Originally called "Mesquiteville", the community grew up along the banks of Lost Creek and spread out over the pastureland between Lost Creek and the waters of the West Fork of Keechi Creek. It was renamed "Jacksboro" in 1858, when it became the county seat, in honor of brothers William and Patrick Jack, veterans of the Texas Revolution. Regular postal service began in 1859. Jacksboro was located on one route of the Butterfield Overland Mail.

The county was one of the few in Texas to vote against secession before the Civil War. It continued to suffer from Native American raids until Fort Richardson was built and garrisoned in 1870 south of Jacksboro. The town gained national attention in 1871 when two Kiowa chiefs, Satanta and Big Tree, were tried for murder there.

The arrival of the Chicago, Rock Island & Texas Railroad in 1898 increased the town's commercial importance to the surrounding region, enhancing it as a center of trade. The completion of highways and other roads later on also connected the town to other markets.

Fort Richardson State Park, Historic Site, and Lost Creek Reservoir State Trailway is in the southern part of the city. Jacksboro claims to have the first state 4-H club, formed in the 1910s.

On March 21, 2022, an EF3 tornado struck the town causing damage to around 80 homes and heavily damaging the high school. Nine people were injured.

== Geography ==
Jacksboro is located in central Jack County. U.S. Route 281 runs through the city center, leading south 31 miles (50 km) to Mineral Wells and northwest 58 miles (93 km) to Wichita Falls. U.S. Route 380 joins US 281 in the center of Jacksboro, but heads west out of town on Belknap Street, leading 27 miles (43 km) to Graham. US 380 leaves Jacksboro to the southeast with US 281, but then leads east 37 miles (60 km) to Decatur. Fort Worth is 60 miles (97 km) southeast of Jacksboro via US 281 and Texas State Highway 199.

According to the United States Census Bureau, Jacksboro has a total area of 8.1 square miles (20.9 km^{2}), of which 0.86 square miles (2.2 km^{2}) is covered by water. The water area comprises Lake Jacksboro, a reservoir on Lost Creek in the northeast part of the city. Jacksboro is part of the watershed of the West Fork of the Trinity River.

=== Climate ===
The climate in this area is characterized by hot, humid summers and generally mild to cool winters. According to the Köppen climate classification, Jacksboro has a humid subtropical climate, Cfa on climate maps.

Climate data for Jacksboro, Texas (1991–2020 normals, extremes 1941–present)
Month	Jan	Feb	Mar	Apr	May	Jun	Jul	Aug	Sep	Oct	Nov	Dec	Year
Record high °F (°C)	92 (33)	94 (34)	99 (37)	100 (38)	104 (40)	113 (45)	113 (45)	113 (45)	111 (44)	103 (39)	92 (33)	87 (31)	113 (45)
Mean maximum °F (°C)	77.0 (25.0)	80.6 (27.0)	87.6 (30.9)	90.9 (32.7)	95.6 (35.3)	98.9 (37.2)	102.4 (39.1)	103.0 (39.4)	99.0 (37.2)	92.4 (33.6)	82.5 (28.1)	77.3 (25.2)	105.0 (40.6)
Mean daily maximum °F (°C)	55.4 (13.0)	59.4 (15.2)	67.8 (19.9)	75.8 (24.3)	83.2 (28.4)	91.0 (32.8)	95.7 (35.4)	95.8 (35.4)	87.9 (31.1)	77.6 (25.3)	65.7 (18.7)	56.8 (13.8)	76.0 (24.4)
Daily mean °F (°C)	42.5 (5.8)	46.6 (8.1)	54.8 (12.7)	62.7 (17.1)	71.4 (21.9)	79.3 (26.3)	83.6 (28.7)	83.3 (28.5)	75.4 (24.1)	64.5 (18.1)	53.1 (11.7)	44.5 (6.9)	63.5 (17.5)
Mean daily minimum °F (°C)	29.5 (−1.4)	33.9 (1.1)	41.9 (5.5)	49.7 (9.8)	59.6 (15.3)	67.7 (19.8)	71.5 (21.9)	70.8 (21.6)	63.0 (17.2)	51.4 (10.8)	40.4 (4.7)	32.1 (0.1)	51.0 (10.6)
Mean minimum °F (°C)	16.7 (−8.5)	19.6 (−6.9)	25.0 (−3.9)	35.4 (1.9)	45.0 (7.2)	59.5 (15.3)	65.8 (18.8)	63.8 (17.7)	49.6 (9.8)	36.1 (2.3)	24.9 (−3.9)	18.9 (−7.3)	13.5 (−10.3)
Record low °F (°C)	−3 (−19)	−11 (−24)	5 (−15)	27 (−3)	33 (1)	49 (9)	56 (13)	54 (12)	33 (1)	22 (−6)	15 (−9)	−8 (−22)	−11 (−24)
Average precipitation inches (mm)	1.49 (38)	2.26 (57)	2.95 (75)	2.84 (72)	4.29 (109)	4.01 (102)	1.85 (47)	2.18 (55)	3.14 (80)	3.85 (98)	1.86 (47)	1.94 (49)	32.66 (830)
Average precipitation days (≥ 0.01 in)	5.0	5.4	6.9	5.3	8.3	7.0	4.2	5.0	6.3	6.6	5.2	5.4	70.6
Source: NOAA

== Demographics ==
Historical population
Census	Pop.	Note	%±
1880	387		—
1890	751		94.1%
1900	1,311		74.6%
1910	1,480		12.9%
1920	1,373		−7.2%
1930	1,837		33.8%
1940	2,368		28.9%
1950	2,951		24.6%
1960	3,816		29.3%
1970	3,554		−6.9%
1980	4,000		12.5%
1990	3,350		−16.2%
2000	4,533		35.3%
2010	4,511		−0.5%
2020	4,184		−7.2%
U.S. Decennial Census

=== 2020 census ===
As of the 2020 census, Jacksboro had a population of 4,184, a median age of 36.3 years, 21.6% of residents under the age of 18, and 13.5% of residents 65 years of age or older; for every 100 females there were 159.7 males, and for every 100 females age 18 and over there were 176.0 males age 18 and over.

0.0% of residents lived in urban areas, while 100.0% lived in rural areas.

There were 1,221 households in Jacksboro, of which 34.6% had children under the age of 18 living in them. Of all households, 47.6% were married-couple households, 18.8% were households with a male householder and no spouse or partner present, and 28.3% were households with a female householder and no spouse or partner present. About 29.3% of all households were made up of individuals and 13.5% had someone living alone who was 65 years of age or older.

There were 1,506 housing units, of which 18.9% were vacant. The homeowner vacancy rate was 3.8% and the rental vacancy rate was 16.2%.

Racial composition as of the 2020 census
Race	Number	Percent
White	2,773	66.3%
Black or African American	308	7.4%
American Indian and Alaska Native	42	1.0%
Asian	33	0.8%
Native Hawaiian and Other Pacific Islander	2	0.0%
Some other race	655	15.7%
Two or more races	371	8.9%
Hispanic or Latino (of any race)	1,141	27.3%

=== 2000 census ===
At the census of 2000, 4,533 people, 1,382 households, and 954 families resided in the city. The population density was 778.7 inhabitants per square mile (300.7/km^{2}). The 1,559 housing units average 267.8/sq mi (103.4/km^{2}). The racial makeup of the city was 81.95% White, 10.46% African American, 0.57% Native American, 0.31% Asian, 0.02% Pacific Islander, 5.56% from other races, and 1.13% from two or more races. Hispanics or Latinos of any race were 10.74% of the population.

Of the 1,382 households, 33.7% had children under the age of 18 living with them, 53.7% were married couples living together, 11.7% had a female householder with no husband present, and 30.9% were not families. About 28.4% of households were one person and 16.3% were one person aged 65 or older. The average household size was 2.50, and the average family size was 3.06. The age distribution was 21.7% under 18, 13.0% from 18 to 24, 33.1% from 25 to 44, 17.9% from 45 to 64, and 14.3% were 65 or older. The median age was 35 years. For every 100 females, there were 139.0 males. For every 100 females age 18 and over, there were 156.5 males.

The median household income was $30,833, and the median family income was $36,759. Males had a median income of $26,716 versus $20,592 for females. The per capita income for the city was $13,595. About 12.2% of families and 15.0% of the population were below the poverty line, including 16.0% of those under age 18 and 14.4% of those age 65 or over.

== Education ==
The city is served by the Jacksboro Independent School District.

== Notable people ==
- Darrell Lester, former All-American football player at Texas Christian University
- Abe Martin, former head coach and athletic director at Texas Christian University
- Don Massengale, former professional golfer on the PGA Tour
- Rik Massengale, former professional golfer on the PGA Tour
- David Spiller, Texan legislator on the 68th district.

== Gallery ==
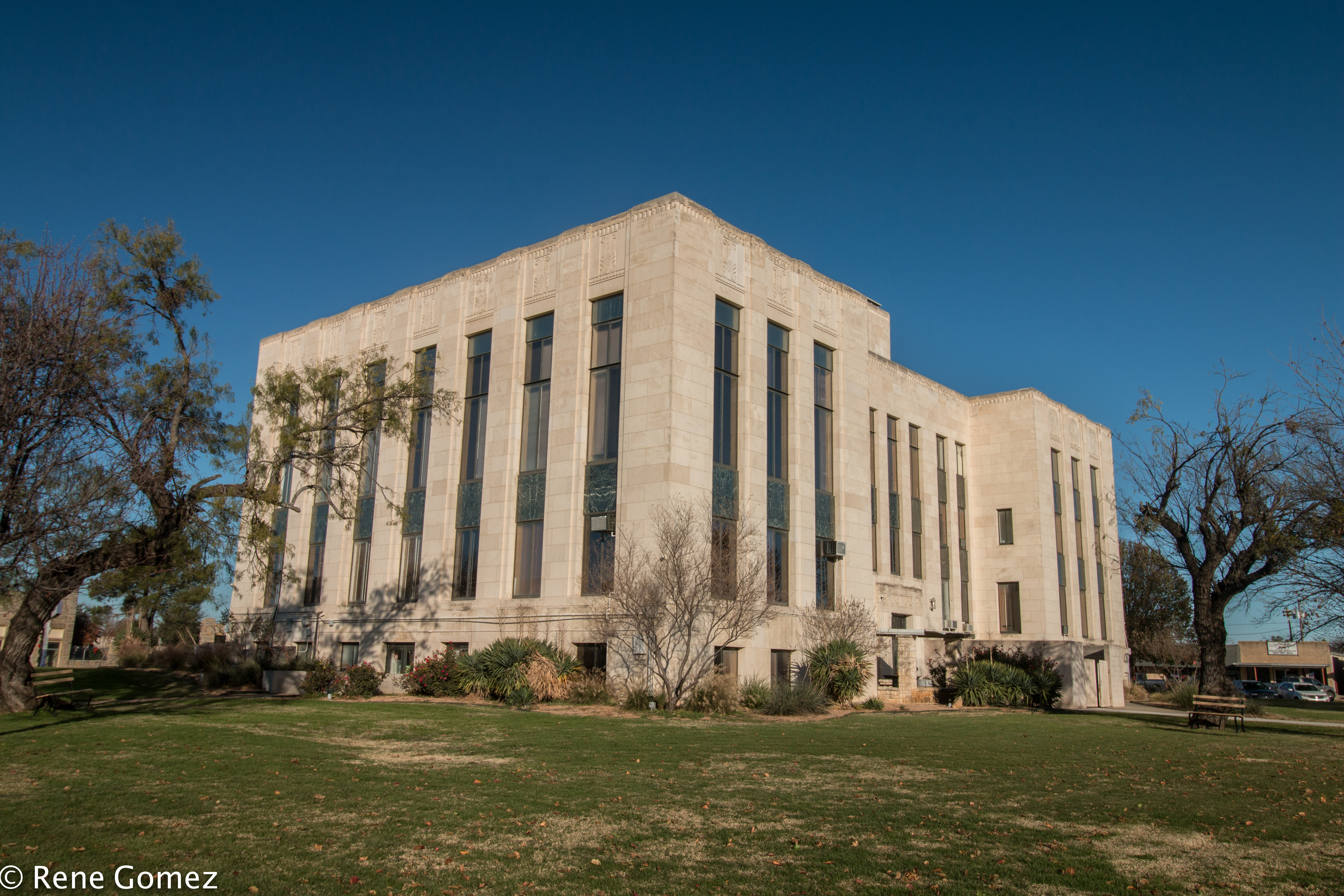
Jack County Courthouse

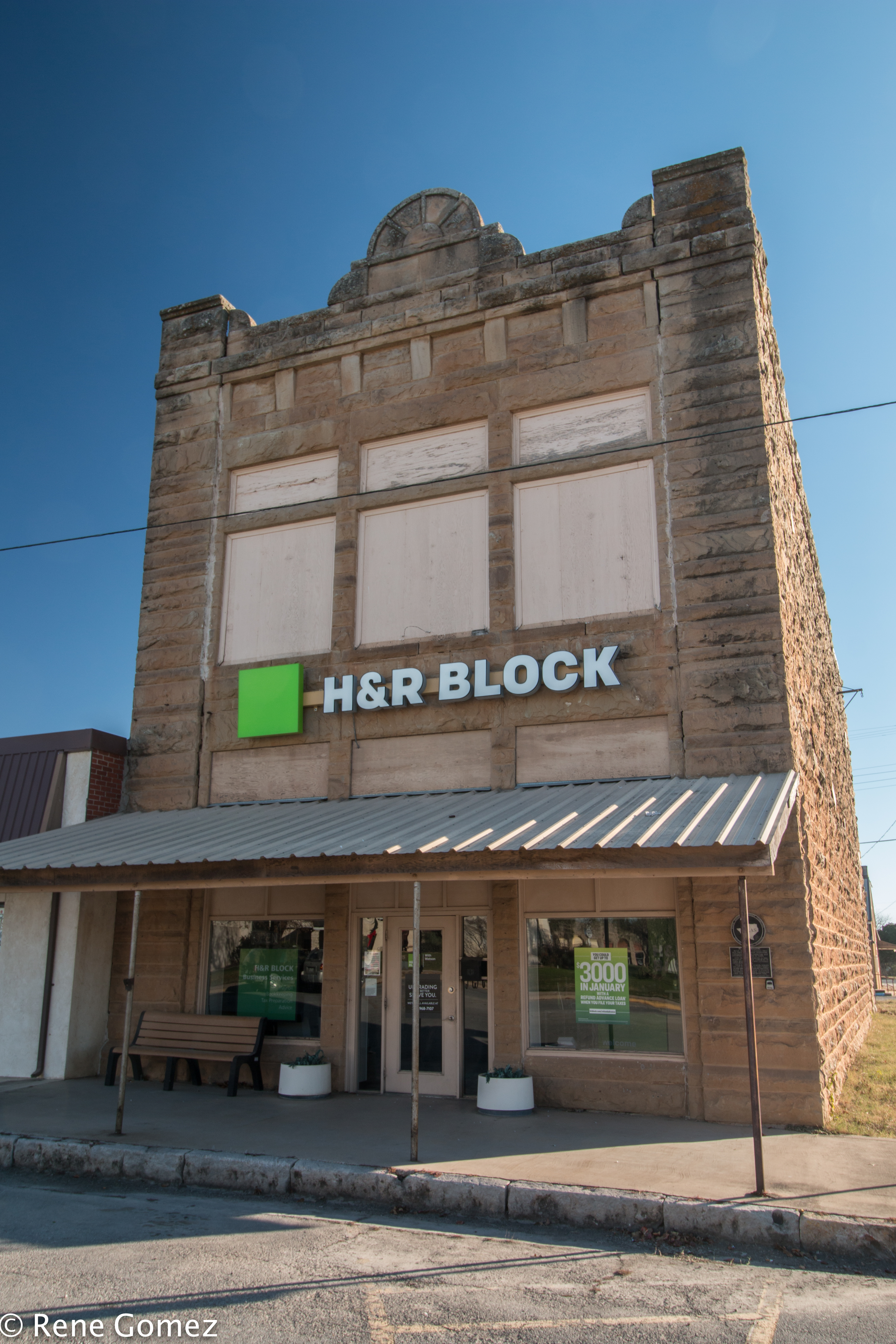
Hess Building

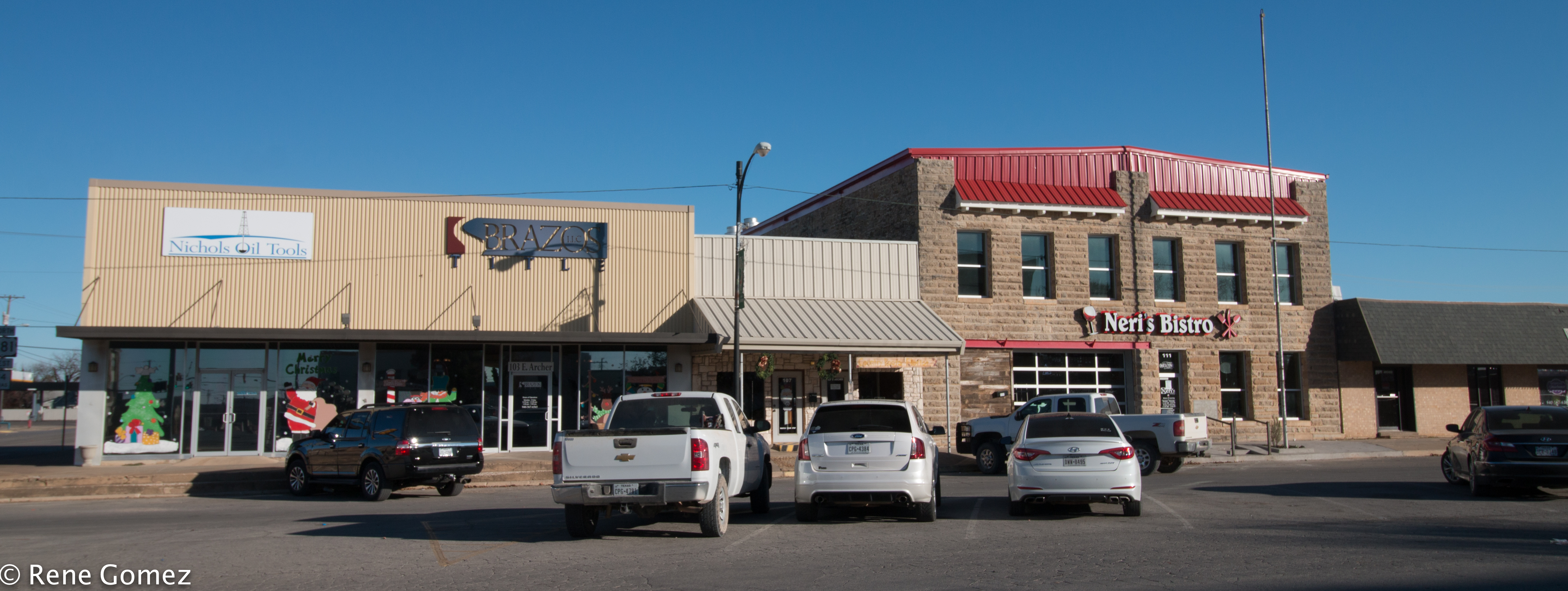
Historic buildings in Jacksboro

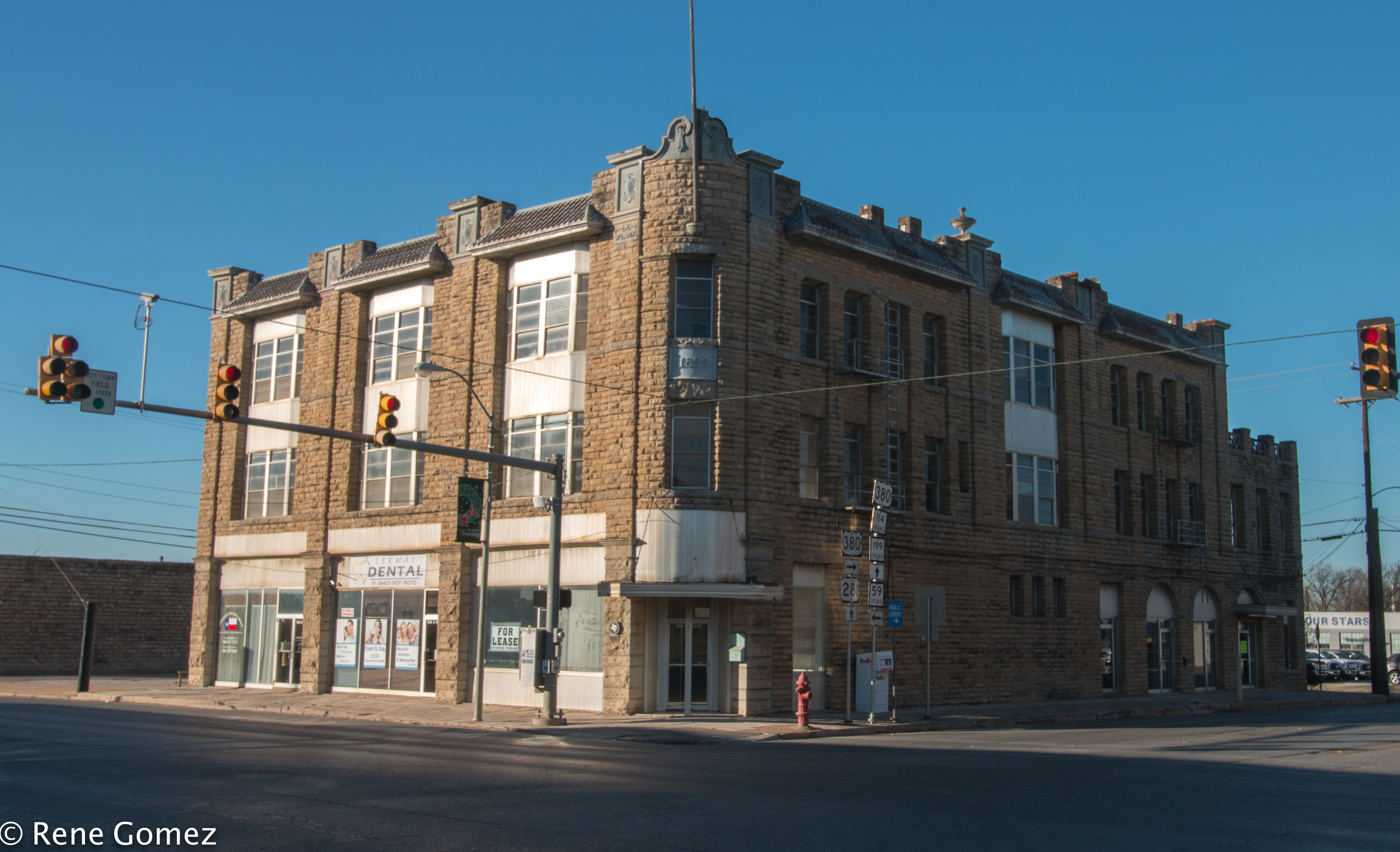
Fort Richardson Hotel

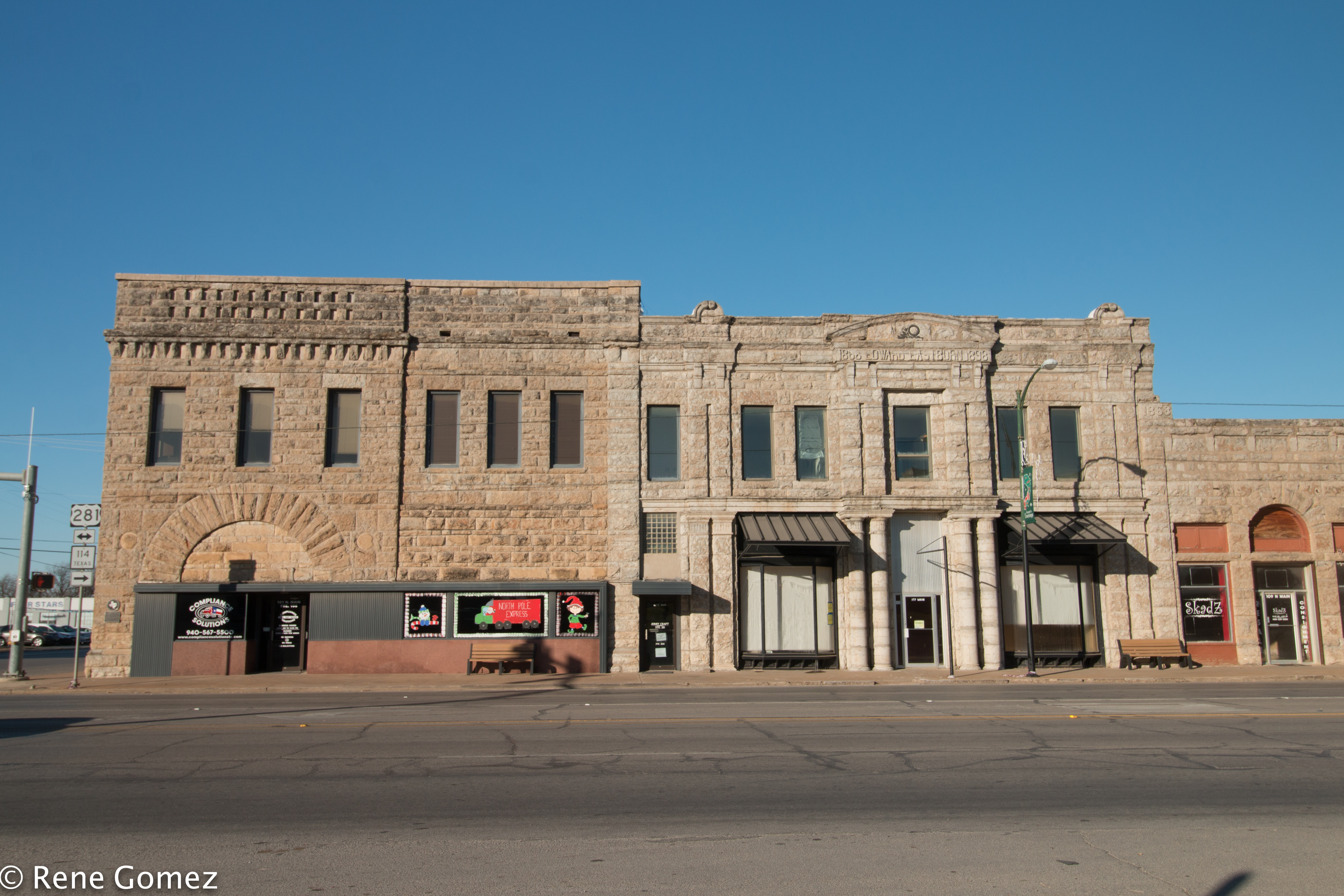
Historic buildings in Jacksboro

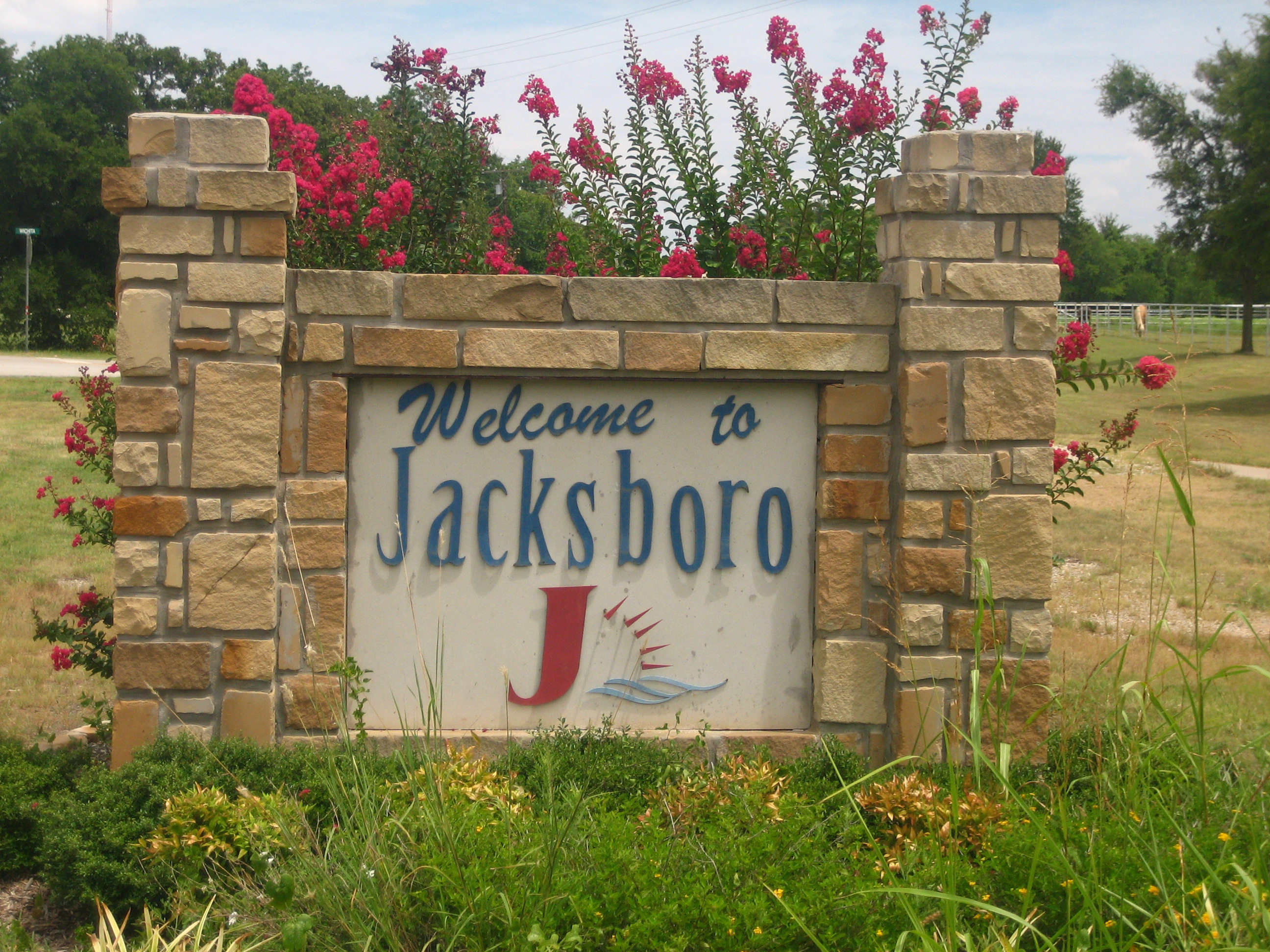
Welcome sign
