= Steve Fitzgerald =

American politician and businessman

Member of the Kansas Senate from the 5th district
- In office January 14, 2013 – September 24, 2018
- Preceded by: Kelly Kultala
- Succeeded by: Kevin Braun

Personal details
- Born: December 26, 1944 (age 81) The Bronx, New York City, U.S.
- Party: Republican
- Spouse: Francie Fitzgerald
- Children: 5
- Education: Command and General Staff College Central Michigan University Saint Martin's University
- Profession: Retired infantry officer, businessman

Military service
- Allegiance: United States
- Branch/service: United States Army
- Rank: Lieutenant colonel

Steve Fitzgerald (born December 26, 1944) is an American politician and businessman who is former a Republican member of the Kansas Senate, representing the 5th district from 2013 until his resignation in 2018. He ran for the Republican nomination in Kansas's 2nd congressional district in 2018 but was defeated by Steve Watkins.

The areas he represents in the Kansas Legislature are Leavenworth, Lansing, Piper, Bonner Springs, Edwardsville (part) as well as part of Kansas City. He is the Vice-Chair of the Ethics, Elections and Local Government Committee and also serves on the Education, Judiciary and Transportation committees.

== Education ==
Fitzgerald was born in the Bronx, New York in 1944. He graduated from the Command and General Staff College with a Master of Military Science Degree. He also attended Central Michigan University where he attained his Master of Business. He graduated from Saint Martin's University in Washington with a Bachelor's in History.

== Military career ==
Fitzgerald served in Viet Nam '68-'70 in the 5th Special Forces Group (Airborne), as a detachment commander in the I Corps MIKE Force; in Germany '75-'78 in the 10th Special Forces Group (Airborne); in Grenada '83 in the 82d Division (Airborne); in the Pentagon; and at Fort Leavenworth in the Combined Arms Center.

=== Awards ===
Fitzgerald's awards include the Combat Infantry Badge, two Bronze Stars, the Purple Heart, and five Meritorious Service Medals.

== Civilian career ==
Upon retiring from the Army, Fitzgerald started a small business which he ran until the 9/11 terrorist attack of 2001. After this attack he closed down the business and went to work for Northrop Grumman as a military analyst and training consultant for the Army. In 2012, he retired from Northrop Grumman upon election into the Kansas Senate.

== Civic Duties ==
=== Leadership ===
In 2010, Fitzgerald co-founded and co-chaired of the Republican Men's Leadership Series, which has trained approximately 250 men throughout Kansas, including several state senators, representatives, county commissioners, mayors, businessmen, and others.

=== Party ===
Fitzgerald was elected Treasurer of Kansas Republican party at the 2008 KS Republican Convention and served until 2010.

=== Education ===
Fitzgerald was Vice President of the Leavenworth School Board from 2005-2009. He was a leader in the bond drive for renovating the schools in the district. He was also a member of the local Catholic school board.

=== Veterans ===
Fitzgerald is the past Commander of Lansing VFW Post 12003 and member of the Leavenworth County Veterans Day Parade Committee. He is a life member of the Veterans of Foreign Wars and Disabled American Veterans as well as a member of American Legion Post 411 and the Special Forces Association.

== Planned Parenthood Controversy ==
In March 2017, Planned Parenthood Great Plains received a donation in Fitzgerald's name. After Fitzgerald learned of the donation, he was angered and compared Planned Parenthood to a concentration camp. In a letter, he wrote, "This as bad, or worse, as having one's name associated with Dachau." Following this response, Planned Parenthood received a flood of donations in Fitzgerald's name.

== Civilization v Barbarism Controversy ==
In his speech during a meeting of the Leavenworth County Republican Party on 2 July 2018, Fitzgerald asserted that "We are being told that Western civilization is the problem in the world. Outside of Western civilization there is only barbarism."

== Personal life ==
Fitzgerald and his wife, Francie, raised five children in Leavenworth, where they have lived since 1985. They now have 19 grandchildren. Their children and grandchildren have graduated from public, private, Catholic, and Lutheran schools and have also been home schooled.

Fitzgerald is a member of the National Rifle Association (NRA) and is a member, third degree, of the Knights of Columbus.
