= Lake Jacksboro =

Lake in Texas, United States

- Location within Texas
- Location: Jacksboro, Texas
- Coordinates: 33°14′25.1″N 98°08′17.2″W
- Basin countries: United States
- Managing agency: Jacksboro, Texas
- First flooded: 1951
- Surface area: 656 acres (265 ha)
- Average depth: 48 feet (15 m)
- References: GNIS

Lake Jacksboro is a lake located in and managed by Jacksboro, Texas. The Jacksboro Municipal Airport is located on the eastern shores of the lake.

== Hydrology ==
Lake Jacksboro has a maximum depth of 30 feet (9.1 m) and an area of 116 acres (0.47 km^{2}).

== History ==
The lake was impounded in 1951.

== Environment ==
The coasts of Lake Jacksboro contains pondweed and water willow.
