= Kevin Braun =

American politician

Member of the Kansas Senate from the 5th district
- In office October 20, 2018 – January 11, 2021
- Preceded by: Steve Fitzgerald
- Succeeded by: Jeff Pittman

Personal details
- Party: Republican
- Education: Friends University (MBA)
- Website: Official website Campaign website

Kevin Braun is an American businessman, military instructor, and politician from the state of Kansas. A Republican, he represented the 5th district of the Kansas Senate, based in Leavenworth and western Kansas City from 2018 to 2021. He lost to Democrat Jeff Pittman in the 2020 election. He lost to Lynn Melton in the 2022 Kansas House of Representatives election for district 36.

== Career ==
In 2018, Steve Fitzgerald resigned from the Senate following an unsuccessful run for Congress, and Braun was appointed by the Leavenworth and Wyandotte County Republican parties to fill the seat. Prior to his appointment, Braun served in the United States Army Reserve for 32 years, including 5 years as an instructor at Fort Leavenworth, and additionally worked at a pharmaceutical company.
