= David French (politician) =

American politician

Member of the Kansas House of Representatives from the 40th district
- In office January 14, 2019 – January 9, 2023
- Preceded by: Debbie Deere
- Succeeded by: David Buehler

Personal details
- Born: Lansing, Kansas, U.S.
- Party: Republican
- Education: Midwestern State University (MBA)

David W. French is an American Republican Party politician who served as a member of the Kansas House of Representatives from the 40th district. Elected in 2018, he assumed office on January 14, 2019, retiring after the 2022 elections.

== Biography ==
Born and raised in Lansing, Kansas, French graduated from Midwestern State University in 1980 with a Master of Business Administration (MBA). Prior to entering politics, French served as an intelligence officer for the United States Army, then as a team lead for Cubic and lastly as an intelligence analyst for Leidos. In 2018, French ran for Kansas State House in the 40th district as a Republican and defeated Democratic incumbent Debbie Deere. French was re-elected in 2020.
