= Red Warbonnet =

Red Warbonnet, or K'ya-been (died 1849) was a Kiowa warrior from Texas, and wasn't the same who fought in the Red River War, (1874-1875) a war on the Southern Plains, in which an intertribal force of Indian fought the United States and the buffalo hunters to protect the last wild herd of buffalo and resist relocation onto Indian reservations.

Red Warbonnet (I) (Tanguadal) died in 1849, according to the Kiowa calendar of a cholera epidemic. Red Warbonnet II, whose Kiowa name was D̶ángúl, was the hereditary owner of the arrow lance (zebat) and owner of the morning star tipi of the Elks band of the Kiowa tribe in the Kiowa Sun Dance circle, and died in 1869 during a raid in Texas. Red Warbonnet's niece, Addlegamah, was the mother of Edgar Keahbone (K'yaitah-kebonemah) who inherited the arrow lance. Edgar kept the arrow lance in his warrior society, Ohumah Lodge until his death in 1951. His wife, Sendehmah, passed the arrow lance down to his eldest son, Mark. Male descendants of the family have replicated the arrow lance and carry it today at Ohumah Lodge, a Kiowa warrior society still in existence. Their dances are held each July.

Prior to the Battle of Palo Duro Canyon, the canyon was a stronghold and resting place of the Kiowa tribe. The Kiowa people knew the canyon intimately, thus explaining their ability to resist capture by McKenzie for such a long period of time. Poor Buffalo, a Kiowa, led his people to the canyon to escape reservation life. Poor Buffalo's band was the last of the Kiowas to be taken in to federal custody.
