= Satanta =

Native American tribe member and Kiowa war chief

- Set:t’aiñde (White Bear)
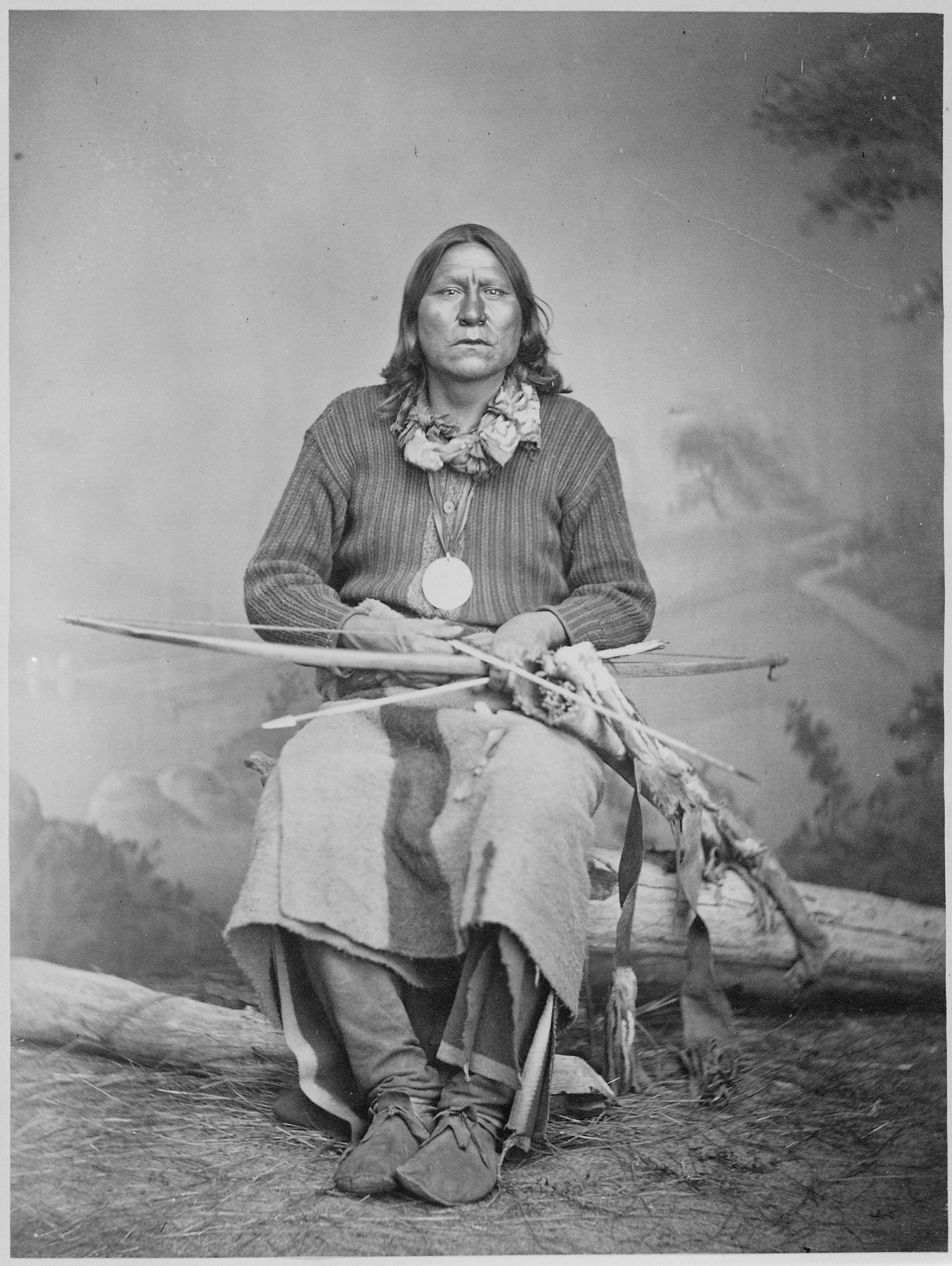
- Satanta (White Bear), Kiowa chief, full-length, seated, holding bow and arrows and showing his presidential medal but not wearing his famous military jacket
- Born: c. 1815
- Died: October 11, 1878 (aged 62–63); Huntsville Unit in Huntsville, Texas
- Resting place: Fort Sill, Oklahoma
- Known for: A chief of the Kiowa Nation, warrior, orator
- Parent: Chief Red Tipi (Father)

Satanta (IPA: /seˈtʰæntə/; Kiowa: Set:t’aiñde IPA: [séʔ.tˀã́j.dè] or White Bear) (c. 1815 – October 11, 1878) was a Kiowa war chief. He was a member of the Kiowa tribe, born around 1815, during the height of the power of the Plains Tribes, probably along the Canadian River in the traditional winter camp grounds of his people.

One of the best known, and last, of the Kiowa War Chiefs, he developed a reputation as an outstanding warrior and in his twenties was made a sub-chief of his tribe, under Dohäsan, as Chief. He fought with him at the First Battle of Adobe Walls, and earned enduring fame for his use of an army bugle to confuse the troops in battle.

Satanta was born the son of Chief Red Tipi and a Spanish captive and spent his youth south of the Arkansas River enjoying the peaceful alliance between the Kiowa and Comanche tribes.

== Orator and warrior ==
One of the best known leaders of his tribe in the 1860s–1870s, Satanta was well known for both his prowess as a warrior, and his soaring oratorical powers. Dohäsan was the principal Chief until his death. Satanta was one of the Chiefs who negotiated several treaties with the American government during the 1860s, including the Little Arkansas Treaty (1865) and the Medicine Lodge Treaty (1867). In the latter, Satanta agreed that the Kiowas would live on a reservation. When the tribe failed to move onto it, Satanta was seized by General George Custer and held as a hostage until the forced removal and migration took place.

== At the First Battle of Adobe Walls ==
Satanta is primarily remembered in military history as the sub-chief to Dohäsan at the First Battle of Adobe Walls. While Dohäsan, helped by Satank and Guipago, was in command of the combined Kiowa, Kiowa-Apache, and Comanche forces which opposed Kit Carson and his New Mexico forces in November 1864, Satanta is remembered for ably assisting him in repeated charges which drove the New Mexico volunteers from the field, and for his repeated blowing of an army bugle, which confused the troops under Carson. Satanta would counter Carson's bugler with trumpeted commands of his own, on a day where the Plains Tribes managed to drive a US Army detachment from the field. The Indian forces assembled from their nearby winter encampments vastly outnumbered the Army detachment, which retreated in good order.

== Medicine Lodge Treaty ==
At Medicine Lodge, Satanta, a tall, muscular man, came to be known as the "Orator of the Plains."

Like most treaties of the time, these agreements failed utterly to bring peace on the frontier. The Kiowa and Comanche accepted the treaty offerings and promised to no longer raid outside their reservation. But shortly after signing, the chiefs went into northern Texas on raiding missions, violating the treaty. In fact the Red River War erupted shortly afterwards. Unhappy that the reservation had reduced the Kiowa lands to nearly the size of Connecticut to accommodate their wigwams, the chiefs began leading their young men on raiding parties off the reservations. In fact, records have documented over 250 innocent farmers, ranchers, women and children murdered and kidnapped by the Kiowa and Comanche warriors during the 1860s and 1870s. This situation, unstable in and of itself, worsened significantly with the death of Dohäsan, the last Kiowa Chief (over the entire Kiowa People) in 1866.

Without his binding personal leadership, Kiowa unity dissolved as a number of subchiefs, Tene-angopte, and, on the other side, Satanta and Guipago (Gui-pah-gho, Lone Wolf), struggled for power and to fill his place. The competition between the three set off a wave of raids across the southern plains from Kansas to Texas during the fall of 1866 and into 1867.

In one instance Satanta and a joint Kiowa-Comanche war party raided into the Texas panhandle and, after killing James Box, captured the man's wife and four children, whom they sold to the army at Fort Dodge, Kansas.

It is alleged that at Fort Dodge that Satanta, begging for liquor, accidentally drank animal medicine and was given pills that only made him even more sick. In revenge Satanta burned hay belonging to Mr. Coryell opposite the fort and killed three woodchoppers as well.

== Fort Zarah ==
Satanta's fame grew after he managed to defuse a confrontation between the Kiowa and the US Cavalry near Fort Zarah, Kansas in 1867. A young Kiowa warrior was killed at the civilian camp near the army Fort, and the Kiowa massed to avenge his death. The cavalry, in turn, massed to protect the civilians. Satanta managed to defuse the confrontation, but nonetheless, later in the day, the Cavalry attacked the Kiowa encampment. Satanta then led the defense of the camp by the warriors while the women and children retreated.

== Warren Wagon Train Raid ==
In 1871 Satanta led several attacks on wagon trains in Texas. His undoing came with the Warren Wagon Train Raid on May 18, 1871. Immediately prior to that attack, the Indians had allowed an Army Ambulance with a small guard to pass unharmed; in it was General William Tecumseh Sherman, but Mamanti, the medicine man, had advised the other chiefs to wait for a richer loot.

The wagon train had attempted to fight the war party by shifting into a ring formation, and all the mules were put into the center of the ring. Despite this, the warriors captured all of the supplies in the train, killing and mutilating seven of the wagoner's bodies. Five men however, managed to escape. As soon as Col. Ranald S. Mackenzie learned of the incident, he informed Sherman. Sherman and Mackenzie searched for the warriors responsible for the raid.

Satanta foolishly bragged of his, Satank (Sitting Bear), and Ado-ete (Big Tree)'s involvement of the raid, and, in spite of Guipago's intervention (the head chief came in well equipped with loaded rifles and revolvers, fit to fight for his friend's liberty, but had to surrender in front of the massive presence of military troops) Sherman personally arrested him.

== Trial of Satanta and Big Tree ==
General Sherman ordered the trial of Satanta and Big Tree, along with Satank making them the first Native American Leaders to be tried for raids in a US court. Sherman ordered the three Kiowa sub-chiefs taken to Jacksboro, Texas, to stand trial for murder.

Satank had no intention of allowing himself to be humiliated by being tried by the white man's court, and told the Tonkawa scouts before the three were to be transported to Fort Richardson that they should tell his family they would be able to find his body along the trail.

Satank refused to get in the wagon, and after the soldiers threw him in, he hid his head under his red blanket (worn as a sign of his membership in the Koitsenko). The soldiers apparently believed the old Chief was hiding his face because of humiliation, but in reality, he was gnawing his wrists to the bone so that he could get out of the chains they had put on him. He began singing his death song, and when his hands were free, stabbed one of his guards with a knife he had secreted in his clothes, and managed to wrestle the man's rifle from him. Satank was shot to death before he could manage to fire.

His body lay unburied in the road, with his people afraid to claim it, for fear of the Army, though Col. Ranald S. Mackenzie assured the family they could safely claim Satank's remains. Nonetheless, they were never claimed, and he lies now at Fort Sill.

At his trial Satanta warned what might happen if he was hanged: "I am a great chief among my people. If you kill me, it will be like a spark on the prairie. It will make a big fire - a terrible fire!" Satanta was found guilty of murder and sentenced to death. Judge Soward ordered that Satanta "be taken by the Sheriff of Jack County and hanged until he is dead, dead, dead and God have mercy on his soul." However, the same judge also wrote to Texas Governor Edmund J. Davis recommending commutation to life in prison.

Governor Davis, under enormous pressure from leaders of the so-called Quaker Peace Policy, decided to overrule the court and the punishment was changed to life imprisonment. Satanta was freed after two years of imprisonment at the Huntsville State Penitentiary in Texas.

== Release, recapture, and death at Huntsville ==
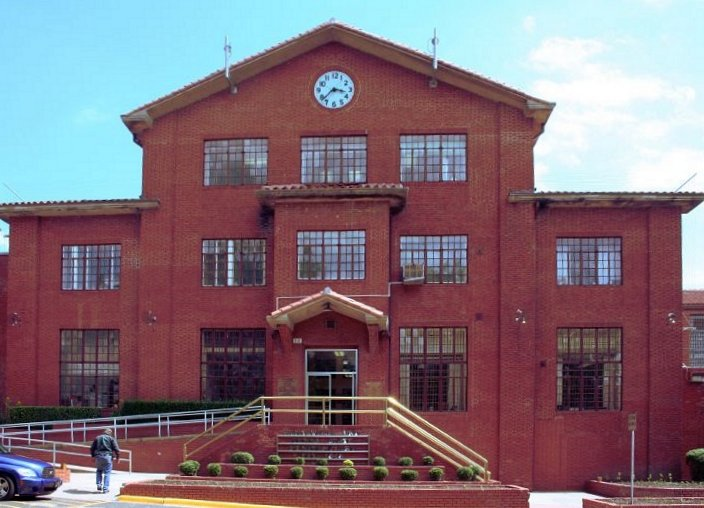
Huntsville Unit, where Satanta was incarcerated

After a long and hard dealing with the U.S. government officers, in 1872 Guipago was allowed to meet his friend Satanta and the young war chief Ado-ete in St. Louis, and only after this he accepted to go to Washington with some other Kiowa, Comanche, Cheyenne, Arapaho, Wichita, and Delaware chiefs and talk about peace with President Ulysses S. Grant; after Satanta and Ado-ete were temporarily paroled, Guipago led the Kiowa delegation to Washington in September 1872, and got Indian Commissioner E. P. Smith's promise to release the two captives. Satanta and his companion were definitively released only in September 1873, Guipago having made clear to Indian agent James M. Haworth that his patience was now at its end.

Soon after their release, Satanta and Ado-ete, along with Guipago and Tsen-tainte (White Horse) were involved in attacking buffalo hunters and were present at the raid on Adobe Walls. But the Kiowa People deny Satanta was involved in that battle, other than being present. He yielded up his war lance and other symbols of leadership to younger, more aggressive men. He was also present at the Battle of the Upper Washita.

His presence at the battle violated his parole, and was likely the reason the government called for his arrest. He surrendered in October 1874, and was returned to the state penitentiary at Huntsville, Texas. Guards reported that Satanta, forced to work on the road, would stare for hours at the traditional hunting grounds of his people, and seemed to wither away. In his book, the History of Texas, Clarance Wharton reports of Satanta in prison

After he was returned to the penitentiary in 1874, he saw no hope of escape. For a while he was worked on a chain gang which helped to build the Missouri–Kansas–Texas Railroad. He became sullen and broken in spirit, and would be seen for hours gazing through his prison bars toward the north, the hunting grounds of his people.

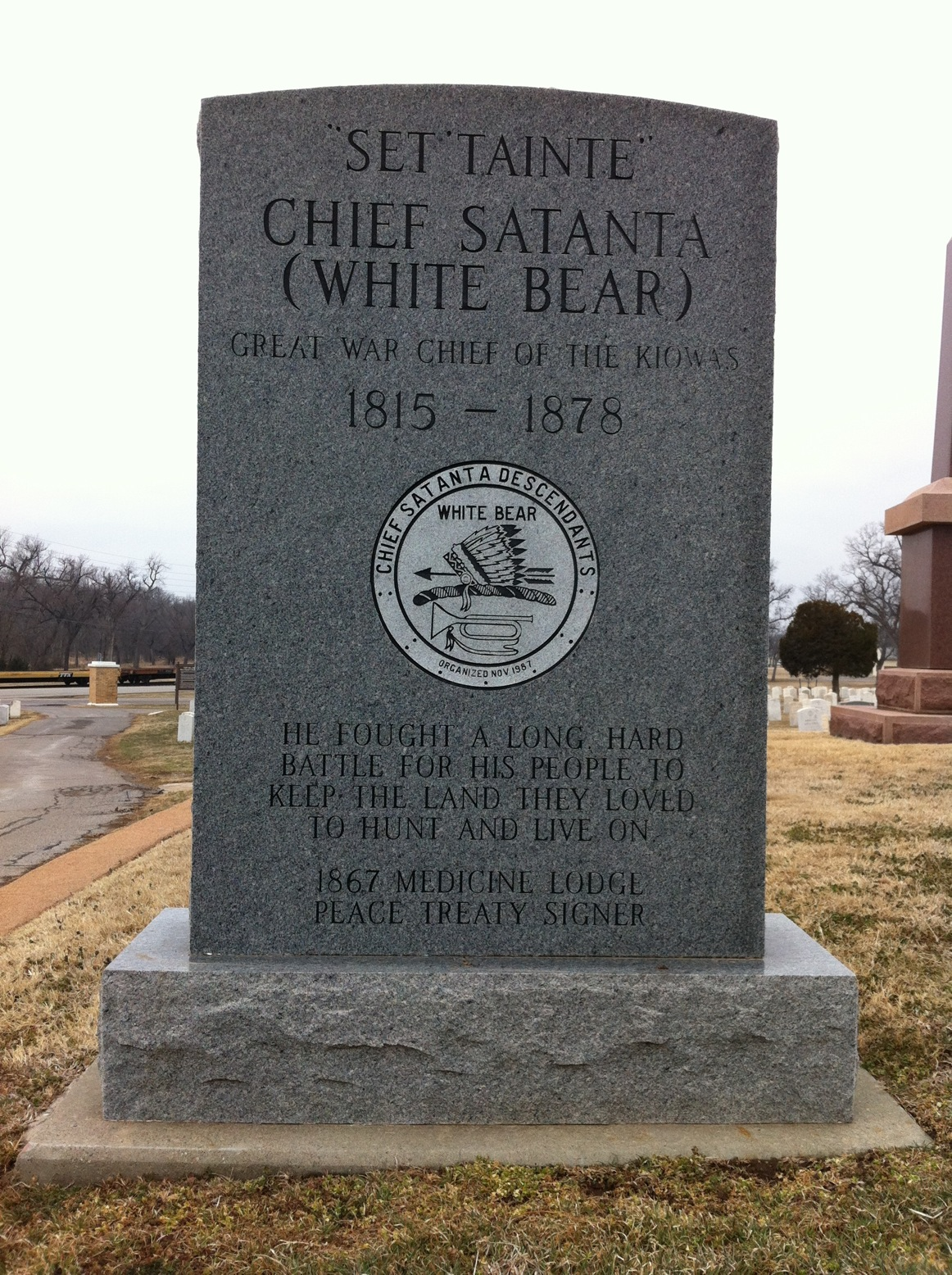
Satanta was buried in the prison cemetery, now known as the Captain Joe Byrd Cemetery in Huntsville, until 1963

Satanta is reported to have killed himself while incarcerated by jumping from a window on 11th October, 1878.

Satanta was originally buried in the prison cemetery in Huntsville. In 1963 his grandson, an artist named James Auchiah, received permission to transfer Satanta's remains to Fort Sill, Oklahoma.

On October 7, 2000, Satanta's shield, bow and bow case, and arrows and quiver were returned to Fort Sill and dedicated by a ceremony that included the Fort Sill commander and Kiowan armed services veterans.

The character of Blue Duck in Larry McMurtry's Pulitzer Prize winning novel Lonesome Dove was partially based on the life and death of Satanta.

The actor Rodolfo Acosta played Satanta in 1959 in the third episode of the ABC western television series, The Rebel, starring Nick Adams.

== See also ==
- Texas-Indian Wars
- Warren Wagon Train Raid
- First Battle of Adobe Walls
- Second Battle of Adobe Walls
- Guipago
- Satank
- Dohasan
- Tene-angopte
