= Tony Barton (politician) =

American politician (born 1961)

Member of the Kansas House of Representatives from the 41st district
- In office January 12, 2015 – January 9, 2017
- Preceded by: Melanie Meier
- Succeeded by: Jeff Pittman

Personal details
- Born: June 27, 1961 (age 65) Boston, Massachusetts, U.S.
- Party: Republican
- Spouse: Arlene K. Barton
- Children: 4
- Profession: Pastor

Tony Barton (June 27, 1961) is a former American politician. He was a member of the Kansas House of Representatives from the 41st District, serving till 2017. He is a member of the Republican Party. He has a lifetime rating of 83% from the American Conservative Union. Tony has been married to Arlene Barton for over 30 years and has 4 children and 6 grandchildren. Barton is African-American.
