= Fort Zarah =

Military fortification in 19th-century Kansas, U.S.

Coordinates: 38°24′10″N 98°43′50″W

Fort Zarah was a fort in Barton County, Kansas, northeast of present-day Great Bend, Kansas, that was used from 1864 to 1869.

== Dates of operation ==
In July 1864, because of frequent attacks from indigenous tribes in the area, Camp Dunlap was established 2 miles east of present-day Great Bend, Kansas, where the Santa Fe Trail crossed Walnut Creek. At first the camp was a series of tents and dugouts on the riverbank close to the Rath Ranch (trading post). However work immediately started on a more permanent facility about 100 yards from the dugouts and renamed Fort Zarah. In 1866 it was replaced by a second Fort Zarah built about 1/2 mile up river. Ft. Zarah was abandoned in 1869.

== Place in history ==
Even though Fort Zarah had a short life, it saw its share of skirmishes with local Native American tribes and colorful characters including George Armstrong Custer, Wild Bill Hickok, Buffalo Bill Mathewson, Buffalo Bill Cody, Kit Carson, and the Kiowa chief Satank a.k.a. Sitting Bear.

== Name ==
Fort Zarah was established in 1864 by General Samuel R. Curtis and named for his son, Major H. Zarah Curtis who had been killed in the Baxter Springs, Kansas massacre, October 6, 1863. Major Curtis was one of 90 Union soldiers killed by Quantrill's Raiders who were disguised as Union soldiers.

== Zarah town ==
A small town called Zarah grew up around Fort Zarah. At its peak, Zarah had a hotel, two saloons, a blacksmith shop, a livery stable, a general store, a post office, and several homes. Several thousand Texas cattle were wintered there. The town of Zarah is now a wheat field 3 miles east of Great Bend. The last citizen left Zarah in 1875 about 6 years after the fort was abandoned.

== Ranch/trading post at Walnut Creek ==
Fort Zarah was established near a ranch (trading post) where the Santa Fe Trail crossed Walnut Creek. The ranch was established in 1855 and was known as the Allison/Boothe Ranch, the Peacock Ranch, the Rath Ranch, or the Douglas trading post, depending on who operated it. The ranch was destroyed by Indians in May 1868.

== See also ==
- Kansas Forts and Posts
