= Kansas's 5th Senate district =

American legislative district

Kansas's 5th State Senate district
Senator
| Jeff Klemp; R–Lansing |
- Demographics: 71% White; 13% Black; 9% Hispanic; 2% Asian; 5% Other
- Population (2018): 74,997

Kansas's 5th Senate district is one of 40 districts in the Kansas Senate. It has been represented by Republican Jeff Klemp since 2025.

== Geography ==
District 5 covers parts of Leavenworth and Wyandotte Counties, stretching from Bonner Springs, Edwardsville, and western Kansas City in the south to Lansing and Leavenworth in the north.

The district overlaps with Kansas's 2nd and 3rd congressional districts, and with the 33rd, 36th, 40th, 41st, and 42nd districts of the Kansas House of Representatives. It borders the state of Missouri.

== Recent election results ==
=== 2020 ===
In 2018, incumbent Republican Steve Fitzgerald resigned from the Senate, and pharmaceutical operative Kevin Braun was chosen to serve the remainder of Fitzgerald's term.

2020 Kansas Senate election, District 5
| Party | Candidate | Votes | % |
|---|---|---|---|
| Democratic | Jeff Pittman | 16,753 | 53.1 |
| Republican | Kevin Braun (incumbent) | 14,818 | 46.9 |
| Total votes | | 31,571 | 100 |
| Democratic gain from Republican | | | |

=== 2016 ===
2016 Kansas Senate election, District 5
Primary election
| Party | Candidate | Votes | % |
|---|---|---|---|
| Democratic | Bill Hutton | 2,570 | 74.1 |
| Democratic | Donald Terrien | 899 | 25.9 |
| Total votes | | 3,469 | 100 |
General election
| Republican | Steve Fitzgerald (incumbent) | 13,336 | 51.0 |
| Democratic | Bill Hutton | 12,828 | 49.0 |
| Total votes | | 26,164 | 100 |
| Republican hold | | | |

=== 2012 ===
2012 Kansas Senate election, District 5
Primary election
| Party | Candidate | Votes | % |
|---|---|---|---|
| Republican | Steve Fitzgerald | 2,298 | 61.5 |
| Republican | Mark Gilstrap | 1,441 | 38.5 |
| Total votes | | 3,739 | 100 |
General election
| Republican | Steve Fitzgerald | 12,803 | 51.5 |
| Democratic | Kelly Kultala (incumbent) | 12,040 | 48.5 |
| Total votes | | 24,843 | 100 |
| Republican gain from Democratic | | | |

=== Federal and statewide results ===
| Year | Office | Results |
|---|---|---|
| 2020 | President | Trump 50.3 – 46.9% |
| 2018 | Governor | Kelly 51.5 – 40.3% |
| 2016 | President | Trump 51.1 – 41.3% |
| 2012 | President | Romney 52.9 – 45.1% |
