= Margaret Poisal =

19th Century Arapaho interpreter in Colorado

- Born: Margaret (Walking Woman) Poisal c. 1834; Cherry Creek, now in Colorado
- Died: between 1883 and 1892
- Citizenship: Northern Arapaho
- Occupation: Interpreter
- Years active: 1851–1883
- Spouse: Thomas Fitzpatrick
- Parent(s): John Poisal and Snake Woman
- Relatives: Chief Niwot (Chief Left Hand), maternal uncle

Margaret Poisal (c. 1834–between 1883 and 1892) was "the only woman who was an official witness, interpreter, and consultant at many meetings and treaty councils held along or in close proximity to the Santa Fe Trail." The daughter of French Canadian trapper John Poisal and Snake Woman (Arapaho), Poisal was educated at a convent school. She married Thomas Fitzpatrick, an Indian agent, and they worked together negotiating peace between Native American tribes and the United States government. After Fitzpatrick died, Poisal continued to work as an interpreter and peacemaker.

== Background ==
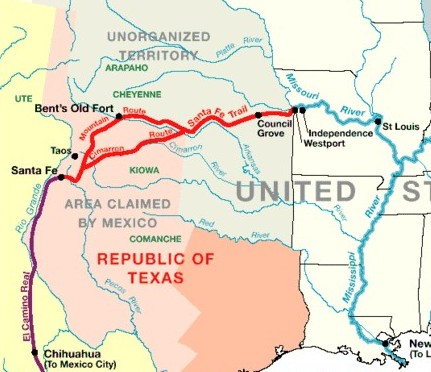
1845 Santa Fe Trail and Native tribal lands

Poisal grew up during a period where Arapaho and Cheyenne ranched across the Great Plains. In the early 19th century, fur trappers and traders crossed into the Western frontier. The Arapaho and Cheyenne developed partnerships with trappers and trading companies who exchanged goods for buffalo pelts along the Santa Fe Trail and other trails. American pioneers migrated west to California and Oregon beginning in 1842, which resulted in reduction of buffalo herds and the destruction of the range. Lakota Sioux moved into the North Platte area, which reduced available resources. Due to the loss in game, the Arapaho and other Native Americans had to find other ways to get food: by bartering with traders, negotiating with Indian agents for food and goods, and assessing tolls of food to allow pioneers to cross their land, or stealing.

Many more white people came west during the Pike's Peak Gold Rush of 1859 (and the earlier California Gold Rush (1848–1855)). Buffalo hunters and gold prospectors headed westward, followed by homesteaders and railroad builders. European Americans traveled through Native American hunting and ceremonial lands as they crossed the plains and mountains to the west on the Oregon and other trails. Trying to find a way for native and non-native people to coexist, treaties were negotiated and re-negotiated between the United States government and Native Americans.

The Arapaho, who were allied with the Cheyenne, lived on lands north of the Arkansas River and to the Boulder Valley. The Arapaho people's territory extended from the foothills of the Rocky Mountains to the Central and Southern Plains. They came to know white men who traded along the Santa Fe Trail. They bartered with goods, including guns, in exchange for fur pelts. The Arapaho treated men and women as equal partners when managing their family affairs, leading sacred ceremonies, and determining the extent to which their family implemented tribal policies.

== Early life ==
Margaret Poisal (Walking Woman) was born in 1834 to John Poisal, a French Canadian hunter and trapper, and Snake Woman, niece of Chief Niwot (Left Hand). (Note: According to the United States Federal Census, Poisal was born at Cherry Creek in 1834, when it was part of the Missouri Territory / unorganized territory. Her mother was also known as Shoshone Woman.) Her father worked for the Bent brothers (of Bent's Fort on the Santa Fe Trail in Colorado). The Poisals had five children who lived in the European-American and Arapaho societies: Margaret (b. 1834), Mary (b. 1838), Robert (b. 1838), Mathilda (b. 1845) and John, Jr. Margaret was one of the first Arapaho girls to receive a formal American education. She attend a convent school in St. Louis, Missouri.

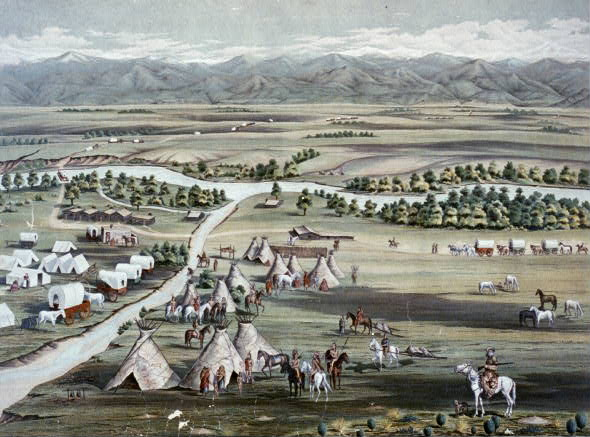
Cherry Creek and South Platte River in 1859, present-day Denver

Her father raised cattle and horses at the mouth of Cherry Creek in 1857. By 1860, John Poisal was a trader living at the confluence of Cherry Creek and the South Platte River in Cherry Creek, Colorado (now part of Denver, Colorado). With him were Snake Woman, their sons, and daughters Mary and Matilda. Subject to prejudice and hatred of miners and white settlers, the family was attacked at least once. Snake Woman was attacked by two drunken white men, and John Poisal risked his life saving her from sexual assault. Margaret's brother John was educated and worked as a trader, speaking English, Arapaho, and Spanish. Margaret's father died in 1861 in a cabin on Cherry Creek. Snake Woman and the remaining children who lived at home joined the Arapaho at Sand Creek in Colorado. The Poisal children survived the Sand Creek massacre. They received compensation of 640 acres each from the Treaty of the Little Arkansas of 1865.

== Marriages and children ==
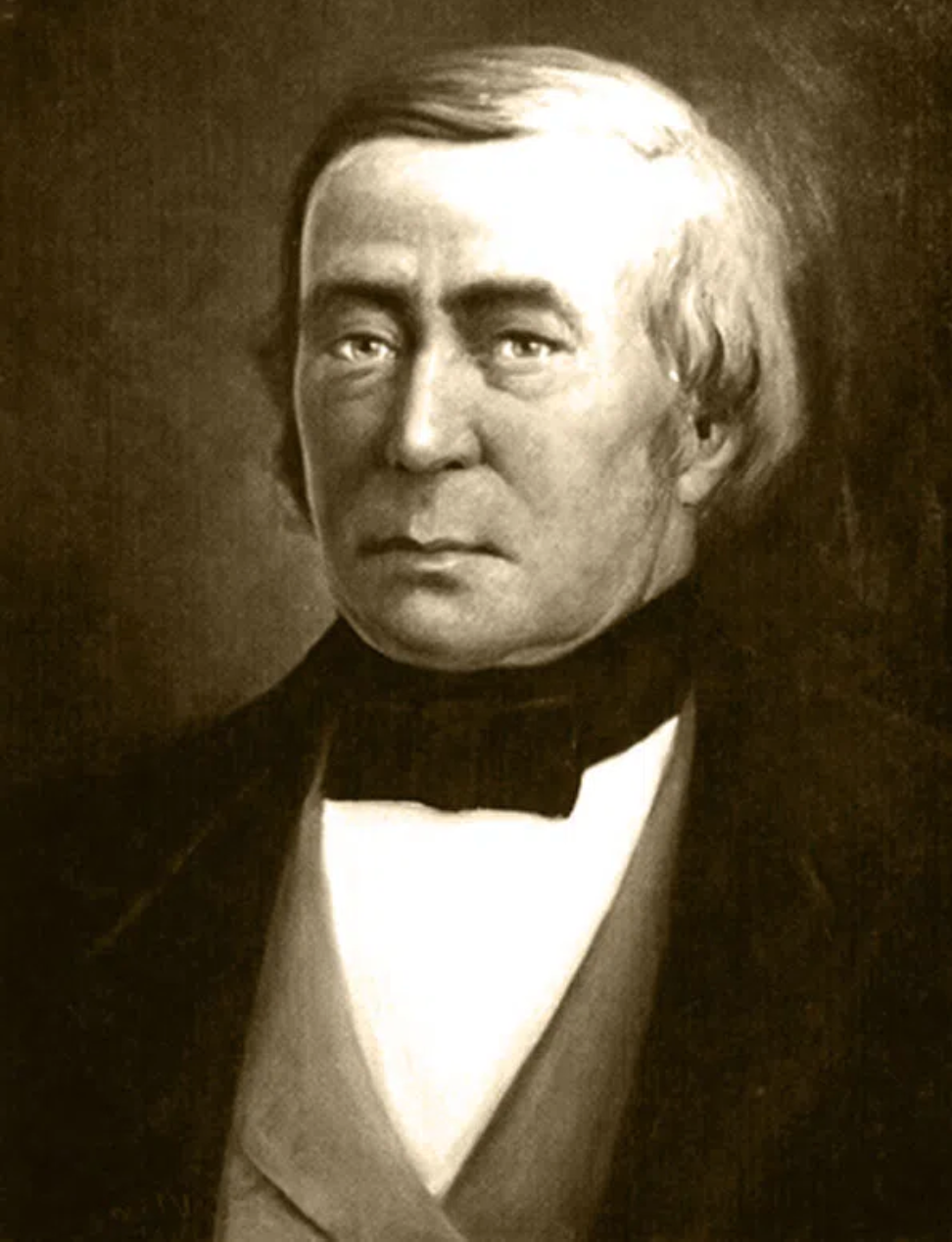
Thomas Fitzpatrick (1799–1854) trapper and Indian Agent

She married Thomas Fitzpatrick (Broken Hand) in November 1849. He was a fur trader, scout, and Indian agent to the Southern Arapaho and Cheyenne people. Their children were Andrew Jackson (Jack) Fitzpatrick who was born in 1850 and Virginia Tomasine Fitzpatrick born in 1854. The Fitzpatricks worked together for "peaceful and mutually beneficial relationships" between Arapaho and white Americans.

The Fitzpatricks settled in Westport, Missouri and from there traveled periodically to Native American villages on the Great Plains and along the Santa Fe Trail. The Fitzpatricks traveled to Washington, D.C., with a delegation of Southern Arapaho and Southern Cheyenne tribal leaders in the fall of 1853. At the time, Margaret was pregnant with their second child. Thomas died in early February 1854. Their daughter, Virginia (Jennie) Tomasine, was born after his death.

Poisal inherited an estate of two lots and houses in Westport, Missouri and more than $10,000 (equivalent to $349,963 in 2024). She married Lucious J. Wilmot, a gardener, on February 2, 1856. (Note: Lucious J. Wilmot's surname is spelled Wilmott in Thompson's article, but in Fowler's book and public records it is Wilmot. He is often called L. J. Wilmot and in his marriage record his name is spelled Lewis J. Wilmot.) They lived in Leavenworth, Kansas with Margaret's children by 1860. That year they lived with Snake Woman and her family in Denver for a time, to take advantage of the Pike's Peak Gold Rush. Wilmot was a trader in Denver. The couple divorced after Wilmot mishandled their finances, which had resulted in the loss of most of Poisal's inheritance from Thomas Fitzpatrick. By 1865, Poisal and her children lived in Leavenworth with her sister Mary (Poisal) Keith and brother-in-law B.F. Keith. She and her children retained the Wilmot surname.

Jack and Jennie attended St. Mary's Mission School by 1866. Jennie married John Meagher, an Irish immigrant. Poisal lived with her daughter in 1877. She married for a third time to a man with the surname of Adams by 1883 when she was an interpreter at the Medicine Lodge treaty council and she was living on lands she received from the Arapaho (or that she received in 1865 as reparation due to the Sand Creek massacre).

== Treaties ==
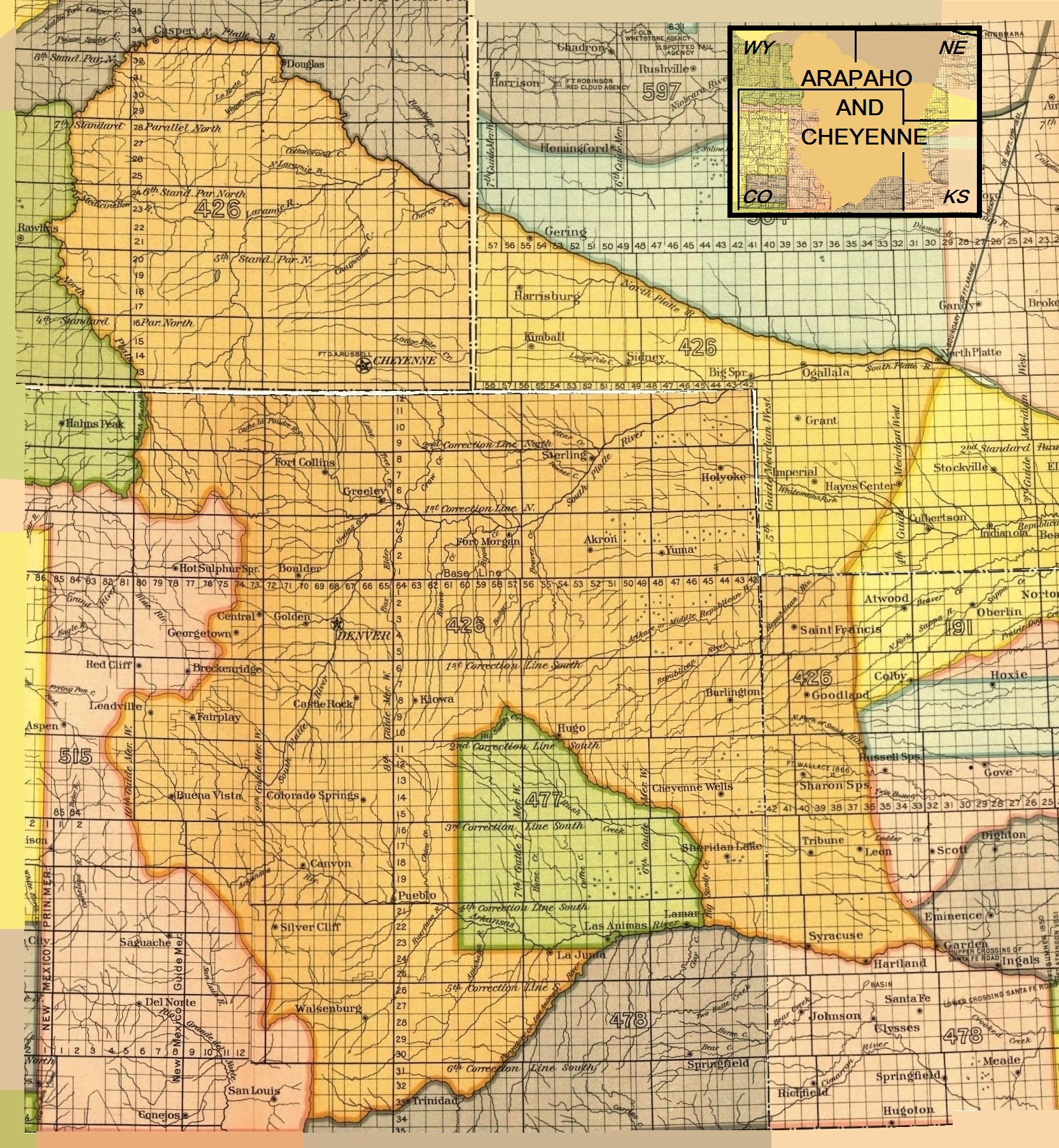
Arapaho and Cheyenne territory from the Treaty of Fort Laramie (1851)

Thomas Fitzpatrick was an organizer and leader of the Fort Laramie Treaty Council of 1851. Poisal attended the meetings, having women attend the meetings meant as a sign of trust for a peaceful outcome by Native Americans. Eight tribes with around 10,000 Native Americans attended the council. The natives agreed to stop attacking travelers on trails that passed through traditional ceremonial and hunting grounds, including the Oregon Trail, and to cease warfare with other tribes. The government agreed to provide annuities for 50 years. After the treaty was signed, it was never officially recognized by the federal government and the United States Senate reduced the amount and length of the term of the annuities without consulting with the parties that formed the treaty. The treaty was also violated by both Native Americans and European Americans. Fitzpatrick was a key party to the Fort Atkinson Treaty Council of 1853 in present southwest Kansas.

Following Fitzpatrick's death, Poisal represented the interests of the Southern Arapahos in treaty councils and other meetings held along or near the Santa Fe Trail. An interpreter, witness, and consultant, she was the only woman engaged in these activities at that time in the United States.

After the Pike's Peak Gold Rush, Indian lands were encroached upon by white miners and settlers, many of whom did not want to form relationships with native peoples. Therefore, there was an increase in hostilities with or by the Southern Cheyenne and Arapaho until 1875. Poisal's uncle, Chief Left Hand, was killed in November 1864 during the Sand Creek massacre. Snake Woman and her daughter Mary were at the encampment during the massacre. Many of the Arapaho men were on a hunting trip at the time.

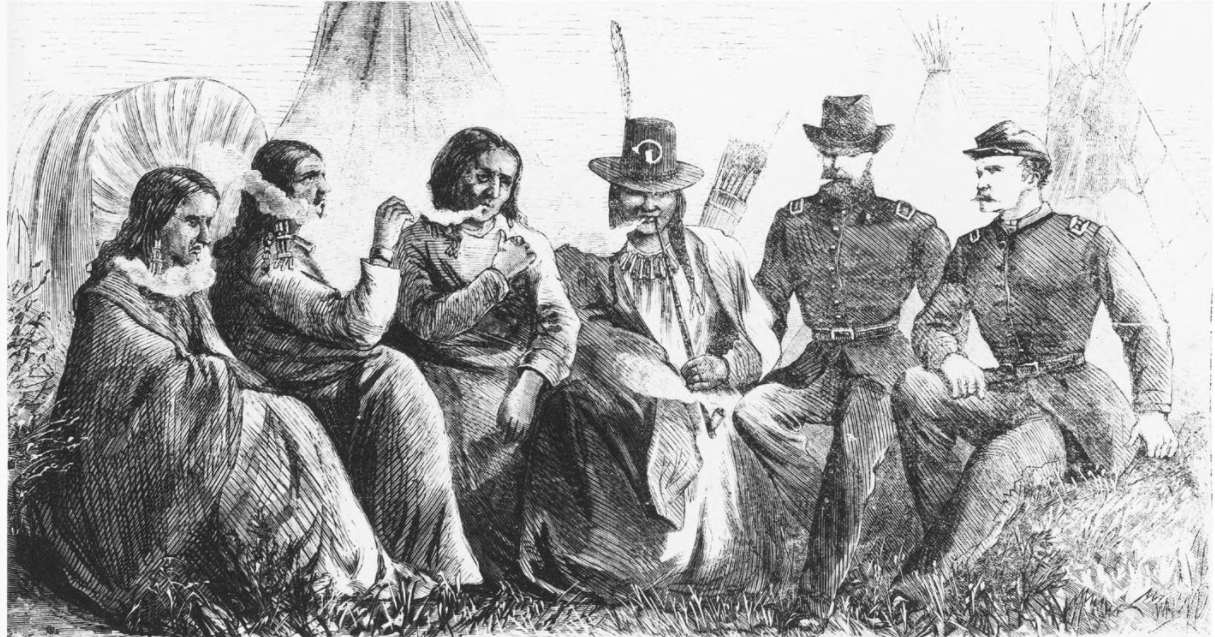
Margaret Poisal Adams with Arapaho chiefs at the Medicine Lodge Creek treaty council, 1867. Margaret (1834 to ca. 1884) was the interpreter for Little Raven and other chiefs. She was the Arapahos' interpreter at the 1865 treaty council. The participants are smoking a pipe to sanctify the proceedings. Sketch by Theodore R. Davis, "Medicine Lodge Creek Treaty of 1867", Harper's Weekly, June 2, 1867, National Anthropological Archives, Smithsonian Institution

In mid October 1865, she attended the Little Arkansas Treaty Council. She acted as a translator and negotiated for restitution for the Sand Creek massacre. Samuel A. Kingman, present at the treaty council, described her as a "the creature of many loves, the subject of many sorrows."

She worked as a negotiator and peacemaker over several years. As a result, uprisings in Colorado and Kansas were averted. In the end, Native Americans were moved to Indian Territory (present-day Oklahoma), giving up their hunter-gatherer tradition and to become farmers.

== Later years and death ==
Poisal was the interpreter for the Arapaho delegation to Washington, D.C., in 1883. It was her last known appearance. She did not appear to be employed as an interpreter again, likely due to alcohol abuse or because it was easier to hire interpreters after a generation of Arapaho children had been educated in English-speaking schools. She died by 1892, according to her brother John's estate papers.

She may have lived with her daughter Virginia Tomasine "Jennie" Fitzpatrick Meager in Indian Territory in her later years. Jennie was a public school teacher in Oklahoma, which prevented the need to send children to "off reservation" boarding schools.

== Sources ==
- Fowler, Loretta (2012). Wives and Husbands: Gender and Age in Southern Arapaho History. University of Oklahoma Press. p. 35. ISBN 978-0-8061-8559-0.
- Fowler, Loretta (Fall 2015). "Arapaho and Cheyenne Perspectives: From the 1851". American Indian Quarterly. 39 (4). doi:10.1353/aiq.2015.a595116. ProQuest 1717290976.
- Thompson, Alice Ann (November 2019). "Margaret Poisal "Walking Woman" Fitzpatrick/Wilmott/McAdams". Wagon Tracks. 34: 1 – via University of Mexico digital repository.
