= Curse of the Boulder Valley =

"The beauty will be its undoing."

The Curse of Boulder Valley, also known as Niwot's Curse, is attributed to Chief Niwot, who is said to have first stated it upon meeting the first white gold seekers to visit what is now known as the Boulder Valley in Boulder County, Colorado. According to the chief, the curse of the valley was its breathtaking landscape.

People seeing the beauty of this valley will want to stay, and their staying will be the undoing of the beauty.

Niwot was the leader of the Southern Arapaho. The visitors were encamped at what the Arapaho considered to be a sacred site, Valmont Butte, some four miles to the north east of what is now central Boulder, Colorado. Niwot and his closest elder braves, Bear Head and Many Whips, rode out to the site where the new arrivals had decided to camp, near the place where Boulder Creek releases from the Front Range onto the Great Plains. Some see the Curse as portentous of the settling of not only the Boulder Valley, but of the entire Western United States.

== Europeans come to Boulder Valley ==
In fall 1858, led by Captain Thomas Aikins, a group of gold prospectors, part of the Colorado Gold Rush, came from Fort St. Vrain, 30 miles east. As they made camp at the site where Boulder Creek rushes down from Nederland to meet Sunshine Creek and flow onto the Great Plains, Niwot and his braves met them.

They had ridden from Valmont Butte to greet them in peace and to admonish them to leave.

Chief Niwot, it is said, as eloquent and capable as he was with the English language learned from his brother-in-law, his sister's husband, the trapper John Poisal, told the European erstwhile settlers the area was cursed. He is said to have told them the Curse of Boulder Valley is: "People seeing the beauty of this valley will want to stay, and their staying will be the undoing of the beauty." As the conversation heightened, he proceeded to threaten them with a visitation by War Party if they did not leave.

== Battle looms and a dream brings initial peace ==
Aikins and his men refused to leave and prepared to do battle against the Arapaho. At some point, Bear Head and Many Whips headed back to the Arapaho encampment to raise a War Party while the Chief lingered.

While they were away, Aikins and his group took steps to avoid hostilities by focusing personal attention on Chief Niwot, plying him with canned beans and salt pork, and getting him drunk. As a result, when Bear Head and Many Whips and the War Party returned, Niwot was advocating peace with the gold-seeking Caucasians, yet tension reigned.

After three tense days, the threat of battle remained in the air. Then, abruptly, Niwot rode into Aikins’ camp once more. He had come to tell them one of his Arapaho shamans had received a dream from the Great Spirit the night before. In the dream, a flood covered the earth and swallowed the Arapaho people, while the whites survived. Niwot interpreted this to mean that gold seekers would flood his homeland, and he could do nothing to stop it. Peace with the whites, Niwot realized, was the only way his people would avoid being swept away by the flood.

Starting then, Niwot and his fellow chief Little Raven, who had recently welcomed white settlers to the Denver gold camps, maintained their stance of peaceful coexistence with the newly arrived Europeans, at least for the time being. He was killed shortly thereafter in the notorious Sand Creek massacre.
