= Cherokee Nation v. Hitchcock =

- Supreme Court of the United States

Decided December 1, 1902
- Full case name: Cherokee Nation v. Hitchcock
- Citations: 187 U.S. 294 (more)

Holding
- The US Congress has the power to pass legislation that controls the actions and property of tribal states without their consent.

Court membership
- Chief Justice Melville Fuller Associate Justices John M. Harlan · David J. Brewer; Henry B. Brown · George Shiras Jr. Edward D. White · Rufus W. Peckham; Joseph McKenna

Case opinion
- Majority: White, joined by unanimous

Cherokee Nation v. Hitchcock, 187 U.S. 294 (1902) was a US Supreme Court case that decided the US Congress has the power to pass legislation that controls the actions and property of tribal states without their consent. The Cherokee Nation brought this case against the Secretary of the Interior because the Secretary authorized mineral and oil leases on Cherokee land, an action Congress had authorized by legislation. The Cherokee Nation argued that this action violated the treaty rights promised by the US to their Indian nation. In their decision, the Court stated this was out of the Court’s power as it was a question for the legislative branch to determine, not the judicial.

The Supreme Court affirmed and asserted that the June 28th, 1898 Act of the US Congress and previous US Supreme Court case Stephens v. Cherokee Nation, 174 U.S. 445 gave the US Congress full control over the Cherokee Nation. The case of Cherokee Nation v. Hitchcock was submitted to the US Supreme Court on October 23, 1902, and was decided on December 1, 1902.

== Background ==
To help guide the US Supreme Court’s ruling in the case of Cherokee Nation v. Hitchcock, there were a few cases that would ultimately lead the Court to their decision.

In 1831, Chief Justice John Marshall ruled that the Cherokee Nation had no jurisdiction in US Supreme Court case Cherokee Nation v. Georgia. This case was brought to the Court’s attention on the grounds that the Cherokee Nation wanted to fight laws that would restrict Indian rights within their territory. Chief Justice Marshall made clear that the judicial branch of the United States placed the authority to make decisions about the rights of Native American tribes in the hands of the federal government. The rationale for this case that would go to influence future tribal cases (including Cherokee Nation v. Hitchcock) was based on the US Supreme Court ruling that the federal government should have the self-imposed authority to protect Native American tribes from states and foreign nations

The Cherokee Nation brought Cherokee Nation v. Hitchcock to the Court to challenge the validity of the 1898 Curtis Act. This act weakened and dissolved Indian territory tribal governments by abolishing tribal courts. In turn, Native American tribes in the United States were required to bring any cases to a US federal court.

Both the ruling of Cherokee Nation v. Georgia (1831) and the 1898 Curtis Act played an important role in the US Supreme Court’s decision in Cherokee Nation v. Hitchcock (1902). The Curtis Act forced the Cherokee Nation to bring cases to the federal courts and Chief Justice Marshall’s decision just insinuated the fact that Congress oversaw what happened to the land and rights of Native Americans in the US, not the Courts.

== The Impact and Significance on Future Cases ==
One year after Cherokee Nation v. Hitchcock was decided, the US Supreme Court was given the case of Lone Wolf v. Hitchcock (1903). This case, argues historian Blue Clark, is historically one of the US Supreme Court’s strongest statements about the place of Native Americans in society within the United States. The Lone Wolf decision was based on the ruling in Cherokee Nation v. Hitchcock. In the Lone Wolf decision, the US Supreme Court held that Congress had full administrative power over Indian tribal property. The land of the tribes involved could be seized while they had little legal rights except the ability to protest. This regulation was ruled to be out of the US Court’s judicial oversight and was placed into the hands of the US Congress.

What is most emphasized, by historian David E. Wilkins, about the US Supreme Court’s decision in Cherokee Nation v. Hitchcock is how little judicial rights Native Americans had in the United States. It was not the tribes, individuals, or states who had a say in the way in which tribal rights were to be protected. It was because of the decision of the Courts that gave Congress the power to legislate what happened to tribes in the United States
