= Medicine Lodge Peace Treaty Site =

- U.S. National Register of Historic Places
- U.S. National Historic Landmark
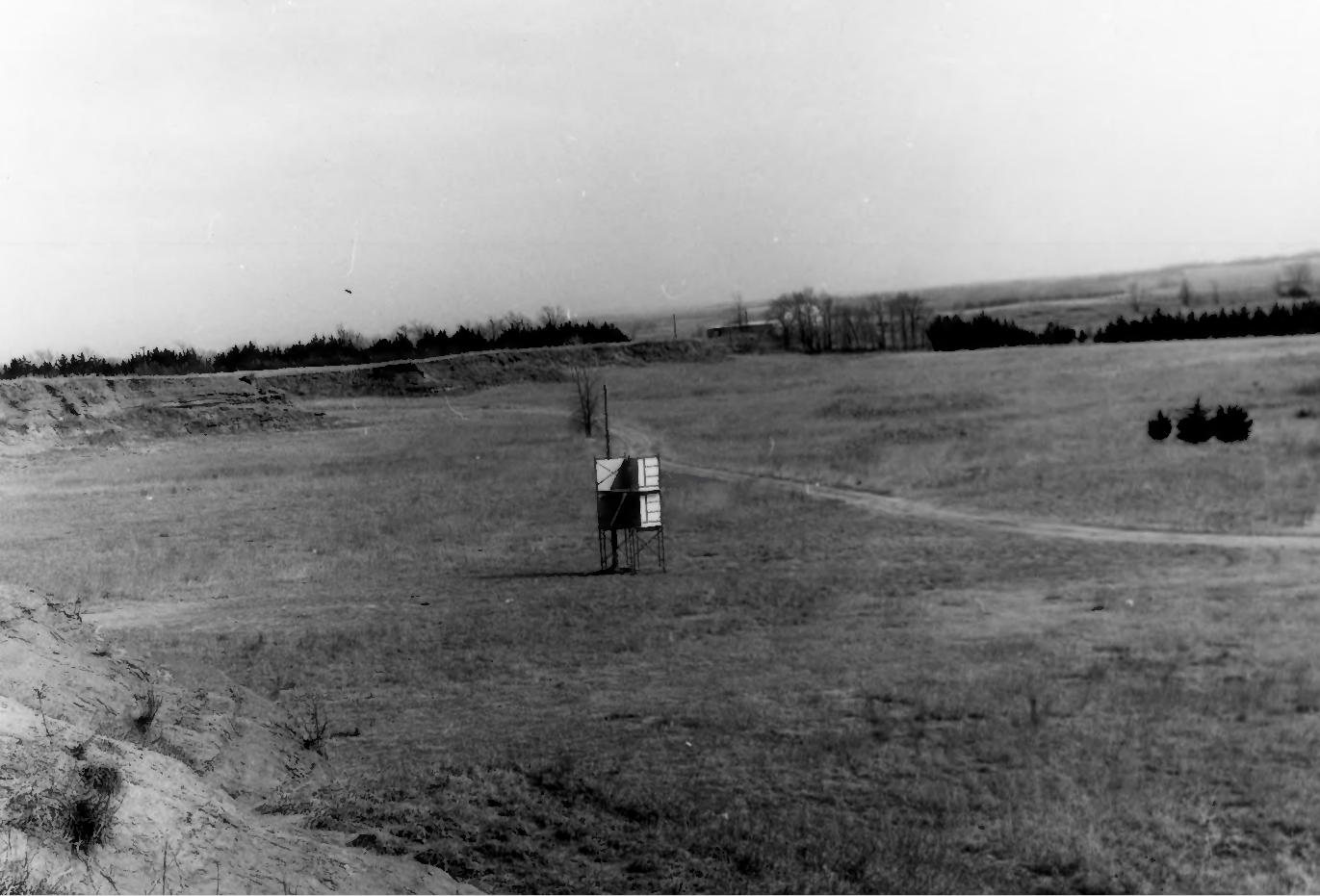
- The natural amphitheater east of the site, 1969

- Location within Kansas Location within the United States
- Nearest city: Medicine Lodge, Kansas
- Coordinates: 37°15′55″N 98°35′35″W
- Built: 1867
- NRHP reference No.: 69000059

Significant dates
- Added to NRHP: August 4, 1969
- Designated NHL: August 4, 1969

The Medicine Lodge Peace Treaty Site was the location in present-day Kansas of the signing of the Medicine Lodge Treaty in October 1867 by the United States government with major Western Native American tribes of the region. The treaty, whose peace lasted less than one year, was the first in which the United States formally adopted the policy of attempting to acculturate Native Americans to European ways. The treaty site is located south of Medicine Lodge, around the confluence of Elm Creek and the Medicine Lodge River; it was designated a U.S. National Historic Landmark in 1969 and is listed on the National Register of Historic Places.

== Description and history ==
The Medicine Lodge Peace Treaty Site is located roughly south of the modern city of Medicine Lodge. The actual site of negotiations and treaty signings is located near the confluence of Elm Creek and the Medicine Lodge River, with Native American encampments (containing as many as 5,000 people) spread along both banks of the river. The area is in a combination of public and private ownership, and is most readily viewed at a distance, from the Memorial Peace Park about 1 1/2 miles to the east. There is a natural amphitheater facing west in the park, which is the site of periodic reenactments of the treaty events.

In the years following the American Civil War, westward expansion into the plains of what are now Kansas and Nebraska placed pressure on the local Native American tribes, who contested the encroachments on their land with violence. A punitive expedition led by General Winfield Scott Hancock destroyed a Cheyenne village west of Medicine Lodge in the spring of 1867, leading to calls by peace-favoring politicians for negotiations toward some sort of long-term agreement with the affected tribes. The basic policy proposals worked out in the summer of 1867 included the settlement those tribes on reservations, where they could eventually be "civilized" and learn to adopt the ways of white men.

The Indian Peace Commission was created by Congress in July 1867, given powers to agree to terms. In negotiations held here in October 1867, five tribes agreed to terms, which were formalized in three separate treaties known collectively as the Medicine Lodge Treaty. The peace was to be short-lived, as neither side effectively held its end of the bargains, and by the following summer violence was again flaring up.

The site of the treaty meetings was identified by a Kiowa spectator of the events in 1922 as being a grove of elm trees on the south bank of Elm Creek, just east of the Medicine Lodge River.

== See also ==
- National Register of Historic Places listings in Barber County, Kansas
- List of National Historic Landmarks in Kansas
