= List of United States Supreme Court cases, volume 187 =

Supreme Court of the United States
- Interactive map of Supreme Court of the United States
- 38°53′26″N 77°00′16″W
- Established: March 4, 1789; 237 years ago
- Location: Washington, D.C.
- Coordinates: 38°53′26″N 77°00′16″W
- Composition method: Presidential nomination with Senate confirmation
- Authorised by: Constitution of the United States, Art. III, § 1
- Judge term length: life tenure, subject to impeachment and removal
- Number of positions: 9 (by statute)
- Website: supremecourt.gov

This is a list of cases reported in volume 187 of United States Reports, decided by the Supreme Court of the United States in 1902 and 1903.

== Justices of the Supreme Court at the time of volume 187 U.S. ==
The Supreme Court is established by Article III, Section 1 of the Constitution of the United States, which says: "The judicial Power of the United States, shall be vested in one supreme Court . . .". The size of the Court is not specified; the Constitution leaves it to Congress to set the number of justices. Under the Judiciary Act of 1789 Congress originally fixed the number of justices at six (one chief justice and five associate justices). Since 1789 Congress has varied the size of the Court from six to seven, nine, ten, and back to nine justices (always including one chief justice).

When the cases in volume 187 were decided the Court comprised the following nine members:

Portrait	Justice	Office	Home State	Succeeded	Date confirmed by the Senate (Vote)	Tenure on Supreme Court
	Melville Fuller	Chief Justice	Illinois	Morrison Waite	July 20, 1888 (41–20)	October 8, 1888 – July 4, 1910 (Died)
	John Marshall Harlan	Associate Justice	Kentucky	David Davis	November 29, 1877 (Acclamation)	December 10, 1877 – October 14, 1911 (Died)
	David Josiah Brewer	Associate Justice	Kansas	Stanley Matthews	December 18, 1889 (53–11)	January 6, 1890 – March 28, 1910 (Died)
	Henry Billings Brown	Associate Justice	Michigan	Samuel Freeman Miller	December 29, 1890 (Acclamation)	January 5, 1891 – May 28, 1906 (Retired)
	George Shiras Jr.	Associate Justice	Pennsylvania	Joseph P. Bradley	July 26, 1892 (Acclamation)	October 10, 1892 – February 23, 1903 (Retired)
	Edward Douglass White	Associate Justice	Louisiana	Samuel Blatchford	February 19, 1894 (Acclamation)	March 12, 1894 – December 18, 1910 (Continued as chief justice)
	Rufus W. Peckham	Associate Justice	New York	Howell Edmunds Jackson	December 9, 1895 (Acclamation)	January 6, 1896 – October 24, 1909 (Died)
	Joseph McKenna	Associate Justice	California	Stephen Johnson Field	January 21, 1898 (Acclamation)	January 26, 1898 – January 5, 1925 (Retired)
	Oliver Wendell Holmes Jr.	Associate Justice	Massachusetts	Horace Gray	December 4, 1902 (Acclamation)	December 8, 1902 – January 12, 1932 (Retired)

== Citation style ==
Under the Judiciary Act of 1789 the federal court structure at the time comprised District Courts, which had general trial jurisdiction; Circuit Courts, which had mixed trial and appellate (from the US District Courts) jurisdiction; and the United States Supreme Court, which had appellate jurisdiction over the federal District and Circuit courts—and for certain issues over state courts. The Supreme Court also had limited original jurisdiction (i.e., in which cases could be filed directly with the Supreme Court without first having been heard by a lower federal or state court). There were one or more federal District Courts and/or Circuit Courts in each state, territory, or other geographical region.

The Judiciary Act of 1891 created the United States Courts of Appeals and reassigned the jurisdiction of most routine appeals from the district and circuit courts to these appellate courts. The Act created nine new courts that were originally known as the "United States Circuit Courts of Appeals." The new courts had jurisdiction over most appeals of lower court decisions. The Supreme Court could review either legal issues that a court of appeals certified or decisions of court of appeals by writ of certiorari.

Bluebook citation style is used for case names, citations, and jurisdictions.

- "# Cir." = United States Court of Appeals
  - e.g., "3d Cir." = United States Court of Appeals for the Third Circuit
- "C.C.D." = United States Circuit Court for the District of . . .
  - e.g.,"C.C.D.N.J." = United States Circuit Court for the District of New Jersey
- "D." = United States District Court for the District of . . .
  - e.g.,"D. Mass." = United States District Court for the District of Massachusetts
- "E." = Eastern; "M." = Middle; "N." = Northern; "S." = Southern; "W." = Western
  - e.g.,"C.C.S.D.N.Y." = United States Circuit Court for the Southern District of New York
  - e.g.,"M.D. Ala." = United States District Court for the Middle District of Alabama
- "Ct. Cl." = United States Court of Claims
- The abbreviation of a state's name alone indicates the highest appellate court in that state's judiciary at the time.
  - e.g.,"Pa." = Supreme Court of Pennsylvania
  - e.g.,"Me." = Supreme Judicial Court of Maine

== List of cases in volume 187 U.S. ==
Case Name	Page & year	Opinion of the Court	Concurring opinion(s)	Dissenting opinion(s)	Lower Court	Disposition
Ambrosini v. United States	1 (1902)	Fuller	none	none	N.D. Ill.	reversed
Schwartz v. Duss	8 (1902)	McKenna	none	Fuller	3d Cir.	affirmed
Robinson Co. v. Belt	41 (1902)	Brown	none	none	8th Cir.	affirmed
Turpin v. Lemon	51 (1902)	Brown	none	none	C.C.D.W. Va.	affirmed
Baker v. Baldwin	61 (1902)	Fuller	none	none	Mich.	dismissed
Kansas City S.B. Ry. Co. v. Herman	63 (1902)	Fuller	none	none	Kan.	affirmed
Dreyer v. Illinois	71 (1902)	Harlan	none	none	Ill.	affirmed
Iowa v. Rood	87 (1902)	Brown	none	none	Iowa	dismissed
American Sch. of M.H. v. McAnnulty	94 (1902)	Peckham	none	none	C.C.W.D. Mo.	reversed
Romig v. Gillett	111 (1902)	Brewer	none	none	Sup. Ct. Terr. Okla.	reversed
Bird v. United States	118 (1902)	McKenna	none	none	D. Alaska	affirmed
Jacobi v. Alabama	133 (1902)	Fuller	none	none	Ala.	dismissed
Reid v. Colorado	137 (1902)	Harlan	none	none	Colo.	affirmed
Reid v. Jones	153 (1902)	Harlan	none	none	C.C.D. Colo.	affirmed
Home for Incur. v. City of New York	155 (1902)	Harlan	none	none	N.Y. Sup. Ct.	dismissed
Raub v. Carpenter	159 (1902)	Fuller	none	none	D.C. Cir.	affirmed
Metcalf Bros. Co. v. Barker	165 (1902)	Fuller	none	none	2d Cir.	certification
Pickens v. Roy	177 (1902)	Fuller	none	none	4th Cir.	affirmed
Grin v. Shine	181 (1902)	Brown	none	none	C.C.N.D. Cal.	affirmed
Knights et al. Co. v. Jarman	197 (1902)	Brown	none	none	8th Cir.	affirmed
Security T. Co. v. Black River Nat'l Bank	211 (1902)	Shiras	none	none	8th Cir.	reversed
Security T. Co. v. Dent	237 (1902)	Shiras	none	none	8th Cir.	reversed
Macfarland v. Brown	239 (1902)	Shiras	none	none	D.C. Cir.	dismissed
Macfarland v. Byrnes	246 (1902)	Shiras	none	none	D.C. Cir.	dismissed
Mencke v. Cargo of J.S.	248 (1902)	Shiras	none	none	2d Cir.	reversed
North C. Ry. Co. v. Maryland	258 (1902)	White	none	none	Md.	affirmed
Evans v. Nellis	271 (1902)	White	none	none	2d Cir.	certification
Lawder v. Stone	281 (1902)	White	none	none	4th Cir.	reversed
Cherokee Nation v. Hitchcock	294 (1902)	White	none	none	D.C. Cir.	affirmed
Equitable L.A. Soc'y v. Brown	308 (1902)	White	none	none	Sup. Ct. Terr. Haw.	dismissed
Fidelity D. Co. v. United States ex rel. Smoot	315 (1902)	McKenna	none	none	D.C. Cir.	affirmed
United States v. Moseley	322 (1902)	McKenna	none	none	Ct. Cl.	affirmed
Elliott Co. v. Toeppner	327 (1902)	Fuller	none	none	6th Cir.	certification
Iowa L. Ins. Co. v. Lewis	335 (1902)	McKenna	none	none	C.C.N.D. Tex.	reversed
Layton v. Missouri	356 (1902)	Fuller	none	none	Mo.	dismissed
Burt v. Union C.L. Ins. Co.	362 (1902)	Brewer	none	none	5th Cir.	affirmed
Pam-to-Pee v. United States	371 (1902)	Brewer	none	White	Ct. Cl.	affirmed
Young Women's C.H. v. French	401 (1903)	Fuller	none	none	D.C. Cir.	reversed
Western Union T. Co. v. Borough of New Hope	419 (1903)	Fuller	none	none	Pa. Super. Ct.	affirmed
Cary Mfg. Co. v. Acme F.C. Co.	427 (1903)	Fuller	none	none	2d Cir.	dismissed
Mexican C. Ry. Co. v. Eckman	429 (1903)	Fuller	none	none	C.C.W.D. Tex.	affirmed
United States v. Sampson	436 (1903)	Fuller	none	none	D.C. Cir.	substitution permitted
Oshkosh W. Co. v. City of Oshkosh	437 (1903)	Harlan	none	none	Wis.	affirmed
Pacific S.W. Co. v. United States	447 (1903)	Brewer	none	none	D. Alaska	affirmed
Pacific C.S.S. Co. v. United States	454 (1903)	Brewer	none	none	D. Alaska	affirmed
Corbus v. Alaska T.G.M. Co.	455 (1903)	Brewer	none	none	D. Alaska	affirmed
Stewart v. Washington et al. Co.	466 (1902)	Brewer	none	none	D. Alaska	affirmed
Hartford F. Ins. Co. v. Wilson	467 (1903)	Brewer	none	none	D.C. Cir.	reversed
Mobile T. Co. v. City of Mobile	479 (1903)	Brown	none	none	Ala.	affirmed
Johnson v. New York L. Ins. Co.	491 (1903)	Brown	none	none	Iowa	dismissed
Downs v. United States	496 (1903)	Brown	none	none	4th Cir.	affirmed
Clinton W. Co. v. California F.S. Co.	516 (1903)	Shiras	none	none	9th Cir.	reversed
A mark that itself is intended to deceive the public deprives its owner of equitable relief. In this case, the product called "Syrup of Figs" was more accurately "Syrup of Senna," so plaintiff had no right to enjoin defendant from calling its product "Fig Syrup".
Chadwick v. Kelly	540 (1903)	Shiras	none	none	La.	affirmed
Manley v. Park	547 (1903)	White	none	none	Kan.	affirmed
Lone Wolf v. Hitchcock	553 (1903)	White	none	none	D.C. Cir.	affirmed
Telluride P.T. Co. v. Rio Grande W. Ry. Co.	569 (1903)	McKenna	none	none	Utah	dismissed
Ayres v. Polsdorfer	585 (1903)	McKenna	none	none	6th Cir.	dismissed
Page v. Edmunds	596 (1903)	McKenna	none	none	3d Cir.	affirmed
Otis v. Parker	606 (1903)	Holmes	none	none	Cal.	affirmed
Diamond G. Co. v. United States G. Co.	611 (1903)	Holmes	none	none	C.C.E.D. Wis.	affirmed
Hanley v. Kansas City S. Ry. Co.	617 (1903)	Holmes	none	none	C.C.E.D. Ark.	affirmed
Caldwell v. North Carolina	622 (1903)	Shiras	none	none	N.C.	reversed

== See also ==
- Certificate of division
