= Lone Wolf the Younger =

Kiowa warrior

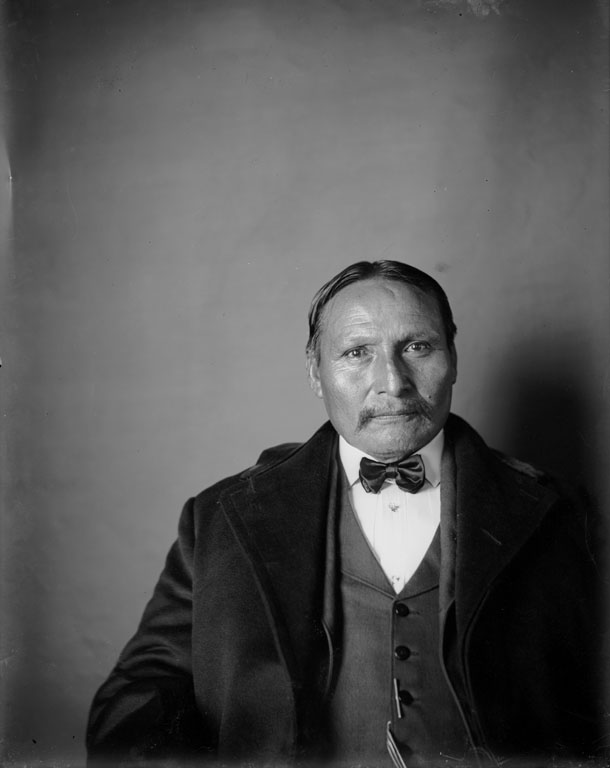
Lone Wolf the Younger, Kiowa

Lone Wolf the Younger (Kiowa: G̶ûib̶à:gàui), also known as Guipago the Younger, or the Elk Creek Lone Wolf (c. 1843 - 1923) was a Kiowa and warrior originally named Mamay-day-te. After a raid he was given the name Guipago (Kiowa: G̶ûib̶à:gàui) by Guipago the Elder after avenging the death of Tau-ankia, the only son of Guipago the Elder. Mamay-day-te participated in a raid avenging deaths and counted his first coup during the attack. Lone Wolf the Younger led the Kiowa resistance to United States governmental influence on the reservation, which culminated in the Supreme Court case Lone Wolf v. Hitchcock.

Lone Wolf was the son of Áulkóñétd̶e (Big Black Hair) and Paugei-to (Pursuing Them Along A River). He was a full brother to B̶ílkóñ:gyái (Saudlekongeah or Black Turtle), Tsâlkóñ:gyái (Black Goose, Bolekonegeah, Chaddlekaungy-ky), Hóp:éhólàñ: (Hovekah or Jack Wolf), and T’è:nég̶út (Spottedbird). They comprised a large and influential Kiowa family from the western part of the KCA Reservation.

Lone Wolf the Younger lived along with his Kiowa followers in the northern part of the reservation near Mount Scott and the Elk and Rainy Mountain creeks. The Indian Agents for the reservation called Lone Wolf and his followers "The Implacables" due to their strong opposition to governmental policies. They opposed the government at every turn and fought to keep their children out of government run schools and they resisted being turned into farmers and Christians. Lone Wolf and his group particularly opposed the General Allotment Act or the Dawes Act which was enacted in 1887.

== Jerome Commission ==
The Jerome Commission was one of fifteen commissions working throughout Indian Country to allot Indian lands and to open up the last part of the United States to white settlers. The Jerome Commission came to the Kiowa, Comanche, Plains Apache's (commonly referred to as the KCA) Reservation in 1892 to gain Indian approval to change the Medicine Lodge Treaty assurances and Indian consent to the opening of the reserve to white settlers. The Indians of the KCA reserve unanimously opposed allotment as well as any further railroad rights of way through their lands; they wanted their lands to be left as they were. The commission worked to convince the KCA tribes that they only needed 500,000 acres of land to sustain their needs and the other 2.6 million acres should be opened up for sale. David Jerome assured them that living on the new allotments would not be any different than their current life on the reservation. Lone Wolf attended the first two days of meetings to hear what the commissioners had to say and responded for the Kiowas on September 28. Lone Wolf explained that the tribes were working to change the way they had lived their lives and had made progress. Lone Wolf emphasized that if forced to take allotments it would be detrimental to the Kiowa, Comanche, and Apache tribes and that the tribes had decided they did not want to allot the lands currently in their possession on the reservation. They did not want to divert from the Medicine Lodge Treaty's terms and accept allotment. After much debating on both sides the Jerome Commissioners left for Washington, D.C. confident they had obtained the necessary signatures of three-fourths of the adult male Kiowa, Comanche, and Apache residents of the reservation as agreed upon in the 1867 Medicine Lodge Treaty. Lone Wolf and the members of the KCA tribes believed the signatures needed had not been met and that many of the signatures obtained were falsified.

== Lone Wolf v. Hitchcock ==
=== Preceding the court case ===
With the assistance of the Indian Rights Association, Lone Wolf and the Kiowa people lobbied against the ratification of the Jerome Agreement by Congress. The basis for the Indian Rights Associations support was that they felt the Agreement was wrongly imposed upon the Indians, it had false signatures, and in effect the lands were being taken without compensation and the size of the allotments offered to the Indians was not adequate to support them. Despite the various protests, in 1900 Congress added the substantially amended Jerome document as Section 6 to the Fort Hall Agreement of June 6 and passed the legislation allotting the Kiowa, Comanche, and Apache reserve and opened the reservation's surplus lands to white settlers. Under the terms of the Act of June 6, 1900, the United States took over title to over 2.9 million acres of the KCA Reservation.

=== Lower courts ===
Lone Wolf and his nephew Delos Knowles Lone Wolf, educated at Carlisle Boarding School who was a farmer and government interpreter on the KCA Reservation, hired attorney William McKendree Springer to handle the litigation. On July 22, 1901 Lone Wolf pursued a temporary restraining order and a permanent injunction stopping the cession and the opening of the surplus lands of the Kiowa, Comanche, Apache Reservation. Springer was accompanied by Hays McMeehan, William C. Reeves, and Charles Porter Johnson. Lone Wolf was joined by Eschiti, White Buffalo, Ko-koy-taudle, Mar-mo-car-wer, Nar-wats, Too-wi-car-ne, William Tivis, and Delos K. Lone Wolf as plaintiffs. On August 17, 1901 Canadian Judge Clinton F. Irwin refused to issue the temporary restraining order requested by Lone Wolf and the other plaintiffs.

=== Supreme Court for the District of Columbia ===
Lone Wolf appealed to the Supreme Court for the District of Columbia and argued that the Jerome Agreement deprived them of their lands without due process of law. Springer for Lone Wolf and the aforementioned plaintiffs argued four points in regards to the Jerome Agreement 1.) The Kiowa, Comanche, and Apache Indians were fraudulently induced to sign the Jerome Agreement and those that did sign did not fully understand its provisions vastly due to the fact that, like Lone Wolf, most of the Indians did not speak English and relied on interpreters. 2.) The Jerome Agreement was not signed by three-fourths of the adult male members of the tribes as required by the Medicine Lodge Treaty. Lone Wolf alleged that the total number of Indian males exceeded the number claimed by the Indian Agent and that the census of 1900 showed there were 639 adult male members of the KCA tribes on the reservation. Thus the Jerome Agreement was twenty-three signatures short of the required amount. 3.) The KCA's had protested the agreement from the beginning. 4.) The version that was ratified by Congress had been significantly altered and amended and the changes made had not been submitted to the KCA for their approval. Springer argued for Lone Wolf that Congress should not be able to unilaterally alter the provisions of the agreement without the Indians' consent and thus the Act should be rejected. Hitchcock responded by arguing that Lone Wolf and the others had taken allotments for themselves and the KCA had been compensated for the ceded lands and by taking the allotments and accepting money for the lands they had accepted the Jerome Agreement. On June 21, 1901 Justice A. C. Bradley denied the KCA's application for a temporary injunction. Justice Bradley stated that Indian tribes are not independent nations but they are dependent wards of the United States in a state of pupilage, subject to the control of Congress.

=== Appeals of the District of Columbia ===
Springer appealed the District of Columbia Supreme Court's dismissal of the bill to the Court of Appeals of the District of Columbia. While the Lone Wolf's appeal was pending in the Court of Appeals, President McKinley issued a proclamation ordering the surplus lands of the KCA Indian reservation be opened on August 6, 1901 for white settlement through a lottery. On December 4, 1901, Chief Justice Alvey of the D.C. Court of Appeals affirmed the decision of the lower court. Justice Alvey stated, in regards to the conflict between the 1867 Medicine Lodge Treaty and an act of Congress, that the Treaty has to yield to the act of Congress.

=== Supreme Court ===
William Springer was now aided by attorney Hampton Carson, whom was paid by the Indian Rights Association to assist Springer with the case in the Supreme Court. Springer and Hampton argued several points in the case. Up until this point, the United States had not taken Indian property without consent, the United States had always treated the right of occupancy the Indians possessed as sacred, the Canons of Construction must be followed in Indian law and the Court cannot interpret treaties in a way that prejudices the Indians, and due to treaties being the laws of the land and since the Medicine Lodge Treaty had created vested property rights in the KCA reservation lands, those lands were protected by the Constitution. Assistant Attorney General Willis Van Devanter argued on behalf of the United States and characterized the tribes as wards of the State. Justice Edward Douglass White, who wrote for the court on January 5, 1903, agreed. Due to the fact that Indians were seen as dependent nations and wards of the United States Congress had the right to abrogate a treaty with Indians if the provisions of the treaty went against the best interests of the United States. Justice White also relied on the last-in-time rule where a congressional statute that is the latest enactment may supersede a prior treaty and was the reason the 1867 Medicine Lodge Treaty could be abrogated. Justice White noted that the Court held that the appeal could not be decided in the courts of the United States but had to be made to Congress.

== Allotment of the reservation ==
By July 24, 1901 there were over 150,000 people who had registered for the lottery of the 11,638 homestead allotments. By 1906, 480,000 acres of land on the reservation that had been set aside for the common use of the KCA for grazing was opened up for white settlement. The preallotment total of 2.9 million acres was reduced to approximately 3000 acres by the end of the allotment era.

== After the case ==
Following the loss in court, Lone Wolf returned to the KCA reservation where he was still looked to for leadership by his fellow tribe members and he lived with his family on his allotment until his death in 1923.

== Settlement ==
In the 1920s, after the loss of Lone Wolf's case in the Supreme Court, the Kiowa Indians went to Congress seeking legislation to help them. In 1955, the Indian Claims Commission awarded the Kiowa, Comanche and Apache tribes over 2 million dollars in additional compensation for the land allotted in the Act of 1900.
