= Little Arkansas Treaty =

1865 treaties between the United States and Native Americans

The Little Arkansas Treaty was a set of treaties signed between the United States of America and the Kiowa, Comanche, Plains Apache, Southern Cheyenne, and Southern Arapaho at Little Arkansas River, Kansas in October 1865. On October 14 and 18, 1865 the United States and all of the major Plains Indians Tribes signed a treaty on the Little Arkansas River, which became known as the Little Arkansas Treaty. It is notable in that it lasted less than two years, the reservations it created for the Plains Indians were never created at all, and were reduced by 90% eighteen months later in the Medicine Lodge Treaty.

The full treaty can be found online.

== The Civil War ==
The Civil War was ending, and the Union did not want to have to keep hundreds of thousands of men under arms to defend immigrants against Indian attacks. Therefore the government sent highly respected Commissioners to the Plains Tribes, and asked them to meet and talk peace.

== Chiefs and Commissioners in attendance ==
Among the Native American Leaders in attendance were Chiefs Black Kettle and Seven Bulls (Cheyenne), Little Raven and Big Mouth (Comanche), Poor Bear, Old Fool Man, and Crow (Apache), Little Raven, and Storm, (Arapaho), Satanta and Satank (Kiowa). Federal commissioners with great prestige and standing among the Indians were General Harney, Colonel Leavenworth, Kit Carson and William Bent.

For the United States, the signatories of the treaty were:

- John B. Sanborn
- William S. Harney
- James Steele
- William. W. Bent
- Kit Carson
- Thomas Murphy
- Col. J. H. Leavenworth, black bear

Commissioners on the part of the United States.

For the Native Americans, the signatories of the treaty were:

- Kou-zhon-ta-co, or Poor Bear, head chief, his x mark.
- Ba-zhe-ech, or Iron Shirt, his x mark.
- Az-che-om-a-te-ne, or the Old Fool Man, chief, his x mark.
- Karn-tin-ta, or the Crow, chief, his x mark.
- Mah-vip-pah, or The Wolf Sleeve, chief, his x mark.
- Nahn-tan, or The Chief, his x mark.

On the part of the Kiowa-Apaches (Or Plains-Apaches)

- Moke-ta-ve-to, or Black Kettle, head chief, his x mark.
- Oh-to-ah-ne-so-to-wheo, or Seven Bulls, chief, his x mark.
- Hark-kah-o-me, or Little Robe, chief, his x mark.
- Moke-tah-vo-ve-ho, or Black White Man, chief, his x mark.
- Mun-a-men-ek, or Eagle's Head, headman, his x mark.
- O-to-ah-nis-to, or Bull that Hears, headman, his x mark.

On the part of the Cheyennes

- Oh-has-tee, or Little Raven, lead chief, his x mark.
- Oh-hah-mah-hah, or Storm, chief, his x mark.
- Pah-uf-pah-top, or Big Mouth, chief, his x mark.
- Ah-cra-ka-tau-nah, or Spotted Wolf, chief, his x mark.
- Ah-nah-wat-tan, or Black Man, headman, his x mark.
- Nah-a-nah-cha, Chief in Everything, headman, his x mark.
- Chi-e-nuk, or Haversack, headman, his x mark.

On the part of the Arapahoes

- Tab-e-nan-i-kah, or Rising Sun, chief of Yampirica, or Root Eater band of Camanches, for Paddy-*Wah-say-mer and Ho-to-yo-koh-wat's bands, his x mark.
- Esh-e-tave-pa-rah, or Female Infant, headman of Yampirica band of Camanches, his x mark.
- A-sha-hab-beet, or Milky Way, chief Penne-taha, or Sugar Eater band of Camanches, and for Co-che-te-ka, or Buffalo Eater band, his x mark.
- Queen-ah-e-vah, or Eagle Drinking, head chief of No-co-nee or Go-about band of Camanches, his x mark.
- Ta-ha-yer-quoip, or Horse's Back, second chief of No-co-nee or Go-about band of Camanches, his x mark.
- Pocha-naw-quoip, or Buffalo Hump, third chief of Pennetaka, or Sugar Eater band of Camanches, his x mark.
- Ho-to-yo-koh-wot, or Over the Buttes, chief of Yampirica band, his x mark.
- Parry-wah-say-mer, or Ten Bears, chief of Yampirica band, his x mark.
- Bo-yah-wah-to-yeh-be, or Iron Mountain, chief of Yampirica band of Camanches, his x mark.
- Bo-wah-quas-suh, or Iron Shirt, chief of De-na-vi band, or Liver Eater band of Camanches, his x mark.
- To-sa-wi, or Silver Brooch, head chief of Pennetaka band of Camanches, his x mark.

On the part of the Comanches

- Queil-park [recte: Gui-pah-gho], or Lone Wolf, his x mark.
- Wah-toh-konk, or Black Eagle, his x mark.
- Zip-ki-yah, or Big Bow, his x mark.
- Sa-tan-ta, or White Bear, his x mark.
- Ton-a-en-ko, or Kicking Eagle, his x mark.
- Settem-ka-yah, or Bear Runs over a Man, (also reported as *Sa-tim-gear, or Stumbling Bear) his x mark.
- Kaw-pe-ah, or Plumed Lance, his x mark.
- To-hau-son, or Little Mountain, his x mark.
- Sa-tank, or Sitting Bear, his x mark.
- Pawnee, or Poor Man, his x mark.
- Ta-ki-bull, or Stinking Saddle Cloth, his x mark.
- Sit-par-ga, or One Bear, chief, his x mark.

On the part of the Kiowa

== What both sides wanted ==
The white representatives wanted peace, unmolested traffic on the Santa Fe trail and limitation of Indian territory. The Indians demanded unrestricted hunting grounds and reparation for the Chivington massacre of Black Kettle's band. Treaties made here gave the Indians reservations south of the Arkansas, excluded them north to the Platte and proclaimed peace. Several white captives were released, among them a woman and four children from Texas, the Box family, taken by a war party under Satanta.

== The aftermath ==
This is one of the shortest treaties in history. None of its major provisions were ever implemented. Both sides charged violations and warfare continued until the Medicine Lodge treaties of 1867. There is a monument one mile west of the Little Arkansas River, on the Council Grounds, in Kansas, commemorating the Treaty.
