= Chief Niwot =

Arapho leader

Niwot
- Nowoo3
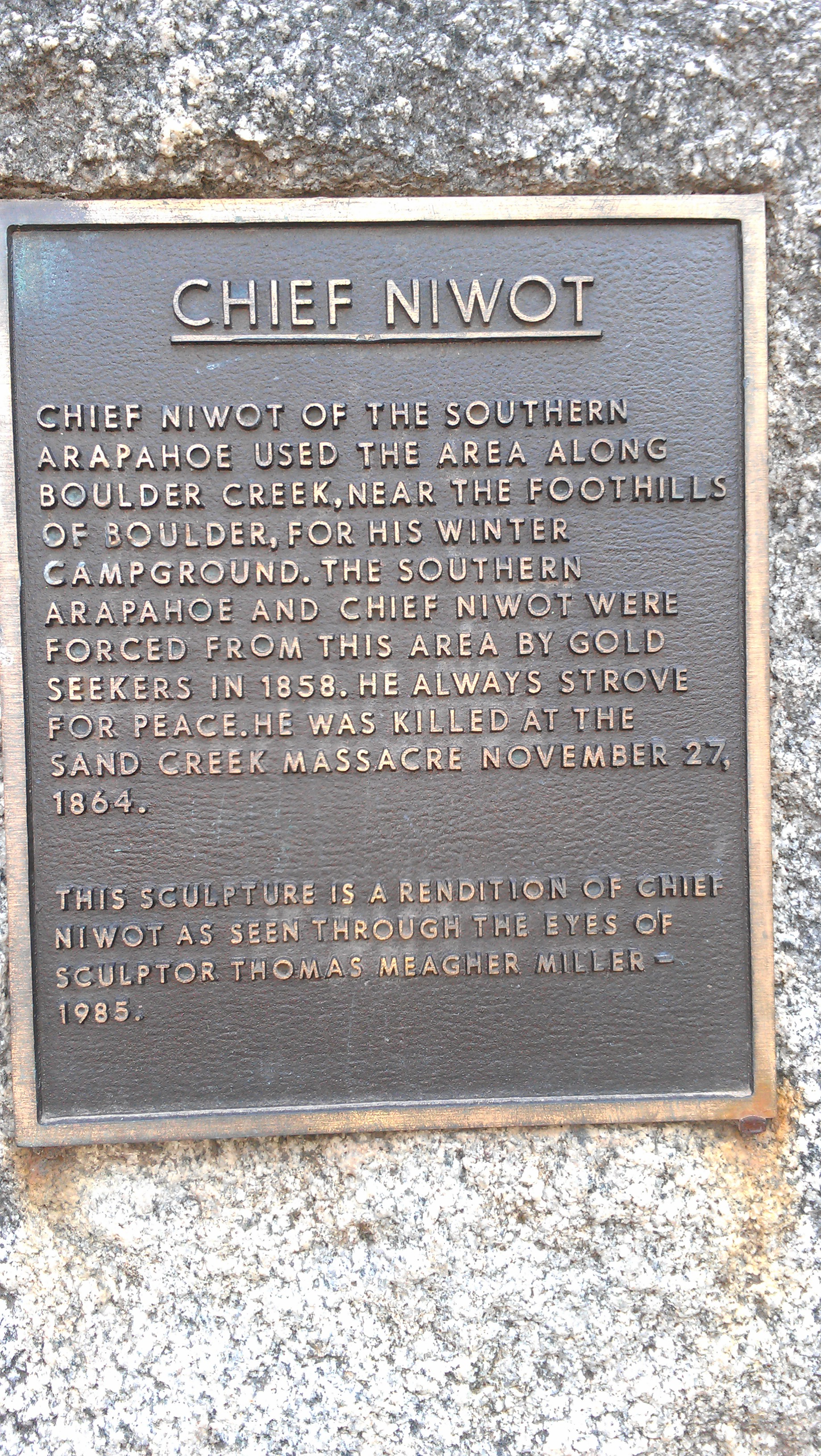
- Born: c. 1825; Western Great Plains
- Died: November 29, 1864; Sand Creek, Colorado
- Cause of death: Killed in the Sand Creek Massacre
- Other name: Left Hand
- Citizenship: Southern Arapaho
- Relatives: Neva (brother) Mahom (sister)

Chief Niwot (Arapaho: Nowoo3 [nɔˈwɔːθ]) or Left Hand(-ed) (c. 1825–1864) was a Southern Arapaho chief, diplomat, and interpreter who negotiated for peace between white settlers and the Cheyenne and Arapaho tribes during the Pike's Peak Gold Rush (1858-1861) and the Colorado War (1864–1865).

Niwot lived along the Front Range, and wintered near the site of modern-day Boulder, Colorado. A fluent English speaker, Niwot was often relied on as a translator and interpreter in negotiations between tribal leaders and settlers. Niwot was a prominent advocate of peace during the negotiations, and sought to de-escalate growing tension between native groups and settlers.

Niwot was among the chiefs who complied with Colorado Governor John Evans and US Colonel John Chivington to relocate to Fort Lyon, where they were to await a peace agreement. The Arapaho and Cheyenne who went to Fort Lyon were again relocated to Sand Creek. Niwot is generally believed to have died in the subsequent Sand Creek Massacre in 1864.

Many place names in Boulder County pay tribute to Chief Niwot, including Niwot, Colorado, Left Hand Creek, Left Hand Canyon, Niwot Mountain, Niwot High School, Niwot Elementary, Niwot Ridge and the Left Hand Brewing Company. A quote from Chief Niwot is also circulated in Boulder County, and is known as Chief Niwot's Curse.

== Early life ==
Niwot's exact date of birth and location of birth are unknown. At the start of the Colorado Gold Rush, he was around 40 years old which places his birth sometime in the 1820s. The Arapaho were nomadic and ranged across the western Great Plains, and Niwot may have been born anywhere in modern-day Kansas, Nebraska, Wyoming, Oklahoma, or Colorado.

Niwot had two siblings, Neva and Mahom. His birth name, per Arapaho naming custom, likely meant that he was genuinely left-handed.

During Niwot's childhood white settlers were already establishing forts in Arapaho land, like Fort Saint Vrain and Bent's Fort in Colorado. Niwot's sister, Mahom, married a settler from Bent's Fort in 1833. The settler, now Niwot's brother-in-law, John Poisal, taught Niwot to speak English. Niwot and Poisal appear to have maintained a friendly relationship, as in 1846 a settler's account mentions Niwot scouting across the Arkansas River on Poisal's behalf.

== Increased American expansion ==
In the 1830s and 1840s, white presence in Arapaho territory grew quickly, owing to factors including the California Gold Rush, Mexican-American War, and the Mormon settlement of Utah. The passage of more white settlers through the Great Plains coincided with epidemics of cholera among the Arapaho that greatly reduced their population.

Some Southern Arapaho, in concert with members of the Comanche, raided these wagon trains in 1846 and 1847. Niwot, though able to participate in the raids, chose not to and advocated for the cessation of the raiding. However, tension continued to rise between white settlers and native groups. Both groups made efforts to negotiate peace, which resulted in the signing of the Treaty of Fort Laramie in 1868. Niwot, though not yet a prominent member of the Arapaho, would likely have attended the signing.

In the 1850s, it was increasingly evident that white activity in Arapaho territory would continue in spite of the Treaty of Fort Laramie. As Niwot was one of the few Arapaho who could speak English fluently, Hosa, the principal chief of the Southern Arapaho, relied on him as a translator. This duty likely earned Niwot the status of chief himself.

In 1858, Chief Niwot, along with his wife and children, travelled east to the United States, ostensibly to learn about agriculture, which the Arapaho were curious about employing. On their return, Niwot set up camp in present-day Boulder County.

== Relations with gold-seekers ==
In 1858, following Niwot's return from the United States, a group of gold-seekers led by Captain Thomas Aikens set up an outpost near Boulder Creek, very close to the Arapaho's winter camp. Niwot and other prominent members left their encampment near Valmont Butte to meet the prospectors. Accounts of the encounter between Aikens and the Arapaho Chiefs differ. Members of Aikens party allege that Niwot permitted them to stay in the area, while other accounts argue that Niwot asked Aikens to leave immediately, as he could not guarantee the prospectors' safety. It is generally accepted that some Arapaho leaders, concerned by the proximity of white settlers to their winter grounds, were hostile to Aikens, while Niwot urged peace between the two groups.

The 1850s saw the establishment of townships along the Front Range, as gold-seekers moved toward the creation of permanent settlements in Arapaho territory. One of these settlements, the mining town of Denver, was close to the main settlement of Chief Hosa and the majority of the Southern Arapaho tribe. Despite the increasing proximity of white settlements to Arapaho lands, Niwot and Hosa maintained their stance of peaceful coexistence with the whites. Following the successful gold mining at Cherry Creek settlement and the discovery of gold in Boulder Canyon, Thomas Aikens decided to establish the permanent Boulder City Town Company in February 1859, reneging in his promise to Niwot that his party would only stay in Boulder Valley temporarily. These events prompted Niwot to relocate his band 15 miles to the north, farther from the growing white settlements.

== Growing tensions ==
In 1859, Niwot and Hosa met with Horace Greeley in Denver to conduct a series of interviews, with Niwot acting as Hosa's translator. Greeley characterized Niwot as "shrewd" and noted Niwot's resistance to the idea of adapting to a sedentary agricultural lifestyle.

In 1860, while Niwot was away from his village, a group of whites from Auraria, Colorado raped several Arapaho women. The whites, led by Charles Gardner, were quickly condemned and subjected to a public meeting in Auraria, and on his return Niwot agreed to allow Auraria to handle their punishment, rather than retaliate for the attack. Gardner and other whites were not charged with any crime.

Tension between the white settlers and Native American groups was growing rapidly in the early 1860s. Niwot's Arapahos focused raids in this time on rival tribes, notably the Utes. However, some Arapahos under Niwot occasionally stole from white settlers as well, in defiance of his orders. This forced Niwot to relinquish some control, but by July 1860, the raiding had ceased and Niwot appeared to be in charge again.

In 1861, Niwot and a few other Arapaho attempted to vote in an election being held in Denver. The whites in attendance claimed that the Arapaho did not deserve a vote, as they did not pay any property tax.

Niwot was one of the few Arapaho and Cheyenne leaders who did not sign the Treaty of Fort Wise. He argued that the signing had been specifically scheduled for a time when he could not be in attendance, as he was the only tribal leader who could speak Arapaho, Cheyenne, and English. It was Niwot's belief that the chiefs who signed the treaty had been tricked into agreeing to terms they did not understand. In the wake of the treaty, Cheyenne and Arapaho leaders came to agree with Niwot's stance; long-standing tension between the tribes and white settlers quickly evolved into war.

== Disease, famine and drought ==
Only weeks after the Treaty of Fort Wise was signed, Cheyenne raiding parties began to attack and burn isolated ranches. Stationed at Fort Wise, a company of American troops under Major John Sedgwick were prepared to retaliate. At his camp near Denver, Niwot continued to take a peaceful approach and stayed out of the fighting. His efforts to negotiate peace were focused on a relationship with William Byers, the editor of the Rocky Mountain News. Niwot wanted Byers to inform his readers in Denver that the Southern Arapaho maintained a friendly stance toward the white settlers.

Niwot and Hosa also lodged complaints against the outcome of the Fort Wise Treaty, stating that food was scarce for the Arapaho and that the promises made during the treaty had not yet been fulfilled.

In April 1861, Chief Niwot and fifteen Arapaho entered the Apollo Theater in Denver and took the stage once the evening's show was over. Niwot spoke directly to the audience, reminding them that the Arapaho were friendly and urging them to stop fighting with the other plains tribes.

On June 12, 1861, the Rocky Mountain News ran a story that Niwot had, with other Arapaho, broken into a home and robbed a rancher of clothing, food, and his rifle. The following week, Niwot met with William Byers to request a retraction. Niwot stated that the rancher had beat an Arapaho child unconscious with a club, prompting Niwot to enter the home and ask for repayment. The rancher's wife offered the goods to the Arapaho, who accepted it and departed. Byers printed Niwot's version of the story as well.

By 1863, conditions for Niwot and the Southern Arapaho had worsened. Famine and outbreaks of whooping cough and diarrhea were widespread. Niwot and the other Arapaho chiefs were increasingly unable to keep small bands of Arapaho warriors from attacking white settlers, and following an 1862 Sioux uprising in the northern plains, frontier settlements like Boulder and Denver looked to newly appointed territorial officials to mitigate the risk of violence.

Early in 1863, Indian Agent Samuel Colley decided to address both the settlers concerns of violence and the tribes' anger over the unfulfilled Treaty of Fort Wise by leading a delegation of Arapaho chiefs to Washington, DC to meet with President Lincoln. Colley, who had been involved with the handling of the treaty, departed Fort Wise early and without Niwot, once again hoping to prevent Niwot from serving as a translator. However, Niwot's brother Neva was in the delegation. Neva could also speak English, and relayed that John Smith, the principal translator at both the treaty signing and in Washington, characterized Niwot as an unimportant, minor chief.

In Colorado, groups of Sioux, Southern Arapaho, Northern Arapaho, and Cheyenne convened to discuss the prospect of war. Alarmed by this meeting, Governor John Evans met with Niwot and several other Arapaho. Niwot noted that the Arapaho had not to agreed to war, but Evans concluded that the tribes, with the exception of a few bands of Southern Arapaho, were planning to attack white settlements.

As Evans took steps to enforce the terms of the Fort Wise Treaty, Niwot and the Arapahos were continually plagued by famine, disease, and drought. In September 1864 Niwot, Hosa, and many Southern Arapaho arrived at Fort Wise (now renamed to Fort Lyon) and asked to be transferred to the reservations lands promised by the original treaty.

== The Colorado War ==
In May 1864, Governor John Evans received word that an army of Sioux, Cheyenne, Kiowa, and Comanche warriors was assembling near the Republican River. He noted that a single band of Arapaho - Chief Niwot's band - declined to join the war party.

On June 11, 1864, four Northern Arapaho attacked a ranch thirty miles south of Denver, where they killed and scalped all four members of the Hungate family. Evans and other Denver residents interpreted the attack as a declaration of war.

Niwot stayed in the area around the Arkansas River in Kansas during this time, getting food and other supplies for his people from nearby Fort Larned. He refused requests by neighboring Kiowa to join in attacks against the fort, and tried to warn officials of Fort Larned of the threat. Captain J.W. Parmeter routinely ignored these warnings.

After a Kiowa raiding party stole horses from Ford Larned, Niwot's Arapahos recovered the horses and attempted to return them to the fort. Parmeter fired on the Arapaho instead of receiving the horses. Niwot reported that he was not overly angered by the aggression, but that he was not able to restrain his warriors' anger after the attack. The Southern Arapaho began to raid the Santa Fe trail at that time, though Niwot neither advocated for the attacks, nor participated in them personally.

In August 1864, Governor Evans issued a proclamation allowing for Colorado citizens to kill any Native American suspected of being hostile. Those who gathered at predetermined meeting points were to be treated as peaceful. Many Arapaho chiefs, Niwot included, were not made aware of the proclamation and did not head for the forts Evans had specified. Evans made note in a report later that month that he did not know the whereabouts of Chief Niwot or Chief Hosa.

As August ended, Chief Niwot journeyed to meet with Black Kettle, a Cheyenne chief who also strongly opposed the war. Black Kettle and Niwot called a council, hoping to convince the disparate groups of their respective tribes to sue for peace. Niwot and Black Kettle were successful in convincing the other chiefs of a peaceful resolution, but now needed to convince white officials of the same. Peace emissaries from Black Kettle to the soldiers stationed at Fort Lyon had previously been fired upon. With the help of William Bent and Edmond Guerrier, the chiefs drafted a letter to Major Edward Wynkoop, then in command of Fort Lyon, informing the major of their peaceful intent. Another copy of the letter was sent to Indian Agent Samuel Colley. Wynkoop, in spite of protestations from his officers, agreed to leave Fort Lyon to personally meet with the chiefs.

Niwot, Black Kettle, and the other chiefs met Wynkoop at his camp on September 10, 1864. Niwot was once again the only man in the delegation to speak Cheyenne, Arapaho, and English. Niwot maintained to Wynkoop that his intentions had always been peaceful, and that Southern Arapaho raids against white settlers had happened without his consent.

Though negotiations were successful and both Colley and Wynkoop relayed the peaceful intent of the plains tribes to Governor Evans, these overtures were largely dismissed. Evans ordered Colonel John Chivington to begin raiding the tribes in search of hostiles. Concerned for the safety of their people, a consortium of Arapaho led by Niwot, Hosa, Neva, Storm, and No-Ta-Nee departed the camps and came to Fort Lyon. Niwot complied with Major Scott Anthony, now in charge of the Fort, and had the Southern Arapaho relinquish their weapons. As always, Niwot informed Anthony that the Southern Arapaho had no intention to go to war with white settlers.

In November 1864, Anthony informed Niwot and Hosa that Fort Lyon would no longer supply the Southern Arapaho living in the fort. Already in poor health, Niwot and the other Arapaho departed the fort to join Black Kettle and the Cheyenne already encamped at Sand Creek.

== The Sand Creek Massacre ==
After months of patrolling, John Chivington and the Third Colorado failed to find any hostile Native tribes on the prairie. In frustration, they headed for Sand Creek. Despite the testimony by Major Edward Wynkoop, commander of Fort Lyon, that the Native people at Sand Creek had not been raiding, Colonel Chivington and his men attacked at dawn on November 29, 1864, completely surprising the sleeping Native families.

Chief Black Kettle was sure there was a mistake, and hastily raised both a U.S. flag and a white flag of surrender. As bullets, including the only artillery barrage ever put forth by one group on another in the history of the State of Colorado, rained down on the scattering Arapaho and Cheyenne, it is reported Chief Niwot stood in the middle of the battle, arms folded, refusing to fight the white men he still believed were his friends.

Chief Niwot was mortally wounded and died a few days later. Of the ten lodges of Arapaho camped at Sand Creek, about 50 or 60 Arapahoes, only four or five survived. No exact statistics exist on the total number of natives killed at the Sand Creek Massacre, but most historians place the number at approximately 180. Most of the dead were women, children and the elderly.

The Sand Creek Massacre was such an atrocity that President Abraham Lincoln, though in the midst of the Civil War, called for a Congressional investigation into the tragedy. Congress ruled the "gross and wanton" incident a "massacre" rather than a "battle." Chivington was censured for his actions. Governor Evans was removed from office and Colorado was placed under martial law.

Chief Niwot and his people's massacre at Sand Creek represents a major precipitating event that resulted in three following decades of "Indian Wars" in the West.

The fighting between whites and the Arapaho continued. The Treaty of Medicine Lodge, signed in 1867, put the Southern Arapaho on The Cheyenne and Arapaho Indian Reservation in Oklahoma, but resistance continued until 1869, when General Eugene Carr, assisted by William "Buffalo Bill" Cody, finally defeated the Cheyenne and Arapaho at the Battle of Summit Springs, ending their presence in Colorado. The Northern Arapaho continued to resist white settlement seven more years until 1876, fighting General George Armstrong Custer at the Little Bighorn before finally being driven into the Wind River Reservation in Wyoming.

== Uncertainty surrounding death ==
Over the years, reports filtered out of Oklahoma that Chief Niwot did not die at Sand Creek, but rather was alive on the reservation. Since he made it off the battlefield alive after the Sand Creek Massacre, official accounts never confirmed his death. Photos of an Arapaho named Niwot appeared in the late 19th century, which only fueled the rumors of Chief Niwot's survival. A 1907 Baptist Home Monthly (Vol. 29, p. 113) reports that "old Chief Left Hand" and 100 of his Arapahoes had converted that January to the Baptist faith, quoting him as reminiscing about his more warlike days.

Historians agree Niwot did not go with his people to Oklahoma. A younger warrior named Niwot did emerge as a leader of the Arapahos in Oklahoma, but it is now believed he was not related to the former Arapaho chief. There are no known photographs of Chief Niwot, although there is a bronze sculpture interpreting his likeness in front of the Boulder County Courthouse in downtown Boulder, Colorado.
