= Medicine Lodge Treaty =

1867 resettlement agreement between the US government and southern Plains Indian tribes

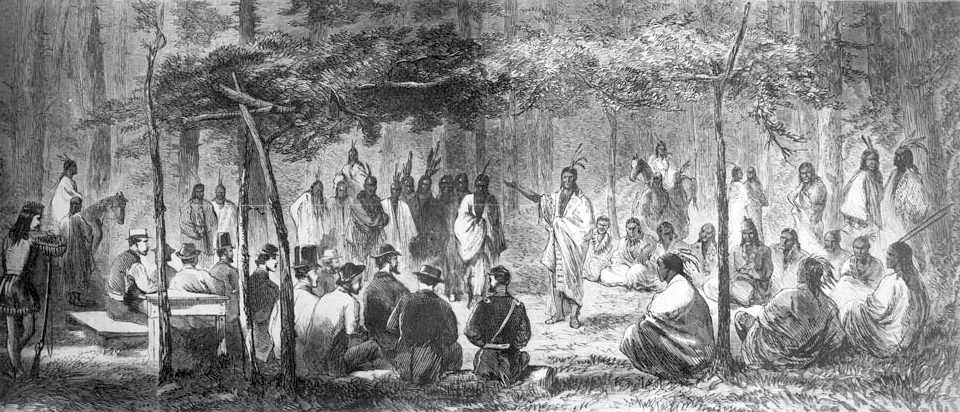
- Council at Medicine Lodge Creek, drawing from Harper's Weekly
- Signed: 21 October 1867; 28 October 1867
- Location: Medicine Lodge Peace Treaty Site
- Signatories: United States; Kiowa; Comanche; United States; Kiowa-Apache; United States; Southern Cheyenne; Arapaho
- Citations: 15 Stat. 581 15 Stat. 589 15 Stat. 593
- See also the Act of 6 June 1900, §6, 31 Stat. 672, 676.

The Medicine Lodge Treaty is the overall name for three treaties signed near Medicine Lodge, Kansas, between the Federal government of the United States and southern Plains Indian tribes in October 1867, intended to bring peace to the area by relocating the Native Americans to reservations in Indian Territory and away from European-American settlement. The treaty was negotiated after investigation by the Indian Peace Commission, which in its final report in 1868 concluded that the wars had been preventable. They determined that the United States government and its representatives, including the United States Congress, had contributed to the warfare on the Great Plains by failing to fulfill their legal obligations and to treat the Native Americans with honesty.

The U.S. government and tribal chiefs met at a place traditional for Native American ceremonies, at their request. The first treaty was signed October 21, 1867, with the Kiowa and Comanche tribes. The second, with the Kiowa-Apache, was signed the same day. The third treaty was signed with the Southern Cheyenne and Arapaho on October 28.

Under the Medicine Lodge Treaty, the tribes were assigned reservations of diminished size compared to territories defined in an 1865 treaty. The treaty tribes never ratified the treaty by vote of adult men, as it required. In addition, by changing allotment policy under the Dawes Act and authorizing sales under the Agreement with the Cheyenne and Arapaho (1890) and the Agreement with the Comanche, Kiowa and Apache (1892) signed with the Cherokee Commission, the Congress effectively further reduced their reservation territory. The Kiowa chief Lone Wolf filed suit against the government for fraud on behalf of the tribes in Lone Wolf v. Hitchcock. In 1903 the U.S. Supreme Court ruled against the tribes, determining that the Congress had "plenary power" and the political right to make such decisions. In the aftermath of that case, Congress acted unilaterally on land decisions related to other reservations as well.

Because of the outstanding issues with the treaty and subsequent government actions, in the mid-20th century, the Kiowa, Arapaho and Comanche filed several suits for claims against the U.S. government. Over decades, they won substantial settlements of monetary compensation in the amount of tens of millions of dollars, although it took years for the cases to be resolved.

== Indian Peace Commission ==
On July 20, 1867, Congress established the Indian Peace Commission to negotiate peace with Plains Indian tribes who were warring with the United States. The Peace Commission met in St. Louis, Missouri, on August 6, 1867, where it elected Nathaniel G. Taylor, Commissioner of Indian Affairs, as its president. Commissioners agreed that lasting peace was contingent upon separating Indians regarded as "hostile" from those regarded as friendly, removing all Indian tribes onto reservations away from the routes of U.S. westward expansion, and making provision for their maintenance.

The official report of the Commission to the President of the United States, dated January 7, 1868, describes detailed histories of the causes of the Indian Wars including: numerous social and legal injustices to Indians, repeated violations of numerous treaties, acts of corruption by many of the local agents, and culpability of Congress in failing to fulfill certain legal obligations. The report asserts that the Indian Wars were completely preventable had the United States government and its representatives acted with legal and moral honesty in dealing with the Indians.

Other members of the peace commission were Lieutenant General William T. Sherman, commander of the Military Division of the Missouri; Major General William S. Harney (retired), who had taken part in earlier conflicts with the Cheyenne and Sioux along the Platte River; Brigadier General Alfred H. Terry, commander of the Military Department of Dakota; Senator John B. Henderson of Missouri, Chairman of the Senate Indian Appropriations Committee, who had introduced the bill that created the peace commission; Colonel Samuel F. Tappan, formerly of the First Colorado Volunteer Cavalry and a peace advocate who had led the U.S. Army's investigation of the Sand Creek massacre; and Major General John B. Sanborn, formerly commander of the Upper Arkansas District, who had previously helped to negotiate the Little Arkansas Treaty of 1865.

Gen. Sherman, having made public remarks indicating his disagreement with the peace policy, was called to Washington, D.C., and could not be present at the councils on the southern plains, including the council at Medicine Lodge Creek. Major General Christopher C. Augur, commander of the Military Department of the Platte, replaced him as a temporary appointment.

== Medicine Lodge River councils ==
After an abortive meeting with northern Plains Indians in September, the commission gathered at Fort Leavenworth (Kansas) in early October and traveled from there by rail to Fort Harker. There it was joined by an escort of five hundred troops of the 7th U.S. Cavalry Regiment and Battery B of the 4th artillery, armed with two Gatling guns. They were under the command of Maj. Joel H. Elliott, who had been excused from attending the court martial proceedings for Lt. Col. George Armstrong Custer then underway at Fort Leavenworth. The commission was also accompanied by numerous newspaper reporters, who provided detailed coverage of the people and events related to the commission's work.

The commission arrived at Fort Larned (present-day Kansas) on October 11, where some chiefs were already present, including Black Kettle of the Cheyenne, Little Raven of the Arapaho, and Satanta of the Kiowa. At the insistence of the tribes, the meetings were moved from Larned to Medicine Lodge River (near present day Medicine Lodge, Kansas), a traditional Indian ceremonial site. Preliminary discussions beginning on October 15 concluded that the Hancock expedition led earlier in 1867 by Maj. Gen. Winfield Scott Hancock, during which a large Cheyenne and Sioux village at Pawnee Fork had been approached, and when found empty, destroyed - had been ill-conceived. This conclusion, and the commissioners' apology for the village's destruction, served to clear the air. It created a more positive atmosphere for the councils, which began in earnest on October 19.

== Treaty terms and signatories ==
The treaties negotiated at Medicine Lodge Creek were similar in their terms, involving surrender of traditional tribal territories in exchange for much smaller reservations in Indian Territory (present day Oklahoma) and allowances of food, clothing, equipment, and weapons and ammunition for hunting.

=== Treaties with the Kiowa, Comanche, and Plains Apache ===
Under the first of the three Medicine Lodge treaties, the Kiowa and Comanche were compelled to give up more than 60,000 square miles (16,000,000 ha) of traditional tribal territories in exchange for a 3-million-acre (1,200,000 ha) reservation in the southwest corner of Indian Territory (present-day Oklahoma), most of it lying between the North Fork of the Red River and the North Canadian River. The tribes would also be provided houses, barns, and schools worth $30,000, which the tribes had not requested. By a second treaty, the Plains or Kiowa-Apache were incorporated into the first treaty; this treaty was signed by all the Kiowa and Comanche signatories of the first treaty, along with several Plains Apache chiefs. The treaties with the Kiowa, Comanche, and Plains Apache tribes were concluded on October 21, 1867.

Kiowa chiefs signing

- Satank, or Sitting Bear
- Sa-tan-ta, or White Bear
- Wa-toh-konk, or Black Eagle
- Ton-a-en-ko, or Kicking Eagle (Kicking Bird)
- Fish-e-more, or Stinging Saddle
- Ma-ye-tin, or Woman's Heart
- Sa-tim-gear, or Stumbling Bear
- Sit-par-ga, [Sa-pa-ga] or One Bear
- Cor-beau, or The Crow
- Sa-ta-more, or Bear Lying Down

Comanche chiefs signing

- Parry-wah-say-men, or Ten Bears
- Tep-pe-navon, or Painted Lips
- To-sa-in (To-she-wi), or Silver Brooch
- Cear-chi-neka, or Standing Feather
- Ho-we-ar, or Gap in the Woods
- Tir-ha-yah-gua-hip, or Horse's Back
- Es-a-nanaca (Es-a-man-a-ca), or Wolf's Name
- Ah-te-es-ta, or Little Horn
- Pooh-yah-to-yeh-be, or Iron Mountain
- Sad-dy-yo, or Dog Fat

Plains Apache chiefs signing

- Mah-vip-pah, Wolf's Sleeve
- Kon-zhon-ta-co, Poor Bear
- Cho-se-ta, or Bad Back
- Nah-tan, or Brave Man
- Ba-zhe-ech, Iron Shirt
- Til-la-ka, or WhiteHorn

At that conference, the Comanche Chief Parry-wah-say-men (Ten Bears) gave an address that foretold the future of his people:

My heart is filled with joy when I see you here, as the brooks fill with water when the snow melts in the spring; and I feel glad, as the ponies do when the fresh grass starts in the beginning of the year. I heard of your coming when I was many sleeps away, and I made but a few camps when I met you. I know that you had come to do good to me and my people. I looked for benefits which would last forever, and so my face shines with joy as I look upon you. My people have never first drawn a bow or fired a gun against the whites. There has been trouble on the line between us and my young men have danced the war dance. But it was not begun by us. It was you to send the first soldier and we who sent out the second. Two years ago I came upon this road, following the buffalo, that my wives and children might have their cheeks plump and their bodies warm. But the soldiers fired on us, and since that time there has been a noise like that of a thunderstorm and we have not known which way to go. So it was upon the Canadian. Nor have we been made to cry alone. The blue dressed soldiers and the Utes came from out of the night when it was dark and still, and for camp fires they lit our lodges. Instead of hunting game they killed my braves, and the warriors of the tribe cut short their hair for the dead. So it was in Texas. They made sorrow come in our camps, and we went out like the buffalo bulls when the cows are attacked. When we found them, we killed them, and their scalps hang in our lodges. The Comanches are not weak and blind, like the pups of a dog when seven sleeps old. They are strong and farsighted, like grown horses. We took their road and we went on it. The white women cried and our women laughed.

But there are things which you have said which I do not like. They were not sweet like sugar but bitter like gourds. You said that you wanted to put us upon reservation, to build our houses and make us medicine lodges. I do not want them. I was born on the prairie where the wind blew free and there was nothing to break the light of the sun. I was born where there were no inclosures [sic] and where everything drew a free breath. I want to die there and not within walls. I know every stream and every wood between the Rio Grande and the Arkansas. I have hunted and lived over the country. I lived like my fathers before me, and like them, I lived happily.

When I was at Washington the Great Father told me that all the Comanche land was ours and that no one should hinder us in living upon it. So, why do you ask us to leave the rivers and the sun and the wind and live in houses? Do not ask us to give up the buffalo for the sheep. The young men have heard talk of this, and it has made them sad and angry. Do not speak of it more. I love to carry out the talk I got from the Great Father [president of the US]. When I get goods and presents I and my people feel glad, since it shows that he holds us in his eye.

If the Texans had kept out of my country there might have been peace. But that which you now say we must live on is too small. The Texans have taken away the places where the grass grew the thickest and the timber was the best. Had we kept that we might have done the things you ask. But it is too late. The white man has the country which we loved, and we only wish to wander on the prairie until we die. Any good thing you say to me shall not be forgotten. I shall carry it as near to my heart as my children, and it shall be as often on my tongue as the name of the Great Father. I want no blood upon my land to stain the grass. I want it all clear and pure and I wish it so that all who go through among my people may find peace when they come in and leave it when they go out.

— Ten Bears

=== Treaty with the Cheyenne and Arapaho ===
Under the Little Arkansas Treaty of 1865, the Southern Cheyenne and Arapaho tribes had been assigned as a reservation those portions of Kansas and Indian Territory (present-day Oklahoma) between the Arkansas and Cimarron rivers and lying east of an imaginary line running north from Buffalo Creek on the Cimarron up to the Arkansas. Under the Medicine Lodge Treaty, their assigned territory was cut to less than half of the 1865-treaty territory, reduced to that land south of the Kansas state line, for a total of 4,300,000 acres (1,700,000 ha) of land. Additionally, the tribes were to be permitted to continue to hunt north of the Arkansas River for as long as the buffalo remained, as long as they stayed away from white settlements and roads. This concession was made to obtain participation of the Dog Soldiers to the treaty terms.

A separate treaty version for the Northern Cheyenne was created, but they did not sign, as they were allied with Red Cloud and the Oglala Lakota in hostilities against the US. The Cheyenne didn't properly understand the treaty. One cavalry captain said "The Cheyennes have no idea what they are giving up. The treaty amounts to nothing, and we will certainly have another war sooner or later with the Cheyennes, and probably with the other Indians, in consequence of the misunderstandings of the terms." One mixed-race interpreter feared for his mother's people: "This was, in a way, the most important treaty ever signed by the Cheyennes." he later wrote. "and it marked the beginning of the end of the Cheyenne as a free and independent warrior and hunter."

Southern Cheyenne chiefs signing

- O-to-ah-nac-co, Bull Bear
- Moke-tav-a-to, Black Kettle
- Nac-co-hah-ket, Little Bear
- Mo-a-vo-va-ast, Spotted Elk
- Is-se-von-ne-ve, Buffalo Chief
- Vip-po-nah, Slim Face
- Wo-pah-ah, Gray Head
- O-ni-hah-ket, Little Rock
- Ma-mo-ki, or Curly Hair
- O-to-ah-has-tis, Tall Bull
- Wo-po-ham, or White Horse
- Hah-ket-home-mah, Little Robe
- Min-nin-ne-wah, Whirlwind
- Mo-yan-histe-histow, Heap of Birds

Arapaho chiefs signing

- Little Raven
- Yellow Bear
- Storm
- White Rabbit
- Spotted Wolf
- Little Big Mouth
- Young Colt
- Tall Bear

== Unratified ==
The Medicine Lodge Treaty required the approval of 3/4 of the adult males on the reservation for any further cessions of land. In 1887 the Congress changed national policy on allotment of Native American lands by passing the Dawes Act, which promoted allotment of parcels to individual households (they thought 160 acres per household would be adequate for cultivation) to break up the communal land held by tribes, with the government authorized to sell the resulting "surplus". In the case of the southern Plains Indians, a commission was assigned to gain their agreement to such allotments and sales. The Jerome Agreement of 1892, although never ratified by the tribes, implemented the new allotment policy, effectively removing millions of acres from the reservation. The commission negotiating the agreement had evaded telling the Indians what the sale price would be. The Kiowa chief Lone Wolf sued the Secretary of the Interior on behalf of the entirety of the Kiowa, Comanche, and Apache tribes, based on their being defrauded by the government at the time.

The case, Lone Wolf v. Hitchcock, was ultimately decided by the US Supreme Court in 1903. In its ruling, the Court conceded that the Indians had not agreed to the land cessions. But, it concluded that the Congress had the "plenary power" to act unilaterally, so the circumstance did not matter. Its decision expressed the nineteenth-century attitude toward the Native Americans. Quoting from United States v. Kagama (1886) 118 U.S.375 in its ruling, the court reiterated the description of the Indian tribes as "wards of the nation... Dependent largely [on the United States] for their daily food... there arises the duty of protection, and with it the power."

== Aftermath ==
Following the Supreme Court decision, the Congress continued to make unilateral changes to reservation lands without getting agreement by the tribes, beginning in 1903 and 1904 with the Rosebud Indian Reservation in South Dakota. The Commissioner of Indian Affairs, then William Arthur Jones, noted his intention to proceed without Native American consent. As the historian Blue Clark found, Jones wrote that he planned to report officially on land bills before Congress in favor "of Congress taking the property of Indians without their consent." As another example, in 1907 Congress authorized the sale of "surplus" land at Rosebud, again without Indian consent.

The outstanding issues were challenged again in the mid-twentieth century, beginning in 1948. Combined Kiowa, Apache and Comanche representatives filed suit against the US government for compensation due to the original treaty and subsequent actions, including sales under the unratified Jerome Agreement. Over the following decades and through several claims, the tribes won substantial compensation of tens of millions of dollars from the Indian Claims Commission.

== Death Valley Days episode ==
The Medicine Lodge Treaty was dramatized in the 1962 episode, "The Truth Teller", of the syndicated television anthology series, Death Valley Days. In the episode, Barney Phillips was cast as General Winfield Scott Hancock and Charles Carlson as Wild Bill Hickok.

== See also ==
- Medicine Lodge Peace Treaty Site, a U.S. National Historic Landmark
