= Little Raven (Arapaho leader) =

Southern Arapaho chief

- Houu Hokeciih (Arapaho)
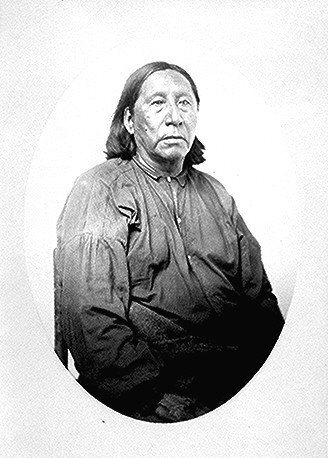
- Little Raven, some time between 1868 and 1874

Southern Arapaho leader

Personal details
- Born: c. 1810 Platte River, Nebraska
- Died: 1889 Cantonment (present-day Blaine County, Oklahoma)
- Children: Tato-Ka-Dan-Ska-Sun-Ka-Ku (son); White Antelope (son)
- Known for: negotiated peace between tribes, secured rights to Cheyenne-Arapaho Reservation

Little Raven (Arapaho: Houu Hokeciih), also known as Hosa (Young Crow), (born c. 1810 — died 1889) was from about 1855 until his death in 1889 a principal chief of the Southern Arapaho Indians. He negotiated peace between the Southern Arapaho and Cheyenne and the Comanche, Kiowa, and Plains Apache. He also secured rights to the Cheyenne-Arapaho Reservation in Indian Territory.

== Biography ==
Little Raven was born on the central Great Plains around 1810, perhaps along the Platte River in present-day Nebraska. He became a progressive leader known for his stately appearance and oratorical skills. In 1840, he mediated peace between the Southern Arapaho and Cheyenne and the Kiowa, Comanche, and Plains Apache. To aid his tribe's subsistence, in 1857 he sought agricultural tools and instruction from the United States government.

After the Pike's Peak Gold Rush of 1858 brought thousands of white miners to dig gold out of the Indians' land, the miners built a large village called Denver. Little Raven (as well as his neighboring chief, Chief Niwot) visited the Denver gold camp and welcomed the white settlers, maintaining a stance of peaceful coexistence with the whites. But, he expressed the hope that they would not stay after they had found all the yellow metal that they needed. The white settlers not only stayed but thousands more of them came. While in Denver, Little Raven learned some of the white man's ways, such as how to smoke cigars and eat meat with utensils. The Arapaho chiefs were so welcoming that the newcomers named the first county in the territory after the tribe, as well as streets in both Denver and Boulder.

Along with six chiefs of the Southern Cheyenne and three others of the Arapaho, Little Raven signed the Fort Wise Treaty on 18 February 1861, but he became frustrated when whites failed to comply with the agreement. In 1863, he toured Washington, D.C. During the summer of 1864, Little Raven took care to keep his band of Arapaho south of the Platte River and to avoid white soldiers and buffalo hunters by avoiding forts, trails, and settlements.

1864 saw Little Raven's disappointment with the United States turn to anger following the Sand Creek massacre. Little Raven and his band of Arapaho survived the massacre because they had camped far away from the other Cheyenne and Arapaho. Still, Little Raven sought peace in the form of the Little Arkansas Treaty on 17 October 1865, and when this treaty was broken less than 18 months later, he accepted the Medicine Lodge Treaty on 28 October 1867. He would not sign it until the Cheyennes had signed it. The treaty allotted the Southern Arapaho a reservation between the Arkansas and Cimarron rivers in Indian Territory (present-day Oklahoma).

Following the Battle of the Washita on 27 November 1868, Little Raven led the Southern Arapaho to Fort Sill for protection. Then the Southern Arapaho and Southern Cheyenne were granted a reservation in western Indian Territory. Little Raven again toured Washington, D.C., and other Eastern cities, in 1871. He spoke before a large audience at the Cooper Union for the Advancement of Science and Art in New York City. President Ulysses S. Grant even offered him a peace medal, but Little Raven declined, saying that he had no peace talk to make because he had never been at war with whites. Little Raven influenced the Southern Arapaho to remain neutral during the Red River War of 1874-75.

Eventually Little Raven settled at Cantonment in present-day Blaine County, Oklahoma, where the old military hospital served as his home. Little Raven died at Cantonment in 1889. His remains are interred at the Fort Sill Post Cemetery in Oklahoma.

Little Raven Street in Riverfront Park between 15th and 20th Street in Denver, near the South Platte River, commemorates him.

== Quotes ==
I would like to shake hands with the white men, but I am afraid they do not want peace with us.

It will be a very hard thing to leave the country that God gave us. Our friends are buried there, and we hate to leave these grounds. ... There is something strong for us — that fool band of soldiers that cleared out our lodges and killed our women and children. This is hard on us. There at Sand Creek — White Antelope and many other chiefs lie there; our women and children lie there. Our lodges were destroyed there, and our horses were taken from us there, and I do not feel disposed to go right off to a new country and leave them.

— Little Raven at the signing of the Little Arkansas Treaty

== Bibliography ==
- Brown, Dee (1970). Bury My Heart at Wounded Knee. New York: Holt, Rinehart & Winston. ISBN 0-330-23219-3.
