= Smoke hole =

Hole in the roof of a building

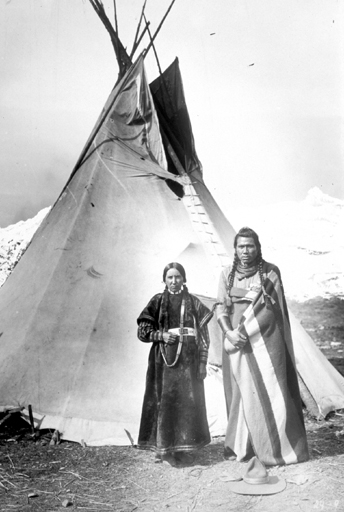
A tipi of the Nez Perce tribe, c. 1900. The excess fabric at the top of the structure is the smoke hole and smoke flaps.

A smoke hole (smokehole, smoke-hole) is a hole in a roof for the smoke from a fire to vent. Before the invention of the smoke hood or chimney, many dwellings had smoke holes to allow the smoke from the hearth to escape. Pre-modern English homes with unglazed windows or thatch roofs required no special vent for smoke. These structures typically had only one story for living spaces, and inhabitants made do with a band of relatively clear air near the ground.

== Smoke holes in buildings ==
Smoke holes were often built in a way such they would not leak water such as with a covering or in the gables. In the Native American long house, smoke holes occur in intervallic square openings along the roof.

== Smoke holes for tents ==
In Native American plains style tipi, the smoke hole consisted of one easily accessible smoke flap vent which was positioned around the apex of the interior beams and the flaps were extended outward on poles to open the vent. In modern ceremonial tipis this vent is in the traditional fashion.

Sami tents called a lavvu also have a smoke hole from which smoke from a campfire is vented out the top. Unlike the Native American tipi however, there are no smoke flaps, just a round hole at the top of the tent.

== Gallery ==
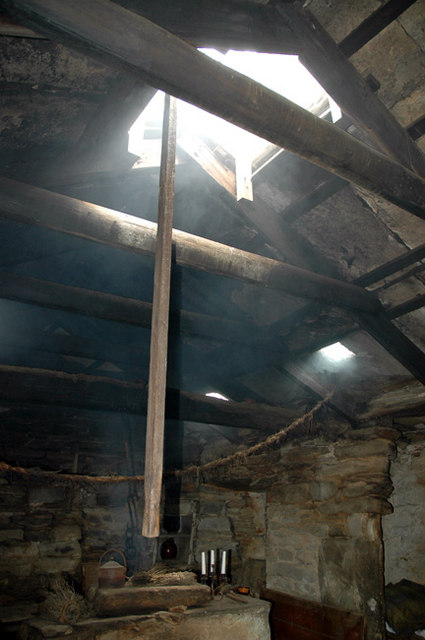
A large "open chimney" in a longhouse on Orkney.

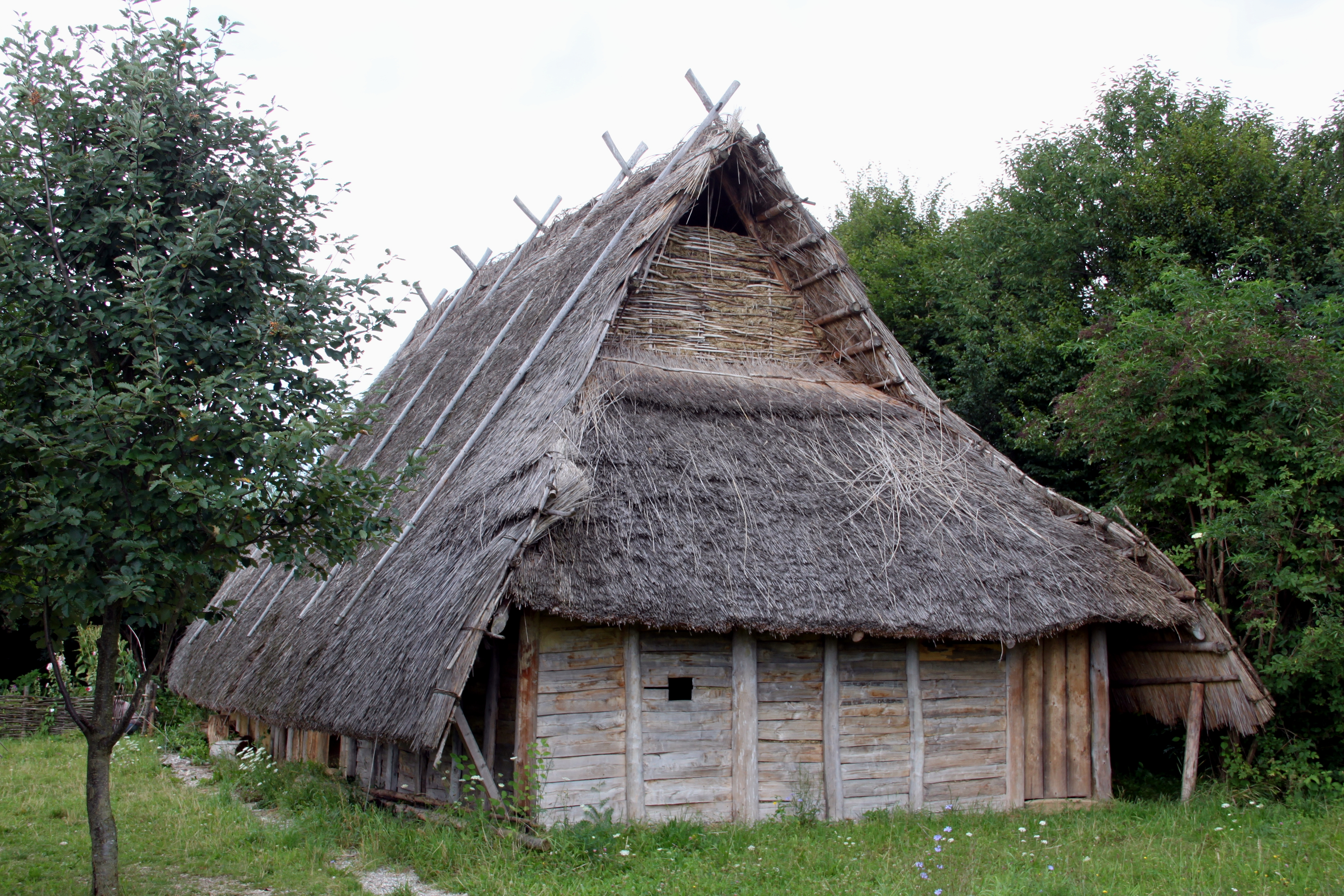
The smoke hole at the top of the gable in a reconstruction of a longhouse from the Middle Ages in Germany. Image: LepoRello (Wikipedia)

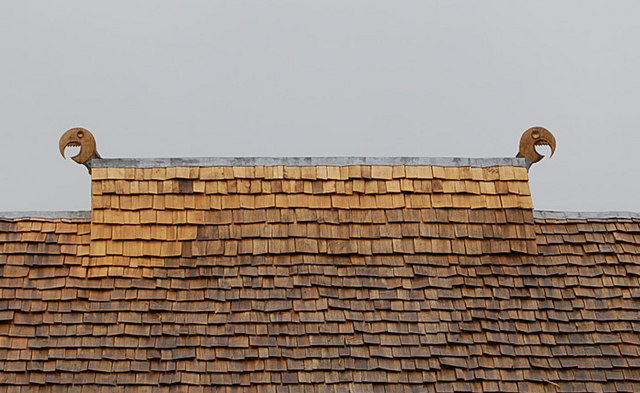
A "smoke outlet" in a reconstruction of a Viking longhouse at the Ancient Technology Centre, Cranborne, England

== In popular culture ==
In the book It by Stephen King, the members of the losers club build a pit in their club, which they fill with green branches and set them on fire to create smoke. One of them talks about the ritual use of smoke-holes by Native Americans.
