= Alice Littleman =

Kiowa beader and garment maker from Oklahoma, U.S.(1910–2000)

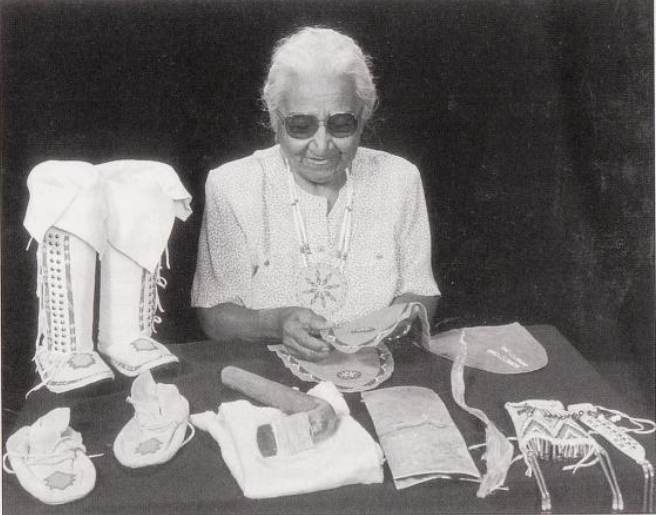
- ca. 1989, U. S. Department of the Interior photograph
- Born: Alice Jones; February 8, 1910; Anadarko, Oklahoma
- Died: May 26, 2000 (aged 90); Chickasha, Oklahoma
- Other name: Alice Jones Littleman
- Citizenship: Kiowa Tribe of Oklahoma and US
- Occupations: beadwork artist, regalia maker
- Years active: 1927–2000
- Children: 1

Alice Littleman (February 8, 1910 – May 26, 2000) was a Kiowa beadwork artist and regalia maker, who during her lifetime was recognized as one of the leading Kiowa beaders and buckskin dressmakers. Her works are included in the permanent collections of the National Museum of Natural History, the National Museum of the American Indian, the Southern Plains Indian Museum, and the Oklahoma Historical Society.

== Early life ==
Alice Jones was born on February 8, 1910, in the Old Town district of Anadarko, Oklahoma, to To-haddle-mah (English name: Anna Konad) and Tommy Jones. She was the second child in a family of three other siblings: Mary Hummingbird (b. 1907), Iva Jones (1912–1914), and Vernon S. Keahbone (b. 1919). They grew up on their maternal grandparents' land in West McKinley Township, Caddo County, Oklahoma, about five miles northwest of Anadarko. Her family was Kiowa, and she descended from Tohausen III, through her grandfather Konad (Páu:t’áiñ or White Buffalo). Her grandmother Dome-be-ah-ty, taught Jones the art of tanning buckskin and making dresses, hightop moccasin, and tipis.

Jones's mother, Anna, who taught at the Riverside Indian School and supervised the Works Progress Administration's Mau-Tame Club, taught Jones how to bead. The club was a beading society established by the Bureau of Indian Affairs' field matron Susie Peters to preserve the beading practices of the Kiowa and give the tribe a creative outlet for their works. Dome-be-ah-ty had taught Anna beadwork, as it was customary for the knowledge to be passed from mothers and grandmothers to their daughters and granddaughters. Anna was highly skilled and won prizes at the annual Gallup Inter-tribal Indian Ceremonial exhibition in Gallup, New Mexico, and she exhibited at the 1939 Golden Gate International Exposition in San Francisco, California. Jones attended the rural Washita School, but left school after completing the eighth grade to care for her grandparents.

== Career ==
In 1927, Susie Peters was taking a group of Kiowa dancers to participate in the Gallup Inter-tribal. Jones' mother suggested that she make a purse and enter it in the event. Her entry won the first prize in the beadwork category, and Jones sent her mother the $50 prize money.

Jones had her only child, Robert "Bobby" Hill (Kiowa-Apache) in 1933, who would become a nationally renowned artist, painting under the name White Buffalo. Later she married Robert Littleman, a Southern Cheyenne beadwork artist from Chickasha, Oklahoma. In 1968, the Indian Arts and Crafts Board commissioned her create a series of experimental works to demonstrate quality beadwork. Four of these as well as nine other samples of her beadwork were presented at a solo exhibition at the Southern Plains Indian Museum in 1970. The following year, both she and her son Bobby were invited to participate in the Contemporary Southern Plains Indian Art exhibition hosted by the National Cowboy Hall of Fame in Oklahoma City.

Into her 60s, Littleman tanned her own hides in the time-honored, arduous ten-day process. After removing the meat, she stretched the skin on a rack for three to four days to dry and then scraped the hair from the hide. Treating the leather with a paste of boiled brains and liver, ground and mixed with lard, the hide was left to cure for two to three days in the sun. After soaking the skin overnight, she began scraping the water out of the skin and hand-stretching the leather. The hide was stretched both vertically and horizontally until it was soft, white in color, and dry. If she was unable to finish the stretching in a single day, the wet hide had to be wrapped to prevent it drying out. Completing the preparation, Littleman then hand-dyed the hide and began beading. Following the historical protocols for garment making, her dresses were tied, not sewn. Her beading was done with waxed buckskin strips, as thread was not an Indigenous material, and she used both cut beads with faceted sides to produce sparkle and seed beads with dull finishes.

Her selection of colors and designs were fundamental to Littleman's beading. Because of their proximity at the Anadarko Indian Agency, beadworkers of the Caddo Nation, Cheyenne and Arapaho Tribes, Comanche Nation, Delaware Nation, Fort Sill Apache Tribe, Apache Tribe of Oklahoma (Kiowa Apache), and the Wichita and Affiliated Tribes all incorporate geometric shapes into their designs and use similar techniques. Nonetheless, designs remained identifiable by tribal heritage and did not homogenize. Typical Kiowa designs used by Littleman included leaf motifs, and she paid particular attention to color placement to ensure that her designs were visible from a distance. She created more than 50 buckskin dresses, adorned with fringe tipped with metal cones, medallions set in horizontal rows of beads, and leaf motifs, taking care to balance the elements in the overall composition.

During her lifetime, Littleman was honored as one of the premier Kiowa beaders and dressmakers, with other artists often claiming kinship ties to her. Journalist Suzette Brewer compared her skill to the artistic masters Van Gogh, Rembrandt, and Picasso, stating "Alice Littleman is to Southern Plains beadworking what these masters are to painting". Among her over 50 awards and honors, Littleman won the 1979 Best of Class for a beaded buckskin ensemble including a dress, leggings, and purse from the O'odham Tash, an annual festival of the Tohono O'odham held in Casa Grande, Arizona, and a 1989 featured demonstration at the Smithsonian's National Museum of Natural History. For the demonstration, JoAllyn Archambault, director of the American Indian Program of the National Museum of Natural History, commissioned Littleman to bead a pair of men's high-top sneakers with cut beads. In 1991 Littleman and her mother (posthumously) were two of the featured artists at the Pouches, Pipebags and Purses exhibition of the Southern Plains Indian Museum and in 1992 she was designated as a Master Artist by the Oklahoma Arts Council.

In her later career, Littleman demonstrated beading at museums and universities and trained her grandnieces in beading and sewing. She also taught the Kiowa language, wanting to preserve the oral use of her first language with a vocabulary so difficult that even she did not write it. Her work toured throughout the United States and Europe, and Littleman was the subject of both a British and Japanese documentary. Her work is part of the permanent collections of the Southern Plains Indian Museum and her most treasured honor was having one of her buckskin dresses selected for the collections of the Smithsonian Institution at the National Museum of Natural History. In 1993, Littleman was recognized for her lifetime achievements as the guest of honor of the Twin Eagles Powwow in Minden, Louisiana.

== Death and legacy ==
Littleman died on May 26, 2000, at Grady Memorial Hospital in Chickasha, Oklahoma, and was buried a week later as done by tradition in Memory Lane Cemetery of Anadarko. A collection of her papers and photographs are located at the Western History Collection of the University of Oklahoma Libraries. In 2006, another of Littleman's buckskin dresses, which had been made for Keri Jhane Myers (Comanche), was purchased by the Smithsonian for their permanent collections at the National Museum of the American Indian.
