= Kiowa =

Native American tribe in Oklahoma

Kiowa Tribe G̶áuigú
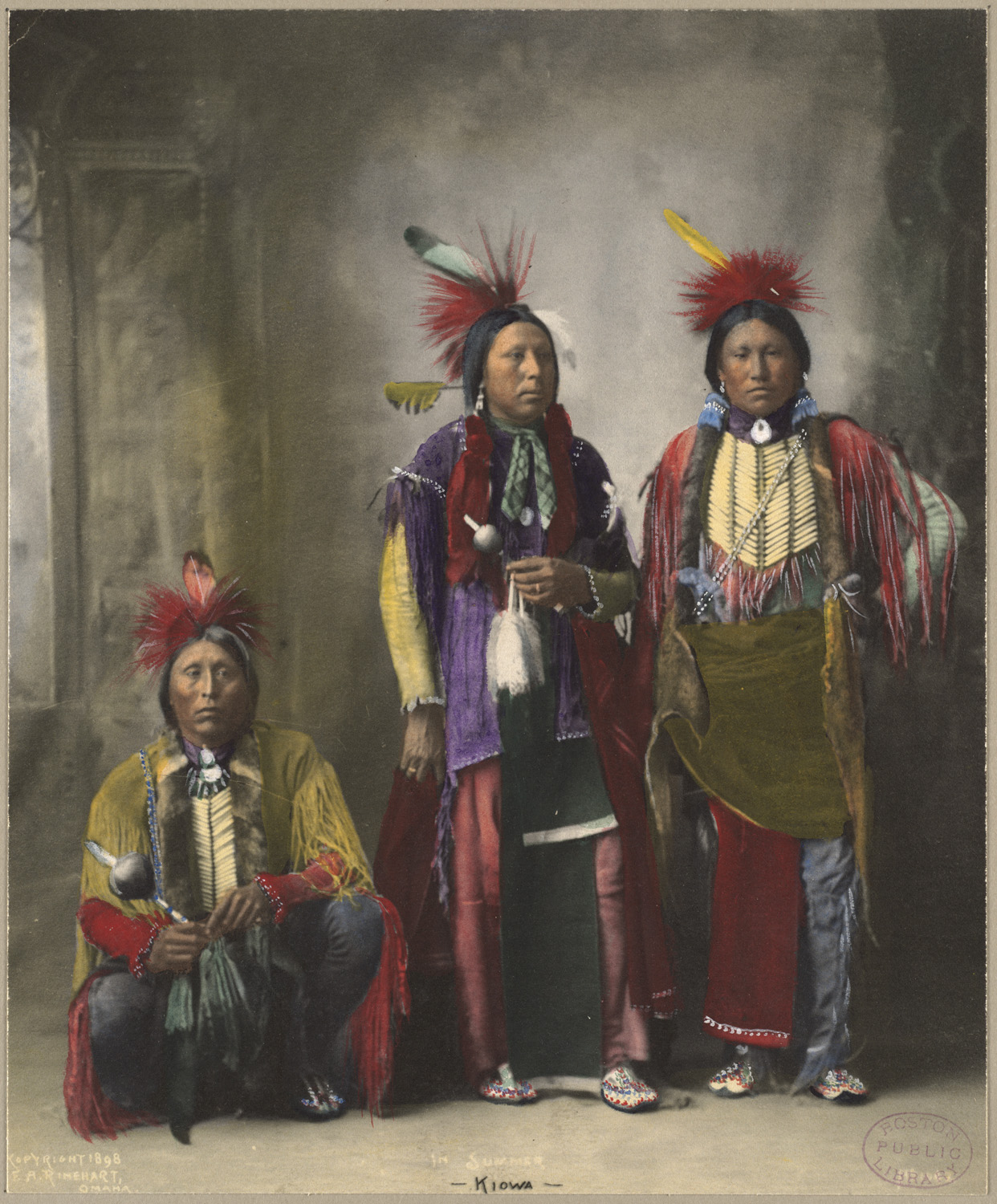
- Three Kiowa men in 1898

Total population
- 12,000 (2011)

Regions with significant populations
- United States (Oklahoma)

Languages
- English, Kiowa, Plains Sign Talk

Religion
- Native American Church, traditional tribal religion, Sun Dance, Christianity

Kiowa (/ˈkaɪ.əwə, -wɑː, -weɪ/ KY-ə-wə, -wah) or G̶áuigú (Kiowa pronunciation: [kɔ́jɡʷú]) people are a Native American tribe and an Indigenous people of the Great Plains of the United States. They migrated southward from western Montana into the Rocky Mountains in Colorado in the 17th and 18th centuries and eventually into the Southern Plains by the early 19th century. In 1867, the Kiowa were forced to a reservation in Southwestern Oklahoma.

Anthropologists have debated how an equestrian plains tribe like the Kiowa, having migrated from Montana, shared linguistic ancestry with the Tanoan speaking Pueblo peoples of the southwest. One hypothesis is that before residence in western Montana, they descended from the Jumanos. Another hypothesis, claimed more consistent with Kiowa oral tradition, is that "the Kiowa speech community originated in the Eastern Fremont area around 450 CE, drifted northward to the Yellowstone area after 1300 CE, and then migrated south and east to the Southern Plains during historic times."

Today, they are federally recognized as Kiowa Tribe with headquarters in Carnegie, Oklahoma. They were formerly known as the Kiowa Indian Tribe of Oklahoma. As of 2011, there were 12,000 Kiowa tribal citizens.

The Kiowa language (G̶áuid̶òᵰ꞉gyà), part of the Tanoan language family, is in danger of extinction, with only 20 speakers as of 2012. As of 2024, the Kiowa have a Kiowa Language Department.

In the early 18th century, the Plains Apache lived around the upper Missouri River and maintained close connections to the Kiowa. They were ethnically different and spoke different languages. The allied nations communicated using Plains Sign Talk and accompanied one another on their migration into the Southern Plains.

== Name ==
- Person: g̶áuikʼì / [gáuikʼì (m), g̶áuimà꞉ / [gáuimà꞉ (f)
- People: g̶áuigú / [gáuigú
- Language: g̶áuid̶òᵰ꞉gyà / [gáui[dòñ꞉gyà
- Country: G̶áuidàumgya / [Gáuidàumgya

In the Kiowa language, the Kiowa call themselves ([kɔ́j–gʷú]), spelled variously as G̶áuigyú, [Gáuigyú, Cáuigú, Ka'igwu, Gáuigú, or Gaigwu, most given with the speculated meaning "Principal People." The first part of the name is the element [kɔ́j] (spelled G̶áui-, Ǥáui-, [Gáui-, Kae-, Cáui-, Gáui-, or Gai-) which simply means 'Kiowa'. Its origin is lost. The second element -gua/gú [–gʷú] (or [–gʷúɔ̯] in older Kiowa) is a plural marker.

Ancient names of the tribe were Kútd̶àu or Kwu-da ([kʰʷút–tɔ̀]) ("emerging" or "coming out rapidly") and Tépdàu: or Tep-da ([tʰép+dɔ̀ː]), relating to the tribal origin narrative of a creator pulling people out of a hollow log until a pregnant woman got stuck. Later, they called themselves Kòmb̶àubîn̶:dàu or Kom-pa-bianta ([kòmpɔ̀+bį̂ː–dɔ̀]) (tipi flap+big–plural) for "people with large tipi flaps", before they met Southern Plains tribes or before they met white men.

In English, Kiowa is pronounced KI-o-wa (/ˈkaɪ.oʊ.wə/); KI-o-wə (/ˈki.oʊ.wə/) is considered improper. The English name derives from how the Comanches would say /kɔ́j–gʷú/ in their language. Some older Kiowas will say Kiowa as KI-wah (/ˈkaɪ.wɑː/).

In Plains Indian Sign Language, Kiowa is expressed by holding two straight fingers near the lower outside edge of the right eye and moving these fingers back past the ear. This corresponded to the ancient Kiowa hairstyle cut horizontally from the lower outside edge of the eyes to the back of their ears. This was a practical way to prevent their hair from getting tangled while shooting an arrow from a bowstring. George Catlin painted Kiowa warriors with this hairstyle.

== Language ==
The Kiowa language is a member of the Kiowa-Tanoan language family. The relationship was first proposed by Smithsonian linguist John P. Harrington in 1910 and was definitively established by Ken Hale in 1967. Parker McKenzie, born in 1897, was a noted authority on the Kiowa language, learning English only when he began school. He collaborated with John P. Harrington, who credited him as the first author of jointly published work at a time when Native consultants were seldom acknowledged. Later, he also worked with Laurel Watkins on the Kiowa language. He went on to discuss the etymology of words and insights into how the Kiowa language changed to incorporate new items of material culture. McKenzie's letters on pronunciation and grammar of the Kiowa language are in the National Anthropological Archives.

Kiowa (/ˈkaɪ.əwə/) or G̶áuid̶òᵰ꞉gyà / [Gáui[dò̱:gyà ("language of the G̶áuigú (Kiowa)") is a Tanoan language spoken by Kiowa people, primarily in Caddo, Kiowa, and Comanche counties.

Additionally, the Kiowa were one of the numerous nations across the U.S., Canada, and Mexico that spoke Plains Sign Talk. Originally a trade language, it became a language in its own right that remained in use across North America.

== Government ==
Map of Kiowa Tribe's tribal jurisdictional area (OTSA) and nearby jurisdiction areas. Shared with Comanche Nation, Apache Tribe of Oklahoma and Fort Sill Apache Tribe of Oklahoma.

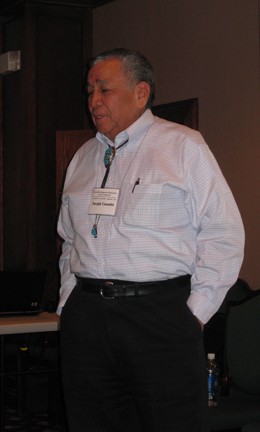
J.T. Goombi, former Kiowa tribal chairman and first vice-president of the National Congress of American Indians

The Kiowa Indian Tribe of Oklahoma is headquartered in Carnegie, Oklahoma. Their tribal jurisdictional area includes Caddo, Comanche, Cotton, Jackson, Kiowa, Tillman, Greer and Harmon Counties. Enrollment in the tribe requires a minimum blood quantum of one-quarter Kiowa descent.

As of 2025, the current administration is:

- Chairman: David Sullivan
- Vice Chairman: Vacant
- Secretary: Kathie Kent
- Treasurer: Terri Landis
- 1st Council: Clint Kissee
- 2nd Council: Shawn Daugherty
- 3rd Council: Cliff Carpenter

== Economic development ==
The Kiowa tribe issues its own vehicle tags. As of 2011, the tribe owns one smoke shop, the Morningstar Steakhouse and Grill, Morningstar Buffet, The Winner's Circle restaurant in Devol, Oklahoma, and Kiowa Bingo near Carnegie, Oklahoma.

The tribe owns three casinos, the Kiowa Casino in Carnegie, in Verden, and the Kiowa Casino and Hotel Red River in Devol (approximately 20 minutes north of Wichita Falls, Texas).

== Culture ==
Kiowa musicians.

Originally from the Northern Plains and migrating to the Southern Plains, Kiowa society follows bilateral descent, where both maternal and paternal lines are significant. They do not have clans but have a complex kinship-based system and societies based on age and gender.

Tipis, conical lodges made from hide or later canvas, provided lightweight, portable housing. They hunted and gathered wild foods and traded with neighboring agrarian tribes for produce. The Kiowa migrated seasonally with the American bison because it was their main food source. They also hunted antelope, deer, turkeys, and other wild game. Women collected varieties of wild berries and fruit and processed them with prepared meats to make pemmican. Dogs were used to pull travois and rawhide parfleche that contained camping goods for short moves. The Kiowa tended to stay in areas for long periods of time.

When they adopted horse culture after acquiring horses from Spanish rancherias south of the Rio Grande, the Kiowa revolutionized their lifeways. They had much larger ranges for their seasonal hunting, and horses could carry some of their camping goods. The Kiowa and Plains Apache established a homeland in the Southern Plains, adjacent to the Arkansas River in southeastern Colorado and western Kansas and the Red River drainage of the Texas Panhandle and western Oklahoma.

The Kiowa use Plantago virginica to make garlands or wreaths for old men to wear around their heads during ceremonial dances as a symbol of health.

=== Art ===
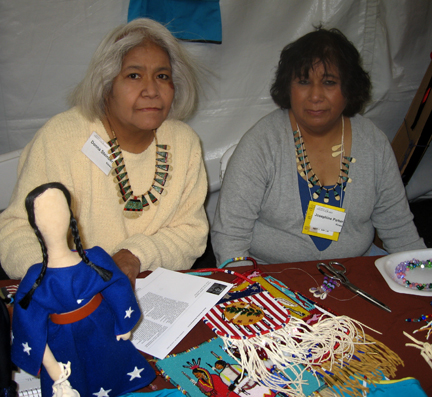
Donna Standing Steinberg, Kiowa/Wichita, and Josephine Parker, Kiowa, with their beadwork

Documentation of the history and development of contemporary Kiowa art formulates one of the most unusual records in Native American culture. As early as 1891, Kiowa artists were being commissioned to produce works for display at international expositions. The "Kiowa Six" were some of the earliest Native Americans to receive international recognition for their work in the fine art world. They influenced generations of Indian artists among the Kiowa, and other Plains tribes. Traditional craft skills are not lost among the Kiowa people today and the talented fine arts and crafts produced by Kiowa Indians helped the Oklahoma Indian Arts and Crafts Cooperative flourish over its 20-year existence.

==== Ledger art and hide painting ====
Early Kiowa ledger artists were those held in captivity by the U.S. Army at Fort Marion in St. Augustine, Florida (1875–1878), at the conclusion of the Red River War, which also is known as the Southern Plains Indian War. Ledger art emerges from the Plains hide painting tradition. These Fort Marion artists include Kiowas Etadleuh Doanmoe and Zotom, who was a prolific artist who chronicled his experiences before and after becoming a captive at the fort. After his release from Fort Marion, Paul Zom-tiam (Zonetime, Koba) studied theology from 1878 until 1881, when he was ordained as a deacon in the Episcopal church.

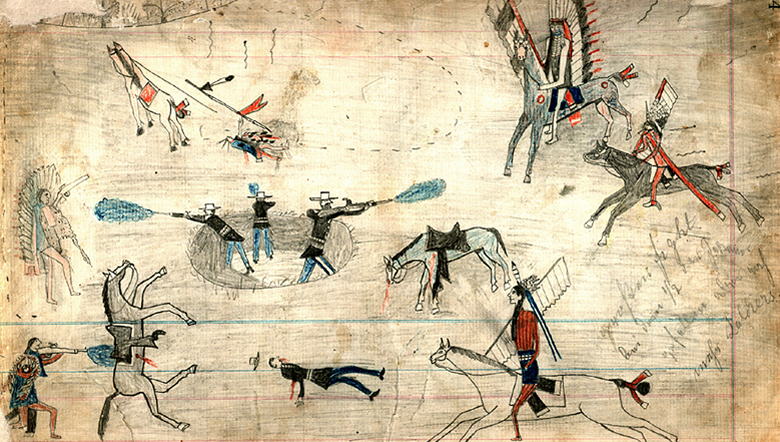
A Kiowa ledger drawing possibly depicting the Buffalo Wallow battle in 1874, a fight between Southern Plains Indians and the U.S. Army during the Red River War.

==== Kiowa Six ====
Following in Silver Horn's footsteps were the Kiowa Six, or, as they have been known in the past, the Kiowa Five. They are Spencer Asah, James Auchiah, Jack Hokeah, Stephen Mopope, Lois Smoky Kaulaity, and Monroe Tsatoke. Coming from the area around Anadarko, Oklahoma, these artists studied at the University of Oklahoma. Lois Smoky left the group in 1927, but James Auchiah took her place in the group. The Kiowa Six gained international recognition as fine artists by exhibiting their work in the 1928 International Art Congress in Czechoslovakia and then participated in the Venice Biennale in 1932.

==== Painters and sculptors ====
Besides the Kiowa Six and Silver Horn, Kiowa painters active in the 20th and 21st centuries include Sharron Ahtone Harjo, Homer Buffalo, Charley Oheltoint, Michael C. Satoe Brown, T. C. Cannon, Wilson Daingkau, George Geionty, Bobby Hill (1933–1984), Harding Bigbow (1921–1997), Jim Tartsah, Mirac Creepingbear (1947–1990), Herman Toppah, Ernie Keahbone, C. E. Rowell, Dixon Palmer, Roland Whitehorse, Blackbear Bosin, Woody Big Bow (1914–1988), Parker Boyiddle Jr. (1947–2007), Dennis Belindo (1938–2009), Clifford Doyeto (1942–2010), Al Momaday, George Keahbone, Joe Lucero (Hobay), Ladonna Tsatoke Silverhorn, R.G. Geionty, Huzo Paddelty, Keri Ataumbi, David E. Williams. Micah Wesley. Thomas Poolaw, Tennyson Reid, Sherman Chaddlesone (1947–2013), Cruz McDaniels, II (1950–2020), Robert Redbird (b. 1939), Gus Hawziptaw, Gerald Darby, Lee Tsatoke Jr., N. Scott Momaday, and Barthell Little Chief.

==== Beadwork artists ====
Noted Kiowa beadwork artists include Lois Smoky Kaulaity, Donna Jean Tsatoke, Alice Littleman, Nettie Standing, Marilyn Yeahquo, Edna Hokeah Pauahty, Leona Geimasaddle, Barry D. Belindo, Kathy Littlechief, Katherine Dickerson, Charlie Silverhorn, Paul McDaniels Jr., Eugenia McDaniels, Kiowa J. Taryole, Grace Tsontekoy, Richard Aitson, Judy Beaver, Vanessa Paukeigope Jennings, Leatrice Geimasaddle, Teri Greeves, and Tahnee Ahtone.

==== Authors ====
Kiowa author N. Scott Momaday won the 1969 Pulitzer Prize for his novel House Made of Dawn. Richard Aitson (Kiowa/Kiowa Apache) was a published poet. Other Kiowa authors include playwright Hanay Geiogamah, poet and filmmaker Gus Palmer Jr., Alyce Sadongei, Marian Kaulaity Hansson, Tocakut, Russell Bates, and Tristan Ahtone.

==== Musicians and composers ====
Kiowa music often is noted for its hymns that historically were accompanied by dance or played on the flute. Noted Kiowa composers of contemporary music include James Anquoe, noted for his contributions to Native American culture. Contemporary Kiowa musicians include Cornel Pewewardy, Tom Mauchahty-Ware, and Terry Tsotigh.

==== Photographers ====
Early Kiowa photographers include Parker McKenzie and his wife Nettie Odlety, whose photographs from 1913 are in the collection of the Oklahoma History Center. Kiowa photographer Horace Poolaw (1906–1984) was one of the most prolific Native American photographers of his generation. He documented the Kiowa people living near his community in Mountain View, Oklahoma, beginning the 1920s. His legacy is continued today by his grandson, Thomas Poolaw, a prominent Kiowa photographer and digital artist.

==== Image gallery ====
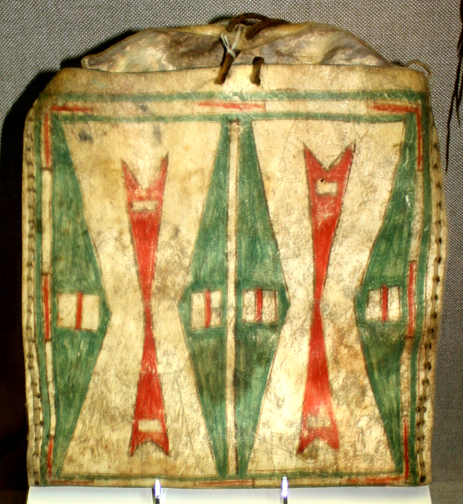
Kiowa parfleche, ca. 1890, Oklahoma History Center

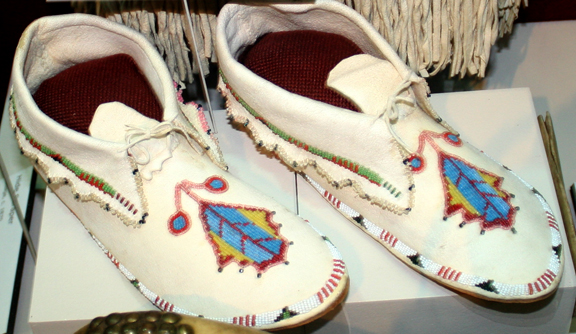
Kiowa beaded moccasins, ca. 1920, OHS

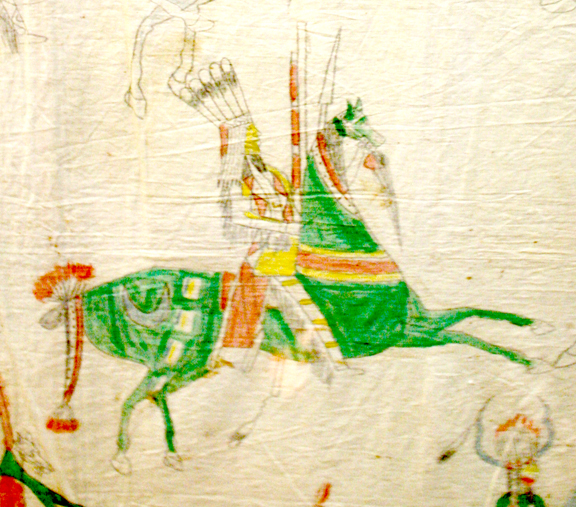
Detail of painting by Silver Horn (Kiowa), ca. 1880

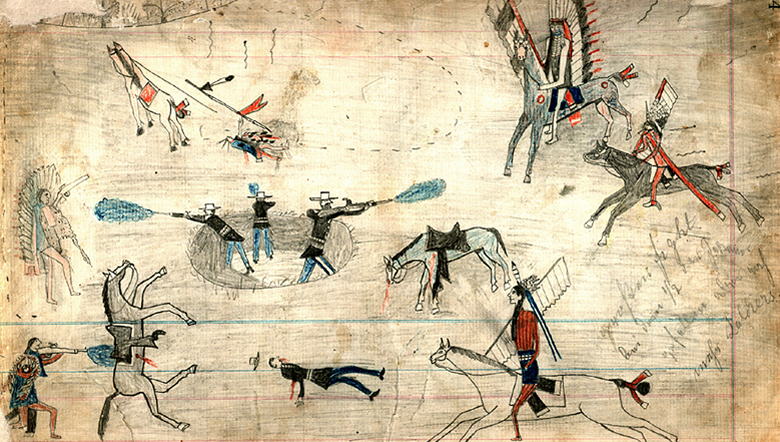
Kiowa ledger art, ca. 1874

Kiowa cradle.

=== Cuisine ===
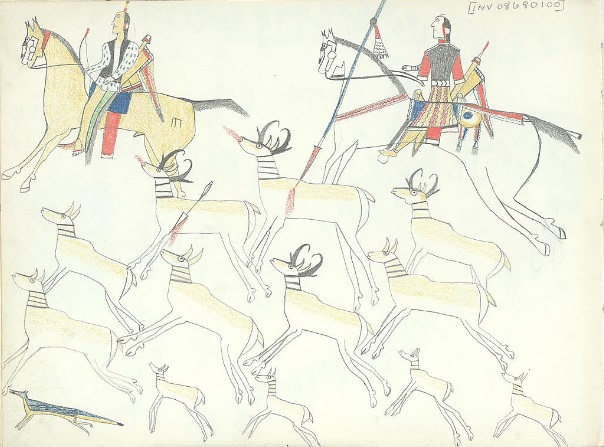
Ledger drawing of mounted Kiowa hunters hunting pronghorn antelope with bows and lance, c.1875–1877.

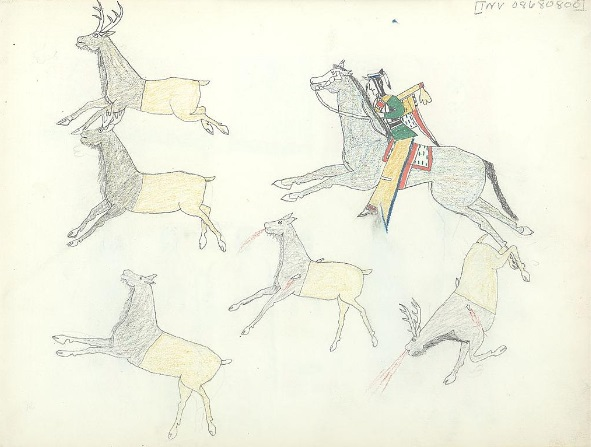
Kiowa hunting elk on horseback, c. 1875–1877

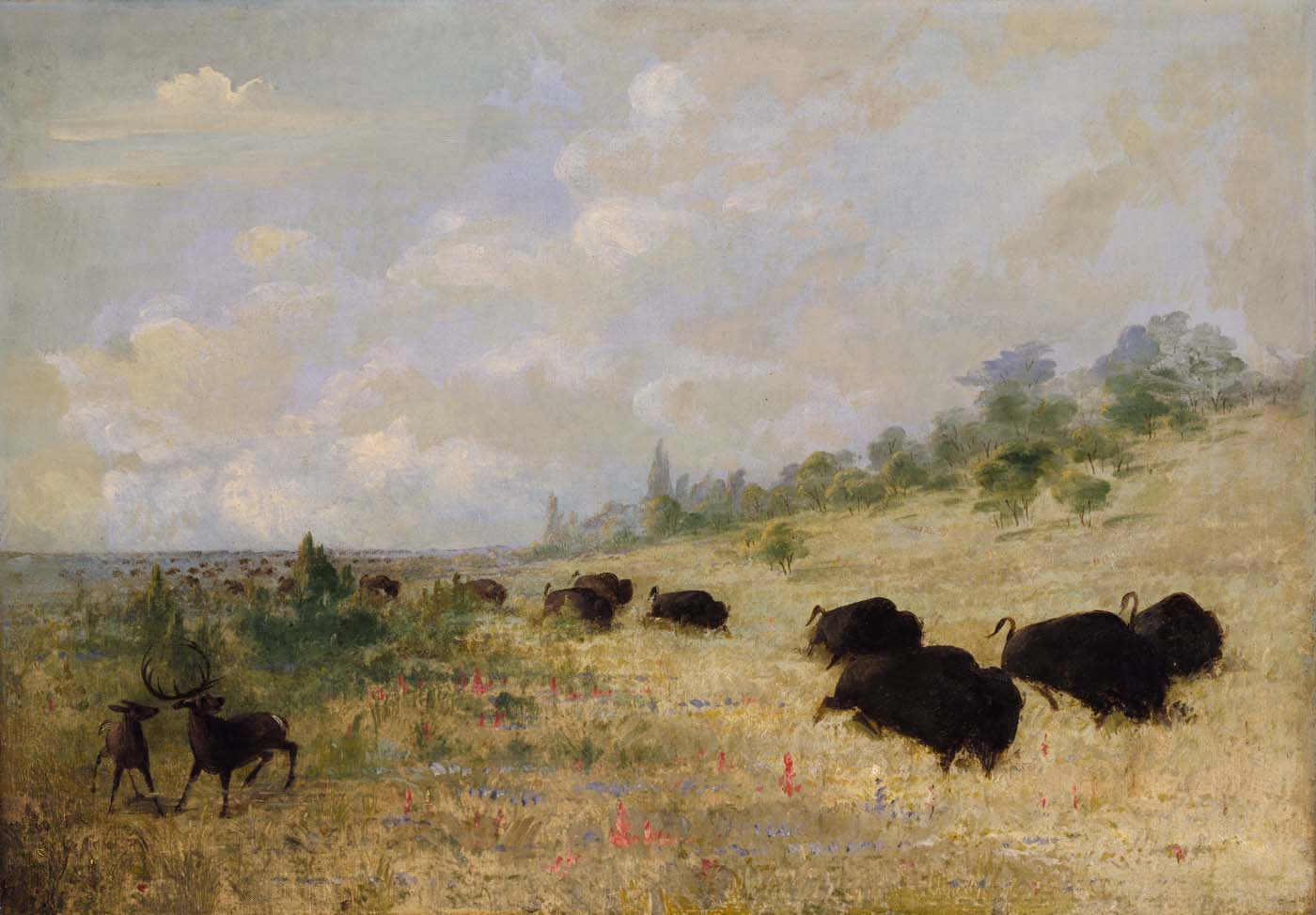
Elk and Buffalo Grazing among Prairie Flowers 1846–48, painted by George Catlin in Texas.

The Kiowa historically had a nomadic hunter-gatherer society. They shared a similar cuisine with their neighboring Plains tribes, such as the Comanche. The most important food source for the Kiowa and fellow plains nations was the American bison or buffalo. Before the introduction of horses, the Plains tribes hunted bison on foot. Hunting required the hunter to get as close as possible to the target before shooting with arrows or using the long lance. Occasionally, they wore the skins of wolves or coyotes to hide their approach toward the bison herds.

Hunting bison became far easier after the Kiowa acquired horses. Bison were hunted on horseback and the men used bows and arrows to take them down, as well as long lances to pierce the hearts of the animals. The women prepared bison meat in a variety of ways: roasted, boiled, and dried. Dried meat was prepared into pemmican, for sustenance while the people were on the move. Pemmican is made by grinding dried lean meat into powder, then mixing a near-equal weight of melted fat or tallow and sometimes berries. The pemmican was shaped into bars and kept in pouches until ready to eat. The Kiowa sometimes ate certain parts of the bison raw. Other animals hunted included deer, elk, pronghorn, wild mustang, wild turkey, and bears. During times of scarce game, the Kiowa would eat small animals such as lizards, waterfowl, skunks, snakes, and armadillos. They raided ranches for Longhorn cattle and horses to eat during difficult times. They also acquired horses for traveling, hunting, and fighting their enemies.

Within Kiowa society, men did most of the hunting. Women were responsible for gathering wild edibles such as berries, tubers, seeds, nuts, vegetables, and wild fruit but could choose to hunt if they wanted to. Plants important to Kiowa cuisine include pecans, prickly pear, mulberries, persimmons, acorns, plums, and wild onions. They acquired cultivated crops, such as squash, maize, and pumpkin, by trading with and raiding various Indian peoples, such as the Pawnee people, living on the western edge of the Great Plains. Prior to acquiring metal pots from Europeans, the Kiowa cooked boiled meat and vegetables through a process of lining a pit in the earth with animal hides, filling that with water, and adding fire-heated rocks.

=== Sheltering in place and mobile ===
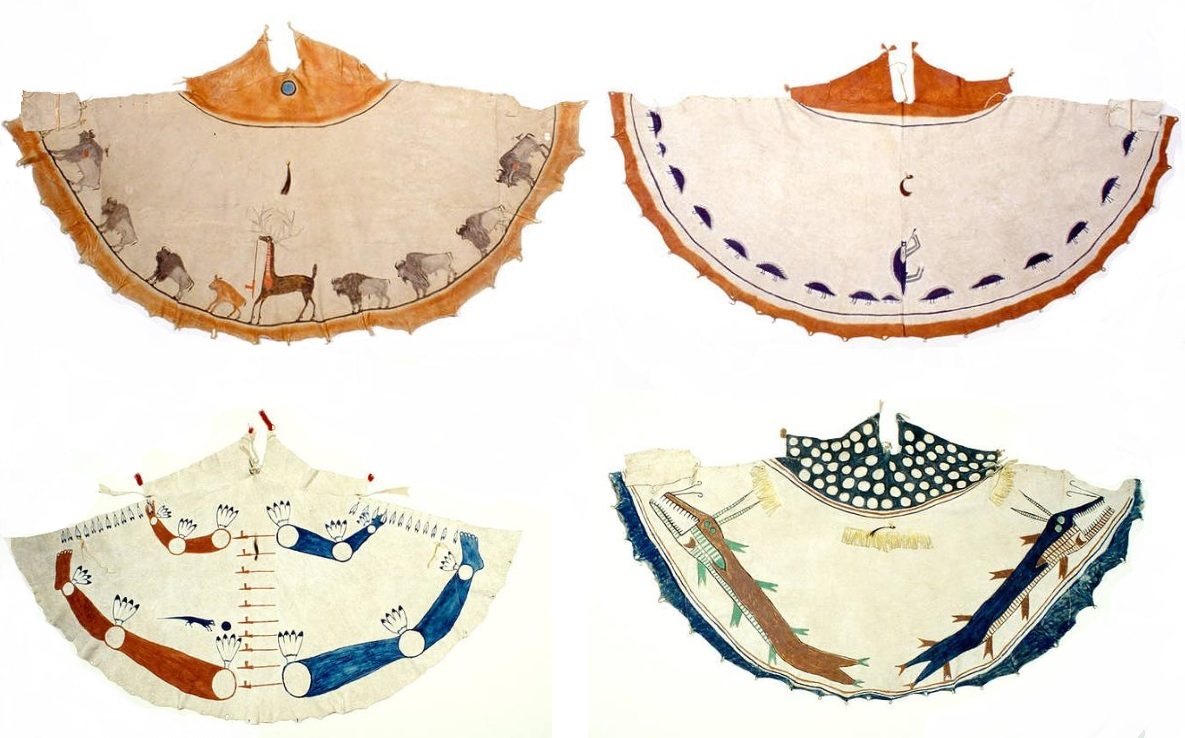
Four Kiowa tipis with designs, 1904. Top L to R, bison herd and pipe-smoking deer; porcupines; bottom, L to R: arms and legs with pipes and lizard; mythical water monsters.

The main form of shelter used by the Kiowa was the tipi or skin lodge. Tipis were made from bison hides shaped and sewn together in a conical shape. Wooden poles called lodge poles from 12–25 feet (3.7–7.6 m) in length are used as support for the lodge. Lodge poles are harvested from red juniper and lodgepole pine. Tipis have at least one entrance flap. Smoke flaps were placed at the top so that smoke could escape from the fire pit within. The floor of the tipi was lined with animal pelts and skins for warmth and comfort. The tipi is designed to be warm inside during the cold winter months and cool inside during the warm summer. Tipis are easily collapsed and can be raised in minutes, making it an optimal structure for nomadic people like the Kiowa and other Plains Indian nations. The poles of the tipi were used to construct a travois during times of travel. Hide paintings often adorn the outside and inside of the tipis, with special meanings attached to certain designs.

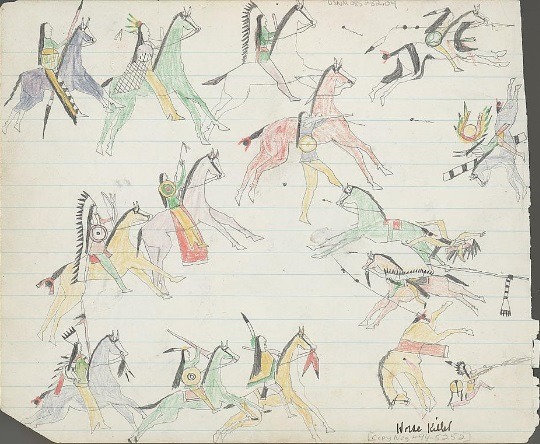
Ledger drawing of Kiowas engaging in horse mounted warfare with traditional enemy forces, 1875.

Before the introduction of the horse to North America, the Kiowa and other plains peoples used domestic dogs to carry and pull their belongings. Tipis and belongings, as well as small children, were carried on travois, a frame structure using the tipi poles and pulled by dogs and later horses.

The introduction of the horse to Kiowa society revolutionized their way of life. They acquired horses by raiding rancheros south of the Rio Grande into Mexico, as well as by raiding other Indian peoples who already had horses, such as the Navajo and the various Pueblo people. With the horse, they could transport larger loads, hunt more game over a wider range and more easily, and travel longer and farther. The Kiowa became powerful and skilled mounted warriors who conducted long-distance raids against enemies. The Kiowa were considered among the finest horsemen on the Plains. A man's wealth was measured primarily by the size of his horse herd, with particularly wealthy individuals having herds numbering in the hundreds. Horses were targets of capture during raids. The Kiowa considered it an honor to steal horses from enemies, and such raids often served as a rite of passage for young warriors. They adorned their horses with body paint from the medicine man for ritual and spiritual purposes, such as good fortune and protection during battle. Kiowa horses were also often decorated with beaded masks (sometimes with bison horns attached to the sides) and feathers in their manes. Mules and donkeys were also used as means of transportation and wealth; however, they were not as esteemed.

=== Sociopolitical organization ===
Lone Wolf, Kiowa chief.

Kiowas, Sante Fe railway.

Kiowa mother and child.

Sleeping Wolf and wife.

Kiowa woman.

Kiowa man.

The Kiowa had a well structured tribal government like most tribes on the Northern Plains. They had a yearly Sun Dance gathering and an elected head-chief who was considered to be a symbolic leader of the entire nation. Warrior societies and religious societies were important to Kiowa society and carried out specific roles. Chiefs were chosen based on bravery and courage shown in battle as well as intelligence, generosity, experience, communication skills, and kindness to others. The Kiowa believed that the young fearless warrior was ideal. The entire tribe was structured around this individual. The warrior was the ideal to which young men aspired. Because of these factors, the Kiowa were of utmost importance in the history of the Southern Plains.

The women gain prestige through the achievements of their husbands, sons, and fathers, or through their own achievements in the arts. Kiowa women tanned, skin-sewed, painted geometric designs on parfleche and later beaded and quilled hides. The Kiowa women took care of the camp while the men were away. They gathered and prepared food for winter months, and participated in key ritual events. Kiowa men lived in the families of their wives' extended families. Local groups (d̶o:b̶àud̶o:gáu or d̶ó:dáu) were led by the d̶ò:b̶àud̶ó:k’ì: or chief.

The Kiowa had two political subdivisions (particularly with regard to their relationship with the Comanche):

- T’ó:k’yàñhyòp, also spelled Thóqàhyòp/Thóqàhyòi and To-kinah-yup ("Northerners", lit. 'Men of the Cold' or 'Cold People', 'northern Kiowa', lived along the Arkansas River and the Kansas border, comprising the more numerous northern bands)
- Sálk'áhyóp/Sálk'áhyói, also spelled Sálqáhyóp/Sálqáhyói ("Southerners", lit. 'Hot People', 'southern Kiowa', lived in the Llano Estacado (Staked Plains), Oklahoma Panhandle and Texas Panhandle, allies of the Comanche).

As the pressure on Kiowa lands increased in the 1850s, the regional divisions changed. A new regional grouping emerged:

- the Gwa-kelega or Gúhàlèg̶áuigú ('Wild Mustang Kiowa' or 'Gúhàlè Kiowa', they were named for the large mustang herds in the territory of the Kwahadi (Quohada) Band of the Comanche, this Comanche Band was known to them as Gúhàlé:gyâig̶ù – 'Wild Mustang People', with which they were living in close proximity during the last resistance to white settlement on the Southern Plains).

After the death of the high chief Dohäsan in 1866, the Kiowa split politically into a peace faction and a war faction. War-bands and peace-bands developed primarily based on their proximity to Fort Sill (Ts’ó:k’áudáu:há:gyà – 'At Medicine Bluff', lit. 'Rock Cliff Medicine At Soldiers Collective They Are') and their degree of interaction.

Kiowa bands within the tipi ring during the annual Sun Dance (called K’áu:d̶ó):

- Kâtá or Qáutjáu ('Biters', lit. Arikara, because they had a strong trading history with the Arikara people and some families have had Arikara kin; this is the most powerful and largest Kiowa band)
- Kogui or Qógûi ('Elks Band')
- Kaigwa or Cáuigú ('Kiowa Proper')
- Kinep / Kí̱bi̱dau / Kíbìdàu ('Big Shields') or Khe-ate / Kí̱ːet / Kíèt ('Big Shield'), also known as Káugyabî̱dau / Kāugàbîdāu ('Big Hides / Robes')
- Semat / Sémhát ('Stealers' or 'Thieves', Kiowa name for their allies, the Kiowa Apache, during the Sun Dance also called Taugûi – 'Sitting (at the) Outside')
- Soy-hay-talpupé / Sáuhédau-talyóp ('Blue Boys') or Pahy-dome-gaw / Pái-dome-gú ('Under-the-Sun-Men') (smallest Kiowa band)

During the Sun Dance, some bands had special obligations. These were traditionally defined as follows:

The Kâtá had the traditional right (duty or task) to supply the Kiowa during the Sun Dance with enough bison meat and other foods. This band was particularly wealthy in horses, tipis and other goods. The famous Principal Kiowa chiefs Dohäsan (Little Mountain) and Guipago (Lone Wolf) were members of this band.

The Kogui were responsible for conducting the war ceremonies during the Sun Dance. There were numerous famous families and leaders known for their military exploits and bravery, such as Ad-da-te ("Islandman"), Satanta (White Bear), and Kicking Bird, and the war chiefs Big Bow (Zepko-ete) and Stumbling Bear (Set-imkia).

The Kaigwu were the guardians of the Sacred or Medicine bundle (Tai-mé, Taimay) and the holy lance. Therefore, they were respected and enjoyed a special prestige.

The Kinep or Khe-ate were often called "Sun Dance Shields", because during the dance, they observed police duties and ensured security. The chief Woman's Heart (Manyi-ten) belonged to this band.

The Semat were allowed to participate equally, but had no specific duties and obligations during the Sun Dance.

=== Enemies and warrior culture ===
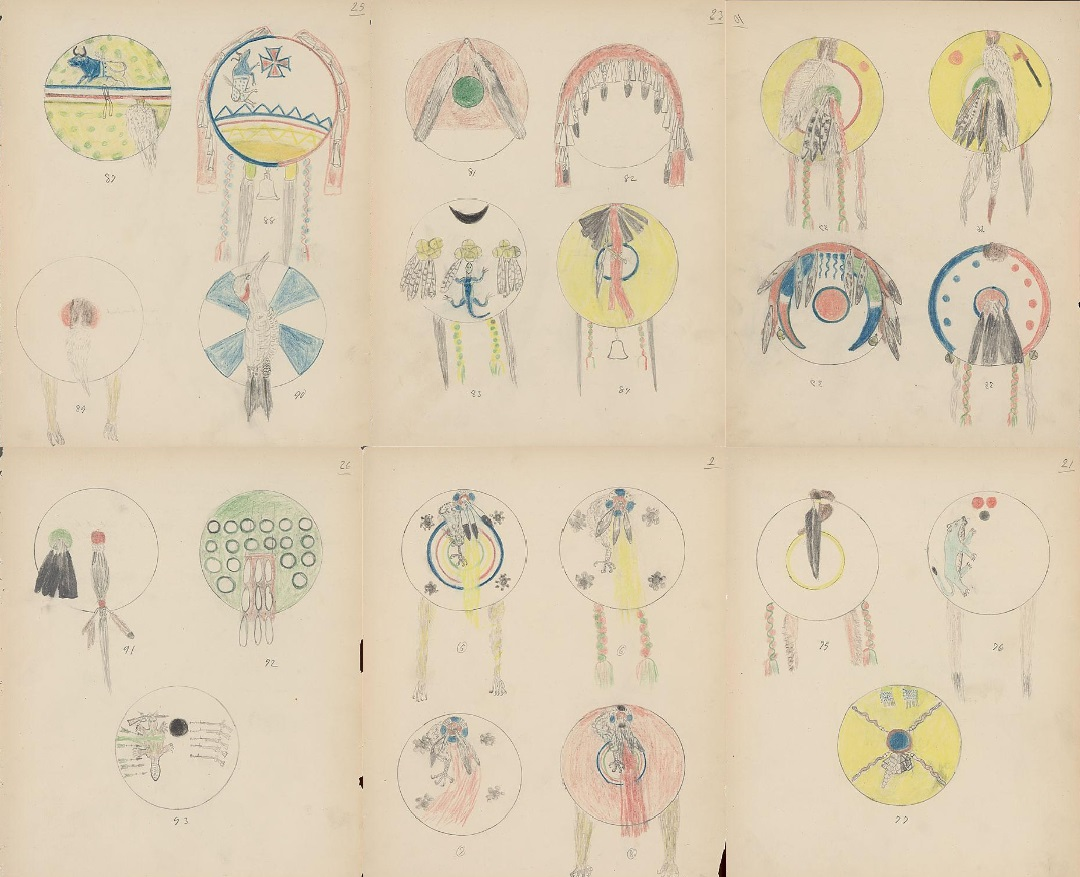
Ledger drawings by Silver Horn featuring a collection of Kiowa shield designs, 1904.

Typical of the Plains Indians during the horse culture era, the Kiowa were a warrior people. They fought frequently with enemies, both neighboring and far beyond their territory. The Kiowa were notable for their long-distance raids extending south into Mexico and north onto the Northern Plains. Almost all warfare took place on horseback. The Kiowa's enemies included the Cheyenne, Arapaho, Navajo, Ute, and occasionally the Lakota to the north and west of Kiowa territory. East of Kiowa territory, they fought with the Pawnee, Osage, Kickapoo, Kaw, Caddo, Wichita, and Sac and Fox. To the south, they fought with the Lipan Apache, Mescalero Apache, Chiricahua Apache (whom the Kiowa called the Do’-ko’nsenä’go, "People of the turned-up moccasins"), and Tonkawa. The Kiowa also clashed with American Indian nations from the Southeastern and Northeastern Woodlands who were forcibly removed to Indian Territory during the Indian Removal period, including the Cherokee, Choctaw, Muskogee, and Chickasaw.

The Cheyenne and Arapaho later made peace with the Kiowa. Together, they formed a powerful alliance with the Comanche and the Plains Apache to fight invading white settlers and U.S. soldiers, as well as Mexicans and the Mexican Army.

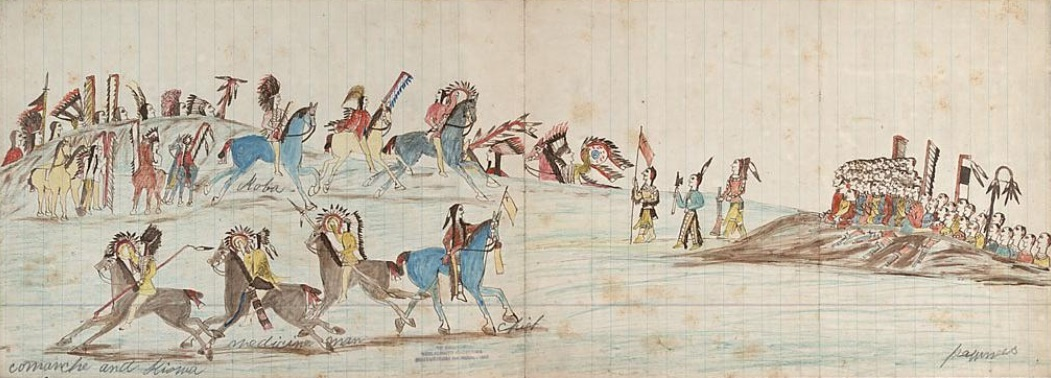
Ledger drawing depicting a meeting between a Kiowa–Comanche war party and a Pawnee war party (right side).

Like other Plains Indians, the Kiowa had specific warrior societies. Young men who proved their bravery, skill, or displayed their worth in battle were often invited to one of the warrior societies. In addition to warfare, the societies worked to keep peace within the camps and tribe as a whole. There were six warrior societies among the Kiowa. The Po-Lanh-Yope (Little Rabbits) was for boys; all young Kiowa boys were enrolled. The group mostly served social and education purposes, involving no violence or combat. The Adle-Tdow-Yope (Young Sheep), Tsain-Tanmo (Horse Headdresses), Tdien-Pei-Gah (Gourd Society), and Ton-Kon-Gah (Black Legs or Leggings) were adult warrior societies. The Koitsenko (Qkoie-Tsain-Gah, Principal Dogs or Real Dogs) consisted of the ten most elite warriors of all the Kiowa who were elected by the members of the other four adult warrior societies.

Kiowa warriors used a combination of traditional and nontraditional weapons, including long lances, bows and arrows, tomahawks, knives, and war clubs, as well as the later acquired rifles, shotguns, revolvers, and cavalry swords. Shields were made from tough bison hide stretched over a wooden frame, or they were made from the skull of bison, which made a small, strong shield. Shields and weapons were adorned with feathers, furs, and animal parts, such as eagle claws for ceremonial purposes.

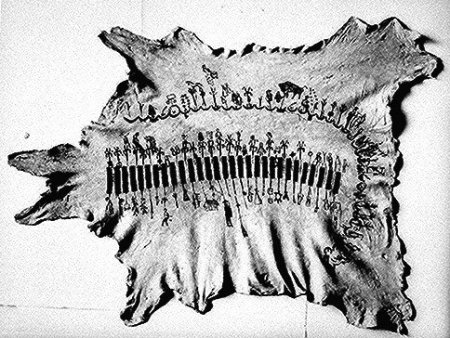
Calendar of 37 months, 1889–92, kept on a skin by Anko, ca. 1895

=== Kiowa calendars ===
The Kiowa people told ethnologist James Mooney that the first calendar keeper in their tribe was Little Bluff, or Tohausan, who was the principal chief of the tribe from 1833 to 1866. Mooney also worked with two other calendar keepers, Settan (Little Bear) and Ankopaaingyadete (In the Middle of Many Tracks), commonly known as Anko. Other Plains tribes kept pictorial records, known as "winter counts".

The Kiowa calendar system is unique: they recorded two events each year, offering a finer-grained record and twice as many entries for any given period. Silver Horn (1860–1940), or Haungooah, was the most highly esteemed artist of the Kiowa tribe in the 19th and 20th centuries. He kept a calendar and was a respected religious leader in his later years.

=== Funeral practices ===
In Kiowa tradition, death had strong associations with dark spirits and negative forces, which meant that the death of an individual was seen as a traumatic experience. Fear of ghosts in Kiowa communities stemmed from the belief that spirits commonly resisted the end of their physical life. The spirits were thought to remain around the corpse or its burial place, as well as haunt former living spaces and possessions. Lingering spirits were also believed to help encourage the dying to cross from the physical world to the afterlife. The fear of ghosts can be seen in the way skulls were treated, which was believed to be a source of negative spiritual contamination that invited danger to the living. Due to the fears and risks associated with death, the community's reactions were instantaneous and vicious. Families and relatives were expected to demonstrate grief through reactions such as wailing, ripping off clothes and shaving of the head. There have also been accounts of self-induced body lacerations and finger joints being cut. In the process of grief, women and the widowed spouse were expected to be more expressive in their mourning.

The body of the deceased must be washed before burial. The washer, historically a woman, also combs the hair and paints the face of the dead. Once the body has been treated, a burial occurs promptly. When possible, the burial takes place on the same day, unless the death occurs at night. In this case the dead is buried the following morning. A quick burial was believed to reduce the risk of spirits remaining around the burial site. After the burial, most of the belongings of the dead were burned along with their tipi. If their tipi or house was shared with family, the surviving relatives moved into a new house.

=== Spiritual Beliefs ===
One Kiowa origin story says that the Kiowa people came to the world through a hollow log, but then a pregnant woman got stuck in it, preventing any more people from coming through.

== History ==
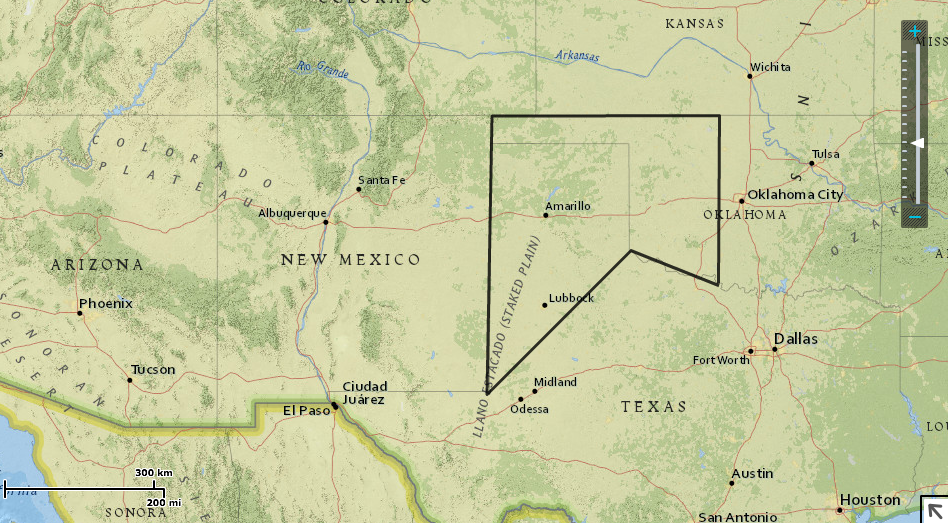
1865 Treaty Map

As members of the Kiowa-Tanoan language family, the Kiowa at some distant time likely shared an ethnic origin with the other Amerindian nations of this small language family: Tiwa, Tewa, Towa, and others. In historic times, the Kiowa lived in a hunter-gatherer economy unlike the sedentary pueblo societies of the Tanoan peoples. The Kiowa recount their origins as near the Missouri River, and the Black Hills. They record that they were driven south by pressure from the Sioux.

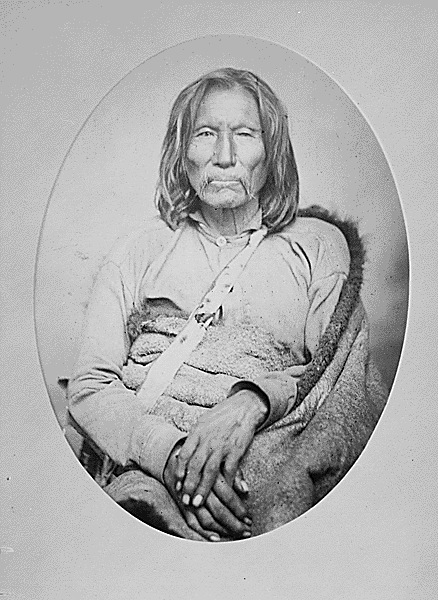
Sitting Bear, Kiowa chief

For the earliest recorded — and recounted — history of the Kiowa, see further below.

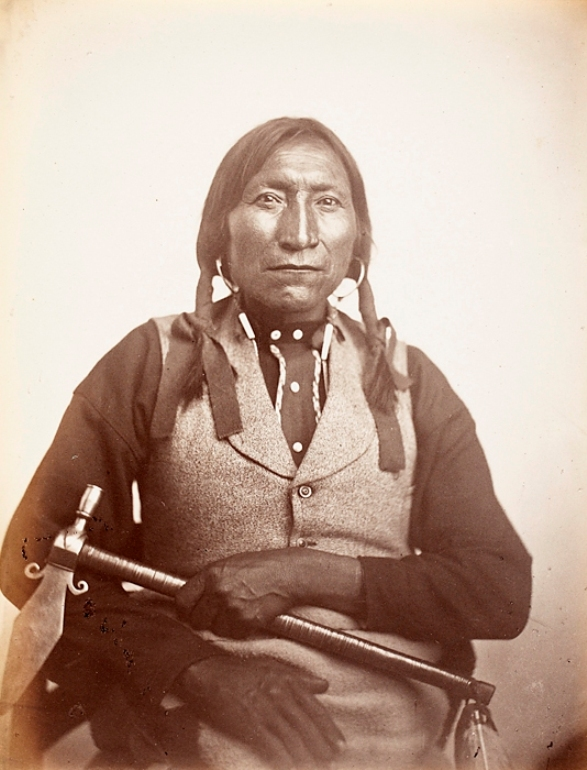
Guipago, Kiowa chief

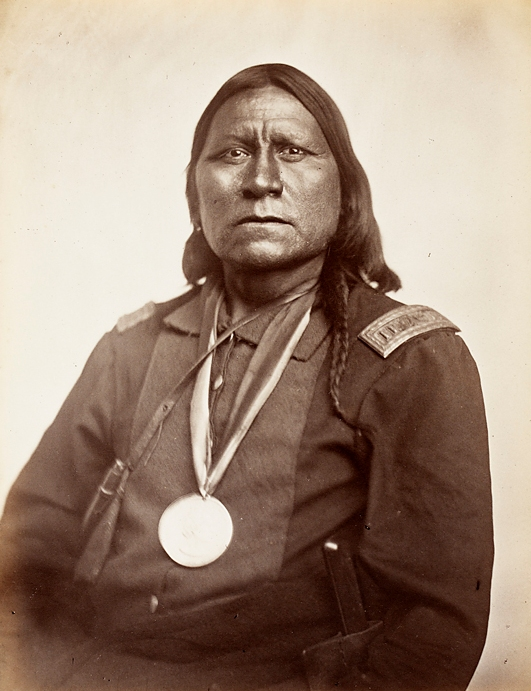
Satanta, Kiowa chief

Kiowa Apache chief.

Following A'date, famous Kiowa leaders were Dohäsan (D̶ohausan, Over-Hanging Butte, alias Little Mountain, alias Little Bluff); Satank (Sét:àñ:gyà, Sitting Bear), Guipago (G̶ûib̶à:gàui, Lone Wolf The Elder, alias Rescued From Wolves), Satanta (Set:t’aiñde, White Bear), Tene-angopte (T’è:néáungopd̶e, Kicking Bird), Zepko-ete (Zépg̶àuiètd̶è, Big Bow), Set-imkia (Sét:èmk’iañ, Stumbling Bear), Manyi-ten (Mà:yíñ:tèndè, Woman's Heart), Napawat (No Mocassin), Mamanti (G̶áuñ:mâmáñ:d̶è, Walking-above), Tsen-tainte (Tsêñt’àiñ:dè, White Horse), Ado-ete (Á:dàuiétd̶è, Big Tree).

Dohasan, who is also known as Touhason, is considered by many to be the greatest Kiowa Chief (1805–1866), as he unified and ruled the Kiowa for 30 years. He signed several treaties with the United States, including the Fort Atkinson Treaty of July 27, 1852, and the Little Arkansas Treaty of 1865. Guipago became the head chief of the Kiowa when Dohosan (Little Bluff) named him as his successor. Guipago and Satanta, along with an elderly Satank, led the warring faction of the Kiowa nation, while Tene-angopte and Napawat led the peaceful party.

In 1871, Satank, Satanta and Big Tree (translated in some documents as Addo-etta) helped lead the Warren Wagon Train Raid. They were arrested by United States soldiers and transported to Jacksboro, Texas. En route, near Fort Sill, Indian Territory, Satank killed a soldier with a knife and was shot by cavalry troops while trying to escape. Satanta and Big Tree were later convicted of murder by a "cowboy jury".

In September 1872, Guipago met with Satanta and Ado-ete, the visit being one of Guipago's conditions for accepting a request to travel to Washington and meet President Grant for peace talks. Guipago eventually got the two captives released in September 1873. Guipago, Satanta, Set-imkia, Zepko-ete, Manyi-ten, Mamanti, Tsen-tainte and Ado-ete led Kiowa warriors during the "Buffalo war" along the Red River, together with the Comanche allies, in the summer (June–September) 1874. They surrendered after the Palo Duro Canyon fight. Tene-angopte had to select 26 Kiowa chiefs and warriors to be deported; Satanta was sent to a prison in Huntsville, Alabama, while Guipago, Manyi-ten, Mamanti, Tsen-tainte, and others were sent to St. Augustine, Florida, at what was then known as Fort Marion. Tene-angopte, damned by the "medicine-man" Mamanti, died in May 1875; Satanta committed suicide at Huntsville in October 1878. Guipago, having fallen sick with malaria, was jailed in Fort Sill, where he died in 1879.

The sculptor of the Indian Head nickel, James Earle Fraser, is reported to have said that Chief Big Tree (Adoeette) was one of his models for the U.S. coin; it was minted from 1913 through 1938.

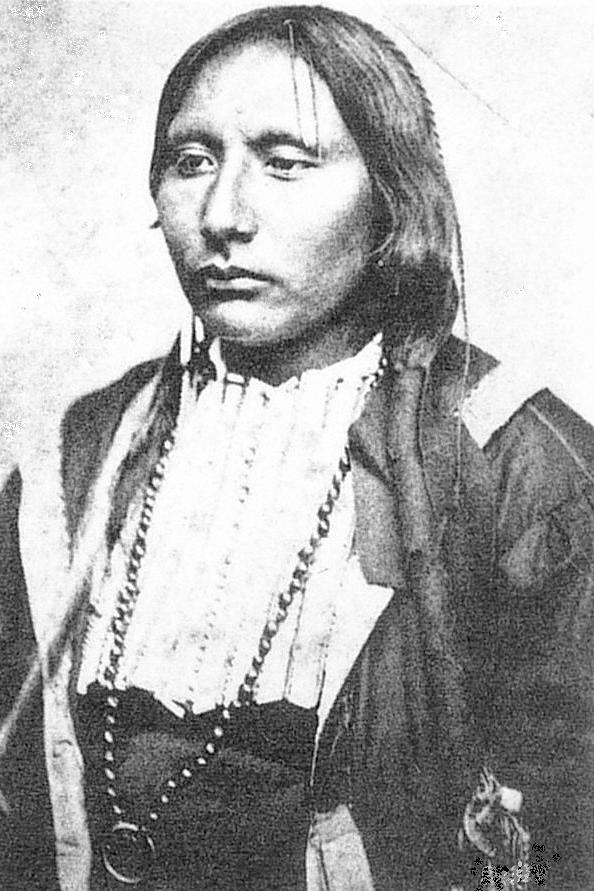
Big Tree, a Kiowa chief and warrior

=== Early history and migration south ===
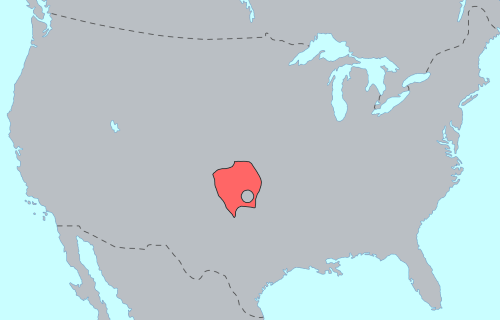
The Southern Plains territory of the Kiowa Nation at the time of European contact (see text for migrations).

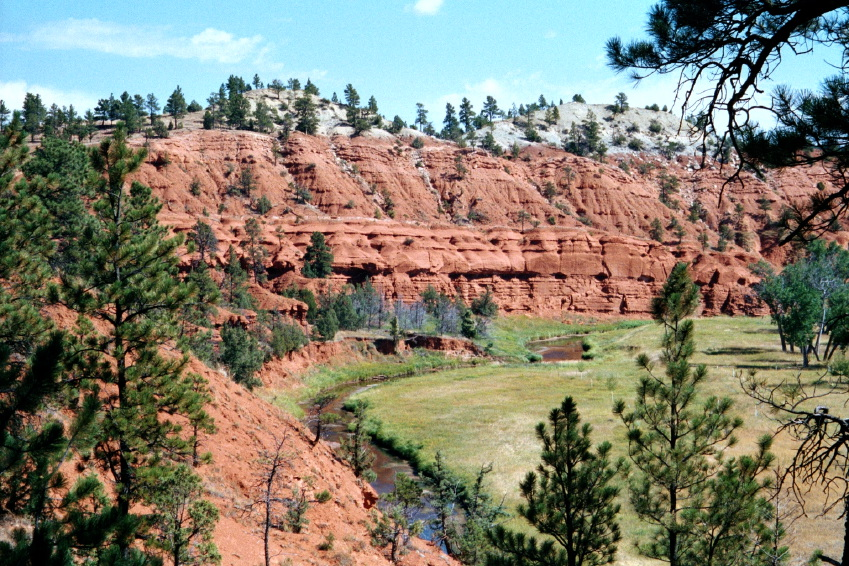
Red sandstone cliffs in the Black Hills Wyoming, former Kiowa territory which remains a sacred area to them in modern times.

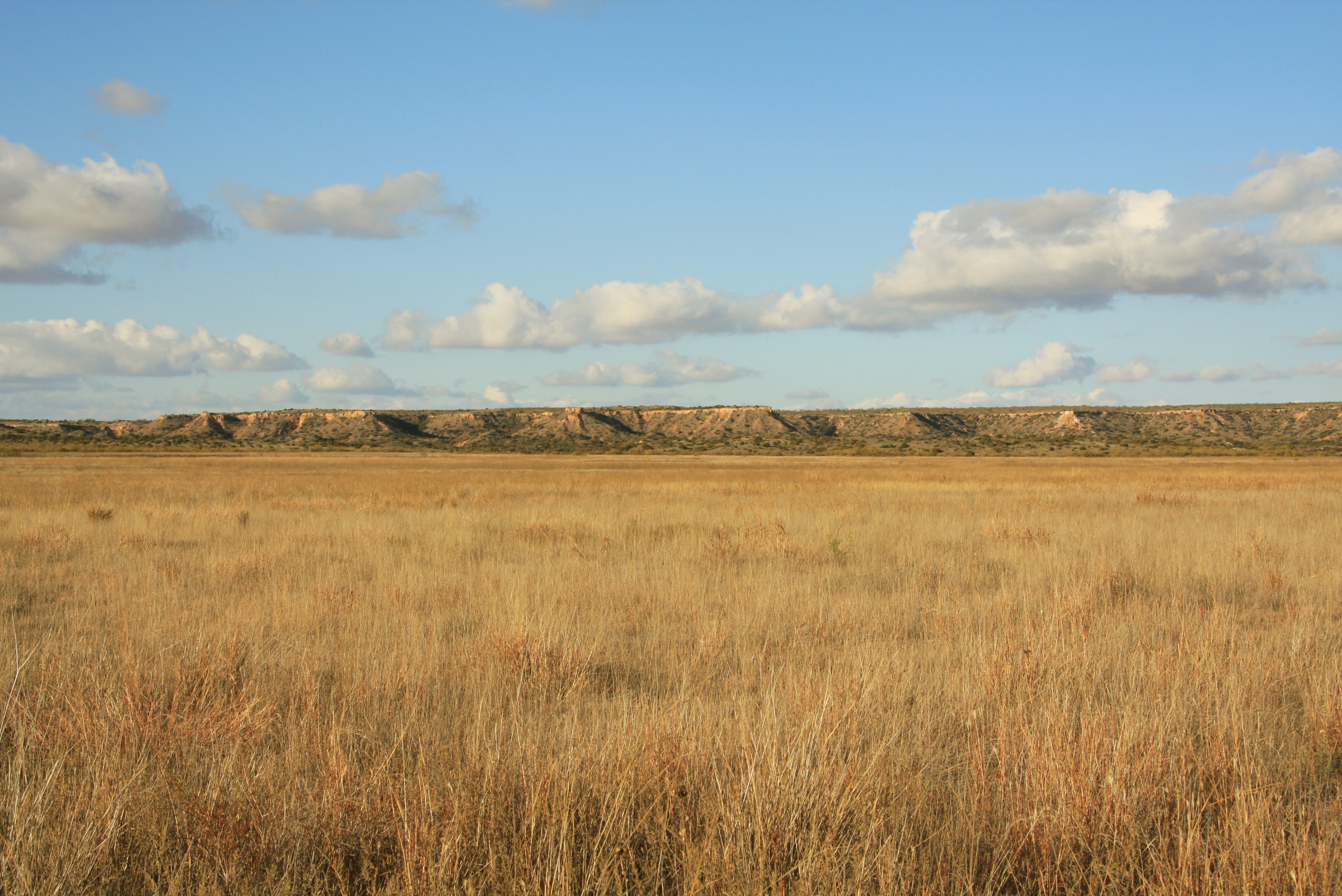
Southern plains of the Llano Estacado in the Texas Panhandle.

The Kiowa speak a language related to the Tanoan-speaking Pueblo peoples of New Mexico, despite the contrast between the Kiowa's nomadic lifestyle and the agricultural settlements of the Puebloans. The Kiowa-Tanoan languages have been suggested to originate in the Colorado Plateau, and the inferred northward movement of Kiowan ancestors has been connected to eastern elements of the Fremont culture through material and artistic motifs. This movement occurred was simultaneous with the southward migration of Athabaskan peoples into the Intermountain West, perhaps leading to the later relationship between the Kiowa and Plains Apache.

Oral tradition describes the Kiowa's formation as a distinct people in the northern Missouri River Basin, near today's Yellowstone National Park. Searching for more lands of their own, the Kiowa traveled southeast to the Black Hills in present-day South Dakota and Wyoming around 1650. In the Black Hills region, the Kiowa lived peacefully alongside the Crow people, with whom they long maintained a close friendship, organized themselves into 10 bands, and numbered around 3000. Pressure from the Ojibwe in the north woods and edge of the Great Plains in Minnesota forced the Cheyenne, Arapaho, and later the Sioux westward into Kiowa territory around the Black Hills. The Kiowa were pushed south by the invading Cheyenne who were then pushed westward out of the Black Hills by the Sioux. In their early history, the Kiowa traveled with dogs pulling their belongings until horses were obtained through trade and raid with the Spanish and other Indian nations in the southwest.

Eventually the Kiowa shared with the Comanche a vast territory called Comancheria, on the central and southern Great Plains in western Kansas, eastern Colorado, most of Oklahoma including the panhandle, and the Llano Estacado in the Texas Panhandle and eastern New Mexico. The close relationship of the two tribes began in the early spring of 1790 at the place that would become Las Vegas, New Mexico, a Kiowa party led by war leader Guikate, made an offer of peace to a Comanche party while both were visiting the home of a mutual friend of both tribes. This led to a later meeting between Guikate and the head chief of the Nokoni Comanche. The two groups made an alliance to share the same hunting grounds and entered into a mutual defense pact and became the dominant inhabitants of the Southern Plains. From that time on, the Comanche and Kiowa hunted, traveled, and made war together. In addition to the Comanche, the Kiowa formed a very close alliance with the Plains Apache (Kiowa-Apache), with the two nations sharing much of the same culture and participating in each other's annual council meetings and events. The strong alliance of southern plains nations kept the Spanish from gaining a strong colonial hold on the southern plains.

=== Indian wars ===
In closing years of the 18th century and in the first quarter of the 19th century, the Kiowa feared little from European neighbors. Kiowa ranged north of the Wichita Mountains. The Kiowa and Comanche controlled a vast expanse of territory from the Arkansas River to the Brazos River. The enemies of the Kiowa were usually the enemies of the Comanche. To the east there was warfare with the Osage and Pawnee.

In the early 19th, the Cheyenne and Arapaho began camping on the Arkansas River and new warfare broke out. In the south of the Kiowa and Comanche were Caddoan speakers, but the Kiowa and Comanche were friendly toward these bands. The Comanche were at war with the Apache of the Rio Grande region.

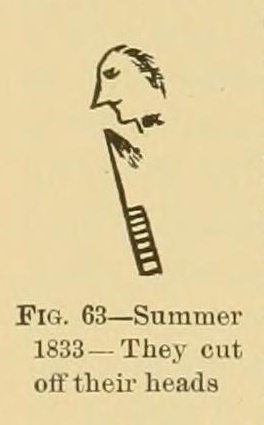
Cut-Throat Massacre, 1833. A picture from the Dohasan winter count.

They warred with the Cheyenne and Arapaho, Pawnee, Sac and Fox, and Osages.

In summer 1833, the Osage attacked an exposed Kiowa camp near Head Mountain, Oklahoma. The Kiowa lost many aged people, children and women. The heads were cut off and placed in kettles. During this "Cut-Throat Massacre", the Osage captured the sacred Tai-me (the Sun Dance figure of the Kiowa) as well. The Kiowa were unable to perform the Sun Dance until the return of the Tai-me in 1835. Dohasan replaced the old Kiowa chief, since he had failed to anticipate danger.

The Kiowa traded with the Wichita south along Red River and with Mescalero Apache and New Mexicans to the southwest. After 1840, they and their former enemies the Cheyenne, as well as their allies the Comanche and the Apache, fought and raided the Eastern natives moving into the Indian Territory.

From 1821 until 1870, the Kiowa joined the Comanche in raids, primarily to obtain livestock, that extended deep into Mexico and caused the death of thousands of people.

=== Colonial transition ===
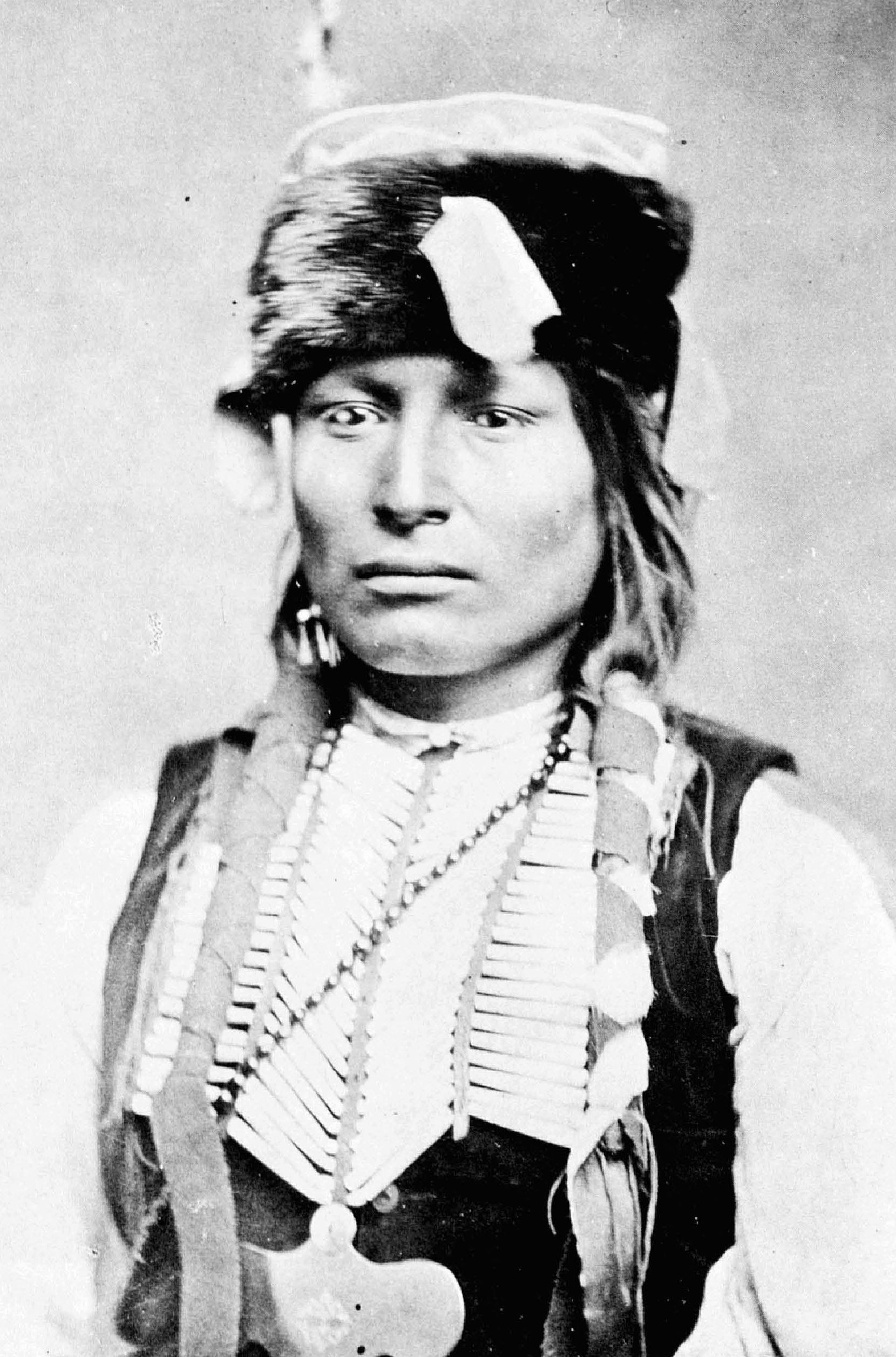
Mamay-day-te

The years from 1873 to 1878 marked a drastic change in Kiowa lifestyle. In June 1874, the Kiowa, along with a group of Comanche and Cheyenne warriors, made their last protest against the European invaders at the Battle of Adobe Walls in Texas, which proved futile. In 1877, the first homes were constructed for the Indian chiefs and a plan was initiated to employ Indians at the Agency. Thirty Indians were hired to form the first police force on the Reservation.

The Kiowa agreed to settle on a reservation in southwestern Oklahoma. Some bands of Kiowas remained at large until 1875. Some of the Lipan Apache and Mescalero Apache bands, with some Comanche in their company, held out in northern Mexico until the early 1880s, when Mexican and U.S. Army forces drove them onto reservations or into extinction. By the Treaty of Medicine Lodge in 1867, the Kiowas settled in Western Oklahoma and Kansas.

They were forced to move south of the Washita River to the Red River and Western Oklahoma with the Comanches and the Kiowa Apache Tribe. The transition from the free life of Plains people to a restricted life of the reservation was more difficult for some families than others.

=== Reservation period ===
The reservation period lasted from 1868 to 1906. In 1873, the first school among the Kiowa was established by Quaker Thomas C. Battey. In 1877, the federal government built the first homes for the Indian chiefs and initiated a plan to employ Indians. 30 Indians were hired to form the first police force on the reservation. In 1879, the agency was moved from Ft. Sill to Anadarko. The 1890 Census showed 1,598 Comanche at the Fort Sill reservation, which they shared with 1,140 Kiowa and 326 Kiowa Apache.

An agreement made with the Cherokee Commission signed by 456 adult male Kiowa, Comanche, and Kiowa Apache on Sept. 28, 1892, cleared the way for the opening of the country to European settlers. The agreement provided for an allotment of 160 acres (65 ha) to every individual in the tribes and for the sale of the reservation lands (2,488,893 acres or 1,007,219 ha) to the United States – was to go into effect immediately upon ratification by Congress, even though the Medicine Lodge treaty of 1867 had guaranteed Indian possession of the reservation until 1898. The Indian signers wanted their names stricken but it was too late. A'piatan, as the leader, went to Washington to protest. Chief Lone Wolf the Younger immediately filed proceedings against the act in the Supreme Court, but the Court decided against him in Lone Wolf v. Hitchcock (1903).

Agents were assigned to the Kiowa people.

=== Modern period ===
Since 1968, the Kiowa have been governed by the Kiowa Tribal Council, which presides over business related to health, education, and economic and industrial development programs.

On March 13, 1970, the Kiowa Indian Tribe of Oklahoma drafted its constitution and bylaws, and Kiowa voters ratified them on May 23, 1970. The current constitution was approved in 2017.

In 1998, in the landmark decision of Kiowa Tribe of Oklahoma v. Manufacturing Technologies, Inc., the U.S. Supreme Court ruled that Indian tribes retain their sovereign immunity as nations from private lawsuits without their consent, even in off-reservation transactions where they do not waive that immunity.

As of 2000, more than 4,000 of 12,500 enrolled Kiowa lived near the towns of Anadarko, Fort Cobb, and Carnegie, in Caddo and Kiowa counties, Oklahoma. Kiowa also reside in urban and suburban communities throughout the United States, having moved to areas with more jobs. Each year Kiowa veterans commemorate the warlike spirit of the 19th-century leaders with dances performed by the Kiowa Gourd Clan and Kiowa Black Leggings Warrior Society. Kiowa cultural identity and pride is apparent in their expressive culture and strong influence on the Gourd Dance and Southern Plains art.

== College ==
The tribe in February 2020 chartered Bacone College in Muskogee, Oklahoma as its tribal college. Kiowa Tribal Historian Phil “Joe Fish” Dupoint taught the Kiowa language online through the college.

== Notable Kiowas ==
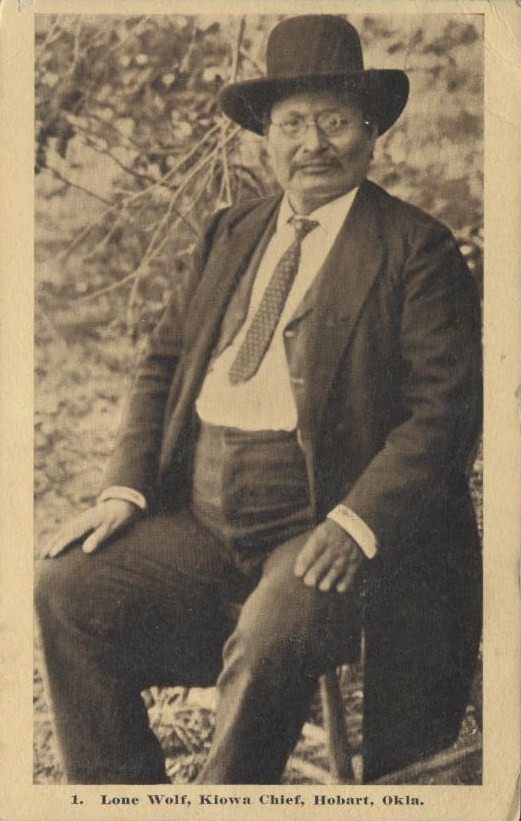
Lone Wolf, Kiowa chief, ca. 1907

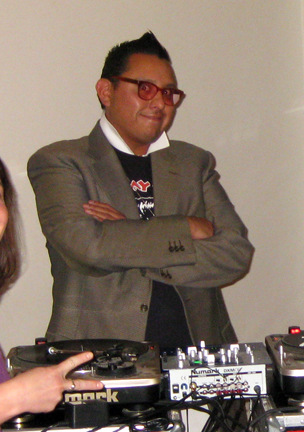
Micah Wesley, 2008, enrolled Kiowa artist and DJ

- Big Tree (Á:dàuiétd̶è) (c.1850–1929), war chief
- Ahpeahtone (Ábì:tauñ) (1856–1931), chief
- Richard Aitson (1953–2022), bead artist and poet
- Spencer Asah, painter, one of the Kiowa Six
- James Auchiah, painter, one of the Kiowa Six
- Big Bow (Zépg̶àuiètd̶è) (1833–c.1900), war chief
- Blackbear Bosin (Sétkóñ:gyái) (1921–1980), painter and sculptor
- T. C. Cannon, painter and printmaker
- Cozad Singers, drum group and NAMMY winners
- Jesse Ed Davis (1944–1988), Kiowa-Comanche guitarist
- Dohäsan (D̶ohausan) (c.1785–1866), chief of Kata band and Principal Chief of the Kiowas, artist, calendar keeper
- Teri Greeves (b. 1970), bead artist
- Sharron Ahtone Harjo (b. 1945), painter, ledger artist
- Jack Hokeah, painter, one of the Kiowa Six
- Beverly Horse (1931–2010), women's and Native rights administrator and activist
- Vanessa Paukeigope Jennings (b. 1952), bead artist, clothing and regalia maker
- Lois Smoky Kaulaity (1907–1981), beadwork artist and painter, one of the Kiowa Six
- Kicking Bird (T’è:néáungopd̶e) (1835–1875), war chief
- Guipago (G̶ûib̶à:gàui or Lone Wolf [the Elder]) (c.1820–1879) Principal Chief
- Mamanti (G̶áuñ:mâmáñ:d̶è or Mama'nte) (c. 1835–1875), medicine man
- Mamay-day-te (G̶ûib̶à:gàui or Lone Wolf [the Younger]) (c. 1843–1923) chief
- Tom Mauchahty-Ware, musician and dancer
- Parker McKenzie (Yí:sàum) (1897–1999), traditionalist and linguist
- Arvo Mikkanen, attorney
- N. Scott Momaday (Ts’òâitàlyì:) (1934–2024), Pulitzer Prize Winner, author, painter, and activist
- Stephen Mopope (1898–1974), painter, one of the Kiowa Six
- Horace Poolaw (Ƀâbò:) (1906–1984), photographer
- Pascal Poolaw (1922–1967), Native American war hero
- Red Warbonnet (D̶ángúl) (d. 1849), traditionalist
- Satanta (Set:t’aiñde) (c. 1815–1878), war chief
- Silver Horn (Háuñ:gùñ:) (1860–1940), artist and calendar keeper
- Sitting Bear (Sét:àñ:gyà, also called Set-Tank, Set-Angia, Satank) (c.1800–1871), warrior and medicine man
- Kendal Thompson, professional football player
- Monroe Tsatoke (Tsêñdòñk’ì:), painter, one of the Kiowa Six
- White Horse (Tsêñt’àiñ:dè) (d. 1892), chief
- Chris Wondolowski, U.S. professional soccer player
- Tahnee Ahtone (b. 1978), curator, artist, and dancer
- Lindy Waters III (b. 1997), professional NBA player
- Mirac Creepingbear (1947–1990), painter
- Sherman Chaddlesone (1947–2013), muralist, sculptor, and painter

== See also ==
- Gourd Dance
- Koitsenko, Kiowa warrior society
- Big Pasture, 1901 Kiowa, Comanche, and Apache grazing reserve
- Kiowa Peak (Texas)
