= Ahpeahtone =

Chief of the Kiowa tribe

- Ábì:tauñ
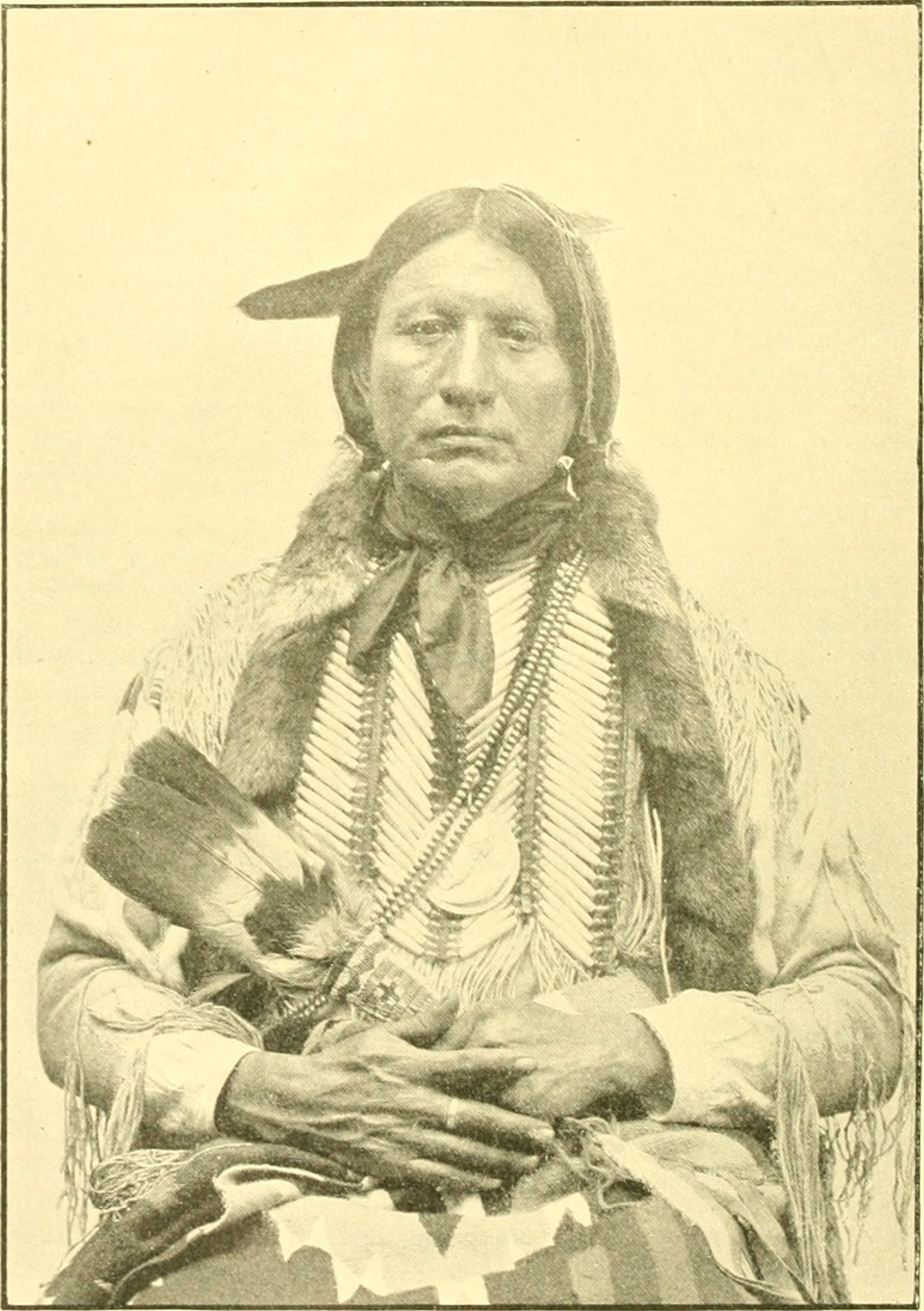
- Ahpeahtone in 1892

Kiowa leader

Personal details
- Born: c. 1856 Near Medicine Lodge, KS
- Died: August 8, 1931
- Resting place: Rainy Mountain Cemetery, south of Mountain View, OK
- Spouse(s): Kaubin, Guohaddle Ahpeatone
- Relations: Uncle, Lone Wolf (Guipahgah). Also related to Red Cloud.
- Children: 1
- Known for: Last traditional chief of the tribe
- Nickname(s): Que-Tah-Tsay, Apiatan

Ábì:tauñ or Ahpeahtone, also known as Que-Tah-Tsay (c. 1856 – August 8, 1931), was a chief of the Kiowa tribe in Oklahoma, who is regarded as the last traditional chief of the tribe.

== Background ==
Ahpeahtone was born in about 1856 near Medicine Lodge, Kansas, a favorite campsite of the Kiowa and site of the Medicine Lodge Treaty in 1867, where he was present as an 11 year old boy. Ahpeahtone was raised as his ancestors were, living free on the Great Plains of North America in tipi camps, hunting buffalo and other game and learning horsemanship and warrior skills. His Kiowa name, also spelled Apeahtone, Apiatan or Ah-pe-a-ton, means "Wooden Lance" or "Kills With a Lance". His lineage includes several noted Kiowa leaders and warriors. He was the son of the Kiowa leader Red Otter/Red Buffalo (Au Pau Goodle), an elite member of the Kiowa's 10 greatest warriors, the Koit-senk-gaw, and related by blood to Red Cloud, the Oglala Lakota war chief. Lone Wolf (Guipahgah), a prominent Kiowa chief was Ahpeahtone's paternal uncle. Lone Wolf (GuiPawGaw) and Red Buffalo were half brothers. Chief Ahpeahtone's parents were Red Buffalo (Au Pau Goodle) a full-blood Kiowa and Sioux Necklace Woman (Kale Pi Thay), who was half Kiowa and half Oglala Lakota. Kale Pi Thay's mother was "Walks as As She Thinks", a Kiowa taken captive as a teen by the Oglala Lakota when both tribes shared the Black Hills. Walks As She Thinks was raised speaking her native Kiowa language, but learned to speak Lakota after being taken captive. She later married a Brule Sioux/Lakota leader named Lone Man (Ishmaeitka) and had several children, among them was Chief Red Cloud, American Horse, and Fire Thunder, along with Kale Pi Thay. After Lone Man died in a battle and Walks as She Thinks was in mourning, a Kiowa man, Black Root (Ton Kon Ghi) was visiting the Oglala camp and became acquainted with Walks as She Thinks, a widow with four small children. She, being able to speak fluent Kiowa as well as Lakota, and now being a widow, Black Root (Ton Kon Ghi) soon fell in love with her and decided to take her as his wife and back to her Kiowa people. They both knew that taking the boys from the camp would result in a war between the Kiowa and the Oglala, so she left with Black Root under the cover of darkness one night to go back to her Kiowa people, taking with her the young Kale Pi Thay, and leaving behind young Red Cloud, American Horse and Fire Thunder to be raised by their uncle, the Oglala Chief Old Smoke. They walked and hid for many days to get all the way back to the Kiowa camp with Kale Pi Thay on her back, evading Oglala scouts who went to look for her. Many years later, Kale Pi Thay (Sioux Necklace Woman) went on to marry the Kiowa warrior Red Buffalo (Au Pau Goodle) and gave birth to many children, including Chief Ahpeahtone, his brother, Shorty Ahpeahtone (On Khon Say Hee) and his sister, Ton Haudle Mah (Lame Leg Woman; later Laura Doanmoe Pedrick), who was one of the first Kiowa to learn to speak English at the Carlisle Indian Industrial School in Pennsylvania and the first Kiowa to administer smallpox vaccinations at the Kiowa Comanche Apache Reservation in Oklahoma. She served as advisor and interpreter to her brother, Chief Ahpeahtone, during the turmoil and rapid lifestyle changes of the reservation years and the early statehood period of Oklahoma. Laura (Ton Haudle Mah) married Etadeleuh Doanmoe in 1883 while they were both students at Carlisle. Etadeleuh Doanmoe was one of the Kiowa prisoners taken to Fort Marion in Florida between 1875 and 1878, and later studied at Carlisle, starting in 1879, where he was a favorite student of Capt. Richard Henry Pratt, the Superintendent of Carlisle. Etadeleuh Doanmoe died in 1888 of tuberculosis, at the age of 32, and Laura went on to marry William Pedrick in 1894, who subsequently died in 1908, leaving Laura twice widowed at the age of 45 with two small children. Laura never remarried, but continued to serve her people and her brother Ahpeahtone, who died in 1931, and until her death in November of 1942.

== Leadership ==
Ahpeatone was highly respected for his decisions and leadership qualities.

In the spring of 1890, the Ghost Dance religion spread among the Plains Indians. This prophecy foretold the destruction of the European-Americans and a return of the old times and the buffalo. He was chosen by the Kiowa to visit Pine Ridge Agency in South Dakota. He was given a cordial welcome by his Lakota relatives, including Chief Red Cloud, who knew of the story of "Kale Pi Thay" and "Walks as She Thinks" and warmly welcomed him as a blood relative.

He also traveled to Fort Washakie, thinking he would find religion guidance among the northern Arapahoes. They sent him to the Paiutes in Nevada, where he found the alleged prophet, Wovoka, in the Mason Valley. When he returned home a great council was called to meet at Andarko and area tribes attended and Arapahoes were to present their side at the council. Ahpeahtone rose and spoke of his anxiety to know the truth. He related the story of his trip and feeling that the prophecy was a fraud. This greatly distressed the tribe and alienated some of them.

Ahpeahtone belonged to the Native American Church and used peyote as a sacrament. He belonged to the Gourd Dance Society and composed some of the songs. He composed other dance songs and participated in all the tribal dances. He was also a member of the Horse Headdress Society (Tsain Ton Maw), which declined in the 1880s.

Around 1916, he became a Methodist. He joined the Rainy Mountain Church in 1925, and became an active member.

In later years, Chief Ahpeahtone established the Kiowa Indian Hospital in Lawton, Oklahoma. During his years as chief, Ahpeahtone adopted a democratic system of tribal government and developed the idea of a committee to transact tribal business. He believed he earned enough to care for himself and his family and would not accept pay for his work on behalf of the tribe. The only gift he ever received from the Kiowa Tribe was a new Model-T Ford in 1927. It cost $550.

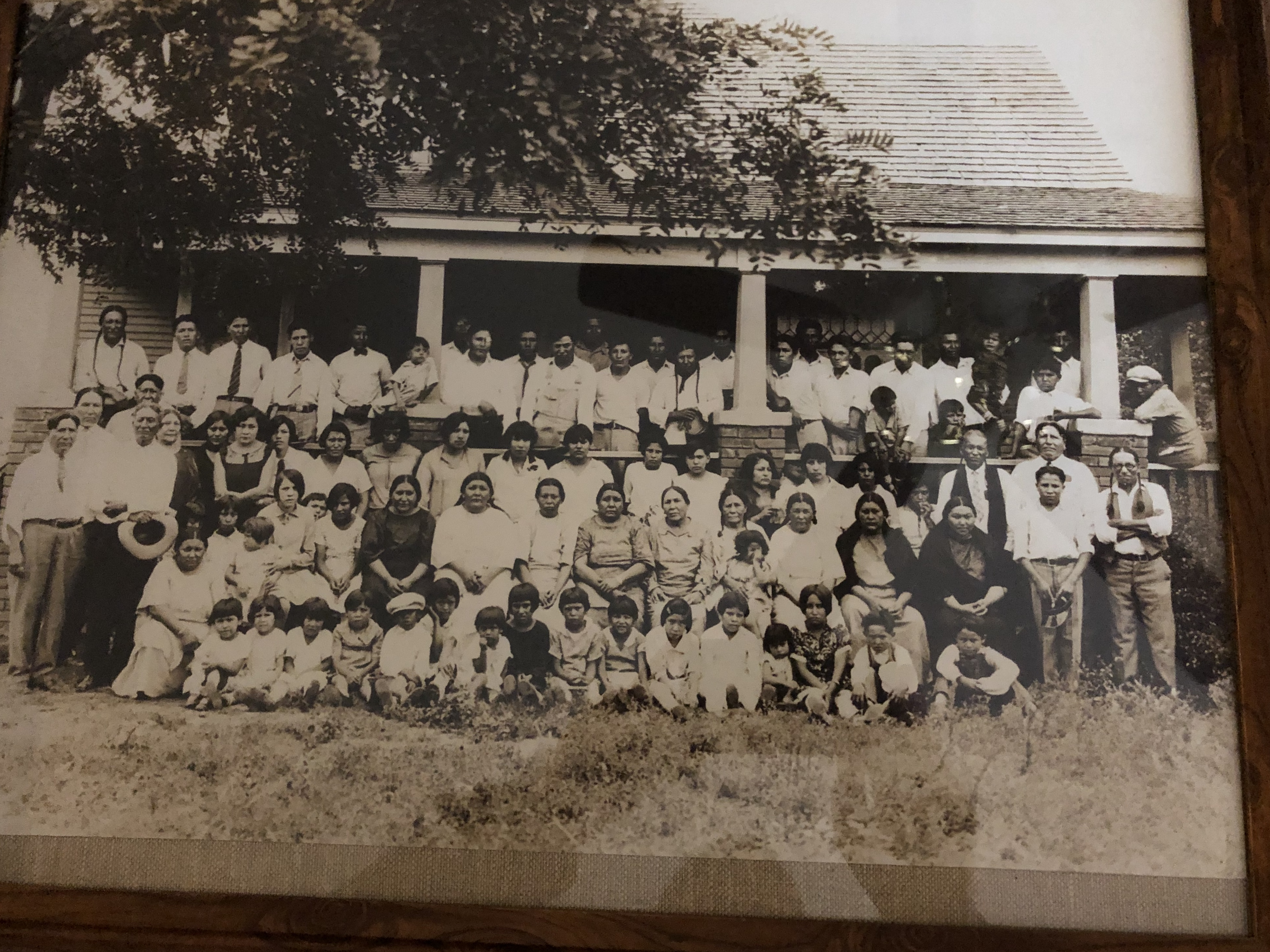
Ahpeahtone Family Reunion, Carnegie, OK. 1927,

== Family ==
Chief Ahpeatone and his family were land allottees. They farmed row crops and raised cattle and horses on their land southwest of Carnegie, Oklahoma.

== Death and legacy ==
Ahpeahtone died on 8 August 1931, and is buried at Rainy Mountain Cemetery south of Mountain View, OK.

In 1996, he was inducted into the National Hall of Fame for Famous American Indians in Anadarko and a bust was commissioned in his likeness.

The town of Ahpeatone, located in Cotton County, Oklahoma was named for the chief.
