= Richard Aitson =

Kiowa-Kiowa Apache bead artist and poet from Oklahoma

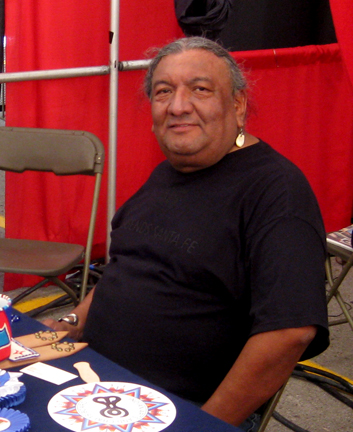
- Richard Aitson, 2008
- Born: Buffalo Rider; December 26, 1953 (age 72); Anadarko, Oklahoma, U.S.
- Citizenship: Kiowa Indian Tribe of Oklahoma, United States
- Education: Kimball Union Academy, Oberlin College, Institute of American Indian Arts
- Known for: Beadwork, poetry
- Movement: Kiowa art
- Awards: Red Earth Festival Grand Award, Jackie Autry Purchase Prize

Richard Aitson (born December 26, 1953) was a Kiowa- Ná'ishą Apache bead artist, curator, and poet from Oklahoma.

== Background ==
Richard Aitson was born on December 26, 1953, in Anadarko, Oklahoma. His mother was the Kiowa traditionalist Alecia Keahbone Gonzales (1926–2011), who taught the Kiowa language at the University of Science and Arts of Oklahoma. Aitson's Kiowa name means "Buffalo Rider." His family has had many artistic accomplishments and he comes five generations of respected beadworkers. Aitson attended the Kimball Union Academy in Meriden, New Hampshire; Oberlin College in Oberlin, Ohio; and the Institute of American Indian Arts in Santa Fe, New Mexico.

In 1976, Aitson produced documentaries for the Bicentennial Commission about Native American events. He worked at the Squash Blossom Gallery in Aspen, Colorado, in 1979, which is where he first curated art shows. He has since curated many group shows, including "Winter Camp 2000" at the National Cowboy and Western Heritage Museum in Oklahoma City. He taught Native American literature at Anadarko High School and also taught at Bacone College as an adjunct professor of art.

== Beadwork ==
Aitson jumped into beadworking out of necessity. He was invited to join the prestigious Kiowa Gourd Clan and had to learn beading to create his gourd dance regalia. Aitson describes his art as "contemporary-traditional" and he creates beaded dance regalia for the Native American community as well as bead art for fine art collectors and museums.

He is known in particular for his fully beaded, functional cradleboards, but he also makes miniature cradleboards with extremely minute beads. "I am touched by the art of the World War years and the Reservation Era because in my opinion, that is when the finest Kiowa beadwork was produced," he writes. "Quality beads and supplies were extremely scarce, yet remarkable and ingenious beadwork that bridged the ancient and the future was quietly created."

== Writing ==
Aitson writes poems inspired by traditional Kiowa oral history. His work, as Alan Velie writes, "combines the dream vision with animism to produce striking powerful imagery. He is inspired by Chilean poet Pablo Neruda.

== Exhibits and honors ==
In 1992, Aitson had a solo exhibition at the US Department of Interior's Southern Plains Indian Museum in Anadarko. His work has earned numerous awards, including the Red Earth Festival's Grand Award in 1997 and the Southwest Museum's Jackie Autry Purchase Prize in 2005. Many examples of his work are part of the permanent collection at the Sequoyah National Research Center in Little Rock, Arkansas.

== See also ==
- List of Native American artists
- Visual arts by indigenous peoples of the Americas
