= Horace Poolaw =

Kiowa photographer (1906-1984)

Photograph by Horace Poolaw: Lela Ware (Kiowa), Paul Zumwalt (Kiowa) and Trecil Poolaw (Kiowa), Mountain View, OK, 1928.

Horace Poolaw or Ƀâbò: (1906–1984) was a Kiowa photographer from Mountain View, Oklahoma.

== Background ==
Horace Monroe Poolaw, also known as Py-bo (Kiowa: Ƀâbò:), was born on March 13, 1906, in Mountain View, Oklahoma. Poolaw was a notable Kiowa photographer and one of the first professional Native American photographers of the early 20th century. Poolaw's father was Gui po-lau (Kiowa: Ǥûipòlâuđè), also known as Kiowa George, and his mother was Tsomah (Kiowa: Ts’óñ:mà:). The fifth of seven children, Poolaw was raised by a Kiowa family that was held in high esteem within the community, and his father was an important tribal historian. Poolaw had two apprenticeships with local photographers around age twelve and got his first camera at age fifteen. He did not make a living through his photography, but he did sell his photographs as inexpensive postcards while also doing a variety of odd jobs. In the mid-1920s, he married his first wife, Rhoda Redhord, and had a son, Jerry. In 1943, he enlisted in the U.S. Army Air Forces and served as an aerial photography instructor in Tampa Florida. He was honorably discharged in 1945. Shortly after, he moved to Anadarko, Oklahoma, with his second wife, Winne Chisholm, where they had three children: Robert, Linda, and Bryce. A car accident in 1957 left Poolaw unable to work, but he continued to make photographs until the 1970s, at which time his failing eyesight made doing so impossible. During the five decades in which he photographed the Kiowa People his primary subject, tribal cultures underwent profound changes, including the arrival of white settlers to the Plains, the division of tribal lands into farm allotments, and the disappearance of some traditional religious practices. He died in 1984.

== Career ==
Horace Poolaw was a photographer during times of great changes for Native Americans. He was able to document these changes from inside his Kiowa community. His photographs differ significantly from photographs of Native peoples by non-Native photographers, like Edward Curtis, which often stereotyped Native Americans as a "vanishing race," or as peoples unable to adapt to modernity and whose culture was doomed to disappear. In contrast, Poolaw depicted Native people's day-to-day life. Most of his early images are portraits of his family, friends, and Kiowa leaders.

Poolaw sold some of his photographs as postcards, which were purchased by both members of the Kiowa community and tourists. These postcards are most similar to representations of Kiowa people by non-Native photographers. They depict Native people in outdoor settings, wearing "traditional" clothing, and edit out overt signs of modernity. Even while Poolaw created romanticizing portraits of Native Americans, he was also aware of how photography had been used by non-Native photographers to perpetuate stereotypes about Native Americans, and a large number of his portraits challenge these stereotypes.

Poolaw's photographs of Indian fairs, which he took both as an official event photographer and as a visitor, show Native Americans as both part of contemporary America and as proud of their Native culture. One example is his portraits of Indian Princess in fair processions, in which his subjects, who are dressed in attire that celebrates their Native culture, are sitting on cars, in front of telephone wires, and by shops. Poolaw was also able to capture the impact of Native children being taken into American Indian boarding schools as a part of the U.S. federal Indian policy of assimilation. According to family members, Poolaw said he did not want to be remembered for his photography, but he wanted his photographs to help his people remember themselves.

=== His times ===
Poolaw created photographs during four distinct periods of policy change for Native Americans, specifically Assimilation, Reorganization, Termination, and Self Determination. He had a unique gift for recognizing historic events as they happened. Poolaw was born in the middle of the assimilation period of federal Indian policies and only six years after the policy of allotment began to be fully enforced in Kiowa communities under the Dawes Act. Allotment required tribal lands be divided into plots of land for individual families or sold off. Other assimilationist policies included the creation of government-run Indian boarding schools and the Religious Crimes Code of 1883. Assimilationist policy was driven by the idea that Native American culture and tribal ways would disappear as Native peoples integrated into settler culture. Poolaw's photographs disavowed and disprove these ideas, showing Native communities as vibrant and thriving.

With the implementation of the Indian Reorganization Act of 1934, federal policies began to support Indigenous self-government and cultural revitalization. These changes allowed Native peoples to perform their religion and dances openly, rather than in secret. By the 1930s peyotism and powwows were dominant forces in Kiowa life and belief. Tribal leaders were increasingly taking charge of Indian fairs, using them as opportunities for economic advancement and a place to openly perform and celebrate dances. Poolaw photographed many of these events. He attended many of these fairs in Oklahoma both as a spectator and as an official event photographer. Federal support for the promotion of traditional American Indian life and culture ended in the mid-1940s with the rise of federal politics of cultural "termination."

Indian termination policy tried to dissolve Native reservations, erode tribal lands, and facilitate the removal of all governmental power from Native tribes. Despite these policies, Poolaw's photographs continued to depict his community as strong and firmly rooted in Kiowa ways of life. The last decade of Poolaw's career was during the period of self-determination in federal Indian policy, which was a shift toward allowing tribal governments and sovereignty and away from forced assimilation. Poolaw captured how these changes in policy affected Native peoples through his photographs, documenting the complexities and continuities of Native identity.

== Legacy ==
Poolaw's photographic legacy – which his daughter, Linda arranged to have printed, catalogued and exhibited after his death in 1984-record this intersection of cultures and transformation of family life, work and leisure in images of engaging thoughtfulness and sensitivity. The exhibit, titled "War Bonnets, Tin Lizzies and Patent Leather Pumps: Kiowa Culture in Transition 1925-1955," traveled around the country in the early 1990s and was the subject of a major documentary video.

Together, Linda Poolaw and Charles Junkerman developed the year-long seminar as a special project. Students helped print all the negatives and research the individuals represented. They also assisted in the selection of a group of photographs for an exhibition at Stanford. Linda Poolaw and her students traveled to Anadarko, Oklahoma on three separate occasions to enlist the help of Kiowa elders who sifted through the photographs identifying people and events. The process of remembering brought the Kiowa generations together, as children were introduced to the photographs of deceased relatives, and younger people were confronted with images of their parents or grandparents.

After a lifetime of work Horace Poolaw wanted only that his people would be remembered for who they were. He documented the time in transformation to who the Kiowa were becoming. Poolaw captured a culture in transition, from a Native perspective.

=== Context: Photographic documentation of Native Americans ===
Other before-and-after matches are less dramatic but equally compelling, as in the case of two pictures of Apache children at the Carlisle Indian School in Pennsylvania in 1886. In the first, taken when they arrived, they are longhaired, barefoot and dressed in worn native clothes. In the second, shot a month later, they are trimmed, shod and wear school uniforms. The pictures were meant to demonstrate the transforming powers of civilization. They are also studies in cultural obliteration.

The assimilationist impulse took on missionary zeal in the careers of Frank C. Churchill (1850–1912), a United States Indian Agency employee, and his wife, Clara, both of whom photographed life on reservations. Mrs. Churchill gave slide lectures on Indians – a simulated version of one is in the show – in which she emphasized the progress they were making, how much they were just like us. But in a photo of Mrs. Churchill herself observing impoverished Apache women waiting in line for rations, the real us-them dynamic snaps into place.

Such jarring shifts in perspective recur everywhere in the show, which has been organized by Richard W. Hill Sr., a photographer and teacher at the State University of New York in Buffalo, and Natasha Bonilla-Martinez, director of education at the California Center for the Arts in Escondido. Just beyond the images of the aftermath of Wounded Knee are pictures, taken in the same year, of a pitched battle in progress between Indian warriors and white soldiers. This life-and-death skirmish, however, was being performed by actors in Buffalo Bill Cody's Wild West show, which toured the United States and Europe to popular acclaim.

Hollywood gave final form to the feathers-and-tomahawk version of the Indian – often enacted by Indians themselves – that is still current. At the same time, corrective views emerged. Some came from anthropologists like Frank G. Speck (1881–1950), a renowned scientist and a native rights advocate. Others came from American Indian photographers.

=== Spirit Capture Exhibit at the National Museum of the American Indian ===
Horace Poolaw (1906–1984) from Oklahoma, put together a body of work beginning in the 1920s. His pictures in the exhibition, included shots of Indian fairs and portraits of family and friends {{citation needed}}.

The exhibit Spirit Capture: Native Americans and the Photographic Image, that features Poolaw's work, showed at the National Museum of the American Indian, Smithsonian Institution, George Heye Center, in New York in 2002.

Spirit Capture is giving us another kind of experience, an expository history-book experience, one that might not have been as effective, or able to put across such difficult, layered information, in another form. Poolaw once said that he didn't want to be remembered for his photographs; he wanted his people to be remembered through them. Those are the priorities that seem to be operative in this exhibition, and, for the most part, at the National Museum of the American Indian itself.

=== For a Love of His People: The Photography of Horace Poolaw Exhibit at the National Museum of the American Indian ===
A more recent exhibit at the National Museum of the American Indian George Gustav Heye Center in New York City (on view August 9, 2014 – February 15, 2015) is organized around the theme of Horace Poolaw as a man of his community and his time. The exhibition features 81 black and white photographs and 10 period postcards, as well as Poolaw's 1940s Graflex Speed Graphic camera.

The catalog for the exhibition contains over 150 photographs by Poolaw and 16 essays by scholars, photographers, and family members.

== See also ==
- Parker McKenzie
