= Smoke flaps =

Ventilation device

Commercially, a smoke flap can take the form of a metal, tin, or other alloy and can be manipulatable by hand or lever, and appears in home chimneys, stoves or boilers. The more common use of a smoke flap is on the Native American Plains Indian tipi.

== Smoke flap vents ==
Smoke flap vents are designed to allow for adequate indoor heating especially where indoor fireplaces are present, as well as to regulate steam, smoke and heat pressure output in devices such as chimneys, stoves, or boilers.

== Tipi smoke flap vents ==
Smoke flap ventilation is used on tipi (teepee') housing of the Native America Plains Indians by tradition, both historically and on modern ceremonial tipis. The tipi smoke flap vent is attached in a continuous piece to the cured hides that cover the exterior of the large teepee housing structure. In the summer months the vent may remain open to a view of the night sky and to harmonize with the warm temperatures.

== Opening and closing the tipi flap vent ==
The tipi flaps are hoisted by the firekeeper with two poles to open or close the vent. In the daylight hours a tipi owner would hoist the vent open for additional lighting and also at the commencement of a newly built fire.
