= Tipi =

Type of Native American tent

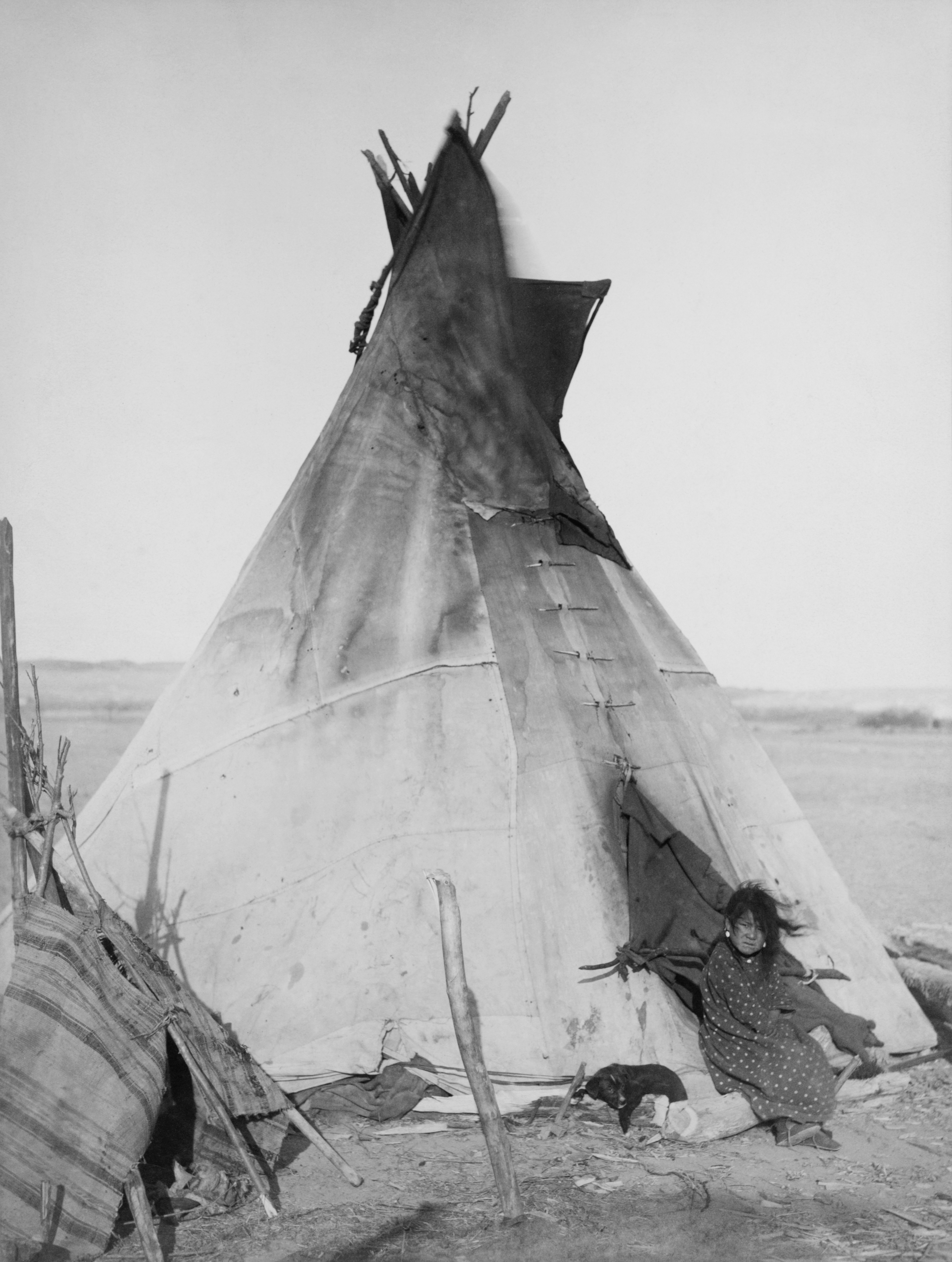
An Oglala Lakota tipi, 1891

A tipi or tepee (/ˈtiːpi/ TEE-pee) is a conical lodge tent that is distinguished from other conical tents by the smoke flaps at the top of the structure, and historically made of animal hides or pelts or, in more recent generations, of canvas stretched on a framework of wooden poles. The loanword came into English usage from the Dakota and Lakota languages.

Historically, the tipi has been used by certain Indigenous peoples of the Plains in the Great Plains and Canadian Prairies of North America, notably the seven tribes of the Sioux, as well as among the Iowa people, the Otoe and Pawnee, and among the Blackfeet, Crow, Assiniboines, Arapaho, and Plains Cree. They are also used west of the Rocky Mountains by Indigenous peoples of the Plateau such as the Yakama and the Cayuse. They are still in use in many of these communities, though now primarily for ceremonial purposes rather than daily living. Modern tipis usually have a canvas covering.

Non-Native people have often stereotypically associated all Native Americans in the United States and Indigenous peoples in Canada with tipis. This is inaccurate, as many Native American cultures and civilizations and First Nations from other regions have used other types of dwellings, such as pueblos, wigwams, hogans, chickees, and longhouses.

== Terminology and etymology ==
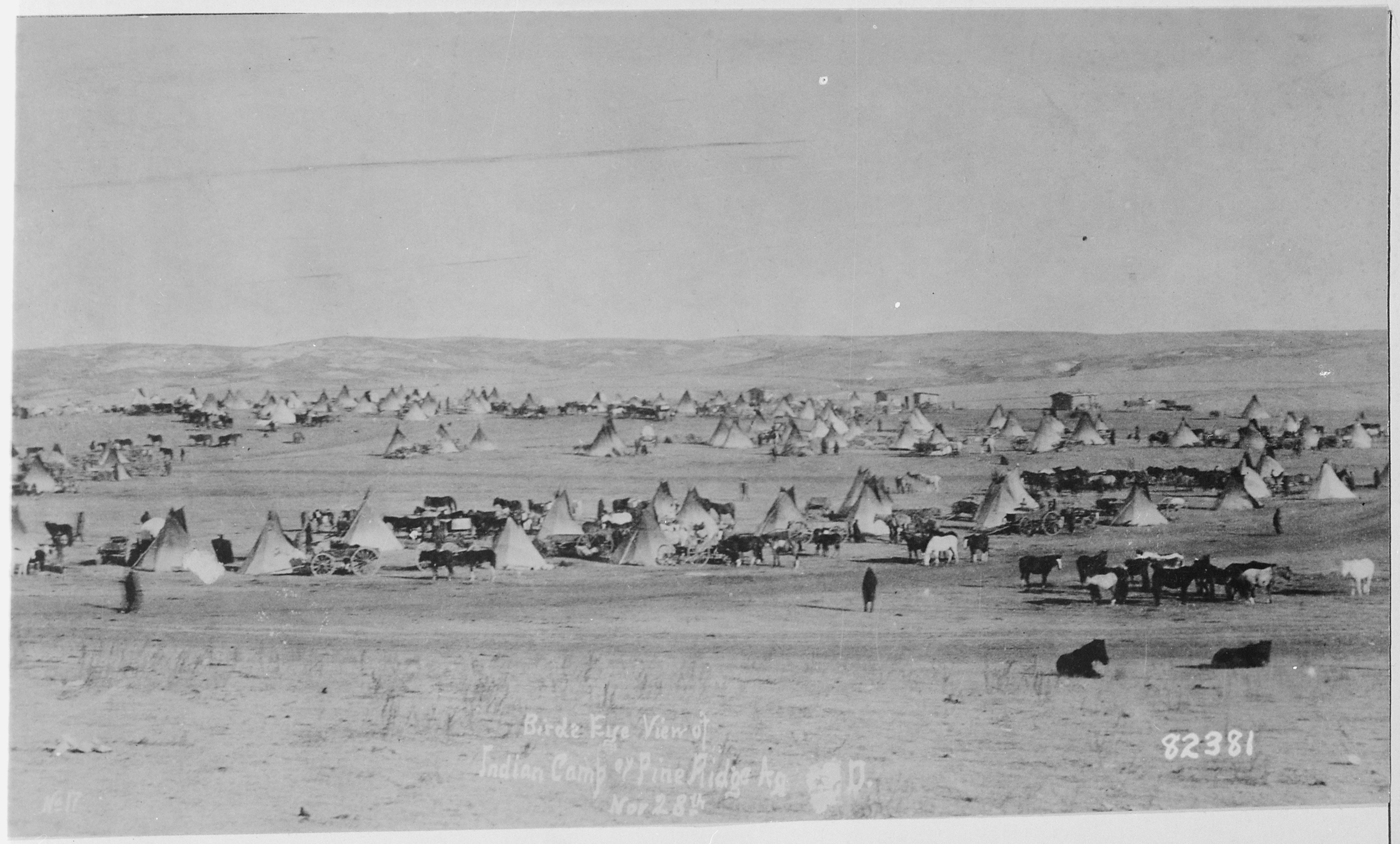
Example of typical tipi camp circle on the Pine Ridge Reservation, circa 1890

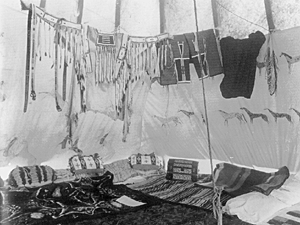
Crow lodge interior, 1907, showing the poles and outer skin at the top, the inner lining and bedding. The lashing rope is tied off to a wooden stake at the bottom of the photograph. Clothing is suspended on a line tied between two of the tipi poles.

Tipi is a loanword from the Dakota and Lakota language. Stephen Return Riggs' 1852 Dakota-English dictionary, which was sponsored by the Minnesota Historical Society spells it as tipi. Eugene Buechel spells it as tipi in his Lakota-English dictionary. Dakota ethnographer Ella Deloria used the spelling tipi throughout her writings, including in her essential book The Dakota Way of Life. Lakota linguist Albert White Hat developed his own Lakota orthography and used tipi as the spelling. The tipi image is used on almost all Dakota/Lakota tribal flags or seals, and tipi is the spelling used by Dakota and Lakota tribes today.

The spelling tipi is the one most common in Canadian English whereas the spelling tepee is the most common one according to American English dictionaries, the Encyclopaedia Britannica and the Columbia Electronic Encyclopedia.

The wigwam or "wickiup", a dome-shaped shelter typically made of bark layered on a pole structure, was also used by various tribes, especially for hunting camps. The term wigwam has often been incorrectly used to refer to a conical skin tipi. (Note: Usually wigwams are a domed structure; conical wooden wigwams exist, though, and presumably gave rise to the confusing of the different structures. For more, see: Notes on the Eastern Cree and Northern Saulteaux, Volumes 9-10. By Alanson Skinner. The Trustee, 1911. p12+13.)

The conventional translation in French and English for all Indigenous dwellings at one time was "lodge," resulting in many compounds and place names such as sweatlodge, lodgepole pine, Red Lodge, and so on.

== Types and utility ==
=== Structure ===
A tipi is distinguished from other conical tents by the smoke flaps at the top of the structure. The tipi is durable, provides warmth and comfort in winter, is cool in the heat of summer, (Note: With the sides raised; As seen in: Anthropological papers. 1917. p211) and is dry during heavy rains. Tipis can be disassembled and packed away quickly when people need to relocate and can be reconstructed quickly upon settling in a new area. (Note: Lewis H. Morgan notes the Dakota call their skin tents, "wii-ka-yo". The following is an extract of his text: "When first discovered the Dakotas lived in houses constructed with a frame of poles and covered with bark, each of which was large enough for several families. They dwelt principally in villages in their original area on the head-waters of the Mississippi, the present State of Minnesota. Forced upon the plains by an advancing white population, but after they had become possessed of horses, they invented a skin tent eminently adapted to their present nomadic condition. It is superior to any other in use among the American aborigines from its roominess, its portable character, and the facility with which it can be erected and struck. "[...]" When the tent is struck, the poles are attached to a horse, half on each side, like thills, secured to the horse's neck at one end, and the other dragging on the ground. The skin-covering and other camp-equipage are packed upon other horses and even upon their dogs, and are thus transported from place to place on the plains. This tent is so well adapted to their mode of life that it has spread far and wide among the Indian tribes of the prairie region." (Contributions to N. A. Ethnology, vol. iv., p. 114.)) Historically, this portability was important to Plains Indians with their at-times nomadic lifestyle. Tribes would have well-organized camp circles of family units living in multiple tipis arranged in order depending on rank or roles in the family unit, community, or ceremony. Generally, the door and camp openings face east in the direction of the sunrise.

A typical family tipi is a conical, portable structure with two adjustable smoke flaps, multiple poles (historically from 12 to 25 ft or 3.7 to 7.6 m long) called lodge poles.

Lewis H. Morgan noted that tipi frames were 13 to 15 poles that were 4.6 to 5.5 metres (15–18 ft) tall. These poles, "after being tied together at the small ends, are raised upright with a twist so as to cross the poles above the fastening." The builders pull the lower ends out to form a circle about 3.0 metres (10 ft) in diameter on the ground. They stretch a covering of tanned and untanned buffalo hides, sewn together, over the frame, which they then secure with stakes at the base. "At the top there is an extra skin adjusted as a collar, so as to be open on the windward side to facilitate the exit of the smoke. A low opening is left for a doorway, which is covered with an extra skin used as a drop. The fire-pit and arrangements for beds are the same as in the Ojibwa lodge, grass being used in the place of spruce or hemlock twigs."

Lodgepole pine is the preferred wood in the Northern and Central Plains and red cedar in the Southern Plains. Tipis have a detachable cover over the structure. The cover has historically been made of buffalo hide, an optional skin or cloth lining, and a canvas or bison calf skin door. Modern lodges are more often made of canvas.

Ropes (historically rawhide thongs or babiche) and wooden pegs are required to bind the poles, close the cover, attach the lining and door, and anchor the resulting structure to the ground. Tipis are distinguished from other tents by two crucial elements: the opening at the top and the smoke flaps, which allow the dwellers to heat themselves and cook with an open fire; and the lining that is primarily used in the winter, which insulates. Tipis were designed to be easily set up or taken down to allow camps to be moved to follow game migrations, especially the bison. When dismantled the tipi poles were used to construct a dog- or later horse-pulled travois on which additional poles and tipi cover were placed.

Tipi covers are made by sewing together strips of canvas or tanned hide and cutting out a semicircular shape from the resulting surface. Trimming this shape yields a door and the smoke flaps that allow the dwellers to control the chimney effect to expel smoke from their fires. Old-style traditional linings were hides, blankets, and rectangular pieces of cloth hanging about 1.2 to 1.5 metres (4–5 ft) above the ground tied to the poles or a rope.

=== Decoration ===
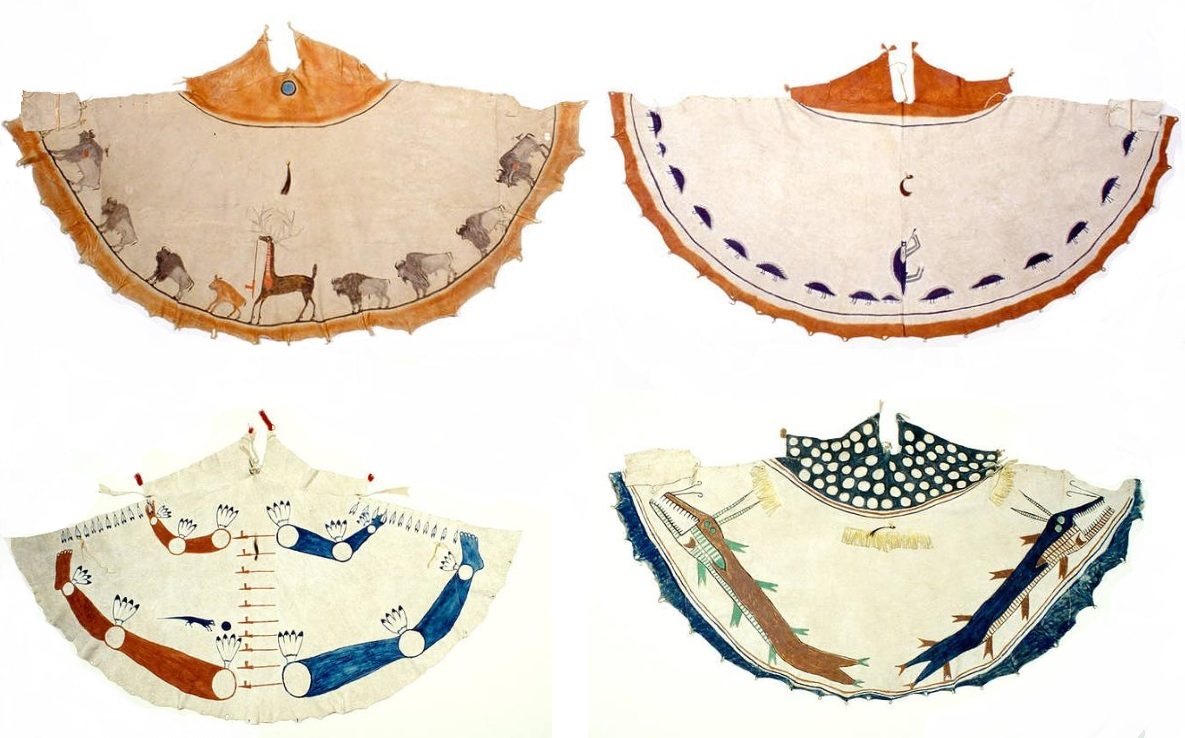
Four Kiowa tipis (1904) with designs. From top left to right: design featuring bison herd and pipe-smoking deer, porcupine design, design featuring arms and legs with pipes and lizard, and design featuring water monsters

Historically, most tipis in a village were not painted. Painted tipis often depicted noteworthy historical battles and often featured geometric portrayals of celestial bodies and animal designs. Sometimes tipis have been painted to depict personal experiences such as war, hunting, a dream, or vision. When depicting visions, "ceremonies and prayers were first offered, and then the dreamer recounted his dream to the priests and wise men of the community. Those known to be skilled painters were consulted, and the new design was made to fit anonymously within the traditional framework of the tribe's painted tipis."

During the later reservation era, retired warriors would paint on canvas tipis depicting different events in tribal history, including battles with Americans. He Nupa Wanica (Joseph No Two Horns), a Hunkpapa Lakota warrior who fought in 40 battles, including the Battle of the Little Bighorn, is one such artist known for his many tipi paintings, shields and horse effigies now in museums.

=== Teachings ===
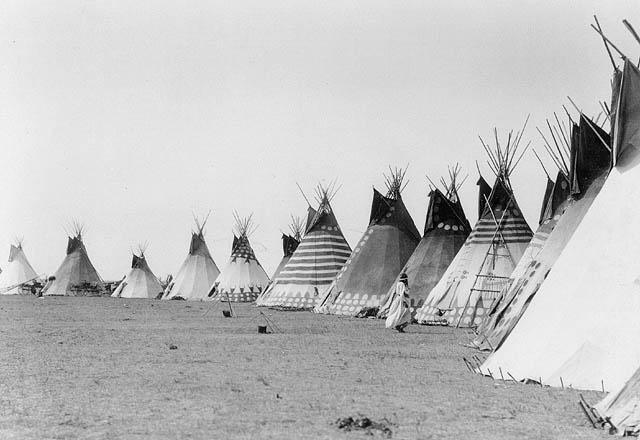
Examples of Siksika (Blackfoot) painted tipis, circa 1910

Tribes today use the tipi as a means to convey traditional, scientific, and psychological teachings. The Siksika (Blackfoot) nation's worldview is based on the shape of a tipi, which inspired Maslow's hierarchy of needs teachings. In Cree communities, the tipi can represent the power of women and their role as the foundation of the family unit. In Lakota communities, youth are taught how to assemble tipis, with each pole representing different traditional virtues, and are simultaneously taught geometry and teamwork.

== See also ==
- Chum (tent) – Type of temporary dwelling
- Goahti – Traditional, usually transportable building associated with the culture of Sami people
- Lavvu – Sámi temporary dwelling
- Plains hide painting – Artistic practice of Plains Indians
- Yurt – Portable, round tent covered with skins or felt
