= Amorous Man =

Mid-19th-century Comanche chief

The Amorous Man
- Pahayoko
- Born: late 1780s
- Died: after 1852
- Occupation: War Chief
- Known for: Comanche chief

Amorous Man (Comanche: Pahayoko,, lit. 'aunt copulate'; c. late 1780s – p. 1852) was a civil chief of the "Honey-Eaters" or Penateka band of the Comanche.

The height of his prominence was in the 1830s and 1840s.

== Early life ==
Nothing is known of his youth or early years. Amorous Man was a member of the same Comanche band, the "Honey-Eaters", as Buffalo Hump (Comanche: Potsʉnakwahipʉ), Yellow Wolf, and Santa Anna, although he was older than these other war chiefs. Although known as a civil, or peace, chief, he was known to lead war parties during the 1820s. He was an important chief during the 1830s and 1840s who had diplomatic relations with Anglo settlements in Texas, following the Council House Massacre.

== Name ==
His name is variously spelled Pahhauca, Pahayoko, Payayuca, Pahajoko, and Taqquanno, which is translated as "The Amorous Man" or more colorful descriptions.

== Councils and treaties ==
Amorous Man represented the Penateka division at the Camp Holmes Council in 1835, signing the treaty with Gen. M. Arbuckle and Sen. Monfort Stokes, along with chiefs such Tawaquenah ("Sun Eagle") of the Kotsoteka or "Buffalo-Eaters" band and Iron Jacket (Comanche: Puhihwikwasu'u or Pohowetowshah, lit. 'Metal Shirt' or 'Brass Man') of the Quahadi or "Antelope-Eaters" band of Comanche.

In 1838, Amorous Man went to Houston, where he, Mukwoorʉ (Spirit Talker), Mupitsukupʉ (Old Owl), and Potsʉnakwahipʉ (Buffalo Hump) met Texas President Sam Houston and signed a treaty. Like most Comanche chiefs, Amorous Man came to white attention following the Council House Massacre in 1840. But, if Old Owl was the first among the Comanche chiefs to recognize that defeating the whites was unlikely, Pahayoko was, probably, the second among the Penatekas: in 1843 he accepted to meet the Indian agent Daniel Watson and, in 1844, he attended the Tehuacana Creek Council, along with Mupitsukupʉ (Old Owl), Potsʉnakwahipʉ (Buffalo Hump), and other chiefs, not including Yellow Wolf and Santa Anna, but refused to sign the treaty. Nor was he part of the Meusebach-Comanche Treaty, signed by Mupitsukupʉ, Potsʉnakwahipʉ and Santa Anna.

Amorous Man, Mupitsukupʉ (Old Owl), Potsʉnakwahipʉ (Buffalo Hump), Yellow Wolf, Santa Anna, Ketumse, Tosahwi, and Asa-havey (Wolf's Road or Starry Road) signed the Tehuacana Treaty in April 1846, allowing the federal jurisdiction without getting any recognition of the borders of Comanche territory. Amorous Man was a signatory of the Butler-Lewis Treaty of 1846.

== Final years ==
After the cholera and smallpox epidemics of 1848 and 1849 reduced the Comanche population from approximately 20,000 to fewer than 12,000 within two years, Amorous Man went to settle as a permanent guest among the Kotsoteka, and later, in 1852, went to settle near the springs of the Big Wichita River with Potsʉnakwahipʉ, Ketumse and Shanaco. The date of his death is unknown.

== Bibliography ==
- Bial, Raymond. Lifeways: The Comanche. New York: Benchmark Books, 2000.
- Brice, Donaly E. The Great Comanche Raid: Boldest Indian Attack on the Texas Republic McGowan Book Co. 1987
- Fehrenbach, Theodore Reed The Comanches: The Destruction of a People. New York: Knopf, 1974, ISBN 0-394-48856-3. Later (2003) republished under the title The Comanches: The History of a People
- John, Elizabeth and A.H. Storms Brewed in Other Men's Worlds: The Confrontation of the Indian, Spanish, and French in the Southwest, 1540–1795. College Station, TX: Texas A&M Press, 1975.
- Kavanaugh, Thomas W. (1999). The Comanches: A History, 1706–1875. Lincoln: University of Nebraska Press. ISBN 978-0803277922.
- Lodge, Sally. Native American People: The Comanche. Vero Beach, Florida 32964: Rourke Publications, Inc., 1992.
- Lund, Bill. Native Peoples: The Comanche Indians. Mankato, Minnesota: Bridgestone Books, 1997.
- Mooney, Martin. The Junior Library of American Indians: The Comanche Indians. New York: Chelsea House Publishers, 1993.
- Native Americans: Comanche (August 13, 2005).
- Richardson, Rupert N. The Comanche Barrier to South Plains Settlement: A Century and a Half of Savage Resistance to the Advancing White Frontier. Glendale, CA: Arthur H. Clark Company, 1933.
- Rollings, Willard. Indians of North America: The Comanche. New York: Chelsea House Publishers, 1989.
- Secoy, Frank. Changing Military Patterns on the Great Plains. Monograph of the American Ethnological Society, No. 21. Locust Valley, NY: J. J. Augustin, 1953.
- Schilz, Jodye Lynn Dickson and Thomas F.Schilz. Buffalo Hump and the Penateka Comanches, El Paso: Texas Western Press, 1989.
- Streissguth, Thomas. Indigenous Peoples of North America: The Comanche. San Diego: Lucent Books Incorporation, 2000.
- Wallace, Ernest, and E. Adamson Hoebel. The Comanches: Lords of the Southern Plains. Norman: University of Oklahoma Press, 1952.
