= Yellow Wolf (Comanche) =

Comanche war chief (c.1800-1854)

Yellow Wolf (Comanche: Isa-viah, spelled also “Sa-viah” and sometimes misspelled as “Sabaheit”, “Little Wolf”; born c. 1800 or 1805 — died 1854) was a War Chief of the Penateka division of the Comanche Indians. He came to prominence after the Council House Fight, when Buffalo Hump called the Comanches and, along with Yellow Wolf and Santa Anna, led them in the Great Raid of 1840. He was Spirit Talker (Mukwooru)'s nephew and Buffalo Hump (Potsʉnakwahipʉ "Buffalo Bull's Back")'s cousin and best support.

== Early life ==
Yellow Wolf's youthful life and warrior training, as well as Buffalo Hump's, went likely under their uncle Mukwooru’s, chief and shaman of the Penateka people, guidance. In 1829 both the young war chiefs, Buffalo Hump and his partner and alter-ego Yellow Wolf, went northward after a Cheyenne raiding party to recover a stolen big herd of Comanche horses and fight the Cheyenne warriors, as their more northern kinsmen Yamparika, Kotsoteka, Nokoni and Kwahadi warriors too were accustomed to do under their leaders like Ten Bears, Tawaquenah (“Big Eagle” or “Sun Eagle”), Wulea-boo (“Shaved Head”), Huupi-pahati (“Tall Tree”), Iron Jacket, and also their allies the Kiowa, fighting in the Arkansas River country against their Cheyenne and Arapaho foes. The Penateka party raided a Cheyenne encampment near the Bijou Creek, north of Bent's Corral, (Huerfano River) and stole the entire horse herd, but, while going back to the Comanche villages, the famous Cheyenne chief Yellow Wolf pursued them with about twenty Cheyenne warriors; Yellow Wolf (the Cheyenne) didn't engage the Penateka party, too near the Comanche encampments, but his Cheyenne raiders stole again the herd, taking advantage of their rifles to keep away the Comanche pursuers. In 1829 Yellow Wolf and Buffalo Hump led an expedition to raid the settlements in the Guadalupe valley, messing up Mukwooru and Incoroy's to stipulate a peace agreement with the Mexicans, but conquering a fame as raiders among the Mexican people. In 1835 both the cousins, Yellow Wolf and Buffalo Hump, led 300 Comanche warriors in an attack against Parral, in the Sierra Madre occidental (Chihuahua). Buffalo Hump, Yellow Wolf and Santa Anna were by then the most important war leaders of the Penateka Comanches, and in 1838, when Buffalo Hump accompanied the peace chiefs Mukwooru, Amorous Man, and Old Owl to meet Texan President Sam Houston in Houston city, where they subscribed a treaty; Yellow Wolf and Santa Anna remained in charge of the warriors, to ensure the security of the delegation, and everyway the leadership of the warriors, in case of treachery. When, in December 1838, Mirabeau Lamar, a partisan of the clash with the Indians and of their expulsion from Texas, succeeded Houston, fighting went on.

== The Council House Fight ==
In March 1840, under Lamar's Presidency, the Comanche chiefs agreed to a meeting in the Council House at San Antonio in Texas with the intention to negotiate a peace treaty with the Republic of Texas. A Comanche delegation (65 people, with a dozen chiefs of several bands and several women too), led by Mukwooru and Kwihnai ("Eagle") came under a white flag of truce as they understood ambassadors should do. The Texans had expected the Comanches to bring several white captives as part of the agreement, but the chiefs explained they had brought the one only captive they had (16-year-old Mathilda Lockhart). The Texans did not understand the chiefs had no power over the other bands to force them to comply with the demands, and pulled out guns telling the Indians they were now their prisoners until the rest of the white captives were returned. The Comanches, who had entered the Council House without bows, lances or guns, fought back with their knives, but The Texans had concealed their soldiers just outside the Council House. At the onset of the fighting, the windows and doors were opened and the soldiers outside shot into the room through the Comanches: 35 Comanches (among them all the chiefs, three women and two children) were slain and 29 were captured; seven Texans were killed too; Mukwooru's widow was sent back to her people to warn them that, unless all the white prisoners kept by the Comanches would be relinquished, the Comanche prisoners at San Antonio would be killed. This betrayal marked permanently as treacherous people the Texans in the eyes of the Comanche people, who felt their unarmed ambassadors had come in under a white flag of truce and, despite this, had been slaughtered. Isimanica lined up 300 warriors in front of San Antonio, challenging the Texan militia, locked-up in San Josè Mission, to come out and fight, but the Texans did not oblige. After this, Piava, a minor chief, brought to San Antonio three white prisoners, but probably the Comanches killed the others. Amorous Man and Old Owl became the Penateka principal chiefs, with Buffalo Hump as the principal war chief and Yellow Wolf and Santa Anna as his lieutenants and partners.

== The Great Raid of 1840 ==
In the summer Buffalo Hump called a council; spreading word to the other bands of Comanches that he, Yellow Wolf and Santa Anna were going for a great raid against the white settlements in Texas as a revenge; in the meanwhile, Buffalo Hump, Yellow Wolf, Santa Anna and Isimanica, with 400 warriors, were raiding the settlements between Bastrop and San Antonio, exhausting the Rangers and Militia's detachments. When they were ready, in late July 1840, Old Owl too joined the biggest war party. According to the Comanche tradition, all the principal Comanche chiefs took part in the Great Raid: if so, also Ten Bears, Tawaquenah, Wulea-boo (“Shaved Head”), Huupi-pahati, Iron Jacket, and possibly their allies the Kiowa, like Dohasan and Satank, could have had a role. On this raid the Comanches went all the way from the plains of west Texas to the cities of Victoria and Linnville on the Texas coast. Linnville was the second largest port in Texas at that time. In what may have been the largest organized raid by the Comanches to that point, they raided, burned, and plundered these towns. The Comanches killed a large number of slaves and captured more than 1,500 horses.

== The Battle of Plum Creek ==
On the way back from the sea, the Comanches easily defeated three different Militia detachments under John Tomlinson, Adam Zumvalt and Ben McCulloch (all together, 125 men) near the Garcitas Creek; then, overwhelmed another Militia company (90 men) led by Lafayette Ward, James Bird and Matthew Caldwell along the trail to the San Marcos River; Texan forces were rallied under gen. Felix Huston: finally, mustered all the Rangers companies of central and western Texas, under Jack Hays and Ben McCulloch, and Texian militia from Bastrop and Gonzales, respectively under Ed Burleson and Mathew Caldwell, they were attacked by Texas Rangers and Militia at the Battle of Plum Creek near Lockhart. The Indians got away with a great many of the stolen horses and most of their plunder. Volunteers from Gonzales had gathered to attempt to stop the war party and together with all the ranger companies of east and central Texas, moved to intercept the Indians, which they did at Plum Creek, near the city of Lockhart on August 12, 1840. 80 Comanches were reported killed in the running gun battle (although only 12 bodies were recovered), unusually heavy casualties for the Indians, although they got away with the bulk of their plunder and stolen horses. The “defeated Comanches”, on their side, did value this fight as a such great victory to enhance the chiefs’ prestige.

== The borders of “Comancheria” in Texas ==
In January–February 1841 Yellow Wolf led 80 warriors to the western outskirts of San Antonio, killing two Mexicans and a black sheepherder and then attacking a wagon train of Irish immigrants and catching their cattle; a Texas Rangers party (17 Rangers and two Lipan scouts) under John Coffee Hays reached them while coming back to the Comanche encampments between the Guadalupe and the Colorado Rivers. In the fight, near Pinta Trail Crossing on the Guadalupe River, the Comanches were reported to suffer 23 dead, 13 deadly wounded and 24 wounded, largely due to the superior weaponry of the Rangers’ Paterson Colts and one Colt revolving-wheel rifle, and Yellow Wolf too was rather seriously wounded; the Rangers suffered only several wounded. Resettled Houston as president, in August 1843 the Comanches and Kiowas made a truce agreement with Texas and, in October, the Comanches – Penateka, but also Nokoni, Kotsoteka and Kwahadi - interested in fixing the Comancheria borders, agreed to meet the Texan President and discuss a peace treaty similar to the one made with the Wichitas and the Indians removed from the East in the same 1843 at Fort Bird. Buffalo Hump (demonstrating his faith in Houston), the peace chiefs Amorous Man, Old Owl and others, the Kiowas and Katakas (“Kiowa Apahes”) and the Wichitas (Kanoatino, Waco, Taweash, Tawakoni, Keechi) agreed to free their white prisoners and signed the Treaty of Tehuacana Creek in October 1844, but Yellow Wolf and Santa Anna (believing perhaps in Houston, but not in the Texans) refused to sign. When, in ratifying the Tehuacana treaty, the Senate of Texas Republic erased the reference to the Comancheria borders, the Texan bad faith and Yellow Wolf and Santa Anna's suspicions were confirmed, so Buffalo Hump aligned with his cousin, who had proved himself to have been more realistic than the major leader in evaluating the white man's concern for a fair and lasting peace, and the third war chief, and denounced the Tehuacana treaty and resumed hostilities. Annexed Texas to the United States, in May 1846 Buffalo Hump, Yellow Wolf and Santa Anna, aware they weren't strong enough to oppose U.S.A. nor stop the ceaseless and massive flow of the immigrants, agreed to meet the U.S. delegates at Council Springs and signed a new treaty; Buffalo Hump declined an invitation to go to Washington and meet President James Polk, and joined Yellow Wolf in a great raiding party going to Mexico. In 1847 Yellow Wolf apparently didn't take part in the San Saba River council, when some Penateka chiefs (Old Owl, Buffalo Hump, Santa Anna) met the Indian agent Robert S. Neighbors, Johann O. von Meusebach and the German immigrants united in the “Adelsverein” and authorized them to settle Fredicksburg, in the grant they had bought between the Llano and the Guadalupe rivers. Still in May 1847 Amorous Man, Old Owl, Buffalo Hump, and Santa Anna met again Neighbors only to apprehend that U.S. Senate had suppressed the article of Council Springs treaty forbidding the white people to encroach in the Comanche territory: among their useless protests by the chiefs, Santa Anna claimed the right to raid into Mexico, and since the United States was at war with Mexico, Neighbors raised no objections, so Buffalo Hump, Yellow Wolf and Santa Anna led some hundreds of warriors into Coahuila and Chihuahua, burning villages, stealing horses and kidnapping women and children all the way to San Francisco del Oro during the summer; coming back, the Comanches were engaged by U.S. Dragoons near Parras, losing part of the booty; in August Yellow Wolf, Buffalo Hump, and Santa Anna were in Mexico again leading 800 warriors. During the latest years 1840s and the subsequent 1850s Yellow Wolf too, as Buffalo Hump, dealt almost peacefully with U.S. representatives and agents, and in 1849 he and Shanaco (son of a chief killed in the Council House of San Antonio) joined Buffalo Hump in the first part of the trail, as far as the Nokoni villages, to escort Robert S. Neighbors’ and John S. “Rip” Ford's expedition from San Antonio to El Paso; there, Yellow Wolf and Buffalo Hump entrusted their protegés to their old friend Huupi-pahati, the Nokoni chief, who brought the whites to their destination. White men encroaching in “Comancheria” provoked clashes and, on November 16, 1850, Yellow Wolf led 100 Comanches to raid a wagon train at Cherry Spring, fourteen miles northwest of Fredericksburg: four teamsters were killed and three wounded. On December 10, 1850, anyway, Yellow Wolf joined Buffalo Hump in signing the Fort Martin Scott treaty. In 1851 Yellow Wolf and Buffalo Hump, again together in the field, led their warriors in a great raid into Mexico, raiding the states of Chihuahua and Durango.

== End of the Penateka freedom ==
In September 1853 Yellow Wolf, Ketumse and Shanaco met Neighbors, appointed again as Indian agent, and asked the promised annuities (at first food and clothing) to be sent to the Comanche reservation and measures against the white squatters to be adopted; Neighbors, who did not have the authority to content them and knew the stubborn will of Texan Congress to take possession of the Indian country by promoting the claims of the white settlers and pursuing the removal of the Indian Nations, went on in his pressing in favor of an Indian reserves system, and the Secretary of War Jefferson Davis suggested to buy part of the lands assigned by Government to the removed Choctaw in western Oklahoma; Neighbors suggested instead to settle two small reserves on the Brazos River. In the 1854 summer, Neighbors and Capt. Randolph B. Marcy carried out a reconnaissance and located two areas, allocating to the Penatekas 18.576 acres on the Brazos Clear Fork, approximately five miles from Camp Cooper. In November Neighbors went to the Penateka winter camp and persuaded Buffalo Hump and the far more malleable Shanaco, Ketumse, and Asa-havey to go and settle in the reserve, but Yellow Wolf, who was still pressing for the recognition of a border between Texas and Comancheria, left the council, flatly refusing to go. One week later Yellow Wolf was killed by a party of Lipan hunters. After Yellow Wolf's killing in the summer 1854, Buffalo Hump temporized almost two years more, but in 1856 finally led his Penatekas to the Brazos and, despite his misgivings, settled on the reserve.

== See also ==
- Texas–Indian wars
- John Coffee Hays, admired by Chief Buffalo Hump

== Bibliography ==
- Wallace, Ernest & Hoebel, E. Adamson The Comanche: Lords of the Southern Plains, University of Oklahoma Press, Norman, 1952
- Schilz, Jodye Lynn Dickson & Schilz, Thomas F. Buffalo Hump and the Penateka Comanches, Texas Western Press, El Paso, 1989
- Nye, Wilbur Sturtevant. Carbine and Lance: The Story of Old Fort Sill, University of Oklahoma Press, Norman, 1983
- Leckie, William H. The Buffalo Soldiers: A Narrative of the Negro Cavalry in the West, University of Oklahoma Press, Norman, 1967
- Fowler, Arlen L. The Black Infantry in the West, 1869-1891, University of Oklahoma Press, Norman, 1996
- Brown, Dee. Bury My Heart at Wounded Knee: An Indian History of the American West, Holt, Rinehart & Winston, New York, 1970
- Bial, Raymond. Lifeways: The Comanche. New York: Benchmark Books, 2000.
- Brice, Donaly E. The Great Comanche Raid: Boldest Indian Attack on the Texas Republic McGowan Book Co. 1987
- "Comanche" Skyhawks Native American Dedication (August 15, 2005)
- Brown, Dee. Bury My Heart at Wounded Knee: An Indian History of the American West, Holt, Rinehart & Winston, New York, 1970
- Chalafant, William J. Without Quarter: the Wichita Expedition and the fight on Crooked Creek, University of Oklahoma Press, Norman, 1991
- Dunnegan, Ted. Ted's Arrowheads and Artifacts from the Comancheria (August 19, 2005)
- Fehrenbach, Theodore Reed The Comanches: The Destruction of a People. New York: Knopf, 1974, ISBN 0-394-48856-3. Later (2003) republished under the title The Comanches: The History of a People
- Foster, Morris. Being Comanche.
- Fowler, Arlen L. The Black Infantry in the West, 1869-1891, University of Oklahoma Press, Norman, 1996
- Frazier, Ian. Great Plains. New York: Farrar, Straus, and Giroux, 1989.
- Hagan, William T. Quanah Parker, Comanche Chief, University of Oklahoma Press, Norman, 1976
- Haley, James L. The Buffalo War: the History of the Red River Indians Uprising of 1874, University of Oklahoma Press, Norman, 1976
- John, Elizabeth and Storms, A.H. Brewed in Other Men's Worlds: The Confrontation of the Indian, Spanish, and French in the Southwest, 1540–1795. College Station, TX: Texas A&M Press, 1975.
- Jones, David E. Sanapia: Comanche Medicine Woman. New York: Holt, Rinehart and Winston, 1974.
- Leckie, William H. The Buffalo Soldiers: A Narrative of the Negro Cavalry in the West, University of Oklahoma Press, Norman, 1967
- Lodge, Sally. Native American People: The Comanche. Vero Beach, Florida 32964: Rourke Publications, Inc., 1992.
- Lund, Bill. Native Peoples: The Comanche Indians. Mankato, Minnesota: Bridgestone Books, 1997.
- Mooney, Martin. The Junior Library of American Indians: The Comanche Indians. New York: Chelsea House Publishers, 1993.
- Newcomb, William W. Jr. The Indians of Texas: from Prehistorics to Modern Times, University of Texas Press, Austin, 1972
- Nye, Wilbur Sturtevant. Carbine and Lance: The Story of Old Fort Sill, University of Oklahoma Press, Norman, 1983
- Native Americans: Comanche (August 13, 2005).
- Richardson, Rupert N. The Comanche Barrier to South Plains Settlement: A Century and a Half of Savage Resistance to the Advancing White Frontier. Glendale, CA: Arthur H. Clark Company, 1933.
- Rollings, Willard. Indians of North America: The Comanche. New York: Chelsea House Publishers, 1989.
- Secoy, Frank. Changing Military Patterns on the Great Plains. Monograph of the American Ethnological Society, No. 21. Locust Valley, NY: J. J. Augustin, 1953.
- Schilz, Jodye Lynn Dickson and Schilz, Thomas F. Buffalo Hump and the Penateka Comanches, Texas Western Press, El Paso, 1989
- Streissguth, Thomas. Indigenous Peoples of North America: The Comanche. San Diego: Lucent Books Incorporation, 2000.
- "The Texas Comanches" on Texas Indians (August 14, 2005).
- Wallace, Ernest, and Hoebel, E. Adamson The Comanche: Lords of the Southern Plains, University of Oklahoma Press, Norman, 1952.
- Webb, Walter Prescott The Texas Rangers: a Century of Frontier Defense, University of Texas Press, Austin, 1983
- "Comanche" on the History Channel (August 26, 2005)
