= Buffalo Hump =

Comanche war chief (c.1800-c.1867)

Buffalo Hump Potsʉnakwahipʉ
- Born: c. 1800; Edwards Plateau, Texas
- Died: c. 1870; Fort Cobb, Oklahoma
- Occupation: Medicine Man
- Known for: Comanche war chief

Buffalo Hump (Comanche: Potsʉnakwahipʉ, transl. "Erection That Won't Go Down" euphemized to "Buffalo Bull's Back") (born c. 1800 — died post 1861 / ante 1867) was a War Chief of the Penateka band of the Comanches. He came to prominence after the Council House Fight when he led the Comanches on the Great Raid of 1840.

== Early life ==
Little is known of Buffalo Hump's early life: education in his youth and training as a warrior, together with his cousin Yellow Wolf (Isaviah, spelled also Sa-viah and sometimes misspelled as Sabaheit, alias Small Wolf), went on under their uncle Mukwooru's ("Spirit Talker") influence and their cursus honorum (i.e., rising through the ranks) was in its full development during the Mexican domination of Texas. Their more northern kinsmen Yamparika, Kotsoteka, Nokoni and Kwahadi warriors, under such leaders as Ten Bears, Tawaquenah (“Big Eagle” or “Sun Eagle”), Wulea-boo (“Shaved Head”), Huupi-pahati (“Tall Tree”), Iron Jacket, and their allies the Kiowas, were accustomed to fighting in the Arkansas River country against their Cheyenne and Arapaho foes, just as the Penatekas fought other northern tribes.

In 1829 Buffalo Hump and, presumably, Yellow Wolf led their warriors northward to recover a large herd of horses stolen by a Cheyenne party, and the young Penateka braves proved themselves against these northern enemies. The Penateka party came on a Cheyenne village near the Bijou Creek, north of Bent's Corral (Huerfano River), and stormed the whole herd of horses; however another Cheyenne party of about 20 warriors, equipped with some rifles, led by the famous Cheyenne chief also called Yellow Wolf stole back the animals; the Comanche party chased the fleeing enemies for a distance, but finally gave up to avoid an ambush. Still in 1829, Buffalo Hump and Yellow Wolf (Cheyenne) led also a big raid against the Mexican settlements in the Guadalupe Valley, achieving a fame as raiders among the Mexican people, but causing the failure of Mukwooru and Incoroy in their negotiations to reach an agreement with Mexican authorities. In 1835 Buffalo Hump and Yellow Wolf led 300 Comanche warriors in an attack against Parral, in the Sierra Madre Occidental (Chihuahua).

In 1838 Buffalo Hump, now an important war chief, placed Yellow Wolf in charge of the Penateka warriors and went with Amorous Man and Old Owl, to Houston, where they met President Sam Houston and signed a treaty with him. In December 1838, Mirabeau Lamar, a partisan of the clash with the Indians and of their expulsion from Texas, succeeded Houston, after which the peace agreement failed and fighting restarted. Buffalo Hump, already made famous by the Council House fight of 1840, became a historically important figure when, flanked by Isaviah and Sanna Anna, he led a group of Comanches, mostly his own Penateka Comanche division plus allies from various other Comanche bands, in the Great Raid of 1840. Their goal was to get revenge on the Texans who had killed at the Council House thirty members of a delegation of Comanche Chiefs when they had been there under a flag of truce for negotiations.

== The Council House Fight ==
The Comanches who arrived at the Council House at San Antonio in the Republic of Texas in March 1840, under Lamar's Presidency, came with the intention to negotiate a peace treaty. They sent a delegation of 65 people, including a dozen chiefs of several bands and several women too, led by Mukwooru and Kwihnai (Eagle), under a white flag of truce, as they understood ambassadors should do. The Texans had expected the Comanches to bring several white captives as part of the agreement. At the meeting the chiefs explained they had brought in all of the captives their bands had: to-wit one, a girl sixteen years old (the young Mathilda Lockhart). The Texans did not understand the chiefs had no power over the other bands to force them to comply with the demands, and so pulled out guns and declared to the Indians they were now their prisoners until the rest of the captives were returned. Now under threat, the Comanches, who were without bows, lances or guns, fought back with their knives. The Texans had concealed heavily armed soldiers just outside the Council House and at the onset of the fighting the windows and doors were opened and the soldiers outside shot into the room at the Comanche ambassadors and their people. Thirty-five Comanches (among them all the chiefs, three women and two children) were slain, 29 were captured, and seven Texans were killed. Mukwooru's widow was sent back to her people to warn them that unless all the white prisoners kept by the Comanches were relinquished, the Comanche prisoners at San Antonio would be killed. This massacre resulted in lasting bitterness among the Comanche people. Isimanica led a party 300 warriors strong to the outskirts of San Antonio, challenging the Texas militia barracked in San Josè Mission, to come out and fight, but the Texans didn't accept his challenge. After this, Piava, a minor chief, brought to San Antonio three white prisoners, but probably the Comanches killed the other captives. Pahayuca and Mupitsukupʉ became the Penateka principal chiefs, and Buffalo Hump became the principal war chief, with Yellow Wolf and Santa Anna as his lieutenants and partners.

== The Great Raid of 1840 ==
Buffalo Hump was determined to do more than merely complain about what the Comanches viewed as a bitter betrayal; in the summer he called a council, spreading word to the other bands of Comanches that he, Yellow Wolf and Santa Anna were going for a great raid against the white settlements in Texas as a revenge; in the meanwhile, Buffalo Hump, Yellow Wolf, Santa Anna and Isimanica, with 400 warriors, were raiding the settlements between Bastrop and San Antonio, exhausting the Rangers and Militia's detachments. When they were ready, in late July 1840, Buffalo Hump, along with Yellow Wolf, Santa Anna and likely Isimanica, led the Penateka warriors in the Great Raid, and old Mupitsukupʉ too joined the biggest war party. According to the Comanche tradition, all the principal Comanche chiefs took part in the Great Raid: if so, also Ten Bears, Tawaquenah (“Big Eagle” or “Sun Eagle”), Wulea-boo (“Shaved Head”), Huupi-pahati (“Tall Tree”), Iron Jacket, and possibly their allies the Kiowa, like Dohasan and Satank, could have had a role. On this raid the Comanches went all the way from the plains of west Texas to the cities of Victoria and Linnville on the Texas coast. Linnville was the second largest port in Texas at that time. In what may have been the largest organized raid by the Comanches to that point, they raided, burned, and plundered these towns. The Comanches killed a large number of slaves and captured more than 1,500 horses.

== The Battle of Plum Creek ==
On the way back from the sea, the Comanches easily defeated three different Militia detachments under John Jackson Tumlinson Jr., Adam Zumwalt and Ben McCulloch (all together, 125 men) near the Garcitas Creek; then, they overwhelmed another Militia company (90 men) led by Lafayette Ward, James Bird and Matthew Caldwell along the trail to the San Marcos River; finally, they were attacked by Texas Rangers (all the companies of central and western Texas, under Jack Hays and Ben McCulloch), and militia (units from Bastrop and Gonzales, respectively under Ed Burleson and Mathew Caldwell), rallied under gen. Felix Huston, at the Battle of Plum Creek near Lockhart. This was later portrayed as a great Texan victory, but that is highly questionable: volunteers from Gonzales and from Bastrop had gathered to attempt to stop the war party and all the Ranger companies of east and central Texas, equipped with the new Colt Paterson revolvers, moved to intercept the Indians. They met at Plum Creek, near the town of Lockhart, on August 12, 1840; 80 Comanches were reported killed in the ensuing gun battle – unusually heavy casualties for the Comanches and their allies – but they got away with the bulk of their plunder and stolen horses,. The “defeated” Comanches (of whom only 12 bodies were recovered) seem to have viewed this fight as a great victory which did much to enhance the various chiefs’ prestige; if so it is unlikely that they suffered high casualties. The fact that the raiding party managed to escape with the majority of the stolen horses and most of their plunder casts doubt upon the Texans' version of events.

== Texas and the Penateka Comanche treaty negotiations ==
Despite the Council House massacre and the subsequent Great Raid of 1840, Sam Houston, once again the President of the Texas Republic following the Lamar Presidency, and Buffalo Hump with other chiefs, succeeded, in August 1843, in agreeing to a temporary treaty accord and a ceasefire between the Comanches, their allies, and the Texans. In October, the Comanches, hopeful of permanently establishing official Comancheria borders, agreed to meet with Houston and try to negotiate a treaty similar to the one just concluded at Fort Bird: the peace chiefs Pahayuca and Mupitsukupʉ, and others (the inclusion of Buffalo Hump, after the events at the Council House, showed the extraordinary Comanche belief in Houston), representing, for the first time, every major division of the Comanche in Texas (Penateka, but also Nokoni, Kotsoteka and Kwahadi) and their Kiowa and Kataka (“Kiowa Apaches”) allies were asked to free their white prisoners. In early 1844, Buffalo Hump and other Comanche leaders (Pahayuca, Mupitsukupʉ, and others, but not Yellow Wolf or Santa Anna) signed the treaty at Tehuacana Creek in which they agreed to return white captives in toto, and to cease raiding Texan settlements. In exchange for this, the Texans would cease military action against the Comanches, establish more trading posts, and recognize the boundary between Texas and Comanchería. Comanche allies, including the Wacos, Taweashes, Tawakonis, Kanoatinos, Keechis, belonging to the Wichita confederation, the Kiowa and Kiowa Apache, also agreed to join in the treaty. Unfortunately, the boundary provision was deleted by the Texas Senate in ratifying the final version. This caused Buffalo Hump to agree with Yellow Wolf (who had proved himself to have a more realistic view than Buffalo Hump in evaluating the settlers' concern for a fair and lasting peace) and Santa Anna's suspicions of the Texans motives, changing his stance to align himself with his cousin and the third war chief, and repudiate the treaty, and hostilities soon resumed.

In May 1846, following the annexation of Texas to the United States, Buffalo Hump led the Comanche delegation to treaty talks at Council Springs and signed a peace treaty with the United States,. Yellow Wolf and Santa Anna, aware they were no longer strong enough to oppose the US, or stop the ceaseless and massive flow of the immigrants, were with him. Buffalo Hump, nevertheless, declined an invitation to go to Washington and meet President James Polk, instead joining Isaviah in a great raiding party going to Mexico. In early 1847 some Penateka chiefs (Mupitsukupʉ, Buffalo Hump, Santa Anna, but, apparently, not Yellow Wolf) met the Indian agent Robert S. Neighbors, Johann O. von Meusebach and the German immigrants united in the “Adelsverein” in the San Saba River council, and authorized them to settle Fredicksburg, in the grant the Germans had bought between the Llano and the Guadalupe rivers. In May 1847 Pahayuca, Mupitsukupʉ, Buffalo Hump and Santa Anna again met Neighbors and learned that the U.S. Senate had suppressed the article of Council Springs treaty which forbade settlers from encroaching into the Comancheria. Santa Anna claimed the right to raid into Mexico and as the United States was then at war with Mexico, Neighbors didn't raise any objections, so that summer Buffalo Hump, Yellow Wolf, and Santa Anna led some hundreds warriors into Coahuila and Chihuahua, burning villages, stealing horses and kidnapping women and children all the way to San Francisco del Oro. On the way back the Comanches were engaged by U.S. dragoons near Parras, losing part of their booty. In August Yellow Wolf, Buffalo Hump, and Santa Anna were in Mexico once again, leading 800 warriors.

As war chief of the Penateka Comanche, Buffalo Hump, and Yellow Wolf too, dealt peacefully with American officials throughout the late 1840s and 1850s. In 1849, Buffalo Hump escorted Robert S. Neighbors and John S. “Rip” Ford's expedition along the first part of the trail from San Antonio to El Paso, as far as the Nokoni villages, Yellow Wolf and Shanaco (son of a chief killed in the Council House of San Antonio) joining him; at the Nokoni villages Buffalo Hump and Yellow Wolf entrusted their proteges to their old friend Huupi-pahati, the Nokoni chief, who brought the whites to their destination. In 1851 Yellow Wolf and Buffalo Hump once again led their warriors in a great raid into Mexico, raiding the states of Chihuahua and Durango.

== End of the Penateka freedom ==
In the summer of 1854 Neighbors and Captain Randolph B. Marcy carried out a reconnaissance in search of a potential reserve for the Comanche and selected two areas, allocating to the Penatekas 18.576 acres on the Clear Fork of the Brazos, approximately five miles from Camp Cooper. In November Neighbors went to the Penateka winter camp and persuaded Buffalo Hump and the far more malleable Shanaco, Ketumse and Asa-havey to go and settle in the reserve, but Yellow Wolf, who was still pressing for the recognition of a border between Texas and Comancheria, left the council, flatly refusing to go. One week later Yellow Wolf was killed by a party of Lipan hunters, after which Buffalo Hump temporized almost two years more. However, in 1856, he led his people to the newly established reservation. Continuous raids on this by horse thieves and squatters, coupled with his band's unhappiness over their lack of freedom and the poor food provided on the reservation, persuaded Potsʉnakwahipʉ to move his band off the reservation in 1858. While camped in the Wichita Mountains the Penateka Band under Buffalo Hump were attacked by United States troops under the command of Major Earl Van Dorn. Allegedly not aware that Buffalo Hump's band had recently signed a formal peace treaty with the United States at Fort Arbuckle, Van Dorn and his men killed 80 of the Comanches.

Nonetheless, an aged and weary Buffalo Hump led and settled his remaining followers on the Kiowa-Comanche reservation near Fort Cobb in Indian Territory in Oklahoma. There, in spite of his enormous sadness at the end of the Comanches' traditional way of life, he asked for a house and farmland so that he could set an example for his people. Attempting to live out his life as a rancher and farmer, he died probably before 1867.

== Portrayals ==
Buffalo Hump was played by Eric Schweig in the 1996 TV miniseries Dead Man's Walk, and by Wes Studi in the 2008 TV miniseries Comanche Moon (both part of the Lonesome Dove series). Buffalo Hump has also been portrayed by Horacio García Rojas in the History Channel series Texas Rising (2015) and by Wesley French in the German-language film Striving for Freedom (2013).

== See also ==
- Texas–Indian wars
- John Coffee Hays, admired by Chief Potsʉnakwahipʉ "Buffalo Hump"

== Bibliography ==
- Bial, Raymond. Lifeways: The Comanche. New York: Benchmark Books, 2000.
- Brice, Donaly E. The Great Comanche Raid: Boldest Indian Attack on the Texas Republic McGowan Book Co. 1987
- "Comanche" Skyhawks Native American Dedication (August 15, 2005)
- Brown, Dee. Bury My Heart at Wounded Knee: An Indian History of the American West, Holt, Rinehart & Winston, New York, 1970
- Chalafant, William J. Without Quarter: the Wichita Expedition and the fight on Crooked Creek, University of Oklahoma Press, Norman, 1991
- Dunnegan, Ted. Ted's Arrowheads and Artifacts from the Comancheria (August 19, 2005)
- Fehrenbach, Theodore Reed The Comanches: The Destruction of a People. New York: Knopf, 1974, ISBN 0-394-48856-3. Later (2003) republished under the title The Comanches: The History of a People
- Foster, Morris. Being Comanche.
- Fowler, Arlen L. The Black Infantry in the West, 1869-1891, University of Oklahoma Press, Norman, 1996
- Frazier, Ian. Great Plains. New York: Farrar, Straus, and Giroux, 1989.
- Hagan, William T. Quanah Parker, Comanche Chief, University of Oklahoma Press, Norman, 1976
- Haley, James L. The Buffalo War: the History of the Red River Indians Uprising of 1874, University of Oklahoma Press, Norman, 1976
- John, Elizabeth and Storms, A.H. Brewed in Other Men's Worlds: The Confrontation of the Indian, Spanish, and French in the Southwest, 1540–1795. College Station, TX: Texas A&M Press, 1975.
- Jones, David E. Sanapia: Comanche Medicine Woman. New York: Holt, Rinehart and Winston, 1974.
- Leckie, William H. The Buffalo Soldiers: A Narrative of the Negro Cavalry in the West, University of Oklahoma Press, Norman, 1967
- Lodge, Sally. Native American People: The Comanche. Vero Beach, Florida 32964: Rourke Publications, Inc., 1992.
- Lund, Bill. Native Peoples: The Comanche Indians. Mankato, Minnesota: Bridgestone Books, 1997.
- Mooney, Martin. The Junior Library of American Indians: The Comanche Indians. New York: Chelsea House Publishers, 1993.
- Newcomb, William W. Jr. The Indians of Texas: from Prehistorics to Modern Times, University of Texas Press, Austin, 1972
- Nye, Wilbur Sturtevant. Carbine and Lance: The Story of Old Fort Sill, University of Oklahoma Press, Norman, 1983
- Native Americans: Comanche (August 13, 2005).
- Richardson, Rupert N. The Comanche Barrier to South Plains Settlement: A Century and a Half of Savage Resistance to the Advancing White Frontier. Glendale, CA: Arthur H. Clark Company, 1933.
- Rollings, Willard. Indians of North America: The Comanche. New York: Chelsea House Publishers, 1989.
- Secoy, Frank. Changing Military Patterns on the Great Plains. Monograph of the American Ethnological Society, No. 21. Locust Valley, NY: J. J. Augustin, 1953.
- Schilz, Jodye Lynn Dickson and Schilz, Thomas F. Buffalo Hump and the Penateka Comanches, Texas Western Press, El Paso, 1989
- Streissguth, Thomas. Indigenous Peoples of North America: The Comanche. San Diego: Lucent Books Incorporation, 2000.
- "The Texas Comanches" on Texas Indians (August 14, 2005).
- Wallace, Ernest, and Hoebel, E. Adamson The Comanche: Lords of the Southern Plains, University of Oklahoma Press, Norman, 1952.
- Webb, Walter Prescott The Texas Rangers: a Century of Frontier Defense, University of Texas Press, Austin, 1983
- "Comanche" on the History Channel (August 26, 2005)
