= Old Owl =

Old Owl Mupitsukupʉ
- Born: late 1780s Edwards Plateau, Texas
- Died: 1849
- Citizenship: Comanche Nation
- Occupation: War Chief
- Known for: military leadership

Old Owl (Comanche: Mupitsukupʉ; c. late 1780s – 1849) was a Native American Chief of the Penateka band of the Comanche Indians.

== Early life ==
Nothing is known of his youth or early years. Older than the two war chiefs, Old Owl was a member of the same band of the Comanche as the more famous Buffalo Hump (Potsʉnakwahipʉ), Yellow Wolf (Saviah) and Santa Anna. Although known as a civil, or peace, Chief, he was known to lead war parties. He was an important chief, though probably less influential than Buffalo Hump during the 1830s and 1840s. He was originally, along with Buffalo Hump and Santa Anna, a leader of Comanche resistance to Anglo settlement in Texas, especially during the period following the Council House Fight.

== Council House Fight ==
Like most Comanche Chiefs, Old Owl came to white attention following the Council House Fight. He, along with Santa Anna, was part of the Great Raid of 1840 which Buffalo Hump organized to take revenge for what the Comanche viewed as the "utter betrayal of their people at the Council House." But Old Owl was the first among the Comanche Chiefs to recognize that defeating the whites was unlikely. He began advocating peace around 1842, and is best known for his meeting with Robert Neighbors and his subsequent signing of the Meusebach-Comanche Treaty."

== Robert Neighbors and Old Owl ==
Robert Neighbors recorded one of the best known meetings with Old Owl. While he was a Texas Indian Agent for the Republic in 1845, Major Neighbors was at a Tonkawa camp. Old Owl arrived with 40 warriors and, in a manner the Major called "most insolent," demanded that the Tonkawa feed the war party and their horses, and provide for them entertainment. The Tonkawas, in fear of their lives, provided 40 women, food and shelter, and cared for the horses at once. Neighbors, who had just been appointed Indian Agent for all Texas Indians including the Comanche, took this opportunity to meet some of his new charges, and told them he was hopeful of civilizing them. Old Owl, introduced to Neighbors, complimented him on his fine blue coat. Neighbors, understanding the meaning of this compliment, presented the Chief with the coat immediately. Other warriors admired his pants, boots, and other clothing, and soon Neighbors was standing only in a nightshirt.

Old Owl, however, took a liking to the fearless Neighbors. He told him though most whites irritated him, he liked Neighbors, and invited him to accompany the war party, and he proposed instead of Neighbors making a civilized man of him, that he would make a fine Comanche, warrior and horse thief out of Neighbors. The war party with Neighbors, who felt this was no time to decline, went to Mexico, where Neighbors attempted to buy beef on credit to feed the warriors. When the Mexicans declined to sell beef to a Republic of Texas official on credit, Old Owl told them two beeves were to be forthcoming immediately, or the hacienda would be burned down and every living being killed. This proved highly effective, and the food was immediately forthcoming.

Neighbors, having left an indelible impression on Old Owl as the first Republic of Texas official to ever ride with a Comanche War Party, (and the only Republic of Texas official to ever ride with a war party), took his leave of them with thanks, and went home.

== Old Owl and the Meusebach-Comanche Treaty ==
When the Germans decided a treaty was possible with the fierce Comanche, Old Owl was one of the Chiefs they negotiated with. Geologist Dr. Ferdinand von Roemer was present at those treaty talks, which resulted in the Meusebach-Comanche Treaty, and left an enduring and vivid portrait of the three chiefs who were representing the Comanche bands, including Old Owl (the others being Buffalo Hump and Santa Anna):

The three chiefs, who were at the head of all the bands of the Comanches roaming the frontiers of the settlements in Texas looked very dignified and grave. They differed much in appearance. [Old Owl] the political chief, was a small old man who in his dirty cotton jacket looked undistinguished and only his diplomatic crafty face marked him. The war chief, Santa Anna, presented an altogether different appearance. He was a powerfully built man with a benevolent and lively countenance. The third, Buffalo Hump, was the genuine, unadulterated picture of a North American Indian. Unlike the majority of his tribe, he scorned all European dress. The upper part of his body was naked. A buffalo hide was wound around his hips. Yellow copper rings decorated his arms and a string of beads hung from his neck. With his long, straight black hair hanging down, he sat there with the earnest (to the European almost apathetic) expression of countenance of the North American savage. He drew special attention to himself because in previous years he had distinguished himself for daring and bravery in many engagements with the Texans.

== Death ==
Like so many of the Comanche, including his compatriot and friend Santa Anna, Old Owl died during the cholera and smallpox epidemics of 1848-49. It is believed, like Santa Anna, he died of cholera in 1849, but he may have died the previous year during the smallpox epidemic. It is estimated that the overall Comanche population declined from approximately 20,000 to less than 12,000 in those two years.
