= Mukwooru =

Mukwoorʉ
- Born: late 1770s Comancheria
- Died: March 19, 1840; San Antonio, Texas
- Citizenship: Comanche Nation
- Occupation: Chief in Central Texas

Mukwoorʉ (based on Comanche: mukua, lit. 'Spirit') (Spirit Talker) (died March 19, 1840) was a 19th-century Penateka Comanche Chief and medicine man in Central Texas. His nephews were the two cousins Buffalo Hump and Yellow Wolf, both very important Penateka war chiefs during the 1840s and 1850s.

== Peace council ==
An important leader since the beginning of the 1820s, was chief and shaman; as their uncle, he trained the two cousins Buffalo Hump and Yellow Wolf, the most important war chiefs of the Penateka Comanches in the period between the Texas Independence and the Civil War; in 1829 he and Yncoroy tried to reach a peace agreement with the Mexican authorities, but a raid against the settlements in the Guadalupe valley led by Buffalo Hump and Yellow Wolf provoked the failure of this project; in 1838 he went to Houston, where he, Amorous Man, Old Owl, and Buffalo Hump met President Sam Houston and signed with him a treaty, while Yellow Wolf stayed in charge of the warriors. His village along the San Saba River was attacked in February 1839 by a detachment of Texas Rangers and their Tonkawa and Lipan auxiliaries, led by Col. John H. Moore. Most of the casualties were women and children. Mukwooru was the Comanche Chief who was chosen to represent the Penateka and Comanche in 1840. They had agreed to gather in San Antonio, Texas to try to make peace with the Texans. However, he was killed during the meeting in the Council House Fight.

== Sources ==
- Wallace, Ernest & Hoebel, E. Adamson. The Comanche: Lords of the Southern Plains, University of Oklahoma Press, Norman, 1952
- Schilz, Jodye Lynn Dickson and Thomas F.Schilz. Buffalo Hump and the Penateka Comanches, Texas Western Press, El Paso, 1989
- Nye, Wilbur Sturtevant. Carbine and Lance: The Story of Old Fort Sill, University of Oklahoma Press, Norman, 1983
- Leckie, William H. The Buffalo Soldiers: A Narrative of the Negro Cavalry in the West, University of Oklahoma Press, Norman, 1967
- Fowler, Arlen L. The Black Infantry in the West, 1869-1891, University of Oklahoma Press, Norman, 1996
- Brown, Dee. Bury My Heart at Wounded Knee: An Indian History of the American West, Holt, Rinehart & Winston, New York, 1970
