= Ten Bears =

Yamparika Comanche chief (~1790–1872)

Ten Bears Patua Sʉʉmarʉ
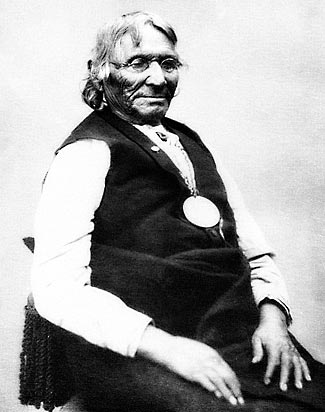
- Chief Ten Bears

Comanche leader
- In office 1850–1860

Paraiboo of the Yamparika Comanche

Personal details
- Born: c. 1790 Comancheria
- Died: November 23, 1872 Fort Sill, Indian Territory
- Resting place: Fort Sill Post Cemetery
- Known for: Attempting to negotiate peace between the United States and the Comanche

Ten Bears (Comanche: Pawʉʉrasʉmʉnurʉ or Patua Sʉʉmarʉ, Anglicized as Parua-wasamen and Parry-wah-say-mer in treaties and older documents) (c. 1790 – November 23, 1872) was the principal chief of the Yamparika or "Root Eater" division of the Comanche from ca. 1860-72. He was the leader of the Ketahto ("The Barefeet") local subgroup of the Yamparika, probably from the late 1840s.

The ethnonym (group name), Yamparika or "Root Eater" Comanche was known to the Spaniards of New Mexico as early as the 1750s, but until about 1790, they were generally north of the Arkansas River and so were seldom specifically mentioned in Spanish documents. After that time, with the advance of Cheyennes (Comanche: paka naboo 'striped arrows'), and Cuampes, likely Arapahos, some Yamparika local groups, including the Ketahto, relocated to the valley of the North Canadian River in New Mexico and Texas.

== Early life ==
Ten Bears was orphaned as a baby when his family group was murdered by Lakotas. Later Comanche oral history states that in his young adult years, he was noted for leading horse-mounted spear attacks on Lakota villages.

=== Rise to political prominence ===
Ten Bears was a key figure in making peace between the Comanches and the Utes in 1820. Ten Bears was often in rivalry with a man named either Isakwahip 'Wolf's Back', or Isakiip 'Wolf's Elbow', leader of another local group in the North Canadian valley. In 1840 the Yamparika chief, Ten Bears, was one among the principal promoters (together with the Kiowa chiefs Dohasan and Satank and the Arapaho Hosa Little Raven) of the peace and large alliance between the Comanche and Kiowa alliance and the Cheyenne and Arapaho alliance after the Cheyenne and Arapaho's victory at Wolf Creek during the spring 1838. To reach his purpose, Ten Bears (Parrawasamen) was able to gain the approval of such chiefs as the Kotsoteka Shaved Head (Wulea-boo) and, even through Shaved Head’s support, Big Eagle (a.k.a. Sun Eagle) (Tawaquenah), likely the Nokoni Tall Tree (Huupi-pahati) and certainly the Penateka Buffalo Hump (Pocheha-quehip, Potsʉnakwahipʉ) and Yellow Wolf (Isaviah) and probably the Kwahadi Iron Jacket (Pohebits-quasho); together with Ten Bears (Parrawasamen), probably Tawaquenah and Huupi-pahati, certainly Buffalo Hump (Pocheha-quehip) and eventually Iron Jacket (Pohebits-quasho) represented Comanche nation during the negotiation near the Two Butte Creek, resulting in a peace agreement and a strong alliance between the two groups.

Ten Bears first came to the attention of Anglo-Americans in 1853 when he, among others, signed the Treaty of Fort Atkinson. His name was written as "Parosawano" and translated as 'Ten Sticks', a confusion of /pawʉʉra/ 'bear' with /paria/ 'dogwood stick'. The error was corrected in the 1854 revision of the treaty.

Ten Bears became the principal Yamparika chief about 1860 after the death of the man known to Anglos as 'Shaved Head' (Wulea-boo, possibly a Kotsoteka rather than a Yamparika Comanche); the latter's Comanche name is uncertain as there were several men whom Anglos called by that name.

In August 1861 Ten Bears (likely being himself the chief named as “Bistevana”) signed the Fort Cobb Treaty with gen. Albert Pike, the Confederate Indian Commissioner, sanctioning an alliance with the “Gray Jackets”.

In 1863, along with a delegation of Western Indians, including Southern Cheyennes, Southern Arapahoes, and Kiowas, Ten Bears visited Washington, but he was unable to get any major concessions for his people from the U.S. government.

In November 1864, Ten Bears was the chief of the Yamparika Comanches nearest the ruins of the Bent brothers' old adobe trading post (the first Adobe Walls, Texas, built ca 1840) when troops under Col. Christopher 'Kit' Carson attacked a nearby Kiowa village . Warriors from Ten Bear's village led the counterattack which drove off Carson's men, although one of Ten Bears' sons, Ekamoksu 'Red Sleeve' was killed.

=== Treaty of the Little Arkansas River ===
In 1865, Ten Bears and two of his sons, Isananaka 'Wolf's Name' and Hitetetsi 'Little Crow', along with other Comanches, mostly Yamparikas, signed the Treaty of the Little Arkansas River in Kansas.

The treaty created a reservation for the Comanches encompassing the entire panhandle of Texas. This was problematic, as the Federal government did not then "own" that territory and therefore could not reserve it: the Republic of Texas was annexed to the United States in 1849, but the Republic did not recognize any native land claims within its borders — this opinion was based on a faulty reading of Spanish and Mexican law and therefore in 1865 there were no "federal" versus "state" owned lands within the boundaries of Texas which the Government could "reserve" to the Native Americans.

=== Medicine Lodge Treaty ===
Two years later, at the October 1867 Medicine Lodge Treaty Conference, Ten Bears and other Yamparikas as well as a few other Comanches (but none of the newly emergent Kwahada division, who were delayed by sickness), agreed to a smaller reservation in western Indian territory of Oklahoma.

At that conference, Ten Bears gave an eloquent address:

My heart is filled with joy when I see you here, as the brooks fill with water when the snow melts in the spring; and I feel glad, as the ponies do when the fresh grass starts in the beginning of the year. I heard of your coming when I was many sleeps away, and I made but a few camps when I met you. I know that you had come to do good to me and my people. I looked for benefits which would last forever, and so my face shines with joy as I look upon you. My people have never first drawn a bow or fired a gun against the whites. There has been trouble on the line between us and my young men have danced the war dance. But it was not begun by us. It was you to send the first soldier and we who sent out the second. Two years ago I came upon this road, following the buffalo, that my wives and children might have their cheeks plump and their bodies warm. But the soldiers fired on us, and since that time there has been a noise like that of a thunderstorm and we have not known which way to go. So it was upon the Canadian. Nor have we been made to cry alone. The blue dressed soldiers and the Utes came from out of the night when it was dark and still, and for camp fires they lit our lodges. Instead of hunting game they killed my braves, and the warriors of the tribe cut short their hair for the dead. So it was in Texas. They made sorrow come in our camps, and we went out like the buffalo bulls when the cows are attacked. When we found them, we killed them, and their scalps hang in our lodges. The Comanches are not weak and blind, like the pups of a dog when seven sleeps old. They are strong and farsighted, like grown horses. We took their road and we went on it. The white women cried and our women laughed.

But there are things which you have said which I do not like. They were not sweet like sugar but bitter like gourds. You said that you wanted to put us upon reservation, to build our houses and make us medicine lodges. I do not want them. I was born on the prairie where the wind blew free and there was nothing to break the light of the sun. I was born where there were no inclosures [sic] and where everything drew a free breath. I want to die there and not within walls. I know every stream and every wood between the Rio Grande and the Arkansas. I have hunted and lived over the country. I lived like my fathers before me, and like them, I lived happily.

When I was at Washington the Great Father told me that all the Comanche land was ours and that no one should hinder us in living upon it. So, why do you ask us to leave the rivers and the sun and the wind and live in houses? Do not ask us to give up the buffalo for the sheep. The young men have heard talk of this, and it has made them sad and angry. Do not speak of it more. I love to carry out the talk I got from the Great Father. When I get goods and presents I and my people feel glad, since it shows that he holds us in his eye.

If the Texans had kept out of my country there might have been peace. But that which you now say we must live on is too small. The Texans have taken away the places where the grass grew the thickest and the timber was the best. Had we kept that we might have done the things you ask. But it is too late. The white man has the country which we loved, and we only wish to wander on the prairie until we die. Any good thing you say to me shall not be forgotten. I shall carry it as near to my heart as my children, and it shall be as often on my tongue as the name of the Great Father. I want no blood upon my land to stain the grass. I want it all clear and pure and I wish it so that all who go through among my people may find peace when they come in and leave it when they go out.

== Death ==
A year later in December 1868, a number of Yamparika local bands, including Ten Bear's, were along the Washita River in western Indian Territory, near their allied Cheyennes and within the boundaries of the latter's reservation. When troops under Lt. Col George Armstrong Custer attacked the Cheyenne village under Black Kettle, Yamparika warriors from the village of Esarosavit 'White Wolf' joined in the counter attack, and "rode over" the detachment of Major Joel Elliot.

In 1872, Ten Bears again visited Washington, along with a delegation that included his grandson Cheevers (probably from the Spanish chiva 'goat', although Attocknie argues that it was tsii putsi 'little pitied one'), as well as other Comanches and Kiowas. But the hope that promises would be kept was ultimately futile. Ten Bears died soon after his return, November 23, 1872, at Fort Sill where he is buried.

== In popular media ==
Ten Bears, played by the Muscogee actor Will Sampson, is portrayed in the film The Outlaw Josey Wales as a Comanche chief defending his home who then makes a "live and let live" peace with the title character, portrayed by Clint Eastwood.

In Michael Blake's novel "Dances with Wolves," the character Ten Bears may be based on the Comanche leader of the same name. While the movie portrays the Native band as Lakota Sioux, the book names them specifically as Comanche. In the book, Ten Bears is portrayed as a wise, respected leader.

== Sources ==
- Wallace, Ernest & Hoebel, E. Adamson. The Comanche: Lords of the Southern Plains, University of Oklahoma Press, Norman, 1952
- Nye, Wilbur Sturtevant. Carbine and Lance: The Story of Old Fort Sill, University of Oklahoma Press, Norman, 1983
- Leckie, William H. The Buffalo Soldiers: A Narrative of the Negro Cavalry in the West, University of Oklahoma Press, Norman, 1967
- Fowler, Arlen L. The Black Infantry in the West, 1869-1891, University of Oklahoma Press, Norman, 1996
- Brown, Dee. Bury My Heart at Wounded Knee: An Indian History of the American West, Holt, Rinehart & Winston, New York, 1970
