= Meusebach–Comanche Treaty =

Agreement between the United States and Penateka Comanche tribe

Treaty Between the Comanche and the German Immigration Company
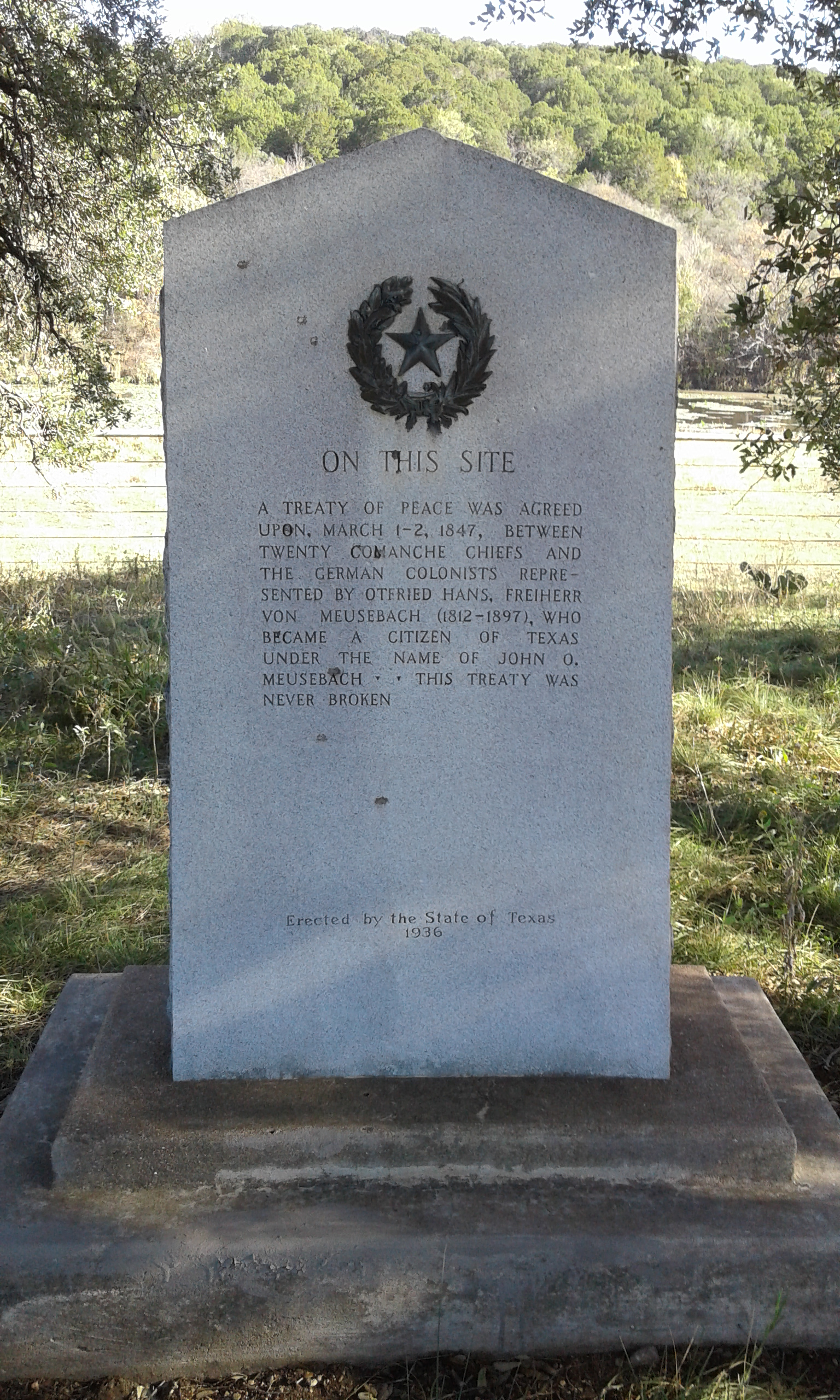
- Historical marker, erected in 1936, detailing the history of the treaty
- Signed: May 9, 1847
- Location: Fredericksburg, Texas
- Parties: German Immigration Company; Penateka Comanche

The Meusebach–Comanche Treaty was a treaty made on May 9, 1847 between the private citizens of the Fisher–Miller Land Grant in Texas (United States), who were predominantly German in nationality, and the Penateka Comanche Tribe. The treaty was officially recognized by the United States government. In 1936, a Recorded Texas Historic Landmark, Marker number 991, was placed in San Saba County to commemorate the signing of the treaty.

== Background ==
The Fisher-Miller land grant consisted of 3,878,000 acres (ca. 15,700 km²) between the Llano River and Colorado River, in the heart of the Comancheria. These lands constituted part of the hunting grounds of the Penateka Comanche Indians. When Henry Francis Fisher and Burchard Miller sold the grant to the Adelsverein, they were aware of the dangers of settling in Comancheria, but did not inform the Verein. Likewise, the Verein accepted the sale on face value and did not question it.

This land was earmarked for the settlement of immigrants who arrived in Texas under the sponsorship of the Society for the Protection of German Immigrants. Prince Carl of Solms-Braunfels, the first Commissioner of the society, had made it clear from the onset of the settlement plans that he was determined to find a way to coexist peacefully with the fierce Penateka Comanche. He was unable to do so, however, until John O. Meusebach took charge of the affairs of the German immigrants. Under Meusebach's leadership, and with the help of Indian Agent Robert Neighbors, regular expeditions into Indian-controlled lands took place both to survey the lands the Society wished to settle, and to find and negotiate with the Penateka Comanche.

== Role of the United States ==
Except for Neighbors, who regularly traveled safely into the Comancheria and who could offer anyone with him safe passage, other state and federal Government officials could not provide a guarantee of safe passage. Since military escorts for surveyors were unavailable, surveyors refused to enter the grant for fear of being attacked by the Indians. Thus, the United States played no role in this treaty, except to later recognize it. It remains the only treaty made between the Plains Tribe and settlers as private parties.

== Dr. Friedrich A. Schubbert ==
While at Nassau Plantation, Meusebach designated Dr. Friedrich A. Schubbert (Friedrich Armand Strubberg) the director of the colony at Fredericksburg, recommended by Henry Francis Fisher.

== Meusebach and the Penateka Comanche ==
The Fisher-Miller land grant awarded by the state of Texas contained provisions that the land had to be settled, or at least surveyed and settlement begun, by fall of 1847. Given these provisions, the Society realized it must either enter the Indian territory or forfeit the land grant. Meusebach raised a private mounted company including well-armed Germans and Mexicans, to protect American surveyors, who subsequently set out from Fredericksburg on January 22, 1847. Lorenzo de Rozas served as a guide and interpreter. He had been kidnapped by Comanches as a child and understood the language and culture.

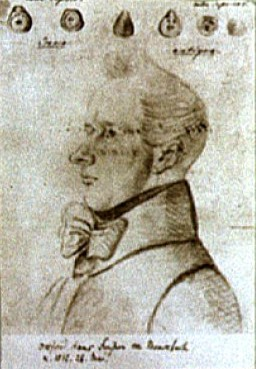
John O. Meusebach

En route, the group was approached by several English-speaking Shawnee, and Meusebach engaged three as hunters. The reddish-blonde haired John O. Meusebach was named El Sol Colorado (The Red Sun) by Penateka Comanche Chief Ketemoczy (Katemcy), who had encountered Meusebach and his group in the vicinity of present-day Mason. On February 18, they visited an old Spanish fort on the San Saba River, to determine viability for a settlement. It was a region said to be rich in silver deposits. In the ruins of Presidio San Sabá, they found etched the names of previous mineral speculators, including that of Jim Bowie who had been there in 1829. According to their agreement with Chief Ketemoczy, they returned to the Comanche camp at the next full moon, and commenced negotiations March 1–2, 1847.

Meusebach joined them in camp two days after their journey into the Comancheria began. Noted geologist Ferdinand von Roemer wrote a vivid and accurate account of the expedition which is still available. About ten days after the Meusebach group was gone, the Governor of Texas, James Pinckney Henderson, sent a Robert Neighbors to warn Meusebach of the possible consequences of entering Indian territory. He had been given orders that, had Meusebach already departed, to overtake them and offer to assist in the negotiations. Ferdinand von Roemer accompanied Neighbors. Unknown to the Governor, however, contacts with the Indians had already been made; Neighbors was able to convince Buffalo Hump to join, and the negotiations were fruitful. The final negotiating sessions took place on March 1 and 2 at the lower San Saba River Basin, about twenty-five miles from the Colorado River.

== Roemer's description of the Penateka Comanche Chiefs ==
Roemer, a noted German scientist who was traveling in America at the time of the meetings in the mid- and late 1840s between the Society and the Comanche Chiefs, attended the council between the chiefs and white representatives. He described the three Penateka Comanche chiefs as 'serene and dignified,' characterizing Old Owl as 'the political chief' and Santa Anna as an affable and lively-looking 'war chief'. Roemer characterizes Buffalo Hump vividly as:

The pure unadulterated picture of a North American Indian, who, unlike the rest of his tribe, scorned every form of European dress. His body naked, a buffalo robe around his loins, brass rings on his arms, a string of beads around his neck, and with his long, coarse black hair hanging down, he sat there with the serious facial expression of the North American Indian which seems to be apathetic to the European. He attracted our special attention because he had distinguished himself through great daring and bravery in expeditions against the Texas frontier which he had engaged in times past.

== The Treaty parties ==
The treaty was made between the powerful chiefs Buffalo Hump, Santa Anna, Old Owl for the Penateka Comanche, and Meusebach for the Society. Meusebach was called "El Sol Colorado" by the Penateka Comanches. (The name came from his long, flaring red beard). The Treaty was ratified in Fredericksburg two months later. The treaty's provisions allowed Meusebach's settlers to go unharmed into the Comancheria, and the Penateka Comanche to go to the white settlements. It also promised mutual reports on wrongdoing, and promised that both sides would curtail their lawbreakers. It also provided for survey of lands in the San Saba area with a payment of at least $1,000 to the Indians.

The Penateka also requested that a representative of the German colonists serve as an in-house intermediary and live among them. Emil Kriewitz was assigned to be the intermediary, and went to live at the camp of war chief Santa Anna.

The treaty opened more than 3,000,000 acres (12,000 km^{2}) of land to settlement by the Society.

== The Treaty today ==
Only five Adelsverein settlements were attempted in the Fisher-Miller land grant area: Bettina, Castell, Leiningen, Meerholz, and Schoenburg. Of these, only Castell survived. Fredericksburg borders on the grant, but does not fall within the grant itself.

The original Meusebach-Comanche treaty document was returned to Texas from Germany in 1970 by Mrs. Irene Marschall King, the granddaughter of John Meusebach. The document was presented to the Texas State Library in 1972, where it remains on display. The Treaty is one of the few pacts with Native Americans that was never broken.

== Text of the treaty ==
Treaty Between the Comanche and the German Immigration Company

May 9, 1847

Treaty

Between the Commissary General of the German Immigration Company, John O. Meusebach, for himself and his successors and constituents for the benefit and in behalf of the German people living here and settling the country between the waters of the Llano and the San Saba of the one part and the chiefs of the Comanche Nation hereunto named and subscribed for themselves and their people of the other part, the following private treaty of peace and friendship has been entered into and agreed upon:

I. The German people and Colonists for the Grant between the waters of the Llano and the San Saba shall be allowed to visit any part of said country, and be protected by the Comanche Nation and the Chiefs thereof, in Consideration of which agreement the Comanche may likewise come to the German colonies towns and settlements, and shall have no cause to fear, but shall go wherever they please – if not counselled otherwise by the especial agent of our great father – and have protection, as long as they walk in the white path.

II. In regard to the settlement on the Llano the Comanche promise not to disturb or in any way molest the German colonists, on the contrary, to assist them, also to give notice if they see Indians about the settlement who come to steal horses from or in any way molest the Germans – the Germans likewise promising to aid the Comanches against their enemies, should they be in danger of having their horses stolen or in any way to be injured. And both parties agree that if there be any difficulties or any wrong done by single bad men, to bring the name before the chiefs, to be finally settled and decided by the agent of our great father.

III. The Comanches and their great Chiefs grant to Mr. Meusebach, his successors and constituents the privilege of surveying the country as far as the Concho and even higher up, if he thinks proper to the Colorado and agree not to disturb or molest any men, who may have already gone up or yet to be sent up for that purpose. In consideration of which agreement the Commissary General Mr. Meusebach will give them presents to the amount of One Thousand Dollars, which with the necessary provisions to be given to the Comanches during their stay at Fredericksburgh will amount to about Two Thousand Dollars worth or more.

IV. And finally both parties agree mutually to use every exertion to keep up and even enforce peace and friendship between both the German and the Comanche people and all other colonists and to walk in the white path always and forever.

In witness whereof we have hitherunto set our hands, marks and seals. Done at Fredericksburgh on the water of the Rio Piedernales this ninth day of May A.D. 1847.

- John O. Meusebach
- R.L. Neighbors, Spec Agt U.S.
- F. Shubbert
- Jean Jacques von Coll
- John F. Torrey
- Felix A. von Blücher
- War Chiefs of the Delaware
  - Jim Shaw x mark
  - John Connors x mark
- War Chiefs of the Comanches
  - Santa Anna's x mark
  - Poch-an Sanachego's x mark
  - Moora-quitop x mark
  - Matasane x mark
  - To-shaw-wheschke x mark
  - Nokakwek x mark
