= Robert Neighbors =

Texas politician and Indian agent (1815-1859)

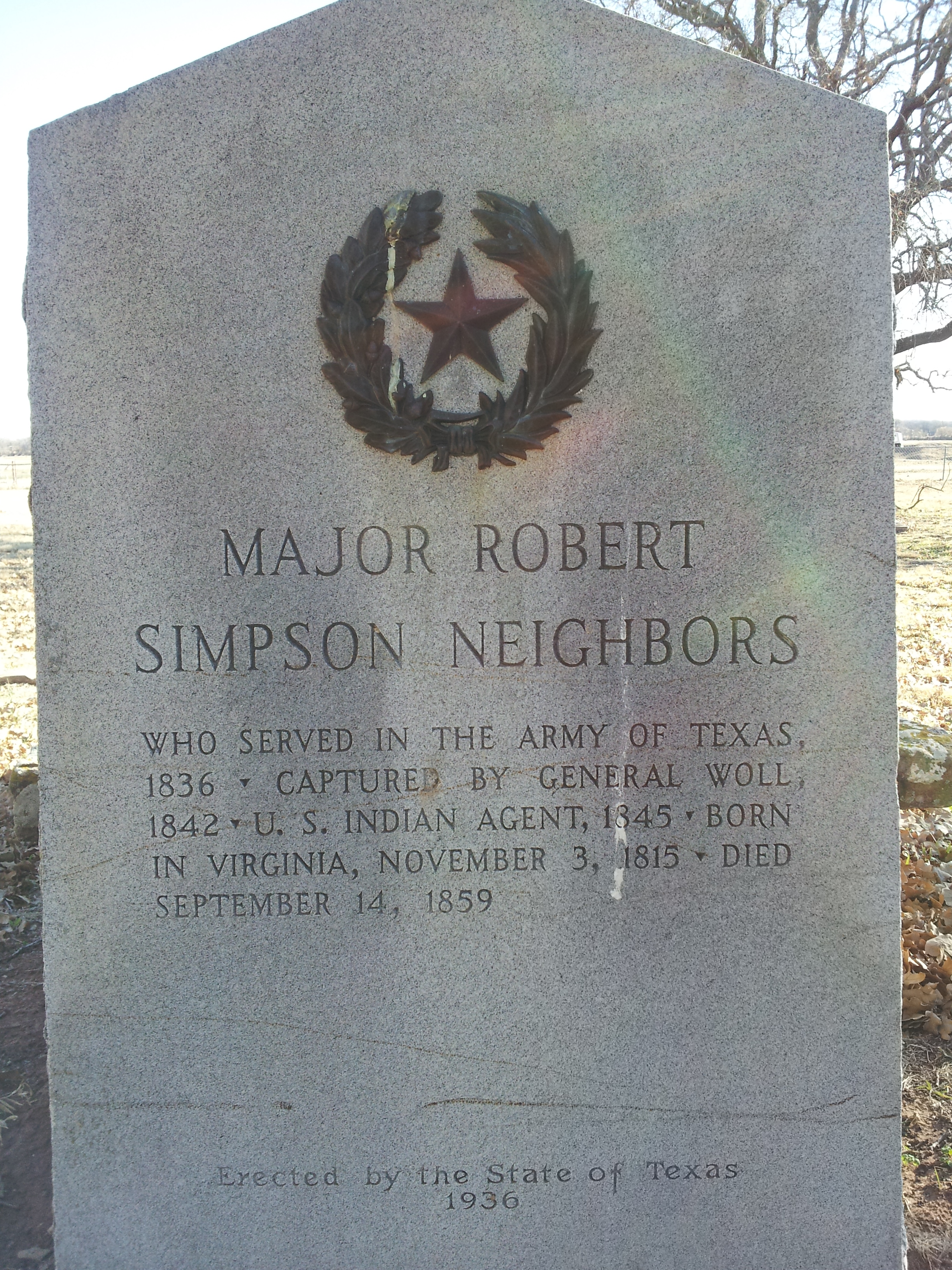
Robert Neighbors Texas Memorial Marker

Robert Simpson Neighbors (November 3, 1815 – September 14, 1859) was an Indian agent and Texas state legislator. Known as a fair and determined protector of Native American interests as guaranteed by treaty, he was murdered by a white man named Cornet, and his brother-in-law Patrick Murphy of Belknap, who accused Neighbors of having reported Murphy for horse thievery. Cornet shot Neighbors with a shotgun when he protested.

== Early life ==
Robert Simpson Neighbors was born in Charlotte County, Virginia, on November 3, 1815. He was the sole son of William and Elizabeth (Elam) Neighbours. In later life he chose to drop the u from his last name. He was orphaned at a mere four months old, when both parents died of pneumonia. He was later educated by private tutors, who were retained by his guardian, Samuel Hamner, a Virginia planter.

== Immigration to Texas and army service ==
Neighbors left Virginia at the age of nineteen, and while he stayed briefly in New Orleans, his intention was always to immigrate to Texas, which he did in the early spring of 1836. He joined the Army of the Republic of Texas on 30 January 1839 as a first lieutenant, commanding Fort Travis on Galveston Island before becoming quartermaster on 5 September, and promoted to captain on 15 July 1840 and served until the end of 1841.

== Capture by General Adrian Woll ==
On September 15, 1842, as a member of Captain John C. Hays's company of volunteers, Neighbors was in San Antonio attending Judge Anderson Hutchinson's court, when General Adrian Woll made his invasion of Texas and captured the city. Along with approximately fifty-two other individuals, including the officers of the court, he was forcibly marched to Mexico, where he was subsequently imprisoned in San Carlos Fortress.

== Indian Agent and the field system ==
Neighbors was released on March 24, 1844, and returned to Texas. He briefly operated the Mansion House hotel in Houston before becoming Indian Agent for the Republic of Texas on 12 February 1845. Thomas G. Western, Texas Superintendent of Indian Affairs, and Neighbors as Indian Agent for the Lipan Apaches and Tonkawas, initiated a new policy, the field system; instead of remaining at the agency headquarters and waiting for the Indians to pay him a visit, as was the common practice, Neighbors dealt with them directly in their homelands.

After the annexation of the Republic of Texas by the United States, Neighbors was a party to Treaty 246 between the US, represented by Indian commissioners Pierce M. Butler and M.G. Lewis, and the chiefs of the Comanches, Ionies, Anadarkos, Caddos, Lipans, Tonkawas, Keechies, Tawacanos, Wichitas and Wacos, signed near Waco on 15 May 1846. Neighbors then accompanied the Penateka Comanche chiefs Old Owl and Santa Anna, plus the Anadarko chief Jose Maria, on their visit to Washington, D.C.

He received a federal appointment as special Indian agent, on March 20, 1847, and took part in the treaty between the Comanche and the German colonists on the San Saba River in March 1847, which resulted in the so-called Meusebach-Comanche Treaty.

As a Federal Indian Agent for the Comanches, he continued what was considered a most unusual practice, actually visiting the Native Americans in their homes, and learning their language and culture. Called the "field system" it was unique for its time. The ultimate result was that he spent much time far beyond the then frontier, and in the opinion of historians, exercised greater influence over the Indians in Texas than any other white man of his generation. Indeed, other than Sam Houston, he was one of the few white men to bother to learn their language and culture, let alone travel to the heart of the Comancheria.

== Adoption by the Comanche ==
In 1845 as an Indian Agent for the Republic of Texas, Robert Neighbors recorded one of the best known meetings with the Penateka Comanche head Chief Old Owl, while visiting a Tonkawa camp. Chief Old Owl arrived with 40 warriors, and in a manner the Major called "most insolent and domineering" demanded that the Tonkawa feed the war party and their horses, and provide for them entertainment. The Tonkawas "obeyed with alacrity", providing "forty of the best looking Tonkawa maidens". Neighbors, known as a fearless man, took this opportunity to be introduced to the Comanches. Old Owl, introduced to Neighbors, first complimented him on his fine blue coat. Neighbors, understanding the meaning of this compliment, presented the Chief with the coat immediately. Other warriors admired his pants, boots, and other clothing, and soon Neighbors was standing only in a nightshirt. Old Owl however, took a liking to the fearless Neighbors. He told him though most whites irritated him, he liked Neighbors, and invited him to accompany the war party, and he proposed instead of Neighbors making a civilized man of him, that he would make a fine horse thief out of Neighbors, and adopt him into the tribe. Neighbors, feeling this was an opportunity few men would ever receive, accepted at once. The war party went to Mexico, where Neighbors attempted to buy beef at a rancho. When the Mexicans declined to sell beef to a Republic of Texas official on credit, Old Owl told them two beeves were to be forthcoming immediately, or the rancho would be burned down and all the beeves taken. This proved highly effective, and the food was immediately forthcoming.

Neighbors, having left an indelible impression on Old Owl as the first (and only) Republic of Texas official to ever ride with a Comanche War Party, took his leave of them with thanks, and went home.

== Neighbors Expedition ==
Early in the spring of 1849, Major General William J. Worth, of the United States Army, who was in command of the Eighth Military Department, which included the former Republic of Texas, was ordered by Secretary of War William L. Marcy to explore a wagon route between San Antonio and El Paso. The General, headquartered in San Antonio, selected Neighbors to lead the expedition to establish the so-called "upper route" to El Paso. His reasoning was that Neighbors was perhaps the only man in Texas who could safely ride into the Comancheria.

Neighbors led a combined military-Ranger force that included his personal friend "Rip" Ford and did in fact map a route that not only became the route used by the Overland Stage Company, but is the same route taken by the highway today. Indeed, Neighbors reported 598 miles between Austin (as the state capital) and El Paso – exactly the same mileage listed today between the two cities. In addition to Ford on the expedition, Neighbors was able to convince Buffalo Hump to lead it; Penateka war chiefs Yellow Wolf (Buffalo Hump's cousin) and Santa Anna joined them along the trail. Though the chief later left the party, it remained under his protection, and Nokoni Comanche head Chief Tall Tree, or Guadalupe, led the party the remainder of the distance from the Colorado River to El Paso. Neighbors' ability to communicate with the Comanche, and his relationship with them, made the expedition possible.

== Brazos Indian Reservation ==
In those days, appointments for such posts as federal Indian Agent were determined in great part by the political party in power, and the political affiliation of the agent. Neighbors was a Democrat, so his services as Indian agent were terminated by the elections and subsequent national Whig administration in September 1849. Neighbors stayed in public life however. Appointed as a Texas commissioner, he was sent by Texas Governor Peter Hansborough Bell to organize El Paso County in February and March 1850. He then attempted, without success, to organize counties in New Mexico as a part of Texas, being opposed by Judge Joab Houghton.

He was a member of the Fourth Texas Legislature, representing the Bexar and Medina District from 1851 to 1853. In 1852, he and state senator "Rip" Ford sponsored a resolution calling for Texas to negotiate with the federal government to settle the Indians in northern Texas. After urging from Secretary of War Jefferson Davis to Governor Bell, the Texas legislature passed a law in 1854 granting twelve leagues of land for establishing Indian reservations.

Neighbors became a presidential elector in 1852, and following the election of Franklin Pierce in 1853, was appointed supervising agent of the Indian service in Texas. In 1854, Neighbors and Capt. Randolph B. Marcy, with an escort of forty soldiers, left Fort Belknap in search of recommended sites for two Indian reservations to be established in 1855. Sites for the Caddo, Shawnee, Anadarko, Waco, Tawacano, and Tonkawa, were located along the north side of the Salt Fork Brazos River, south of what is now Graham in Young County. This area became the Brazos Indian Reservation. The reservation's log buildings included the agent's house, an office, a commissary store, a laborer's house, a school, a blacksmith, an interpreter's house, a privy, and a spring house; there were also several dome-shaped thatched native houses.

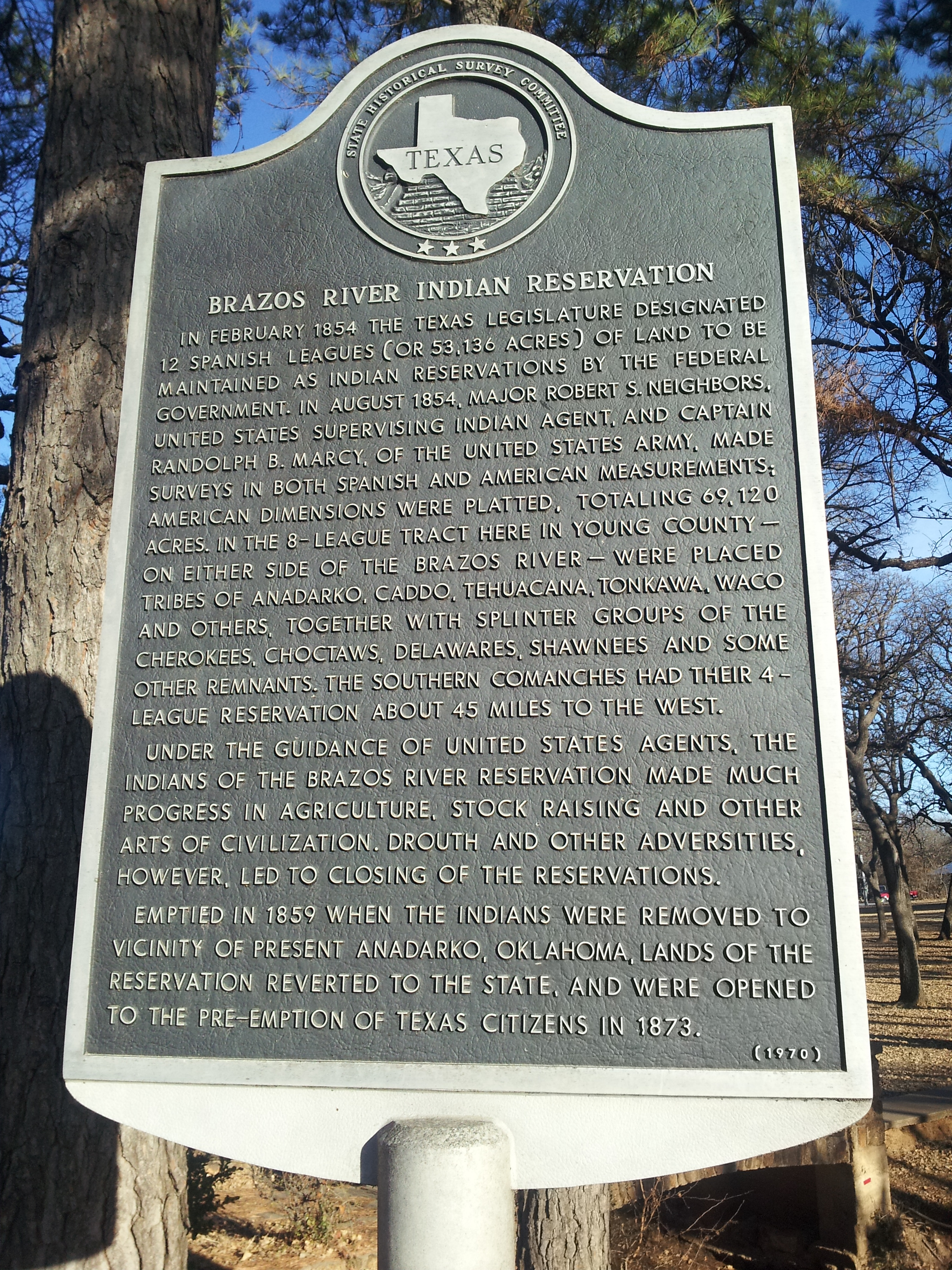
Brazos Indian Reservation Texas Historical Marker

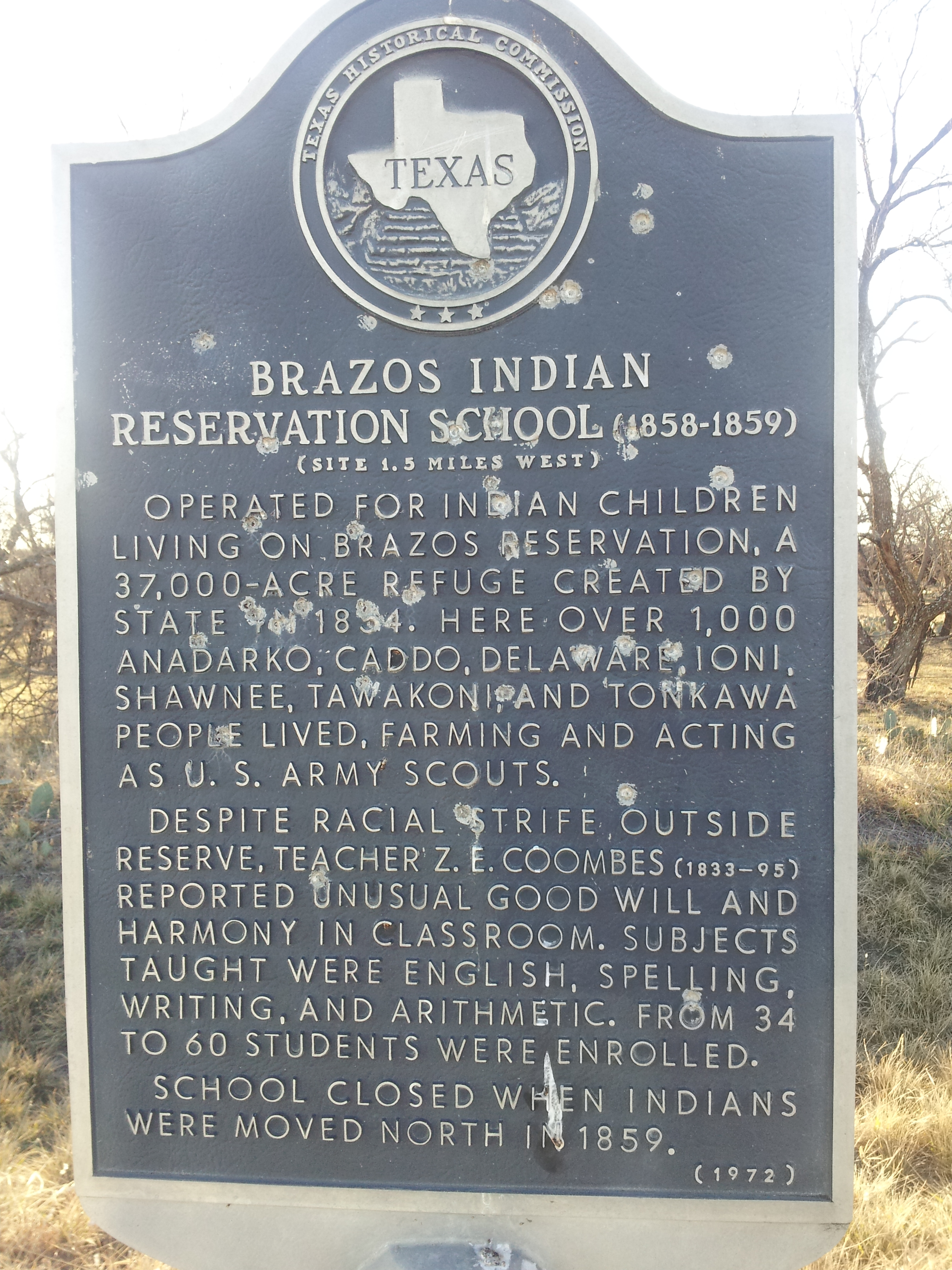
Brazos Indian Reservation School Texas Historical Marker

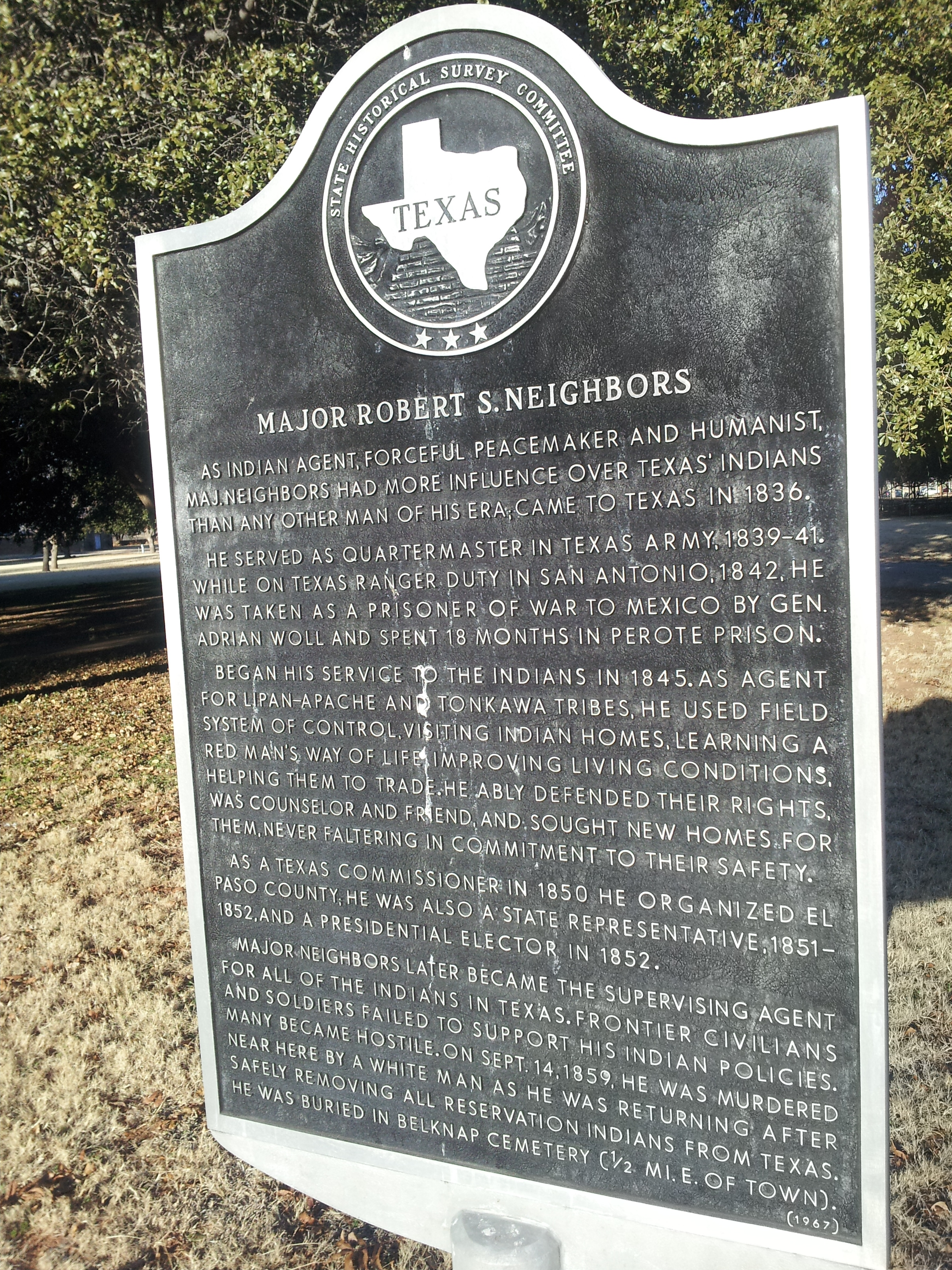
Robert Neighbors Texas Historical Marker at Fort Belknap

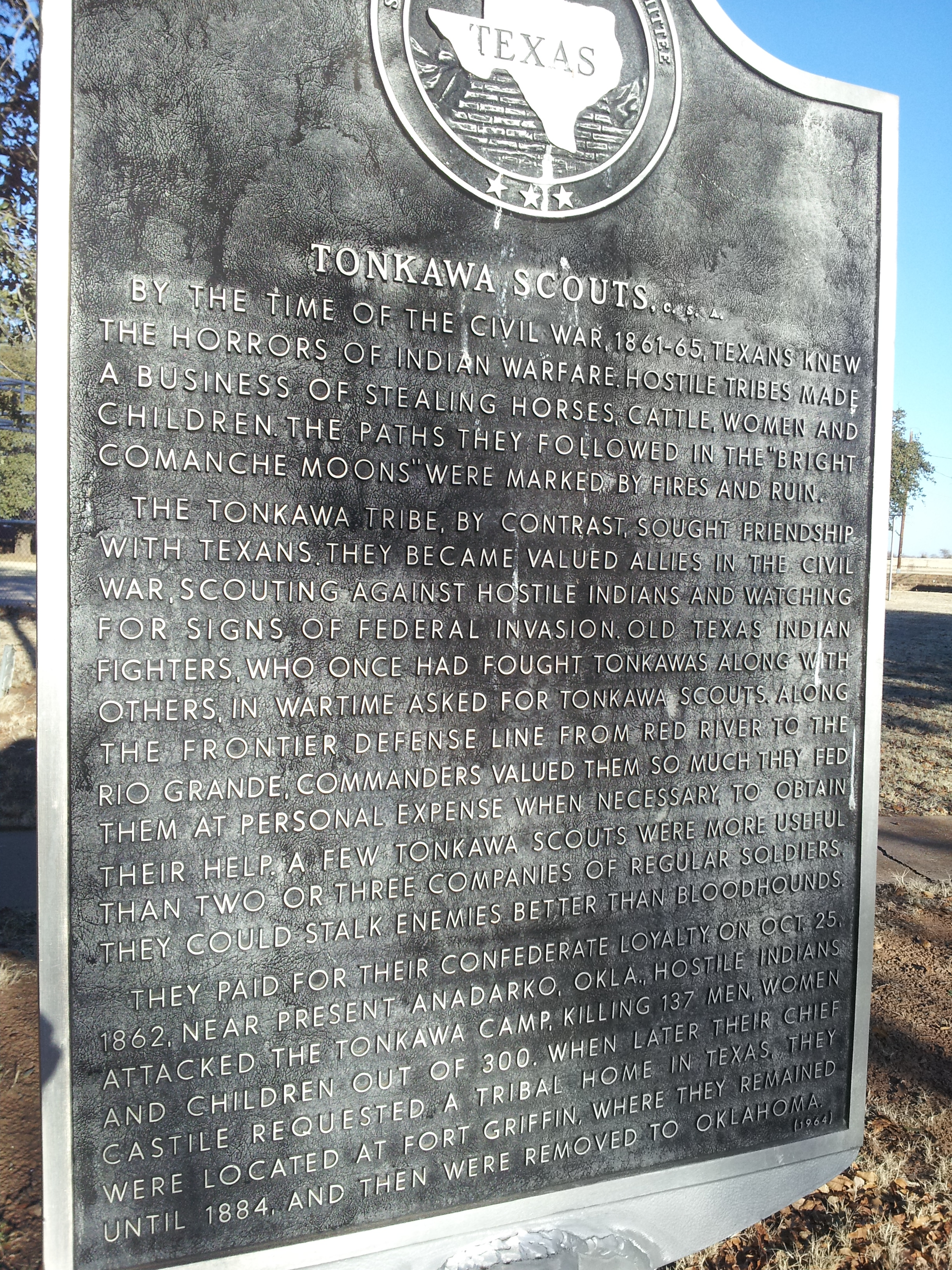
Tonkawa Scouts Texas Historical Marker at Fort Belknap

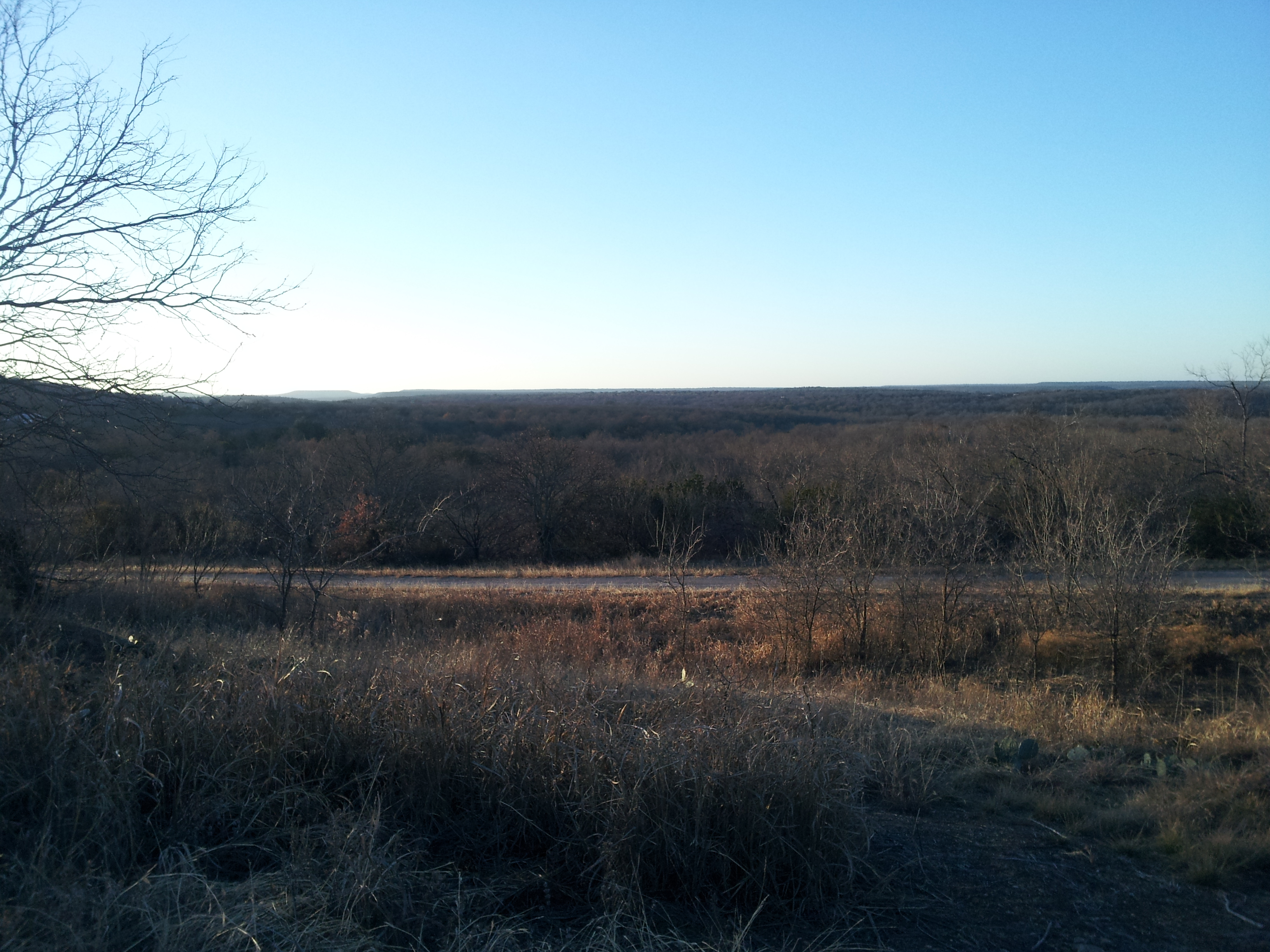
Brazos Indian Reservation looking south towards the Brazos River and the former site of the Anadarko and Caddo villages

== Camp Cooper and the Comanche Indian Reservation ==
The Penateka Comanches were located on the Comanche Indian Reservation located on the Clear Fork Brazos River, about ten miles southwest of what is now Throckmorton in Throckmorton County. The reservation log cabin buildings included the agent's house, commissary store, laborer's house, a school and Chief Ketumse's house plus the tribal member's tents.

Providing defense for the reservation was Camp Cooper, founded on January 3, 1856 by Major William J. Hardee and named in honor of Samuel Cooper. The camp was commanded by Lt. Col. Robert E. Lee of the Second Cavalry from 1856 to 1857. In a letter dated Camp Cooper, 12 April 1856, he wrote:

We are in the Comanche Reserve with the Indian camps below us on the river, belonging to Catumseh's band, whom the Government is trying to humanize. It will be up hill work I fear. Catumseh has been to see me and we have had a talk, very tedious on his part and very sententious on mine. I hailed him as a friend, as long as his conduct and that of his tribe deserved it, but would meet him as an enemy the first moment he failed to keep his word.

Officers serving under Lee's command at the camp included Captain Earl Van Dorn, Captain George Stoneman, and Captain Theodore O'Hara. Major George H. Thomas succeeded Lee as commander and was wounded while pursuing Comanche warriors. The camp of 250 men under the command of Capt. S.D. Carpenter was abandoned to Col. W.C. Dalrymple, Texas Troops on 21 February 1861, after General David E. Twiggs agreed to surrender all federal military posts.

== Death ==
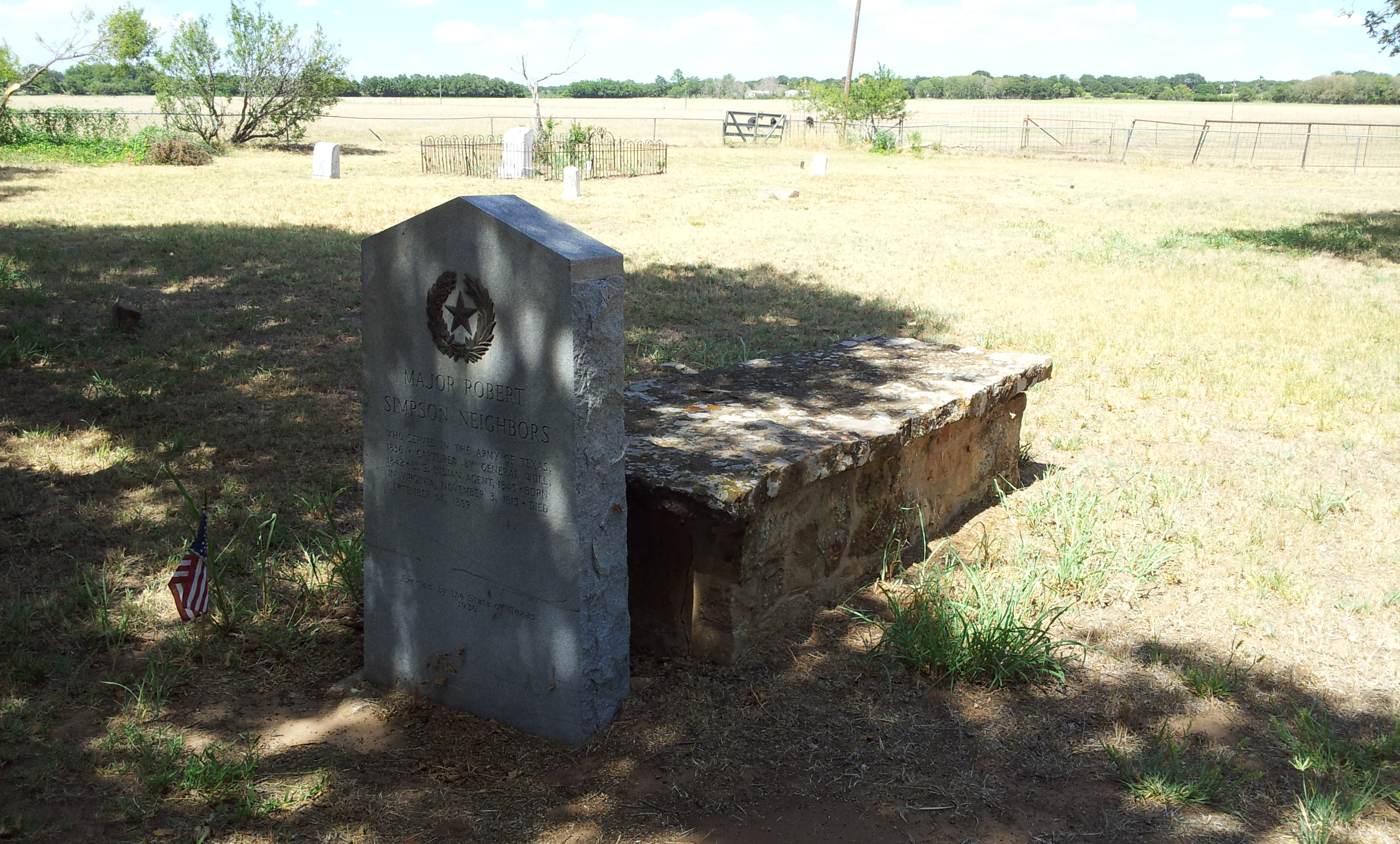
Gravestone of Maj. Robert S. Neighbors at Fort Belknap near Newcastle, Texas

It was during this period, when settlers began to attack the Indians, that Neighbors became hated among white Texans. Neighbors reported that the United States Army officers located at the posts of Fort Belknap and Camp Cooper, near the reservations, failed to give adequate support to him and his resident agents, and adequate protection to the Indians and settlers alike.

The military's attitude was shared by the settlers, who believed the reservation Indians were committing continuing raids on white settlements. In spite of continuous threats against his life, Neighbors never faltered in his determination to protect the Indians.

"The main source of opposition to Major Neighbors and the reservation policy was John R. Baylor, the former Comanche agent ... apparently blamed Major Neighbors for his dismissal and resented him bitterly ... arousing public opinion to oust the Major ... destroying the reservation ..."

With the aid of federal troops, Neighbors managed to protect the Indians on the reservations, successfully thwarting an attack on 23 May 1859 by John Baylor and 250 marauders.

Convinced however that the Indians, especially the Comanche, would never be safe in Texas due to the continuing raids of those bands still resisting white settlement of the Comancheria, he determined to move all Indians to safety in the Indian territories.

In August 1859 he, and four companies of troops under Major George H. Thomas, succeeded in moving 1420 Indians, without loss of life, to a new reservation in Indian Territory. Attacked while returning to Texas, Neighbor's party headed for Fort Belknap with Colonel Leeper as a casualty.

Neighbors proceeded to the nearby village of Belknap the next morning to "wind up his accounts as superintendent of Indian affairs", where on September 14, 1859, while Neighbors was speaking with two men, he was shot in the back by Edward Cornett.

Historians believe the assassination was a direct result of Neighbors' actions protecting the Comanche. He was buried in the civilian cemetery at Fort Belknap.

== Personal life ==
Robert Simpson Neighbors was a Methodist, a Mason, and a leader in the temperance movement. He had married Elizabeth Ann Mays in Seguin, Texas, on July 15, 1851, and their home was on his Salado Creek ranch, now part of San Antonio, Texas. Two sons survived childhood.

== See also ==
- Texas Memorial Museum
- California Road
