= Santa Anna (Comanche) =

Comanche chief (c.1800-1849)

- Santanta

Penateka leader

Personal details
- Born: ca. 1800 Edward's Plateau, Texas
- Died: 1849 Red River, Texas
- Known for: Famous Comanche Chief; Council House Fight; Great Raid of 1840; Battle of Plum Creek
- Nickname: Santana

Santa Anna (Comanche: Santanta; c. 1800 – 1849) was a war chief of the Penateka tribe of the Comanche.

== Early life ==
Santa Anna was a member of the Penateka division of the Comanche tribe in the same area as the war chiefs Buffalo Hump and Yellow Wolf. Santa Anna, "a large, fine-looking man with an affable and lively countenance," rose to prominence in the years following the Texas Revolution. He was the father of Carne Muerto, later a war chief of the Quahadi tribe of Comanche.

== Great Raid of 1840 ==
Following the deadly Council House Fight, where the Comanche felt that the Whites had slaughtered their envoys despite the promise of the white treaty flag, conflict between Comanches and migrating Anglo-Texans had become increasingly frequent. Santa Anna advocated armed and bitter resistance to the white invasion of the Comancheria and gained prominence in San Antonio in 1840. For approximately the next five years he joined Buffalo Hump and a number of other war chiefs in conducting a series of raids and attacks on Anglo settlements, including the Great Raid of 1840, during which the Comanche burned two cities and raided all the way to the sea.

Though tracing his direct involvement with any sort of precision is today impossible, Santa Anna probably took part in the raids on Linnville and Victoria in 1840, and may have been present at the Battle of Plum Creek. Prior to 1845, he was firmly identified with the faction of his tribe that opposed accommodation with Whites.

== After the Great Raid ==
Before 1845, Santa Anna was firmly identified with the militant faction of his tribe that opposed accommodation with Whites. No record has been found of his meeting with officials representing the government of the Republic of Texas. He appeared during this time to be even more militant than Buffalo Hump, who had met with Sam Houston in 1843–44, often taking sides with Yellow Wolf. In the latter part of 1845, though, he was convinced to attend treaty negotiations conducted by United States officials, where he was first exposed to the true numbers and weaponry of the Whites. Convinced that his people could simply not defeat or long resist the numbers and weapons of the Whites, he began advocating peace. In May 1846, he was one of the Comanche chiefs who signed a treaty promising peace between his people and American citizens in Texas.

Geologist Ferdinand von Roemer was present at those treaty talks, which resulted in the Meusebach-Comanche Treaty and left an enduring and vivid portrait of Santa Anna:

The three chiefs, who were at the head of all the bands of the Comanches roaming the frontiers of the settlements in Texas looked very dignified and grave. They differed much in appearance. [Old Owl] the political chief, was a small, old man who in his dirty cotton jacket looked undistinguished, and only his diplomatic crafty face marked him. The war chief, Santa Anna, presented an altogether different appearance. He was a powerfully built man with a benevolent and lively countenance. The third, Buffalo Hump, was the genuine, unadulterated picture of a North American Indian. Unlike the majority of his tribe, he scorned all European dress. The upper part of his body was naked. A buffalo hide was wound around his hips. Yellow copper rings decorated his arms and a string of beads hung from his neck. With his long, straight black hair hanging down, he sat there with the earnest (to the European almost apathetic) expression of countenance of the North American savage. He drew special attention to himself because in previous years, he had distinguished himself for daring and bravery in many engagements with the Texans.

Santa Anna became a proponent of accommodation and peace with the Whites following his involvement with treaty talks with the U.S. Army. In early December 1847, Santa Anna and a party of chiefs from several tribes in Texas visited Washington, DC. The first of his tribe to make such a journey, Santa Anna was recorded to be overwhelmed by what he saw, especially the sheer numbers of the Whites. From that moment on, convinced that continued armed resistance against the United States was tantamount to suicide for his people, he began advocating accommodation and attempted to use his prestige as a noted war chief to secure a lasting peace, but among the still-warlike Comanche, Santa Anna's conversion reduced his prestige.

== Death and legacy ==
Santa Anna apparently tired of his reduced position, and to regain his former glory, he led several raids into Mexico in 1848–49. These raids necessitated intervention by the Army and United States Indian agent Robert S. Neighbors, and Santa Anna was persuaded to halt the raids. In late December 1849, a cholera epidemic killed over 300 Penateka Comanche in a few weeks' time. Santa Anna was one of the victims, though Buffalo Hump, also ill, and Yellow Wolf survived. Following Santa Anna's death, those in the Penateka tribe, other than the division commanded by Buffalo Hump, disintegrated. Its surviving members joined other Comanche tribes.
