= Great Raid of 1840 =

Largest raid mounted by Native Americans on white cities, now the US

- Part of the Indian Wars
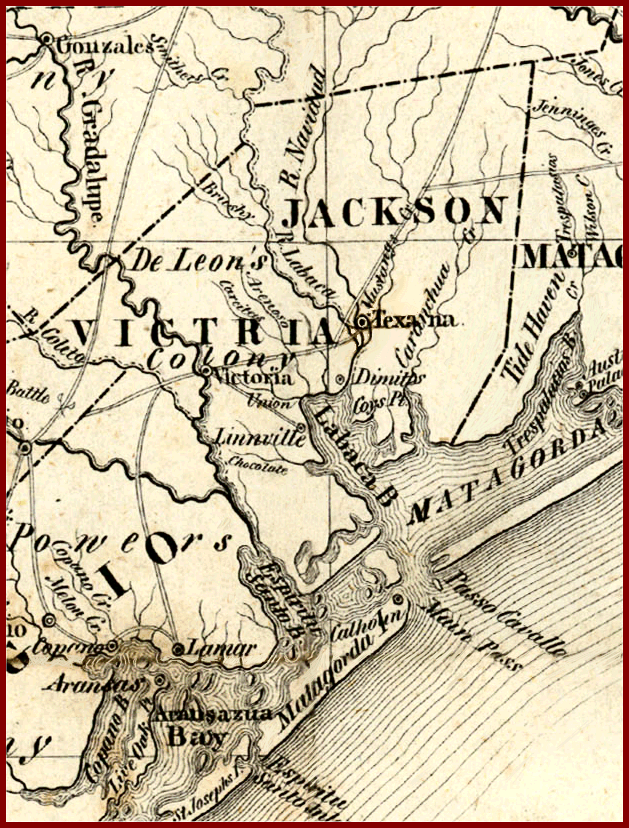
- Location of Linville and Victoria
Date	August 7, 1840
Location	Victoria and Linnville, Texas
Result	Comanche victory

Belligerents
Texians	Comanche

Commanders and leaders
Mathew Caldwell, Edward Burleson	Buffalo Hump

Strength
Approximately 100	Unknown; estimates, c. 400

Casualties and losses
20 civilians killed	35 killed, 29 caught and imprisoned

Great Raid of 1840
- Location: 28°40′06″N 96°38′19″W; Linnville Calhoun County, Texas
- Date: August 7, 1840 (UTC-6)
- Attack type: Raid on a frontier settlement
- Deaths: 23 either killed or carried away
- Perpetrator: Comanche

The Great Raid of 1840 was the largest raid Native Americans ever mounted on white cities in what is now the United States. It followed the Council House Fight, in which Republic of Texas officials attempted to capture and take prisoner 33 Comanche chiefs and their wives, who had earlier promised to deliver 13 white captives they had kidnapped. Because of the small amount this Penateka band of Southern Comanche received for the ransom of nine-year-old James Putnam weeks before, they brought with them only one captive, 16-year-old Matilda Lockhart. Just as they had done to Mexicans and Santa Feans for nearly a century, the Penateka wanted to ensure they would receive a higher payment before ransoming the other whites they had abducted. This tactic, together with the terrible treatment they had given Lockhart, backfired, and the Indians found themselves taken hostage for a prisoner exchange. An attempt to escape followed by the brandishing of tomahawks the Comanche had secreted between their wives' blankets led to the massacre of all the male Indians except two elderly men, who along with the women were taken hostage.

In response to the killings and hostage-taking, the southern Comanche, led by chief Buffalo Hump, raised a huge war party of many of the bands of the Comanche, and raided deep into white-settled areas of Southeast Texas, stealing horses and taking more white captives.

== Buffalo Hump gathers the tribes ==
Penateka first war chief Buffalo Hump was determined to do more than merely complain about what the Comanches viewed as a bitter betrayal. Spreading word to the other bands of Comanches that he was raiding the white settlements in revenge, Buffalo Hump led the Great Raid of 1840. Buffalo Hump, Penateka second war chief Yellow Wolf, Penateka third war chief Santa Anna, and Isimanica gathered at least 400 warriors, with (maybe 500) wives and young boys along to provide comfort and do work and, in the summer, raided the settlements between Bastrop and San Antonio. In mid-July they were ready and Comanches from every division (Nokoni, Kotsoteka, Yamparika and Kwahadi) were roaming through Texas. Altogether as many as 1,000 Comanche may have set out from West Texas on the Great Raid. On this raid the Comanches went all the way from the plains of west Texas to the cities of Victoria and Linnville on the Texas coast. In what may have been the largest organized raid by the Comanches to that point, they raided and burned these towns and plundered at will.

The northern Comanche did not participate in the raid. They were on their own raid into Mexico, stealing and kidnapping Mexican boys to act as their herders for subsequent raids. Before returning, they attacked the Lipan Apache and Tonkawa.

== Victoria ==
The huge war party crossed into central Texas and first attacked Victoria, on August 6, 1840. Although rangers had found the tracks of a gigantic war party coming out of West Texas and were shadowing the onrushing Comanches, part of the war party broke off and attacked Victoria before citizens could be warned. One resident wrote, "We of Victoria were startled by the apparitions presented by the sudden appearance of six hundred mounted Comanches in the immediate outskirts of the village." Victoria's citizens hid in buildings, and the Comanches, after killing a dozen or so townspeople and riding up and down, departed when rifle fire from the buildings began to make the riding dangerous. The war party intended to gather horses and loot the coastal towns, which were not as prepared for the Comanches as the central Texas cities. After the attack on Victoria, the Comanches camped for the night on nearby Spring Creek.

== The sack of Linnville ==
Location within Texas

On August 7, the Comanches continued on toward Linnville, camping for the night on Placido (now Placedo) Creek on the ranch of Plácido Benavides, about 12 miles from Linnville.

Early on August 8, the Comanches surrounded Linnville, the Republic of Texas's second-largest port at the time, and began pillaging stores and houses. Linnville, of which nothing remains, was 3.5 miles northeast of present-day Port Lavaca. The Comanches reportedly killed three whites, including customs officer Hugh Oran Watts, who had delayed his escape to retrieve a gold watch at his home (reportedly a family heirloom). After killing Watts, the Comanche captured his wife of only three weeks, the former Juliet Constance, and a black woman and child.

Realizing that the plains Indians had no experience on water, the townspeople fled the Comanche raiders to the water. They were saved by remaining aboard small boats and a schooner captained by William G. Marshall, which was at anchor in the bay. In the water, the refugees witnessed the destruction and looting of Linnville, unable to do anything but curse the raiders.

For that entire day the Comanches plundered and burned buildings, draping themselves grandly in top hats and stolen linens. They tied feather beds and bolts of cloth to their horses, and dragged them. They herded cattle into pens and slaughtered them. One outraged citizen, Judge John Hays, grabbed a gun, waded ashore through the shallow water, and roared at the warriors, but they chose to spare him, believing him mad. He later found that he had waded ashore to face nearly 1,000 Indians with an unloaded pistol.

At the time of the Great Raid, many trade goods were en route from overseas to New Orleans, Louisiana, to San Antonio, Texas and Austin, Texas; a total inventory valued at over $300,000 was reported to be at Linnville at that moment, including an undisclosed amount of silver bullion. Linn noted that in addition to the cloth and other trade goods usually in his warehouse at that time were several cases of hats and umbrellas belonging to James Robinson, a San Antonio merchant. "These the Indians made free with, and went dashing about the blazing village, amid their screeching squaws and 'little Injuns,' like demons in a drunken saturnalia, with Robinson's hats on their heads and Robinson's umbrellas bobbing about on every side like tipsy young balloons." After loading loot onto pack mules, the raiders began their retreat on the afternoon of August 8.

With between 1,500 and 3,000 horses, two dozen scalps and half a dozen captives, the Comanche returned home in a large, slow procession.

== The Battle of Plum Creek ==
The Rangers had been trailing the war party for some time, unable to engage them because of their sheer numbers. But the three days of looting at Linnville gave the militia and Ranger companies a chance to gather. Volunteers from Gonzales, Texas, under Mathew Caldwell and from Bastrop under Ed Burleson, with all the ranger companies of east and central Texas, moved to intercept the Indians. They made contact at Plum Creek, near the city of Lockhart, Texas, on August 12, 1840. The Comanches, who normally fared about as a fast and deadly light cavalry, were detained considerably by the captives and slower pack mules. The normal Comanche tactic was to ride as fast as possible away from the scene of a victory, but on this occasion they slowed to a gentler pace acceptable to the heavily laden pack mules.

Tonkawa spies and rangers under Captain Henry McCullough brought word of the Comanche's approach and that they were nearing a boggy field on the fore side of Plum Creek which would severely hamper their flight. McCullough requested a charge which was granted by General Felix Houston and all hell broke loose. Hearing the charge, the Comanche immediately turned toward the mountains of Rio Blanco and San Marcos to make their escape but were hampered by their flight. Their women and elderly formed into the center of the caravan and the men took defensive positions. Some of the warriors out in the lead, leapt off their mounts and from behind the trunks of post oaks, began providing cover for their escaping comrades. These sharp shooters aimed at the attacking cavalry’s horses, causing some to fall from their mounts.

With revolvers and swords in hand, these Texian farmers chased the snipers through choking clouds of acrid smoke while the main body attacked the center. The Indians abandoned their immense booty and left the captives behind and made a mad dash to safety - all except for captive, Mrs. Crosby, who, rather than allow her to escape, an Indian skewered her and a black woman with a lance. He or another Indian shot Mrs. Watts with an arrow before speeding away.

"Just as the retreat commenced, I heard the scream of a female voice in a bunch of bushes close by. Approaching the spot, I discovered a lady endeavoring to pull an arrow out that was lodged firmly in her breast. This proved to be Mrs. Watts, whose husband the [Indians] killed at Linville.

The friendly Tonkawa chief, Placido won the admiration of the soldiers. He had arrived on foot but soon mounted a white horse from which a Comanche had been shot and chased the wild Indians. Brown recalled that Placido was six feet two inches, handsomely formed, of majestic bearing, a master in horsemanship and the soul of untutored honor, ashamed of the vices of his tribe he was the favorite with every honest white man who personally knew him. A braver man never walked the soil of Texas."

== Conclusion ==
In their wake, the Comanche left 23 unarmed civilians dead around Lavaca. "The number of Comanches killed, we never ascertained," wrote William B. Dewees upon his return home just days after the fight.

== See also ==
- List of battles won by Indigenous peoples of the Americas
- Buffalo Hump
- Yellow Wolf (Comanche)
- Santa Anna (Comanche war chief)
- Council House Fight
- Battle of Plum Creek
