= Linnville, Calhoun County, Texas =

Town in Calhoun County, Texas, United States

Coordinates: 28.6531°N 96.6346°W

Linnville, Texas was a town in the Republic of Texas, in what is now Calhoun County. It was founded in 1831 and destroyed in the Great Raid of 1840.

Events began with the Council House Fight in San Antonio, March 1840, in which Republic of Texas officials attempted to capture and take prisoner a large number of Comanche chiefs who refused to return Texan captives, killing them together with dozens of their family and followers. Linnville was sacked and burned by the Comanches and the port was never rebuilt. Citizens of Linnville escaped to safety by taking to small boats and a schooner in the waters off the bay, watching as their town was burned to the ground.

The Comanches' August raid on Victoria and Linnville was revenge for the Texans' attack at San Antonio, and it became one in a sequence of strikes and counter-strikes in Republic of Texas history that defined bitter relations between Comanches and Texans.

The Texans retaliated with the Battle of Plum Creek near Lockhart, Texas, attacking the Comanches in their retreat from Linnville. And finally, an expedition commanded by Colonel John Henry Moore against a Penateka Comanche village in their homeland near what is now Colorado City in October 1840 was additional revenge.
