= Mathew Caldwell =

Texas settler (1798–1842)

Matthew Caldwell
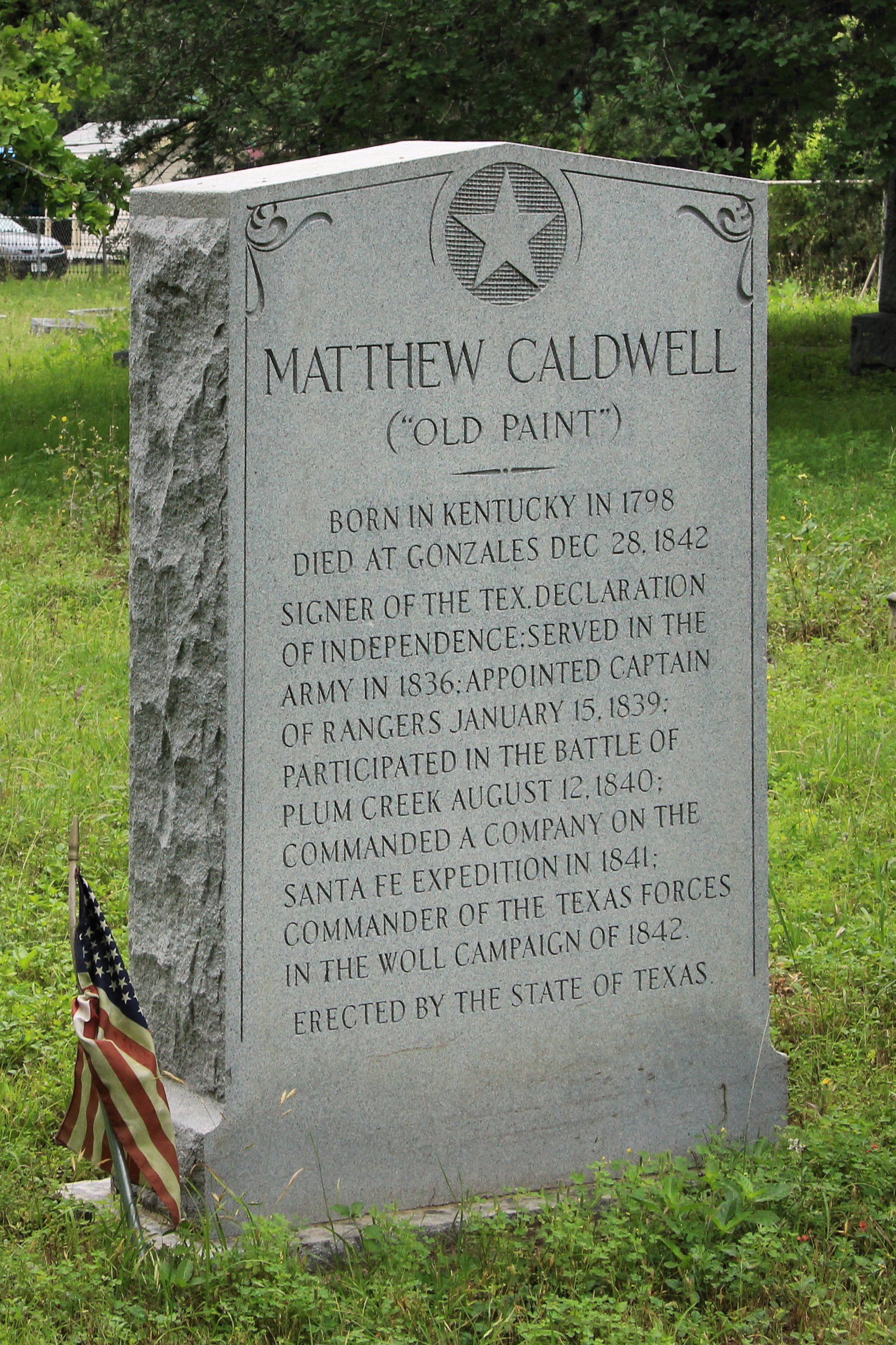
- Monument at the gravesite of Matthew Caldwell.
- Born: March 8, 1798; Kentucky, US
- Died: December 28, 1842 (aged 44); Gonzales, Republic of Texas
- Resting place: Gonzales City Cemetery; 29°30′38.7″N 97°27′0.5″W
- Monuments: 1930 State Grave Monument; 1936 Texas Hall of State Building facade; 1936 Caldwell County centennial pink granite marker; 1976 Caldwell County Courthouse marker
- Spouses: Martha A; Hannah Morrison
- Children: 3

Matthew Caldwell (March 8, 1798 – December 28, 1842), also spelled Mathew Caldwell, was a 19th-century Texas settler, military figure, Captain of the Gonzales – Seguin Rangers and a signer of the Texas Declaration of Independence. Because of his recruitment ride ahead of the Battle of Gonzales, some call him the Paul Revere of Texas.

== Early life and family ==
Matthew Caldwell, nicknamed "Old Paint", was born in Kentucky on March 8, 1798. He moved to Missouri with his family in 1818, where he traded, fought, and learned the ways of the Indigenous peoples of the Americas. Caldwell, his wife, and his family arrived in Texas in the Green DeWitt Colony on February 20, 1831. On June 22, 1831, he received the title to a parcel of land near the Zumwalt Settlement, southwest of current Hallettsville, Texas. Settling in Gonzales, Caldwell acquired the original James Hinds residence on Water Street and soon became a person of notoriety, involved in security and command of minutemen rangers in Gonzales and the surrounding areas.

== Texas Revolution ==
Actively recruiting before the battle of Gonzales in October 1835, Caldwell rode from Gonzales to Mina, informing colonists of the dire need for their support in the volunteer army. Because of this, some call him the Paul Revere of Texas. As a participant at the battle, he served as a scout and mediator. On November 3, 1835, the delegates of the citizens of Texas established the provisional Texas government by the Consultation of 1835. The Consultation authorized the recruitment of 25 Rangers, and later, was increased to three companies of 56 men each. Caldwell was appointed a subcontractor to the Texian Army by the Provisional Government of Texas to supply and administer a volunteer army at the siege of Bexar and the Alamo.

On February 1, 1836, he and John Fisher were elected delegates from Gonzales to the Texas Independence Convention of 1836 at Washington on the Brazos. Both signed the Texas Declaration of Independence on March 2. The convention appointed a committee of three, of which Caldwell was a member, to assess the situation of the enemy on the frontier and the condition of the Texian army. They dispatched couriers with the message of independence. Caldwell went along with them, paying close attention to the state of the new republic as they passed through numerous settlements.

On February 4, 1836, Matthew Caldwell, along with Byrd Lockhart and William A. Matthews, were commissioners to raise a group of volunteers for a Gonzales Ranging Company. The company was mustered by March 23, 1836. After the call for reinforcements from Lt. Col. William B. Travis by courier Captain Albert Martin on February 25, Lt. George C. Kimble responded on the 27th with twelve original rangers. Twenty more men joined on their ride to the Alamo.

== 1836 Alamo relief force ==
The Gonzales Ranging Company of Mounted Volunteers company primarily consisted of family men from Gonzales and DeWitt's Colony, gathering after the call for support was issued. After receiving Travis's "To the People of Texas and All Americans in the World" appeal on February 25, the Gonzales Rangers departed the town of Gonzales on the evening of Saturday, February 27, led by commanding officer Lieutenant George C. Kimble and Captain Albert Martin, the Alamo courier delivering Travis's appeal at Gonzales. Of the twenty-three original members mustered into the Gonzales Ranger Company on the 23rd, a total of twelve are thought to have entered the Alamo with the final Relief Force on March 1, and all but one died there. Lockhart, Sowell, John William Smith and others accompanied the thirty-two Rangers into the Alamo and later departed, at night, as other couriers left.

According to one account, a group of twenty-five men left Gonzales at two in the evening on the 27th. As they passed through Green Dewitt's Colony toward the Umphries Branch community and on to the Cibolo Creek, the company gained eight more members, increasing the company to thirty-two men. The youngest member of the Alamo defenders, William Philip King, 15 years old, became a part of this group. Due to family illness, he substituted in his father's place. On the 29th, the group searched to find a way into the Alamo and through the Mexican lines. At three o'clock, in the early hours of March 1, they made a wild dash into the fort while shot at by Alamo sentries. One man was slightly wounded, and after a few rash words, the Alamo gates flew open for the Gonzales force to enter.

Knowing their chance of survival was slim, the Gonzales Rangers remained in the Alamo, possibly the only reinforcements to make it into the Alamo during the siege. The 1836 Gonzales Ranging Company of Mounted Volunteers all perished in the battle of the Alamo. For their efforts to support the besieged and outnumbered Texians, they are remembered as the "Immortal Thirty-Two".

== Republic years ==
In the third quarter of 1837, settlers returned to Gonzales after the revolution. Nothing remained of the former town except one charred building. The Comanche re-established their claim to the area. Caldwell served as the first Law Enforcement Official or Sheriff of Gonzales (Guadalupe, Dewitt, Caldwell, Lavaca) County.

In 1838, he and his fellow rangers founded the town of Walnut Branch in sparsely populated northwest Gonzales County. The area was well-favored, and was frequently DeWitt ranger campground years before the revolution.

Caldwell formed a frontier ranger company of twenty-nine men. Charles Lockhart became First Lieutenant, and Robert Hall joined as his Second Lieutenant. They built a log fort to provide security for the residents and only mustered for a real crisis. In October that year, Native Americans raided the town, and stole two young women and some children, The rangers pursued the group, but could not catch them. They allied with friendly Native Americans and valued their support.

Rumors of a Mexican retaliation soon flourished, and Texas President Mirabeau B. Lamar appointed Caldwell as a captain on January 15, 1839, to recruit a company of Gonzales Rangers to defend the Texas frontier. Two months later, he had his company of rangers, and on March 23, 1839, Caldwell became captain of a company in the First Regiment of Infantry of Texas. On March 29, 1839, a company of eighty men commanded by General Edward Burleson defeated Vicente Córdova and his rebels during a fight near Seguin, Texas, at "Battleground Prairie". Córdova survived but was pursued by Caldwell's Rangers and Seguin militia and then joined by members of the Henry Karnes company, ensuring his departure from Texas.

Native Americans continued to plague the new republic, and in March, Caldwell participated in a meeting to trade captives with the Comanches. However, participants in the meeting turned violent, and the Council House Fight erupted, where he was wounded. He recovered to lead a company at the battle of Plum Creek on August 12, 1840.

As captain of Company D of the scouting force in the Texan Santa Fe Expedition in 1841, he was captured with other members and imprisoned in Mexico. After the Mexicans released him, he headed to San Antonio to confront the invading Mexican forces there.

On September 18, 1842, Caldwell commanded a force of 200 men from Gonzales, Seguin, San Antonio and other near settlements, confronting and defeating General Adrián Woll, at the battle of Salado Creek.

== Personal life and death ==
In 1826, when he was 28, Caldwell married Martha A, and they had three children. Martha died about 1833 in Gonzales, TX.

Their three children:

- Curtis (1827)
- Lucy Ann (1829–1906)
- Martha Elizabeth (1831–1892)

Caldwell married Hannah Morrison in Washington County, Texas, on March 16, 1838. He died on December 28, 1842, aged 44, in his home in Gonzales, and was buried with honors as a military hero.

== Legacy ==
Caldwell County, Texas was established in 1848 and named for him. In 1930, the state of Texas honored him with a monument at his grave at Gonzales. The 1936 Texas Hall of State Building, in Dallas, commemorates Caldwell on the exterior historical-figure frieze.

== See also ==
- Timeline of the Republic of Texas
- Córdova Rebellion
- Council House Fight
- Great Raid of 1840
- Battle of Plum Creek

== Citations ==
- Caldwell, Cliff (2011), Texas Lawmen, 1835–1899: The Good and the Bad by Cliff Caldwell and Ron DeLord, Charleston, SC: The History Press, ISBN 978-1-60949-216-8
- Edmondson, J.R. (2000), The Alamo Story-From History to Current Conflicts, Plano, TX: Republic of Texas Press, ISBN 1-55622-678-0
- Groneman, Bill (1990), Alamo Defenders: A Genealogy, the People and Their Words, Austin, TX: Eakin Press, ISBN 978-0-89015-757-2
- Hardin and "Brazos", Stephen L. (1992), Life of Robert Hall, Austin, TX: State House Press, ISBN 0938349902
- Hardin, Stephen L. (1994), Texian Iliad – A Military History of the Texas Revolution, Austin, TX: University of Texas Press, ISBN 0-292-73086-1, OCLC 29704011
- Lindley, Thomas Ricks (2003), Alamo Traces: New Evidence and New Conclusions, Lanham, MD: Republic of Texas Press, ISBN 1-55622-983-6
- Moore, Stephen L. (2006), Savage Frontier: Rangers, Riflemen, and Indian Wars in Texas, Volume II, 1838–1839, Denton, TX: University of North Texas Press, ISBN 978-1-57441-206-2
- Todish, Timothy J.; Todish, Terry; Spring, Ted (1998), Alamo Sourcebook, 1836: A Comprehensive Guide to the Battle of the Alamo and the Texas Revolution, Austin, TX: Eakin Press, ISBN 978-1-57168-152-2
- Dahlqvist, Rasmus (2013), From Martin to Despallier: The Story of a French Colonial Family, North Charleston, SC: CreateSpace IPP, ISBN 978-1-49360-325-1
