= Rupert N. Richardson =

American academic administrator and historian

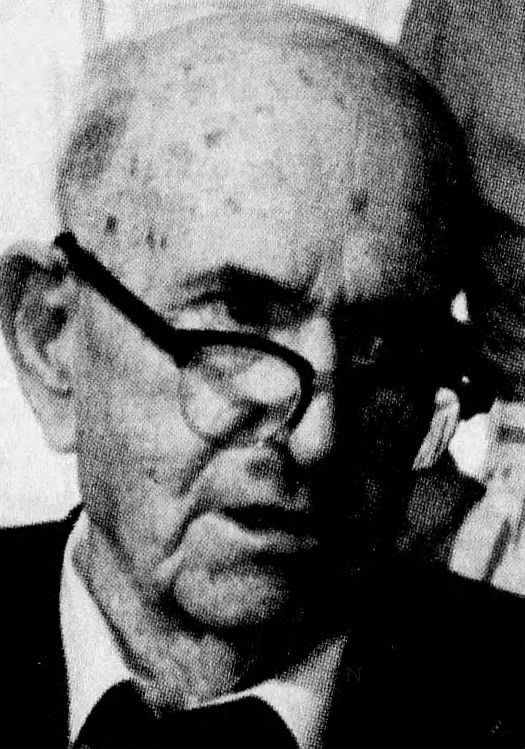
- Richardson in 1986

President of Hardin–Simmons University
- In office 1943–1953
- Preceded by: William R. White
- Succeeded by: Evan Allard Reiff

Personal details
- Born: Rupert Novel Richardson; April 28, 1891 Caddo, Texas, U.S.
- Died: April 14, 1988 (aged 96) Abilene, Texas, U.S.
- Education: Hardin–Simmons University; University of Chicago; University of Texas at Austin
- Occupation: Academic administrator, historian

Rupert Novel Richardson (April 28, 1891 – April 14, 1988) was an American academic administrator and historian. He served as president of Hardin–Simmons University, a private university in Abilene, Texas, from 1943 to 1953.

== Life and career ==
Richardson was born in Caddo, Texas, the son of Willis Baker Richardson and Nannie Coon. He attended Hardin–Simmons University, earning his BA degree in 1912. He also attended the University of Chicago, earning his BS degree in 1914. After earning his degrees, he worked as a principal at Cisco High School from 1915 to 1916, and at Sweetwater High School from 1916 to 1917. He briefly served as a lieutenant in the United States Army during World War I. After his discharge, he attended the University of Texas at Austin, earning his MA degree in 1922 and his PhD degree in 1928.

In 1943, Richardson wrote the textbook Texas: The Lone Star State. He served as a distinguished professor in the department of history, and as president of Hardin–Simmons University, a private university in Abilene, Texas, from 1943 to 1953.

== Death ==
Richardson died at the Hendrick Medical Retirement Center in Abilene, Texas on April 14, 1988, at the age of 96.
