= Council House Fight =

1840 battle of the Texas–Indian wars

- Part of Texas–Indian Wars
- The Plaza and the Council House in San Antonio
Date	March 19, 1840
Location	San Antonio, Republic of Texas
Result	Entire Comanche peace delegation killed

Belligerents
Texas Rangers and Texas Militia	Comanche

Commanders and leaders
Hugh McLeod; George Thomas Howard; Mathew Caldwell (WIA)	Muk-wah-ruh †

Strength
Approximately 100	33 chiefs and warriors, and 32 family members and/or retainers

Casualties and losses
7 killed 10 wounded (most from friendly fire)	35 killed 29 captured and imprisoned

The Council House Fight, often referred to as the Council House Massacre, was a fight between soldiers and officials of the Republic of Texas and a delegation of Comanche chiefs during a peace conference in San Antonio on March 19, 1840. The meeting took place under an observed truce with the purpose of negotiating the exchange of captives and ultimately facilitating peace after two years of war. The Comanches sought to obtain recognition of the boundaries of the Comancheria, their homeland, while the Texians wanted the release of Texian and Mexican citizens held prisoner by the Comanches.

The council ended with 12 Comanche leaders shot to death inside the Council House, 23 others shot in the streets of San Antonio, and 30 taken captive. The Comanche tortured 13 captives to death in response. The incident ended any chance for peace and led to years of further hostility and war.

== Background ==
At the time, the Comanche people were not a unified Indian nation. There were at least 12 divisions of the Comanche, with as many as 35 independent roaming bands, also known as rancherías or villages. Although bound together in various ways, both cultural and political, the bands were not responsible to any formalized unified authority.

The absence of a central authority meant that one band could not force another band to return their captives. Chiefs Buffalo Hump and Peta Nocona never agreed to return any captives to the Texian settlers.

On January 10, 1840, after several years of war against the Apache, as well as constant depredations and murders of white emigrant settlers and a major smallpox epidemic, three Comanche emissaries were told that peace would be entertained if they returned the dozen white captives and dozen Mexican captives. Several Comanche bands thus entered San Antonio and asked for peace, offering to send a large contingent of their leaders in 23 days to secure a new peace. But only one white boy was returned as a bargaining chip. Colonel Henry Wax Karnes received them, listened to their story, and agreed, but admonished them by saying that a lasting peace could be negotiated only when the Comanches gave up the captives that they held, estimated at thirteen. Albert Sidney Johnston, the Texas Secretary of War, had ordered San Antonio officials to take the Comanche delegates as hostages if they failed to deliver all captives. In March, Muguara, a powerful eastern Comanche chief, led 65 Comanches, including women and children, to San Antonio for peace talks.

== Killing of the peace delegates ==
The Comanches arrived in San Antonio on March 19. Hoping to bargain for an exchange of captives, the 12 chiefs brought women and children as well as warriors. They were dressed in finery with their faces painted. The delegation had hoped to negotiate a recognition of the Comancheria as the sovereign land of the Comanche. Among the chiefs who did not attend were Buffalo Hump, the Comanche war chief who would lead the Great Raid of 1840 in retaliation for the killings, and the other two principal Penateka war chiefs, Yellow Wolf, his cousin and alter-ego, and Santa Anna, who sided with him in leading the raid.

Contrary to the expectations of the Texians who—oblivious to the fractionalized structure of independent Comanche bands—had demanded a return of all white captives held in all Comanche bands, the attending Comanche chiefs brought only one white captive. The white captive was Matilda Lockhart, a 16-year-old girl, captured at age 14 while picking pecans with her cousins, the Putnams. She had been sold to several Indian men. Mary Maverick, who helped care for the girl, wrote almost sixty years after the event that Lockhart had been beaten, sexually assaulted and had suffered burns to her body. Miss Lockhart "[w]as utterly degraded, and could not hold up her head again. Her head, arms, and face were full of bruises, and sores, and her nose actually burnt off to the bone-all the fleshy end gone, and a great scab formed on the end of the bone. Both nostrils were wide open and denuded of flesh. She told a piteous tale of how dreadfully the Indians had beaten her, and how they would wake her from her sleep by sticking a chunk of fire to her flesh, especially to her nose...her body had many scars from the fire".

By contrast, Colonel Hugh McLeod did not mention any abuse in his after action report of March 20, 1840 (commenting on the intelligence of the girl but nothing like a missing nose), and neither did any other Texas officials at the time, nor Matilda Lockhart's own sister-in-law in a letter written to her mother shortly after the release. Anderson writes: "While published in the 1890s, this description has been used by historians to claim that the massacre came about as a result of the justifiable rage of Texas men. Yet none of the Texas officials claimed this to be the case at the time; evidence of abuse is conspicuously missing in the primary documents. Maverick may have exaggerated Lockhart's condition because of the growing criticism of Texas in the American and European Press. The most significant source on Matilda's condition is a brief statement made in a letter by her sister-in-law, Catherine Lockhart, who was in San Antonio. Catherine describes Matilda's release but says nothing of abuse."

Asked about the thirteen kidnapped whites expected to be ransomed as part of the peace negotiations, Matilda informed the Texians that she knew of the existence of Mrs. Dolly Wester, her children, Booker Webster, Patsy Webster, Thomas Pierce, a child named Lyons, and four Putnam children. According to Dolly Webster, the Comanche, wanting to obtain the highest price per captive, decided to ransom on one or two at a time. The Texians believed this was against the conditions for the negotiations, which they insisted had specified that all abducted whites had to be released before the council. The Comanche, of course, had a different view, since the chiefs and bands not in attendance were under no obligation to release anyone, as they had never agreed to a council.

Because the delegation did not bring the expected number of captives, the members were taken to the local jail. The talks were held at the Council House, a one-story stone building adjoining the jail on the corner of Main Plaza and Calabosa (Market) Street. During the council, the Comanche warriors sat on the floor, as was their custom, while the Texians sat on chairs on a platform facing them. Lockhart had informed the Texians that she had seen 15 other prisoners at the Comanches' principal camp several days before. She reported the Indians had wanted to see how high a price they could get for her, and based on that information, planned to bring in the remaining captives one at a time to maximize their return.

The Texians demanded to know where the other captives were. The Penateka spokesman, Chief Muguara, responded that the other prisoners were held by various other bands of Comanche. He assured the Texians that he felt the other captives would be able to be ransomed, but that it would be in exchange for a great deal of supplies, including ammunition and blankets. He then finished his speech with the comment "How do you like that answer?" The Texian militia entered the courtroom and positioned themselves at intervals along the walls. When the Comanches would not, or could not, promise to return all captives immediately, the Texas officials said that the chiefs would be held hostage until the white captives were released.

The interpreter warned the Texian officials that if he delivered this message the Comanches would attempt to escape by fighting. He was instructed to relay the message anyway and left the room as soon as he finished translating. After learning that they were being held hostage, the Comanches attempted to fight their way out of the Council House using arrows and knives. The Texian soldiers opened fire at point-blank range, killing both Indians and whites. The Comanche women and children waiting outdoors began shooting arrows at white people after hearing the commotion inside. At least one Texian spectator was killed. When a small number of warriors managed to escape from the Council House, all of the Comanche began to flee. The soldiers who pursued them again opened fire, killing and wounding both Comanche and Texians.

The report by Col. Hugh McLeod written March 20, 1840 claimed that of the 65 members of the Comanches' party, 35 were killed (30 adult males, 3 women, and 2 children), 29 were taken prisoner (27 women and children, and 2 old men), and 1 departed unobserved (described as a renegade Mexican). Seven Texians died, including a judge, a sheriff, and an army lieutenant, with ten more wounded.

A German surgeon surnamed Weidman helped to treat the citizens who had been wounded in the fight. Weidman was also a naturalist and had been assigned by the Tsar of Russia to make scientific observations about Texas and its inhabitants. Two days after the battle, San Antonio residents discovered that Weidman had decided to take the heads and bodies of two Indians to Russia. To obtain the skeletons, he had boiled the bodies in water, and dumped the resulting liquid into the San Antonio drinking water supply.

== Captives ==
The day after the fight, a single Comanche woman was released to return to her camp and report that the Comanche prisoners would be released if the Comanche released the 15 Americans and several Mexicans who were known to be captives. They were given 12 days to return the captives. On March 26, a white woman, Mrs. John Webster, came into town with her three-year-old. She had been a Comanche captive for 19 months and had just escaped, leaving her 12-year-old son with the Indians. Two days later, a band of Indians returned to San Antonio. Leaving the bulk of the warriors outside the city, Chief Isanaica (Howling Wolf) and one other man rode into San Antonio and yelled insults. The citizens told him to go find the soldiers if he wanted a fight, but the garrison commander, Captain Redd, declared that he had to observe the 12-day truce. Redd invited the Indians to come back in three days, but, fearing a trap, Isanaica and his men left the area. Another officer accused Redd of cowardice for refusing to fight, and they both died following a duel over the insult.

Of the 16 hostages the Texians were determined to recover, 13 were tortured to death as soon as the news of the Council House Fight reached the outraged Comanches. The captives, including Matilda Lockhart's six-year-old sister, suffered slow roasting among other tortures. Only three captives who had been adopted into the tribe, and by Comanche custom were truly part of the tribe, were spared. This was part of the Comanche answer to the breaking of a truce.

On April 3, when the truce deadline had ended, another band of Comanches appeared again to bargain for a captive exchange. They had only three captives with them, including Webster's son Booker, a five-year-old girl, and a Mexican boy. Booker told them that the other captives had been tortured and killed when the Comanche woman had returned to camp with news of the Council House Fight. These three captives were returned after their adoptive families agreed to give them up.

The Comanche captives were moved from the city jail to the San Jose Mission, then to Camp Cooke at the head of the San Antonio River. Several were taken into people's homes to live and work, but ran away as soon as they could. Eventually, all of the Texians' Comanche captives escaped.

== Aftermath ==
The Comanche were shocked by the actions of the Texians. In his book Los Comanches, historian Stanley Noyes notes, "[a] violation of a council represented an almost unthinkable degree of perfidy. The council was sacred not only to the [Comanche] People, but [also] to all Native Americans". In response, the captives the Texians sought were killed, and Buffalo Hump launched the Great Raid of 1840, leading hundreds of Comanche warriors on raids against many Texian villages. The Texians, for their part, were shocked and disgusted by the actions of the Comanches in torturing to death the innocent captives. At least 25 settlers were killed in the Great Raid, with others taken prisoner, including a Mrs. Crosby, a granddaughter of Daniel Boone, who was later murdered by her captors. Hundreds of thousands of dollars worth of goods were taken; one city was burned to the ground and another damaged. The Texian militia responded, leading to the Battle of Plum Creek in August 1840, and ultimately stopped the raids.

== See also ==
- Timeline of the Republic of Texas
- Mathew Caldwell

== Sources ==
=== Online sources ===
- First person descriptions of the Council House Fight of 1840.
- Facsimile of Col. Hugh McLeod's report.

=== Bibliography ===
- Bial, Raymond. Lifeways: The Comanche. New York: Benchmark Books, 2000.
- "Comanche" Skyhawks Native American Dedication (August 15, 2005)
- "Comanche" on the History Channel (August 26, 2005)
- Dunnegan, Ted. Ted's Arrowheads and Artifacts from the Comancheria (August 19, 2005)
- Fehrenbach, Theodore Reed The Comanches: The Destruction of a People. New York: Knopf, 1974, ISBN 0-394-48856-3. Later (2003) republished under the title The Comanches: The History of a People
- Foster, Morris. Being Comanche.
- Frazier, Ian. Great Plains. New York: Farrar, Straus, and Giroux, 1989.
- John, Elizabeth and A.H. Storms Brewed in Other Men's Worlds: The Confrontation of the Indian, Spanish, and French in the Southwest, 1540–1795. College Station, TX: Texas A&M Press, 1975.
- Jones, David E. Sanapia: Comanche Medicine Woman. New York: Holt, Rinehart and Winston, 1974.
- Lodge, Sally. Native American People: The Comanche. Vero Beach, Florida 32964: Rourke Publications, Inc., 1992.
- Lund, Bill. Native Peoples: The Comanche Indians. Mankato, Minnesota: Bridgestone Books, 1997.
- Mooney, Martin. The Junior Library of American Indians: The Comanche Indians. New York: Chelsea House Publishers, 1993.
- Native Americans: Comanche (August 13, 2005).
- Richardson, Rupert N. The Comanche Barrier to South Plains Settlement: A Century and a Half of Savage Resistance to the Advancing White Frontier. Glendale, CA: Arthur H. Clark Company, 1933.
- Rollings, Willard. Indians of North America: The Comanche. New York: Chelsea House Publishers, 1989.
- Secoy, Frank. Changing Military Patterns on the Great Plains. Monograph of the American Ethnological Society, No. 21. Locust Valley, NY: J. J. Augustin, 1953.
- Streissguth, Thomas. Indigenous Peoples of North America: The Comanche. San Diego: Lucent Books Incorporation, 2000.
- "The Texas Comanches" on Texas Indians (August 14, 2005).
- Wallace, Ernest, and E. Adamson Hoebel. The Comanches: Lords of the Southern Plains. Norman: University of Oklahoma Press, 1952.
