= Rachel Plummer =

American writer (1819–1839)

Rachel Parker Plummer (March 22, 1819 – March 19, 1839) was the daughter of James W. Parker and the cousin of Quanah Parker, the last free-roaming chief of the Comanches. An Anglo-Texan woman, she was kidnapped at the age of seventeen, along with her son, James Pratt Plummer, age two, and her cousins, by a Comanche raiding party.

Plummer's 21 months among the Comanche as a prisoner became widely known when she wrote a book about her captivity, Rachael Plummer's Narrative of Twenty One Months' Servitude as a Prisoner Among the Commanchee Indians, which was issued in Houston in 1838. This was the first narrative about a captive of Texas Indians published in the Republic of Texas, and it became an international sensation. After Plummer's death, her father published a revised edition of her book in 1844 as an appendix to his Narrative of the Perilous Adventures, Miraculous Escapes and Sufferings of Rev. James W. Parker. Her book is considered an invaluable look at Comanche culture before environmental destruction, disease, starvation, and war forced them onto reservations.

== Birth and early years ==
Rachel Parker was born in 1819 in Crawford County, Illinois^{1}, the second youngest living child of James William Parker (1797–1864) and Martha Duty, and spent most of her youth in Illinois. She had two living siblings, and three siblings who had died at an early age. In 1834, her family and allied families, led by her father James and uncle Silas, moved from Illinois to Texas, along with other sons of Elder John Parker (1758–1836) and Sarah White, as part of the large Parker family.

At age 14, socially considered an adult woman and described by her father in his later book as a "red haired beauty of rare courage and intelligence," Rachel Parker married Luther M. Plummer. She moved with the Parker family in 1830 to Conway County, Arkansas, which her father used as a staging ground for exploratory trips to Texas. In 1832 her father proposed to Stephen F. Austin that the Parkers be permitted to settle 50 families north of the Little Brazos River, in what was considered part of the Comancheria. One of the 50 families was that of Plummer and her husband. Austin did not reply to this proposal. James Parker was the first of the Parkers to come to Texas, and his persistence led to his being given a league of land north of the site of present Groesbeck on April 1, 1835. Luther Plummer was also awarded a league of land by his father-in-law's persistent entreaties to the Mexican Government.

== Establishment in Texas ==
Plummer and her husband joined other Parker family members, including her father James, her uncles Silas and Benjamin, and their families, in moving to Texas. Daniel Parker, another uncle of hers, was already in Texas, though not with the other Parkers. The Parker clan led by James, including the Plummer family, moved to their land grant, and built Fort Parker at the headwaters of the Navasota River. It was completed in March 1834, before they had been legally awarded the land on which it was built. Plummer's grandfather, Elder John Parker, then joined them, with his second wife, Sarah Pinson Duty. Fort Parker's 12-foot (4 m) high pointed log walls enclosed 4 acres (16,000 m^{2}). Blockhouses were placed on two corners for lookouts and to make defense of the fort possible. Six cabins were attached to the inside walls. The fort had one large gate facing south, and a small rear gate for easy access to the spring waters.

Though the families in the Parker group were beginning to build cabins outside the Fort, most still slept inside for protection. Elder John Parker had negotiated treaties with local Indian chiefs, and believed they would protect the little colony. Luther Plummer believed his family was safe, but his father-in-law, James Parker, who was aware that the Comanche were not a unified "tribe" as the Europeans understood such, but a group of bands and divisions united by common cultural ties, was less certain. His brother Silas had raised, and become Captain, of a local Ranger company, which James felt could attract the anger of Indians who felt abused by the Rangers.

== Fort Parker Massacre ==
On May 19, 1836, at sunrise, Plummer, three months pregnant with her second child, was in the fort caring for her 2-year-old firstborn son, James Pratt Plummer, the first child born to the family in Texas, while several men, including her husband and father, were working in the fields.

In her memoir, Plummer wrote that "one minute the fields (in front of the fort) were clear, and the next moment, more Indians than I dreamed possible were in front of the fort." As the Parkers debated what to do, one of the Indians approached the fort with a white flag. None of them believed the flag was genuine, but Benjamin Parker believed it gave the family a chance for most of them to escape. With his father's approval, he decided to go out to try to delay the Indians while the family escaped.

As the other women and children were leaving, Plummer chose to stay in the fort out of fear that she and her son would not be able to keep up. After Benjamin Parker returned from his first talks with the Indians and warned them that they would likely all die, Plummer wanted to flee, but Silas told her to watch the front gate while he ran for his musket and powder pouch. "They will kill Benjamin," she reported her Uncle Silas saying, "and then me, but I will do for at least one of them, by God." At that moment, she said she heard whooping outside the fort, and then Indians were inside. She then ran, holding her son's hand, while behind her she said she saw Indians stabbing Benjamin with their lances.

Plummer was then seized by mounted warriors who threw her up behind them, and she watched another seize her son. She witnessed her grandfather's torture and murder and her grandmother's rape. Her cousins Cynthia Ann Parker and John Richard Parker as well as her aunt Elizabeth Kellogg were also captured. All five of the men present in the fort that morning were killed. After the war party stopped that night, they performed a ritual scalp dance, whipped their captives, and then stripped Kellogg and Plummer naked and tortured and raped them. Plummer never directly addressed the subject of rape in her book, only commenting that:

To undertake to narrate their barbarous treatment would only add to my present distress, for it is with feelings of the deepest mortification that I think of it, much less to speak or write of it.

Plummer did, however, write candidly about the culture and psyche of the Comanche.

== Captivity among the Comanche ==
Plummer's book is considered an invaluable glimpse into the culture and mindset of the Comanche as a people before disease and war forced them onto reservations. She not only recounted her feelings about her captivity, but detailed the life, lifestyle, and as much as she could, the mindset of the Comanche. She detailed the roles men, women, children, and temporary captives, or slaves, played in that society, and why. In her account of her life among the Comanche, Rachel wrote that six weeks after giving birth to a healthy son, the warriors decided she was slowed too much by childcare, and threw her son down on the ground. When he stopped moving, they left her to bury him. When she revived him, they returned and tied the infant to a rope, and dragged him through cactuses until the frail, tiny body was literally torn to pieces.

In the meantime, her father, James Parker, was searching frantically for her. Rachel wrote that she had never seen open space the size of the Great Plains, and her travels with the Comanche took her to what her father later thought was Colorado in the northernmost part of the Comancheria. She attended a giant meeting of all divisions and bands of the Comanche, their allies the Kiowa and the Kiowa Apache, while the tribes considered whether to drive the Texans completely from the Comancheria, and conquer Mexico. There were thousands of Indians present, and Plummer wrote she had never seen so many people, nor imagined there to be so many Indians. Her accounts of her travels, and the untamed land she saw, remains one of the best descriptions of the early west in existence.

Ironically, Rachel's lot among the Comanche improved dramatically in the month before her ransom. The women charged with her supervision routinely beat and tormented her. One day, Rachel simply snapped, and began fiercely beating the younger of the two women. She expected to be killed for this, writing "at any second I expected a spear in the back, but instead, the warriors seemed amused, and gathered and watched us fight." Rachel's long captivity might have sapped her physical strength, but it had left her with a surfeit of rage and hate which enabled her to easily defeat the younger woman, and nearly beat her to death. After the fight was over, Rachel was astonished that no one had come to the aid of the young Comanche woman, and she herself finally helped her to the lodge, and dressed her wounds. This did not however assuage the anger of the older woman, who then tried to burn Rachel alive. Rachel ended up fighting her too, burning her and beating her savagely. At that point, the tribal council intervened, and listened to statements from all three women. They then ordered Rachel to repair the lodge, which had been damaged during the second fight, as her settlement of the dispute. Realizing with astonishment she was being treated as an equal and full Comanche, Rachel spoke to the Council and told them she refused the judgment unless the other two women assisted her in the repair, since she had started neither fight and since she was being judged as a Comanche, not as a slave, so should be more fairly treated. The Council agreed, and ordered the three to repair the lodge.

Rachel was stunned that she was treated as an equal by the council, which later she understood had arisen from her demonstration of the one quality which elevated anyone in the eyes of the Comanche - courage. Later, one of the Chiefs of the band she was with told her:

You are brave to fight. Good to fallen enemy. You are directed by the Great Spirit. Indians do not have pity on a fallen enemy. By our law, it is clear. It is contrary to our law to show foul play. She began with you, and you had a right to kill her. Your noble spirit forbade you. When Indians fight, the conqueror gives or takes the life of his or her antagonist, and they seldom spare them.

Plummer found her lot much improved by these encounters, as she was correct that nothing she could have done could have earned her more respect than standing her ground and fighting. She noted in her book "they respected bravery more than anything, I learned. I wish I had known it sooner." She wrote how that affected her quite simply: "After that, I took up for myself, and fared much the better for it."

Of course, seeing her status amongst the Comanche was changed dramatically thanks to this demonstration of her courage, she was now haunted by the thought that her baby might have survived if she had defended herself, and him, more fiercely. What she did not know at this point, was that her captivity was coming to an end. Her father's desperate efforts to find her had finally begun to pay off. He had located Comancheros who were willing to go and trade for her, and his instructions were to ransom her at any cost. The Comanches were camped north of Santa Fe, New Mexico when they were approached by Comancheros who wanted to ransom Rachel in accordance with the instructions of her father. She wrote in her book of the agony of believing that the traders had not offered enough to buy her freedom - and her not knowing that in fact, they were simply trying to get the best bargain, because her father had told them to pay any price, no matter how high, to rescue her. She was sold to them on June 19, 1837. Her rescue had been arranged by Colonel and Mrs. William Donaho, acting for the Parker family, and to whom she was delivered in Santa Fe after a journey of 17 days. Two weeks after her arrival, the Donahos, fearing trouble as the native population of Santa Fe was in virtual rebellion, fled some 800 miles (1,300 km) to Independence, Missouri, with Rachel with them. Three months later, Rachel's brother-in-law, Lorenzo D. Nixon, escorted her back to Texas, since her father was still out in the Comancheria searching for her. She was reunited with her husband on February 19, 1838, nearly two years after the Fort Parker massacre. She was gaunt to the point of near starvation, covered with scars and sores, and in very poor health.

== Death ==
Plummer became pregnant again almost as soon as she was returned home, and on January 4, 1839, bore a third child, a son, Luther Plummer II. She died in Houston shortly thereafter, on March 19, 1839; the child died two days later. Though medically she was listed as dying from complications after childbirth, James Parker did not believe that, and insisted she died from the mistreatment she suffered at the hands of the Comanche, the murder of one child, and not knowing what happened to her other child. However, the most likely cause of her death is the trek that she, her husband, her father and several others were forced to make during a night of freezing rain. During James Parker's search for her, he made several enemies; in an unexplained incident, he was accused of murdering a woman and her child. The victims' family had located Parker and were about to attack him to avenge their murdered family members, so Parker snuck his family out of the house during the night, sleeping outdoors and staying off roads. Plummer and her son died during that trek. The night before she died, Plummer reportedly told her father "if only I knew what had become of my dear little James Pratt Plummer I could die in peace." At the time of her death, she was 20 years old, and her fire-red hair had turned grey. James Pratt Plummer, Plummer's only living child, was ransomed in late 1842, and in 1843, he was reunited with his grandfather.

James Parker felt that his son-in-law Luther Plummer had neither supported his efforts to reclaim his wife and grandson nor done much to support the family while Parker did so, so much so that he refused to return his son to him. Despite the President of Texas ruling in Luther Plummer's favor, Parker refused to honor the ruling. James Pratt Plummer never saw his father again, growing up and living with his mother's family. Due to his understanding of James Parker's character, Luther Plummer decided not to press the issue.

According to Frank X. Tolbert, Sam Houston believed that James Parker, rather than Luther Plummer, was at fault in their dispute. Houston communicated in a letter to Luther Thomas Martin (L.T.M.) Plummer that "Reverend Parker had quite a bad reputation with most all he ever had business dealings." He did not trust Parker's judgement and could not believe that he would not return James Pratt Plummer to his father.

== Sources ==
- Bial, Raymond. Lifeways: The Comanche. New York: Benchmark Books, 2000.
- Fehrenbach, Theodore Reed The Comanches: The Destruction of a People. New York: Knopf, 1974, ISBN 0-394-48856-3. Later (2003) republished under the title The Comanches: The History of a People
- Foster, Morris. Being Comanche.
- Frazier, Ian. Great Plains. New York: Farrar, Straus, and Giroux, 1989.
- Lodge, Sally. Native American People: The Comanche. Vero Beach, Florida 32964: Rourke Publications, Inc., 1992.
- Lund, Bill. Native Peoples: The Comanche Indians. Mankato, Minnesota: Bridgestone Books, 1997.
- Mooney, Martin. The Junior Library of American Indians: The Comanche Indians. New York: Chelsea House Publishers, 1993.
- Native Americans: Comanche (August 13, 2005).
- Plummer, Rachel; Parker, James W. The Rachel Plummer Narrative. 1926.
- Powell, Jo Ella Exley Frontier Blood: The Saga of the Parker Family,
- Cynthia Ann Parker
- Tolbert, Frank X., "An Informal History of Texas" published, 1961, Harper, New York
