= Cynthia Ann Parker =

American kidnapped by Comanche Indians (1827–1871)

- Na'ura
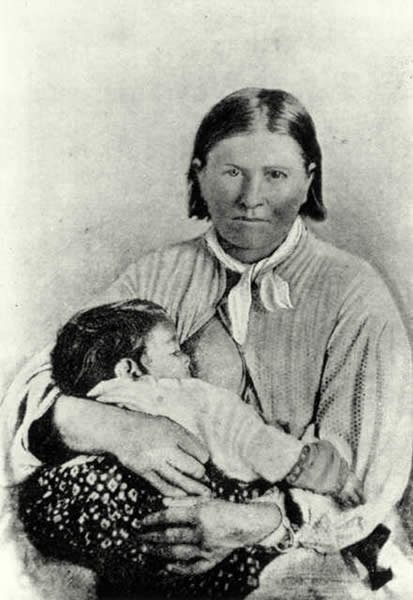
- Cynthia Ann Parker, or Narua (Was Found), and daughter, Topsannah (Prairie Flower), in 1861
- Born: October 28, 1827 (Note: Parker's birth and death date is uncertain. See the Death section for details. The 1870 census lists it in 1824-25.), or 1824/5; Crawford County, Illinois, U.S.
- Disappeared: May 19, 1836 (age 8); Fort Parker, Republic of Texas
- Status: Relocated during the Pease River Massacre on December 19, 1860 (age 33)
- Died: March 1871 (aged 43); Anderson County, Texas, U.S.
- Resting place: Fort Sill Post Cemetery; 34.669466°N 98.395341°W
- Known for: Survivor and witness of the May 19, 1836 Comanche raid on Fort Parker.; Relocated and recaptured during the December 18, 1860, Pease River fight; Assimilation to the Comanche tribe after the raid on Fort Parker.; Lived as a member of the Comanche for 24 years.
- Spouse: Peta Nocona
- Children: Quanah Parker; Pecos; Topsannah (Topʉsana; Prairie Flower)
- Parents: Silas Mercer Parker (father); Lucinda Duty (mother)
- Relatives: John Parker (grandfather); James W. Parker (uncle); Daniel Parker (uncle)

Cynthia Ann Parker, Naduah, Narua, or Preloch (Comanche: Na'ura, IPA: [naʔura], lit. 'Was found'; October 28, 1827 – March 1871), was an American woman who was kidnapped around age nine by a Comanche band during the Fort Parker massacre in 1836, where several of her relatives were killed. She was taken with several of her family members, including her younger brother John Richard Parker. Parker was taken into the tribe, eventually having three children with a chief. Twenty-four years later she was relocated and taken captive by Texas Rangers, aged approximately 33, and unwillingly forced to separate from her husband and her sons and conform to European-American society. Her Comanche name means "was found" or "someone found".

Thoroughly assimilated as Comanche, Parker had married Peta Nocona, a chief. They had three children together, including son Quanah Parker, who became the last free Comanche chief.

Parker was captured by the Texas Rangers on December 19, 1860, during the Battle of Pease River (also known as the "Pease River Massacre"). During this raid, the Rangers killed an estimated six to twelve people, mostly women and children. Afterwards, Parker was taken back to her extended biological family against her will. For the remaining 10 years of her life, she mourned for her Comanche family, and refused to adjust to white society. She escaped at least once but was recaptured and brought back. Unable to grasp how thoroughly she identified with the Comanche, the European-American settlers believed that she had been saved or redeemed by being returned to their society.

Heartbroken over her daughter's death from influenza and pneumonia, Parker died within seven years in 1871. Although initially buried in Anderson County, Texas, her remains were moved twice and are now in Fort Sill Cemetery in Oklahoma.

== Early life ==
Cynthia Ann Parker was born to Silas Mercer Parker and Lucinda Parker (née Duty) in Crawford County, Illinois. Her birth date is uncertain; according to the 1870 census of Anderson County, Texas, she was born in 1824 or 1825. When she was nine or 10 years old, her grandfather, John Parker, was recruited to settle his family in north-central Texas; he was to establish a settlement fortified against Comanche raids, which had been devastating to the Euro-American colonization of Texas and northern Mexico. The Parker family, its extended kin, and surrounding families established fortified blockhouses and a central citadel—later named Fort Parker—on the headwaters of the Navasota River in what is now Limestone County.

== Fort Parker massacre ==
John Parker, the patriarch of the family, had been a noted ranger, scout, Native American fighter, and soldier for the United States. Historians conjecture that when he negotiated treaties with the local non-Comanche natives, he believed those treaties would bind all Native Americans. If so, his experience did not give him an understanding of the independent nature of Indian tribes and bands.

On May 19, 1836, a force of from 100 to 600 Native American warriors, composed of Comanche and Kiowa and Kichai allies, attacked the community. John Parker and his men were unprepared for the assault and quickly found themselves overrun, forcing them to retreat into the fort with their families. The Native Americans attacked the fort and quickly overpowered the outnumbered defenders. The Comanche took Cynthia Ann Parker, a young girl, and five other captives with them back to Comanche territory after slaughtering all remaining men, women, and children in the fort. The Texans quickly mounted a rescue force. During the Texans' pursuit of the Native Americans, a teenage girl escaped. Over a period of years, the Comanche released other captives as their families paid ransoms but Parker was adopted by a Comanche family and became thoroughly assimilated. She is estimated to have been 8 years old when taken.

== Marriage to Peta Nocona ==
Parker became assimilated into the tribe. She was adopted by a Tenowish Comanche couple, who raised her as their own daughter. She became Comanche in every sense. She married Peta Nocona, a chief. They enjoyed a happy marriage. They had three children: sons Quanah, who became the last free Comanche chief, and Pecos (Pecan), and a daughter Topsannah (Prairie Flower).

== Return to Texas ==
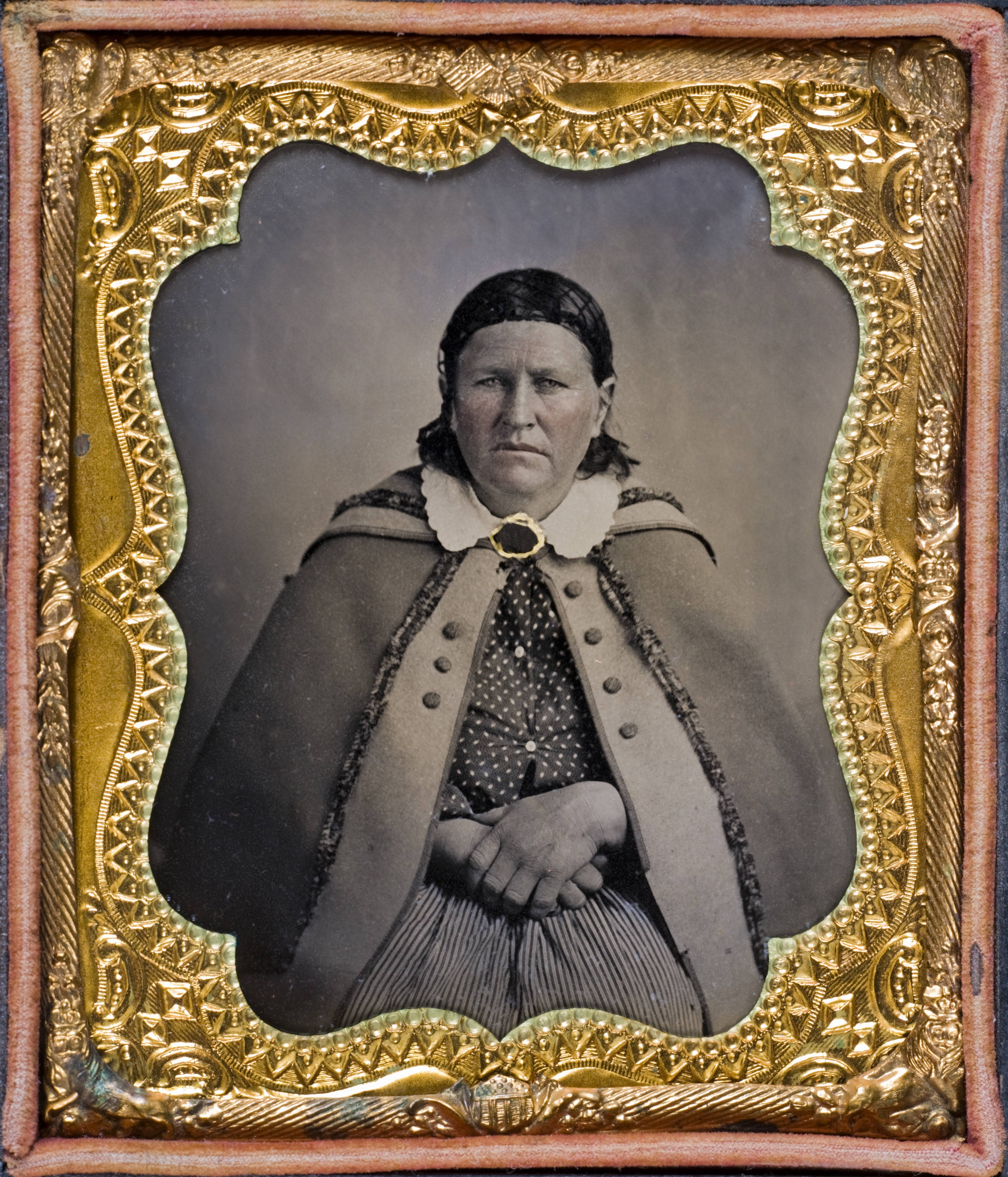
Tintype of Cynthia Ann Parker, 1861

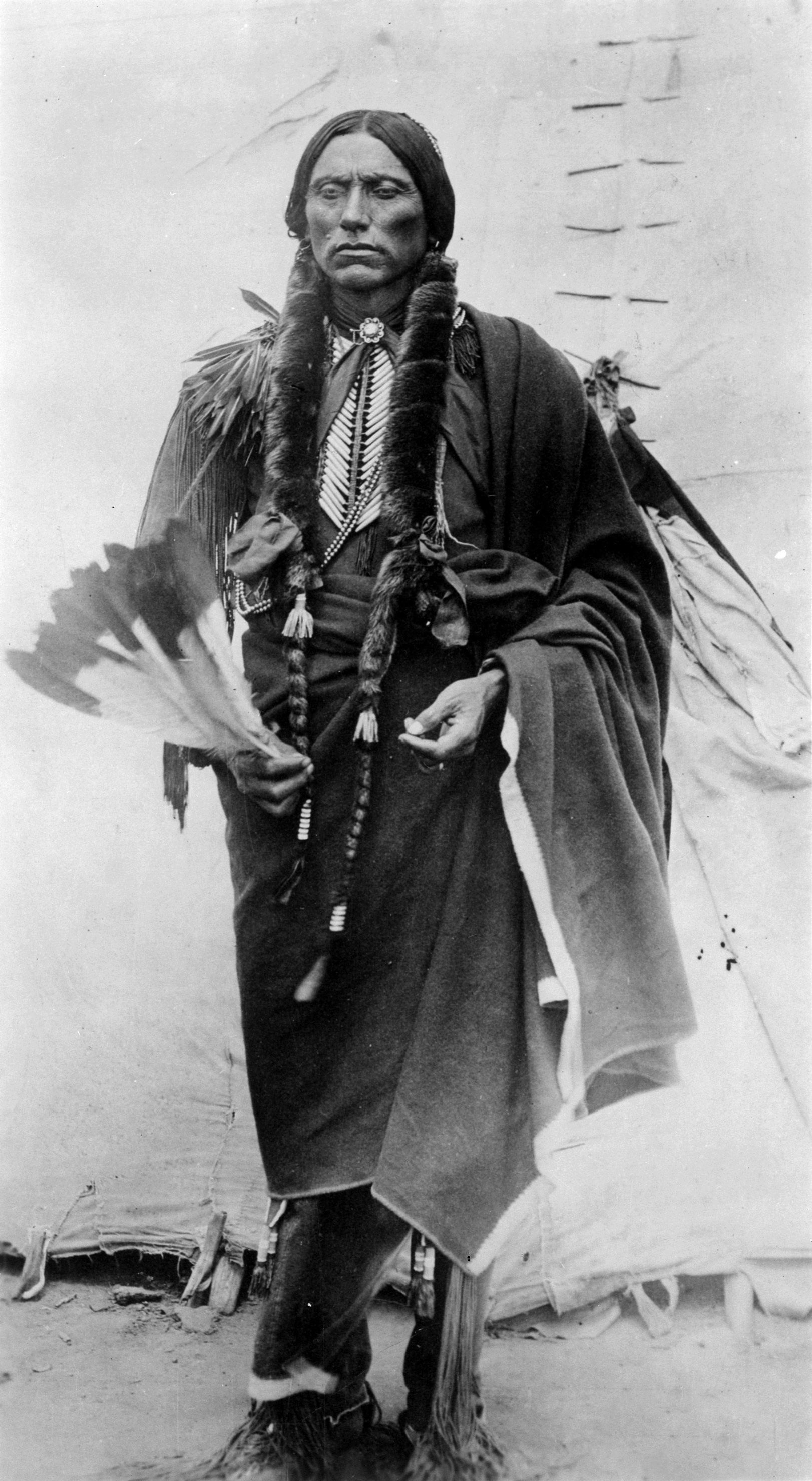
Chief Quanah Parker clasping a peyote feather fan

In December 1860, after years of searching at the behest of Parker's father and various scouts, a band of Texas Rangers led by Lawrence Sullivan Ross discovered a band of Comanche, deep in the heart of Comancheria, that was rumored to hold American captives. In a surprise raid, the Rangers attacked a group of Comanche in the Battle of Pease River.

After limited fighting, the Comanche attempted to flee. Ranger Ross and several of his men pursued the man who had appeared as the leader, and who was fleeing alongside a woman rider. As Ross and his men neared, she held a child over her head. She then shouted "Americano! Americano!" or opened her robe to expose her breasts, according to different accounts. The men did not shoot, but instead surrounded and stopped her. Ross ordered Lieutenant Tom Keliheir to stay with the woman and her child. Ross continued to follow the chief, eventually shooting him three times. Although he fell off his horse, he was still alive and refused to surrender. Ross's cook, Antonio Martinez, identified the man as Nocona and killed him.

The woman was covered in grease from handling buffalo meat. She was noticed to have light hair and blue eyes. The Rangers began questioning the woman and other surviving Comanche. In broken English, she identified herself and her family name. Her information matched what Ross knew of captives taken in the 1836 Fort Parker Massacre. Parker wept over the body of Nocona, but the soldiers did not permit her to stay with the body. She was brought to the battlefield, and she wailed loudly over the body of one warrior, stating "He's my boy, and he's not my boy." The warrior was the son of another white captive who had married a Comanche, but had since died. She had asked Parker to care for her son as if he were her own.

Ross sent Parker and her daughter to Camp Cooper, and notified her uncle, Colonel Isaac Parker that she had been returned. He took her to his home near Birdville.

Parker's return to her birth family captured the country's imagination. In 1861, the Texas legislature granted her a square league of land (about 4,400 acres or 18 km^{2}) and an annual pension of $100 (~$3,583 in 2025) for the next five years. They appointed her cousins, Isaac Duke Parker and Benjamin F. Parker, as her legal guardians.

However, Parker never adjusted to her new surroundings. Although white and physically part of the community, she was uncomfortable with the attention she received. Her brother, Silas Jr., was appointed her guardian in 1862, and took her to his home in Van Zandt County. When he entered the Confederate Army, she went to live with her sister, Orlena Parker O'Quinn. Some said that she missed her husband and her sons and worried about them.

== Death ==
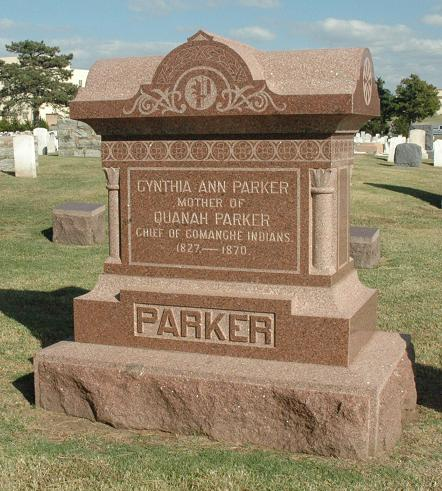
Cynthia's grave

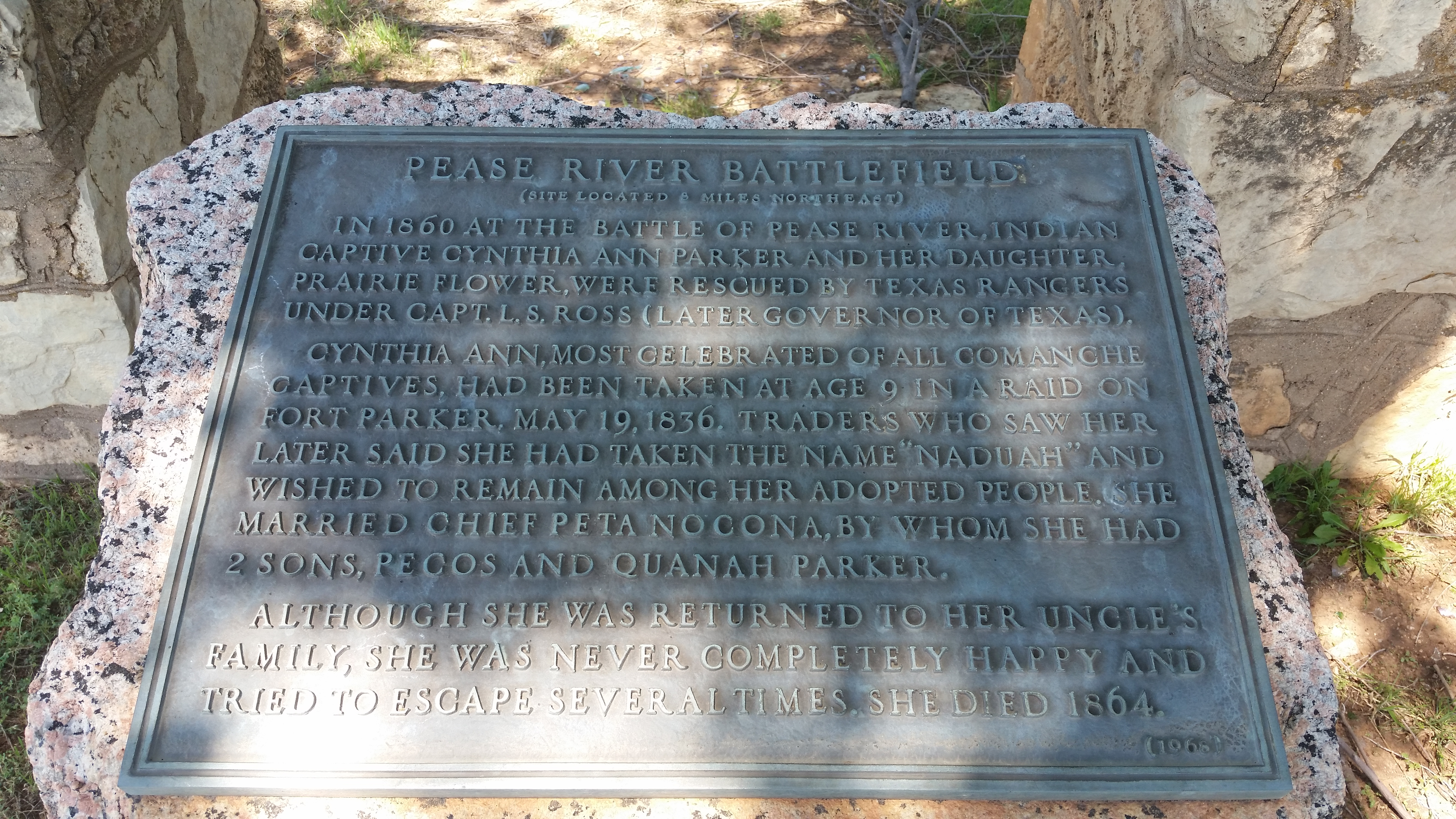
Texas historical marker for Parker in Crowell, Texas

In 1864, Parker's daughter, Topsannah, caught influenza and died of pneumonia. Parker was stricken with grief. Adding to the deep sadness of the loss of her husband, her sons and Comanche way of life, she began refusing food and water. She died in March 1871 at the O'Quinn home and was buried in Foster Cemetery on County Road 478 in Anderson County near Poynor. (Note: Foster Cemetery, Anderson County, Texas; First Gravesite of Cynthia Ann Parker: approximately 6 miles north of Brushy Creek off FM 315 on Millnar Road in Foster Cemetery: Texas marker #8793 32.042272°N 95.599084°W)

There is some confusion about Parker's birth and death dates. Different sources place her birth from 1825 to 1827 in Coles, Clark, or Crawford counties of Illinois, and her death from 1864 to 1871 in Anderson County. The only record of her death, given as March 1871, is found in the unpublished notebook of Susan Parker St. John. The only known document from the period supports the March 1871 date; an 1870 census for Anderson County lists her as a member of the O'Quinn household, born about 1825, and age forty-five. Her tombstone marks her year of death as 1870.

In 1910, Parker's son, Quanah, moved her remains and had them reinterred in Post Oak Mission Cemetery near Cache, Oklahoma. When he died in February 1911, he was buried next to her.

Their bodies were moved in 1957 to the Fort Sill Post Cemetery at Fort Sill, Oklahoma. In 1965 the state of Texas had Topsannah's body moved from her grave in Edom, Van Zandt County, Texas, to be reinterred near her mother and brother.

== Legacy ==
The city of Crowell, Texas, has held a Cynthia Ann Parker Festival to honor her memory. The town of Groesbeck holds an annual Christmas Festival at the site of old Fort Parker every December. It has been rebuilt on the original site to historic specifications.

=== Film portrayal ===
Author and screenwriter Michael Blake said that the character of Stands with a Fist in the 1990 film Dances With Wolves, was actually based upon Parker.

== Representation in other media ==
- Cynthia Parker (c. 1939) is a one-act opera composed by Julia Smith.
- The movie The Searchers (1956) was based on Alan Le May's novel of the same name. It was directed by John Ford and starred John Wayne as a frontiersman searching for years for his kidnapped niece.
- In The Hanging Tree (1957), a collection of short stories by Western writer Dorothy M. Johnson, the story "Lost Sister" is a fictional account of Parker's forced return to and difficulties in European-American society.
- The graphic novel Comanche Moon (1979) by Jaxon depicts Parker's story from her adoption by the Comanche through the life of her son Quanah.
- Ride the Wind (1982) by Lucia St. Clair Robson is an historical novel of Parker's capture and life among the Comanche.
- Run (2025) a song by Tophouse the Band is inspired by the life of Parker.

== Sources ==
- Benner, Judith Ann (1983), Sul Ross, Soldier, Statesman, Educator, College Station, Texas: Texas A&M University Press, ISBN 9780890961421
- Exley, Jo Ella Powell (2001), Frontier Blood: Saga of the Parker Family, College Station: Texas A&M University Press, ISBN 978-1-58544-136-5
- Frankel, Glenn (2013), The Searchers: The Making of An American Legend, New York: Bloomsbury
- McBride, Joseph (2001), Searching for John Ford: A Life, New York: St. Martin's Press
