= Robert Lindneux =

American painter

Robert Lindneux (1871 — 1970) was an American painter from Denver, Colorado. He did paintings of the Old West, including Native Americans like Quanah Parker and pioneers like Buffalo Bill.

== Early life ==
In the 1860s, the family came to America, ultimately settling in New York City. Lindneux was born in 1871 and was educated in Paris, London and Germany. He was a first-generation American, as both his parents were immigrants from France.

== Career ==
Lindneux became a painter in Europe. He exhibited his work in Paris in 1893. He returned to the United States, and he decided to move to Colorado and paint the American West in 1900. He traveled to Montana, Wyoming and South Dakota to do paintings of Native Americans. For example, he did a portrait of Quanah Parker, the leader of the Comanche nation.

Lindneux used both charcoal and oil. In the 1900s, he taught Charles M. Russell how to use oil, and the two men painted together in Russell's studio in Great Falls, Montana. Lindneux did paintings of American pioneers like Buffalo Bill, and he exhibited his work at the Gilcrease Museum in Oklahoma. According to the Kansas City Times, he became known as "the last of the great cowboy artists."

== Personal life and death ==
With his wife, Lindneux had a daughter, Marcella. They resided in Denver, Colorado.

Lindneux died in 1970 in Denver, Colorado, at age 98. The vast majority of his work was sold by his daughter to Orville and Polly Clevenger, who exhibited their collection at West Texas State University in 1982.
