= James W. Parker =

American politician (1797–1864)

James William Parker
- Born: July 4, 1797; Franklin County, Georgia, or Elbert County, Georgia
- Died: 1864 (aged 66–67); Houston County, Texas, Confederate States of America
- Resting place: Pilgrim Cemetery, Elkhart, Anderson County, Texas
- Known for: Member of the Consultation of Texas Representatives (1835); Member of the original Texas Rangers (1835); Survivor and witness of the raid on Fort Parker, Texas (May 19, 1836); Searched for the survivors of the Fort Parker massacre (1836-1845); Author of Narrative of the Perilous Adventures, Miraculous Escapes and Sufferings of Rev. James W. Parker . . . (Louisville, 1844)
- Spouse: 1st Martha Duty 2nd Lavina E. Chaffin
- Children: Rachel Parker
- Parent: John Parker Sarah White
- Relatives: Daniel Parker, Cynthia Ann Parker, John Richard Parker, Peta Nocona, Quanah Parker

James William Parker (July 4, 1797 – 1864) was the uncle of Cynthia Ann Parker and the great-uncle of Quanah Parker, principal chief of the Comanche. A man of English American descent, he was a member of the large Parker frontier family that settled in east Texas in the 1830s.

Parker was present in 1836 during the raid of Fort Parker by Comanches and allied tribes near present-day Groesbeck, Texas. During that raid, his daughter Rachel Plummer, his grandson James Plummer, his niece Cynthia Ann Parker, and his nephew John Richard Parker were kidnapped by a Native American raiding party. Parker made the search for his family a lifetime obsession. For nine years he roamed the Comancheria searching for his lost relatives.

Many historians and Hollywood observers believe that Parker was the inspiration for John Wayne's character Ethan Edwards in the John Ford movie, The Searchers.

== Birth and early years ==
James W. Parker was born July 4, 1797, in northeast Georgia, probably in Franklin County, Georgia^{1} or Elbert County, the son of Elder John Parker (1758-1836) and Sally (White) Parker. He had twelve siblings, including younger brothers Silas Mercer Parker, and Benjamin Parker. His older brother Daniel Parker became a famous country preacher. After living his first six years in Georgia, Parker moved with his family to Dickson County, Tennessee in the summer of 1803.

Parker spent most of his youth in Tennessee. At the age of eighteen, Parker moved with his family to the Territory of Illinois in 1815. There, he married Martha (Patsy) Duty on July 14, 1816. From 1816 to 1829, he and his family farmed in Illinois, while considering moving to Texas. In 1830, he and his family moved to Conway County, Arkansas, which they used as a base while they made several exploratory trips into Texas. In 1832, Parker proposed to Stephen F. Austin that the Parker Family be permitted to settle fifty families north of the Little Brazos River, in what was then considered part of the Comancheria. Austin did not reply to this proposal.

Parker claimed to have been one of the men who found Josiah P. Wilbarger in 1833, during one of his early trips to Texas, after Wilbarger had been scalped and left for dead by the Comanches.

== Moving to Texas ==
In 1834, James Parker and most of the Parker clan moved to Texas. Parker first registered at Fort Tenoxtitlán on January 29, 1834, and applied for legal admission to Robertson's colony. Changing his mind, he then registered on May 22, 1834, for admission under Mexican law to the Austin and Williams colony. But his persistence had interested authorities in awarding him his own grant, and this finally occurred on April 1, 1835.

He joined other Parker family members, including his brothers Silas and Benjamin and their families, in moving to Texas. They moved to their land grant, and built Fort Parker at the headwaters of the Navasota River, near Groesbeck. It was completed in March 1834, before Parker had even been legally awarded the land it was built on. Their father, Elder John Parker, then joined them with his second wife, Sarah ((Duty) born Pinson) Parker. Fort Parker's 12-foot (3.7 m) high pointed log walls enclosed 4 acres (16,000 m^{2}). Blockhouses were placed on two corners for lookouts and to make defense of the fort possible. Six cabins were attached to the inside walls. The fort had one large gate facing south, and a small rear gate for easy access to the spring waters.

Though the families in the Parker group were beginning to build cabins outside the fort, the vast majority still slept inside for protection. Elder John Parker had negotiated treaties with local Indian chiefs, and believed they would protect the little colony. James Parker was not so sure, due to the fact that the Comanche were not a unified tribe as Americans understood the term, and he understood that all bands would not feel bound to accept a treaty made by only one. His brother Silas had raised and become captain of a local Texas Ranger company, which James felt could attract the anger of Indians who felt abused by the Rangers.

== Fort Parker Massacre ==
On May 19, 1836, a large force of Comanche and allied warriors attacked the fort, killing five men and capturing two women and three children. Parker was working the fields when the attack happened. His daughter, Rachel Parker Plummer was captured along with her three-year-old son, James Pratt Plummer. His brother Silas's children, Cynthia Ann and John Richard were also captured, as well as his stepsister Elizabeth Duty Kellogg.

His sister-in-law Elizabeth Duty Kellogg was ransomed back almost immediately by Sam Houston. His daughter was ransomed back from the Comanche after almost two years of servitude, which she described as being cruel almost beyond the point of belief. (Including the murder of her newborn son by the Comanche, who according to her account, had felt he interfered with her work). The horrific condition his daughter was in when she was ransomed, and her subsequent death, left James Parker with a lifelong hatred of the Comanche. His determination to find his grandson, niece and nephew became obsessive. Though his daughter had desperately wanted to be rescued, and her son accepted rescue, his niece and nephew most emphatically did not want to leave the Indians when their "rescue" eventually came. Cynthia Ann spent almost 25 years among the Comanches, and her brother at least 13 years. Cynthia Ann was asked at least twice if she wanted to be ransomed, but refused, asking the tribal council to allow her to remain with the Comanche. Her brother John was given no choice, and was forced to return to the whites after a ransom was paid, but he was allowed to return to the Indians when he ran away to do so.

== Search ==
Parker had no use for Native Americans even before the Fort Parker massacre. On the first page of his diary and written memories, James Parker dates his feelings about Indians from the War of 1812 and the death of his brother:

This awakened in me feelings of the most bitter hostility towards the Indians, and I firmly resolved, and impatiently awaited, for an opportunity to avenge his death ... though I may despise their treachery, I pity their ignorance and mourn the wrongs I have received at their hands, yet I pray to God to enable me to forgive them, and to sincerely pray for the speedy civilization and Christianization of their whole race.

His hatred intensified after he heard his daughter's account of her captivity and the murder of her second child, writing, "there are no words for how I feel about my daughter's suffering, and the murder of my grandchild." In her account of her life among the Comanche, Plummer wrote that six weeks after giving birth to a healthy son, the warriors decided she was slowed too much by childcare, and threw her son down on the ground. When he stopped moving, they left her to bury him. When she revived him, they returned and tied the infant to a rope, and dragged him through cactuses until the tiny body was torn to pieces. Of her own rape and torture, Plummer said

To undertake to narrate their barbarous treatment would only add to my present distress, for it is with feelings of the deepest mortification that I think of it, much less to speak or write of it.

Parker searched from 1836 to 1845, a period of nine years, for his daughter, his grandson, and his niece and nephew. He saw his daughter ransomed, only to die less than a year after her recovery. Though medically she was listed as dying from complications after childbirth, Parker insisted she died from the mistreatment she suffered at the hands of the Comanche, the murder of one child, and not knowing what happened to her other child. At the time of her death, the twenty-year-old Plummer's fiery red hair had turned grey.

Parker appealed to the then-President of the Republic of Texas, then the Governor of Texas attempting to raise sufficient troops to force the return of his family. Although many sympathized with James Parker and the Parker family for their loss, and some, including Sam Houston, donated money (Houston paid the ransom for Kellog), no official of the Republic of Texas supported a full-scale military expedition to recover the lost ones. Sam Houston offered to negotiate with the Comanche, but Parker indignantly refused – nothing could have offended him more than offering to negotiate with the people who had murdered his infant grandson. Houston, did, however, pay the ransom for Kellogg. In the end, faced with going alone into the Comancheria, risking torture and death daily, or doing nothing to reclaim his family, Parker chose to go alone into the Comancheria, year after year. On at least five occasions he escaped from the Comanches after they had begun trailing him with the intent to capture and kill him. His many escapes and adventures bordered on the unbelievable, yet sufficient of them were corroborated by Indians or other Anglos that his story is accepted as true.

Parker's relentless pressing for action on the return of Comanche captives did, however, provide some impetus for the 1840 Council House Fight.

== James Pratt Plummer ==
During Parker's incessant searching, his family lived in relative poverty, often dependent on charity. His son-in-law, on the other hand, remained home and became relatively prosperous. Parker felt extremely strongly that Luther Plummer should have accompanied him on his trips into the Comancheria to search for Rachel Plummer and her son.

If he could not do that, then Parker felt that Luther Plummer should have contributed to the searches financially. Parker claimed that Luther Plummer never even reimbursed him for the ransom and fees he incurred in searching for Rachel. Parker later reclaimed both John Richard Parker and his own grandson, James Pratt Plummer. John Richard was too old to adjust to Anglo life and soon ran away to the Comanche. James Pratt Plummer was younger, more adaptable, and perhaps more importantly, his grandfather watched him a great deal closer. Parker then refused to return his grandson to his father, claiming that Luther Plummer had not even paid his ransom. When the father appealed to the Governor of Texas, who found for him, Parker simply refused to honor the order to return his grandson. Luther Plummer, who had remarried and had a child by his new wife, did not pursue the matter, and left his son with his grandfather.

== Retirement ==
In 1845, Parker's wife Martha could no longer bear his yearly searches. His other five children had grown up without him, and she was tired of living in poverty. Further, rumors of Parker's activities included murder and robbery, and he placed an ad in the paper to deny any involvement in the murder of the Taylor family, or any of the other crimes rumor attached to his name. Parker indignantly pointed out he was in a completely different part of the country from where these crimes were committed.

After the death of his first wife on October 3, 1846, Parker married Lavina E. Chaffin on April 26, 1847. He died in 1864 in extreme northern Houston County and is buried in Pilgrim Cemetery in Anderson County, near Elkhart.

Although he stopped his personal search for his niece and nephew, Parker never stopped giving money to those claiming they had seen Cynthia Ann, his niece. He lived the remainder of his life with his wife and family. His nine-year search for his daughter, grandson, niece and nephew, had led him to adventures so incredible that he admitted in his published diary that he understood people not believing his tales.

another reason for omitting a detail of many of my sufferings and miraculous escapes is, that I am confident, few, if any, would believe them ... what I have narrated is nothing next to the awful reality ... My readers express some surprise that I always went on these tours alone. A moments [sic.] reflection will convince them of the propriety of my doing so. I was not permitted to take a sufficient number of men to fight the Indians and my only hope was to steal or buy the prisoners from the enemy. The fewer in my company then, the less was the danger of my being discovered by the savages and killed.

== Legacy ==
The novelist and screenplay writer Alan Le May visited Ben Parker, a descendant of the Parker family in Texas, and viewed Parker family sites before writing a novel called The Searchers. Ben Parker recalled that, to his surprise, LeMay was not as interested in Cynthia Ann as in her uncle James, who had searched for her for eight years after her abduction.

Historians and film critics have speculated on the inspiration for the character of Ethan Edwards in the John Ford movie The Searchers, with many saying that the character was based on James Parker. Critics and historians noted that James W. Parker, Cynthia Ann's uncle, spent much of his life and fortune in what became an obsessive search for his niece, like Ethan Edwards in the film. In addition, the "rescue" of Cynthia Ann, during a Texas Ranger attack on the village where she lived, resembles the rescue of Debbie Edwards when the Texas Rangers attack Scar's village.

The Searchers movie inspired a number of American filmmakers and screenwriters, including Martin Scorsese, Steven Spielberg, George Lucas, John Milius, Curtis Hanson, and Paul Schrader, all of whom grew up watching the film and have testified to its influence over their own filmmaking. Glenn Frankel suggests that Martin Scorsese's Taxi Driver probably comes the closest to re-imagining The Searchers for the modern age. The Travis Bickle (Robert De Niro) character is the obsessed and violent taxi driver whose twisted personal code and use of gun violence mirror those of Ethan Edwards/James Parker. So does the object of the search who refuses to acquiesce to her own rescue, played by Jodie Foster, who mirrors Cynthia Ann Parker.

== Sources ==
- Bial, Raymond. Lifeways: The Comanche. New York: Benchmark Books, 2000.
- Fehrenbach, Theodore Reed The Comanches: The Destruction of a People. New York: Knopf, 1974, ISBN 0-394-48856-3. Later (2003) republished under the title The Comanches: The History of a People
- Foster, Morris. Being Comanche.
- Frankel, Glenn. The Searchers: The Making of An American Legend. New York: Bloomsbury, 2013.
- Frazier, Ian. Great Plains. New York: Farrar, Straus, and Giroux, 1989.
- Lodge, Sally. Native American People: The Comanche. Vero Beach, Florida 32964: Rourke Publications, Inc., 1992.
- Lund, Bill. Native Peoples: The Comanche Indians. Mankato, Minnesota: Bridgestone Books, 1997.
- Mooney, Martin. The Junior Library of American Indians: The Comanche Indians. New York: Chelsea House Publishers, 1993.
- Native Americans: Comanche (August 13, 2005).
- Exley, Jo Ella Powell. Frontier Blood: The Saga of the Parker Family.
- Cynthia Ann Parker
