= Quanah Parker Star House =

Historic house in Oklahoma, United States

- U.S. National Register of Historic Places
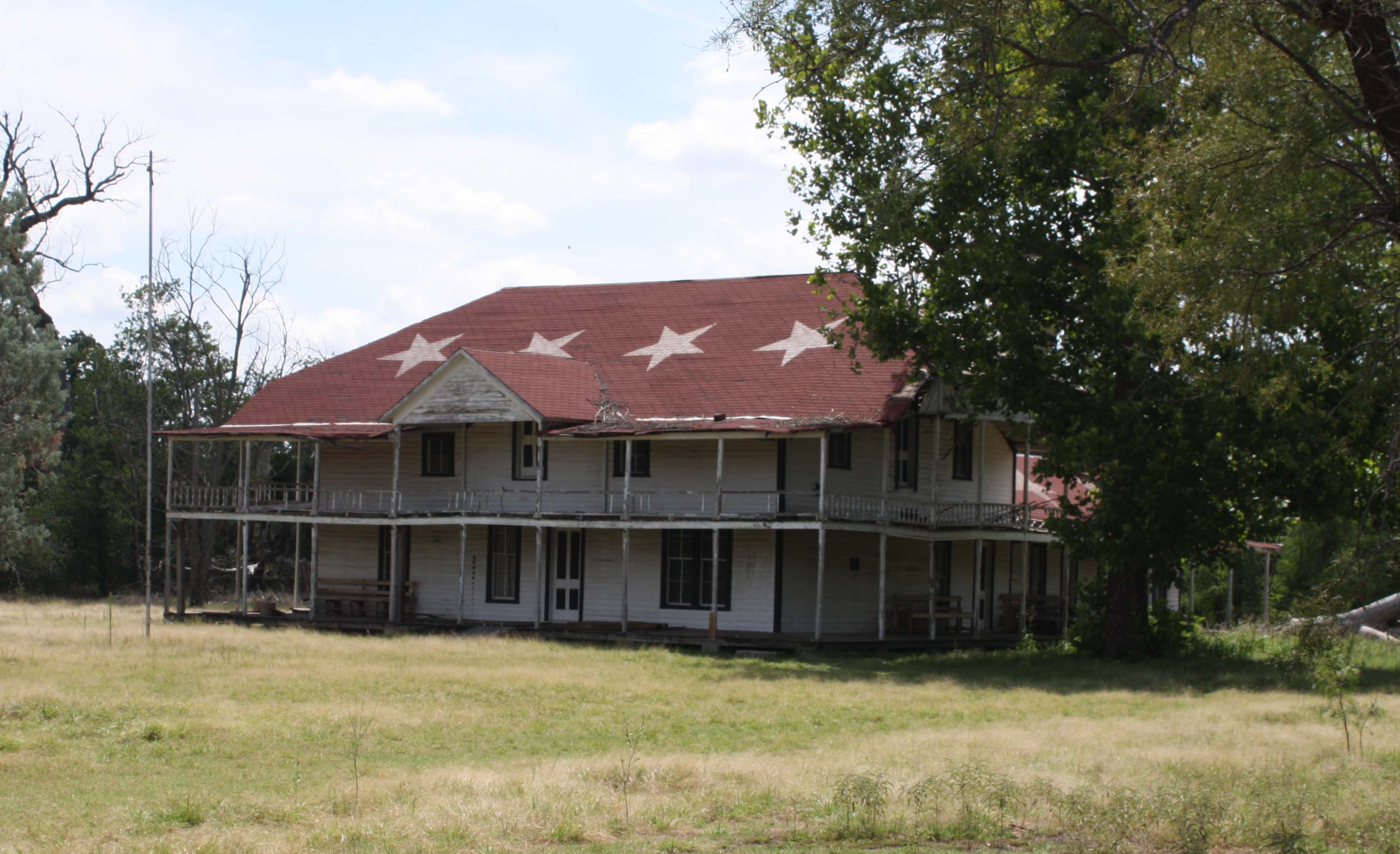
- Exterior view of the Quanah Parker Star House (August 2014)

- Location within Oklahoma Location within the United States
- Location: Eagle Park; Cache, Oklahoma
- Coordinates: 34°38′04″N 98°38′30″W
- Built: ca 1890
- NRHP reference No.: 70000532
- Added to NRHP: September 29, 1970

The Quanah Parker Star House is located in the city of Cache, county of Comanche, in the U.S. state of Oklahoma. Featuring distinctive stars painted on its roof, it is the former home of Quanah Parker, and was added in 1970 to the National Register of Historic Places listings in Comanche County, Oklahoma.

== Background ==
After Comanche chief Quanah Parker's surrender in 1875, he lived for many years in a reservation tipi. Parker decided that he needed living quarters more befitting his status among the Comanches, and more suitable to his position as a spokesperson for the white cattle owners. In order to accommodate his multiple wives and children, this two-story ten-room clapboard house with ten-foot ceilings and a picket fence was constructed for Parker. Request for financial assistance was denied by the United States Government. Parker's friends in the cattle business, in particular 6666 Ranch owner Samuel Burk Burnett, financed the building of the house, circa 1890.

== Construction ==
The cost of construction was slightly over $2,000 ($48,000 in 2010, adjusted for inflation). In his formal wallpapered dining room with its wood-burning stove, Parker entertained white business associates, celebrities and tribal members alike. Among his celebrated visitors was Theodore Roosevelt. Parker was a founding supporter of the Native American Church. His home was often the scene of practitioners who sought him out for spiritual advice. Parker fed hungry tribal members in his home and was known to never turn away anyone.

== After Parker's death ==
The structure was purchased by his daughter Laura Neda Parker Birdsong upon Parker's 1911 death. Originally located near the Wichita Mountains north of Cache on Fort Sill's west range, Birdsong moved the house to Cache and sold it to Herbert Woesner in 1958. Although no one can be certain why Parker painted the stars on his roof, lore has it that he meant it as a display of rank and importance equal to a military general. The current owner, Woesner's nephew Wayne Gipson, offered the explanation told to him by Parker's descendants that the Chief had been to Washington, D.C., to speak with Theodore Roosevelt, and while there had stayed in a "five star hotel". Parker had 10 stars painted on his roof to explain to Roosevelt upon his arrival that he would have better accommodations with ten stars instead of five. The Preservation Oklahoma organization has listed the Star House as endangered.

== Preservation ==
The Star House is listed on the National Register of Historic Places and is also on Oklahoma's list of Most Endangered Historic Places. A storm in 2015 further damaged the already crumbling house, but stimulated efforts to preserve and reconstruct it, although preservation efforts are complicated by the fact that the house is in private ownership. A grant from the National trust for Historic Preservation enabled an assessment of the condition of the house and developed a plan to maintain it. The cost of restoring the house was estimated at more than one million dollars.

== Bibliography ==
- Floyd, Larry C. (April 19, 2024). "Quanah Parker's Star House: A Comanche Home Along the White Man's Road" [Star House]. The Chronicles of Oklahoma. 90 (2 - Summer 2012). Oklahoma Historical Society: 132–159. LCCN 23027299. OCLC 655582328.
