= Fort Parker massacre =

1836 American Indian attack

- Part of the Texas–Indian wars
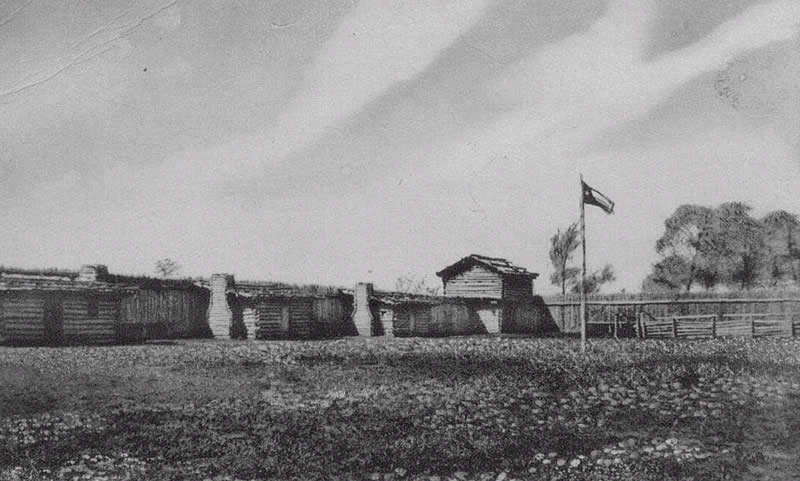
- An illustration of Fort Parker
Date	May 19, 1836
Location	Fort Parker, Texas 31.56382°N 96.54792°W
Result	Native American victory

Belligerents
Comanche; Kiowa; Caddo; Wichita	Republic of Texas

Commanders and leaders
Unknown	John Parker (executed)

Strength
100–600 Indians	~15 militia

Casualties and losses
None	5 killed 5 captured; 21 not captured
- Location within Texas Fort Parker (the United States)

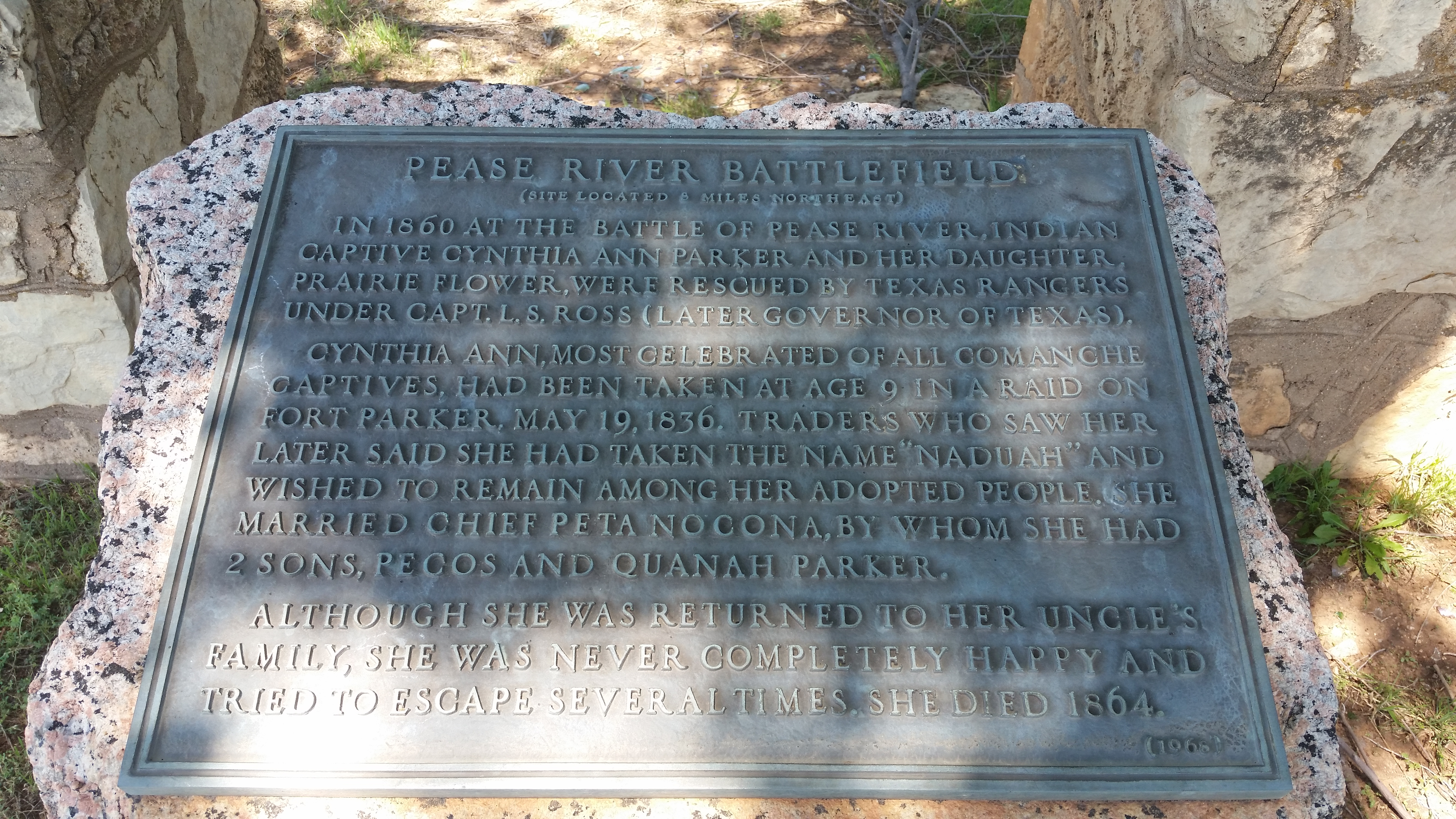
Texas historical marker in Crowell, Texas

The Fort Parker massacre, also known as the Fort Parker raid, was an attack carried out by a contingent of Comanche, Kiowa, Caddo, and Wichita raiders at Fort Parker on May 19, 1836, where a group of Texians was killed. During the attack, Cynthia Ann Parker, then approximately nine years old (Note: Parker's birth date is uncertain. The 1870 census lists it in 1824-25.), was captured and spent most of the rest of her life within the Comanche Nation, later marrying Chief Peta Nocona and giving birth to three children, including a son, Quanah Parker, who became a prominent leader of the Comanches and a war leader during the Red River War of 1874–75. Cynthia’s brother John Richard Parker was also captured and remained with the Comanches for six years before his release was negotiated. He was unable to readapt to Western society and chose to return to the Comanche Nation for several more years.

== Background ==
Fort Parker was established about 2 mi (3.2 km) north of present-day Groesbeck, Limestone County, Texas, United States, by John Parker, his sons, Benjamin, Silas, and James, with other members of the Pilgrim Predestinarian Baptist Church of Crawford County, Illinois. Led by John and Daniel Parker, they came to Texas in 1833. Daniel's party first settled in Grimes County, then later moved to Anderson County near present-day Elkhart and established Pilgrim Church. Elder John Parker's group settled near the headwaters of the Navasota River, and built a fort for protection against Native Americans. It was completed in March 1834. Fort Parker's 12-foot-high (3.7 m) log walls enclosed four acres (16,000 m^{2}). Blockhouses were placed on two corners for lookouts, and six cabins were attached to the inside walls. The fort had two entrances, a large double gate facing south, and a small gate for easy access to the spring. Most of the residents of the fort were part of the extended family of John and Sarah Parker.

== Massacre ==
Soon, the settlers were making their homes and farming the land. Several had built cabins on their farms and used the fort for protection. Peace treaties were made with surrounding Native American chiefs. Following the massacre of Anglos at the Alamo, the Comanche and other local tribes were emboldened to retake their lost lands.

On May 19, 1836, a large party of Native Americans, including Comanches, Kiowas, Caddos, and Wichitas, attacked the inhabitants of Fort Parker. In her memoir, Rachel Plummer wrote, "one minute the fields (in front of the fort) were clear, and the next moment, more Indians than I dreamed possible were in front of the fort."

One of the Indians approached the fort with a white flag. No one believed the flag was genuine. Silas Parker wanted the five men present to man the walls and fight as best they could. Benjamin Parker felt that by going out, he could buy time for the majority of the women and children to flee out the back (small) gate. He felt that there was simply no way that five men would be able to hold the Indians out more than a second or two, as they could use ropes to scale the walls. He felt that the war party would then kill everyone in the fort and the unsuspecting men in the fields. He argued with Silas that they had to barter their lives for time for everyone else. Their father agreed with Benjamin.

Benjamin knew he was going to be killed. According to Rachel Plummer's account, Benjamin returned to the fort, after his first talk with the war party, and told his brother and father that he believed they would all be killed, and that they should run swiftly to the woods. Silas again argued with him, telling him they should push the big gate shut, and man the walls. Ben pointed out, rightly, Rachel said, that there was no time, and their "course was decided." He told her, "run little Rachel, for your life and your unborn child, run now and fast!" She said he then straightened up and went back outside. She recounted how Silas told her to watch the front gate, after Benjamin had gone out to talk to the Indians the second time, when she herself wanted to flee, while he ran for his musket and powder pouch. "They will kill Benjamin," she reported her Uncle Silas saying, "and then me, but I will do for at least one of them, by God." At that moment, she said she heard whooping outside the fort, and then Indians were inside.

The 3–5 minutes bought enough time that the majority of the women and children did get away. Rachel Plummer, who was pregnant, was afraid she would not be able to keep up while carrying her two-year-old son, so she stayed in the fort. She began running after seeing the Indians come into the fort, holding her little boy's hand, while behind her she said she saw Indians stabbing Benjamin with their lances, and then she heard "Uncle Silas shout defiance as though he had a thousand men with him. Alas, he was alone, and soon dead." Lucy Parker, who also had a small child, stopped to argue with her husband Silas, begging him to come with her. Elizabeth Duty Kellogg stopped to gather up their savings, $100 in coins, before she attempted to escape.

Benjamin Parker was killed, and before the fort's gates could be closed, the raiders rushed inside. Silas Parker, who was outside with his brother, was killed before he was able to get back inside the gate. Samuel Frost and his son Robert were killed inside the gate, as they attempted to flee. John Parker was castrated and then scalped. His wife came out of the woods when she saw his torture and was captured. Lucy Parker and her youngest two children were initially captured, but were rescued by David Faulkenberry as he ran up to the fort from the fields. Her two oldest children, however, along with Rachel and her son, and Elizabeth Kellogg were successfully kidnapped.

In all, five men were killed, some were left for dead, two women and three children were captured. Twenty-one settlers escaped and made their way to Fort Houston, which was located near what is now Palestine, Texas.

== Fort Parker inhabitants on 19 May 1836 ==
- Elder John Parker (aged 77 years 8 months, killed) and second wife, Sarah Pinson Duty
  - Benjamin F. W. Parker (aged 48 years, killed)
  - Isaac Parker (aged 43 years 1 month)
  - James William Parker (aged 38 years 10 months) and wife, Martha Duty
    - Sarah Parker (aged 18 years 9 months) and husband, Lorenzo Dow Nixon
    - Rachel Parker (aged 17 years 2 months, captured) and husband, Luther Martin Thomas Plummer (aged approximately 24 years 11 months)
      - James Pratt Plummer (aged 1 year 4 months, captured)
    - James William Parker (aged 6 years 10 months)
    - Francis Marion Parker (aged 4 years 5 months)
  - Silas Mercer Parker (aged 32 years, killed) and wife, Lucinda Duty (aged approximately 34 years 11 months)
    - Cynthia Ann Parker (aged 8 years 7 months, captured)
    - John Richard Parker (aged approximately 5 years 11 months, captured)
    - Silas Mercer Parker (aged approximately 1 year 11 months)
    - Orlena Parker (aged approximately 11 months)
  - Elizabeth Duty Kellogg (aged approximately 39 years, captured)
- Elisha Anglin
  - Abram Anglin
- Seth Bates
  - Silas Bates
- George E.Dwight and wife Malinda Frost Dwight
  - Elizabeth Dwight
- David Falkenbury
  - Evan Falkenbury
- Samuel Frost (killed) and wife
  - Robert Frost (killed)
  - Other Frost children
- Oliver Lund

Note: Killed were Samuel Frost, Robert Frost, John Parker, Benjamin Parker and Silas Parker. Captured were Elizabeth Kellogg, Cynthia Parker, John Parker, Rachel Plummer and James Plummer; all of them were later ransomed or freed. Their captivity took several years, except Mrs. Kellogg, who was ransomed within 3 months. Another 21 were not captured.

== Aftermath ==
=== Cynthia Ann Parker ===
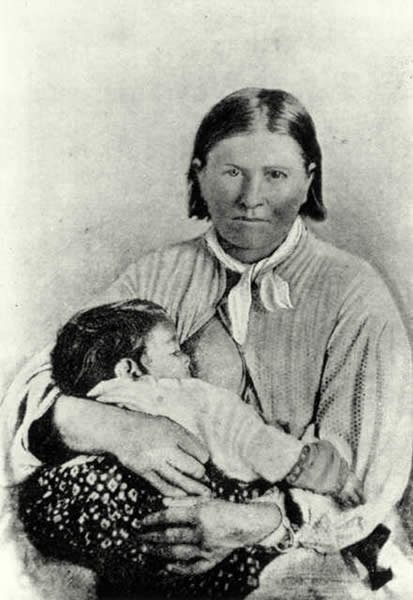
Cynthia Ann Parker with her daughter, Prairie Flower, about 1861

One of the captives was a nine-year-old girl, Cynthia Ann Parker, daughter of Silas and Lucinda Duty Parker. Cynthia Ann lived with the Comanches for nearly 25 years. She married Comanche chief Peta Nocona and was the mother of three children, including Quanah Parker. In 1860, she was among a Native American party captured by Texas Rangers at the Battle of Pease River. Ironically, Cynthia Parker was the victim of two massacres which destroyed her life. The first, the attack on Fort Parker in 1836, killed her father and left her among the Comanche for nearly 25 years. The second, a massacre of the Comanche Band of her husband, the Noconis, at the Battle of Pease River left her a prisoner among the whites. She was identified by her uncle, Isaac Parker, and returned to his home in Texas. Cynthia Ann never readjusted to the Anglo society, and died at the age of 43 in 1870 after starving herself to death after her daughter, Prairie Flower, had caught influenza and died from pneumonia. She was originally buried in Poyner, Henderson County, Texas, but her son, Quanah, had her reburied next to his future grave at his home, the Star House, in Cache, Oklahoma. In 1957 the State of Oklahoma moved their graves to Old Post Cemetery in Fort Sill, Commanche County, Oklahoma, on what is known as Chief's Knoll. In 1965 the state of Texas had Prairie Flower moved from her grave in Edom, Van Zandt County, Texas to join her mother and brother.

=== John Richard Parker ===
Cynthia Ann's brother John Richard Parker was ransomed back in 1842 along with his cousin, James Pratt Plummer. He was unable to adapt to white society and ran away, returning to the Comanche. During a Comanche raid into Mexico, he contracted smallpox, and the Comanche war party that he was a member of abandoned him, leaving a Mexican girl that they had captured to care for him. After she nursed him back to health, he returned her to her family and eventually married her, settling in Mexico and becoming a stockman and rancher. During the American Civil War, he served in a Mexican Company within the Confederate Army. After the war, he returned to his life in Mexico, living there until he died in 1915.

=== Rachel Plummer ===
Rachel Plummer, the 17-year-old wife of Luther Plummer, daughter of James Parker, and cousin to Cynthia Parker and her brother John, was held captive and enslaved by the Comanche for two years before being ransomed by her father. During captivity she gave birth, but the baby was soon tortured and murdered by her Comanche master because the child interfered with her work. Her book on her captivity, Rachael Plummer's Narrative of Twenty-One Months' Servitude as a Prisoner Among the Comanchee Indians, was issued in Houston in 1838. This was the first narrative about a captive of Texas Indians published in the Republic of Texas, and it was a sensation not just there, but throughout the United States and even abroad. Rachel died in 1840, in childbirth, a year after being ransomed.

=== James Pratt Plummer ===
James Pratt, son of Luther Martin Thomas Plummer and Rachel Parker Plummer, was separated from his mother (who never knew about his further fate) and was soon given away to another Comanche band. Late in 1842 he was ransomed and in 1843 reunited with his grandfather James W. Parker. Parker refused to return his grandson to his father, claiming that Luther Plummer had not even paid any money for his family's ransom. Even when the latter appealed successfully to the Governor of Texas, Parker refused to return his grandson. Luther Plummer later remarried and fathered another child, and then did not pursue the matter any further. James Pratt Plummer married twice and had four children. He enlisted in the Confederate Army during the Civil War and died from pneumonia in 1862 after suffering from typhoid.

=== Elizabeth Duty Kellogg ===
In late May 1836, Elizabeth Kellogg was taken by a band of Kichai Indians, which she took for "Kitchawas". In summer, Delaware Indians purchased Mrs. Kellogg and sold her to her brother-in-law James W. Parker in August 1836 for 150 dollars (the money was sent by Sam Houston). She was reunited with her sister Martha Duty on September 6, 1836. Her life after captivity lacks documentation, though it is known that she had died by 1861.

== People closely related to the fate of the captured inhabitants ==
=== James W. Parker ===
James W. Parker, who was working in the fields when the raid began, spent much of the rest of his life, and most of his fortune, searching for his daughter Rachel, his grandson James, his niece Cynthia, and his nephew John Richard. After many near-death escapes, he finally settled with his family. John Wayne's character Ethan Edwards, in the John Ford Western The Searchers, was modeled by author Alan Le May after Parker and others affected by child abductions.

Former Dallas Morning News columnist Frank X. Tolbert in his book An Informal History of Texas entitled one of his book's chapters "Was Uncle James (Parker) The Villain" which expressed an entirely different take on the reverend. James W. Parker was Cynthia Ann Parker's uncle, Rachel Plummer's father, and Rachel's son James Pratt Plummer's grandfather. Sam Houston responded to "Luther" Thomas Martin Plummer in a letter that: "Reverend Parker had quite a bad reputation with most all he ever had business dealings." Houston did not trust the judgement of Parker and as that chapter of Tolbert's book relates Houston just could not believe that Reverend Parker would not return James Pratt Plummer to his natural father.

=== Quanah Parker ===
Quanah Parker, son of Cynthia Ann Parker, became a leader among the Quahadi Comanches. After most of the Comanches and other tribes on the Staked Plains were defeated, Parker and his group surrendered to authorities and were forced to an Indian reservation in Oklahoma Territory. The Quahadis were the very last tribe left on the Staked Plains. Quanah Parker was made chief of all the Comanche tribes on the reservation. Shortly before his own death in 1911, he arranged for the disinterment of his mother and sister and had them reburied in a plot next to his own at the Post Oak Cemetery near Cache, Oklahoma. Congress passed a special allotment to fund the reburial. The three were moved in 1957 to the Old Post military cemetery in Fort Sill, Oklahoma.

== See also ==
- Killough massacre
- List of massacres in the United States
- List of Indian massacres
