= Battle of Pease River =

Raid against Comanche Indians by Texas Rangers and militia

Battle of Pease River/Pease River Massacre
- Part of the American Indian Wars
Date	December 19, 1860
Location	Near the Pease River (now Foard County, Texas, United States) 34°4′11.30″N 99°35′42.32″W
Result	Noconi camp massacred; recovery of Naduah, or Cynthia Ann Parker (Na'ura)

Belligerents
Texas Rangers, Militia	Comanche Noconi Band

Commanders and leaders
Lawrence Sullivan "Sul" Ross	Peta Nocona* (Note: reportedly killed by Sul Ross, but his son Quanah Parker stated he died several years later. Quanah once wrote "...Col. Wilbur S. Nye personally met Peta Nocona time after the Pease River's fight and his claimed death". Quanah Parker's claim is supported by his contemporary, the Texas historian John Henry Brown.)(disputed)

Strength
60 men	Unknown at least 20 in the band, including 16 unarmed Comanche women and 2 children

Casualties and losses
3 reported.	All but three killed; Naduah, or Cynthia Ann Parker, was captured with her infant daughter, Topʉsana (Prairie Flower)
- Location within Texas

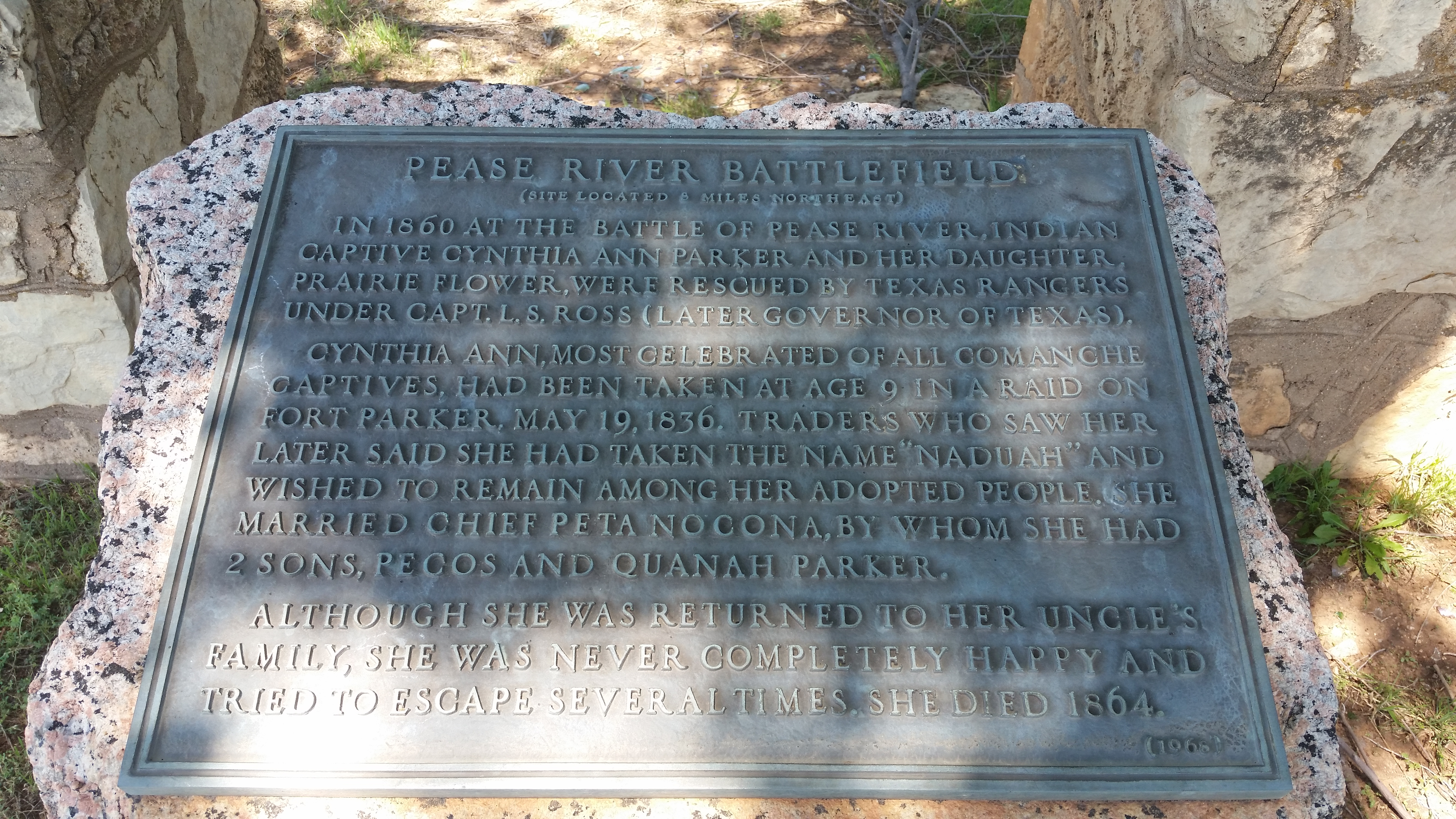
Texas historical marker in Crowell, Texas

The Battle of Pease River occurred on December 19, 1860, near present-day Margaret, Texas in Foard County, Texas, United States. The town is located between Crowell and Vernon within sight of the Medicine Mounds just outside present-day Quanah, Texas.

A monument marks the site where a group of Comanche Indians were massacred by a detachment of Texas Rangers and militia under Ranger Captain "Sul" Ross. The Indian camp was attacked as retaliation against recent Comanche attacks on settlers.

This raid is primarily remembered as the place where Cynthia Ann Parker was recovered after she had been captured in the Fort Parker massacre, 24 years earlier.

== Cynthia Ann Parker ==
Cynthia Ann Parker was a woman of European descent who had been kidnapped as a child by the Comanche in the Fort Parker massacre in 1836. The nine-year-old Parker had grown up among the Comanche, who called her "Na'ura". She married and had three children with war chief Peta Nocona. Nonetheless, the Rangers and her family had never given up hope of regaining her. Her uncle, James Parker, had spent most of his adult life, and his fortune, in a fruitless search for her.

Her presence and “rescue”/re-capture at Pease River was a matter of national importance, probably because, as Ross was quoted as saying in the book Indian Depredations, by J.W. Wilbarger, "Most families on the frontier had lost someone to the Indians. Cynthia Ann's recovery would be looked at as almost a miracle by those folks". The famous picture of her with her daughter Topʉsana at her breast was carried in almost every paper in the country.

== Peta Nocona ==
The greatly feared Comanche war chief Peta Nocona was a son of a chief of the Quahadi band of the Comanche. He was known as the Wanderer, or possibly wanderer as in "outcast", or "he who wanders far and returns". Peta Nocona was one of the war chiefs present at the attack on Fort Parker, and had formed his own band of the Comanche called the Nokoni. They occupied territory along the Red River. Nocona married and had three children with Cynthia Ann Parker. Their first child, Quanah Parker, was born some time around 1850.

== The assault ==
In early 1860 Peta Nocona led the Comanches in a raid through Parker County, Texas, which ironically was named in honor of his wife's family. After the raid he returned with his band to what he believed was a safe retreat under the sandstone bluffs of Pease River near where Mule Creek flowed into the stream. The site was long a favorite of the Comanche, providing both cover from the fierce blue northers that hit the plains, and ample forage for their ponies, with easy buffalo hunting from the nearby herds. But the raids of the Comanche had brought pressure in Austin to protect the settlers, and Texas Governor Sam Houston had commissioned Ranger Captain Sul Ross to organize a company of 40 Rangers and 20 militia to put a stop to the Indian raids. The company of 60 was based at Fort Belknap, in Young County.

Sul Ross quickly ascertained that he simply did not have sufficient men to guard the frontier, and instead determined that the best way to protect the settlers was to take the offensive to the Indians at the earliest opportunity. In preparation, he began to scout the area for sign of Indian camps. After Peta Nocona's raid into Parker County, Sul Ross and his fighters started tracking the band of Nokoni Comanche, who were considered the hardiest fighters among the Comanche, who were in turn considered the fiercest of the Plains Indians.

Modern research has revealed that Peta Nocona did not intend to stay at Pease River, and was preparing to move on when the attack came on his camp that December day. It was daybreak on December 19, 1860, when Ranger Captain Sul Ross himself scouted out the camp on the Pease River as his scouts reported the presence of a fairly large hunting party and camp on the banks of the Pease. With an oncoming blue northern blotting out sign, Ross was able to move up to spy out the location of the Noconi on the Mule Creek head bank as it came into the Pease River.

Ross sent a detachment of 20 men out of his force of 60 to position themselves behind a chain of sand hills to cut off retreat to the northwest, while with 40 men, Ross himself led the charge down into the Indian camp. The result was that the band was taken completely by surprise and were either killed in the camp or by the 20 men to the north as they attempted to flee. Sul Ross wrote, quoted in Indian Depredations, by J.W. Wilbarger, that they fired at everyone present, saying "The attack was so sudden that a considerable number were killed before they could prepare for defense. They fled precipitately right into the presence of the sergeant and his men. Here they met with a warm reception, and finding themselves completely encompassed, every one fled his own way, and was hotly pursued and hard pressed".

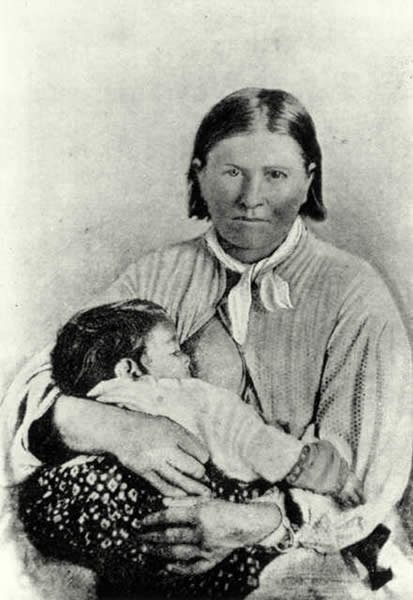
Cynthia Ann Parker and her daughter in 1861 after being taken at Pease River, in a picture which was famous all over the United States

There are two distinct and very different stories about Peta Nocona's death. The first is that he died trying to escape with his wife and infant daughter, which is the generally believed story, and the one reported by Sul Ross officially. According to this story, seeing that the camp was hopelessly overrun, Chief Peta Nocona and Cynthia Ann Parker fled to the east up a creek bed. Reportedly, mounted behind Nocona was a 15-year-old Mexican girl, while Cynthia Ann Parker carried her two-year-old child, Topʉsana ("Prairie Flower"). Captain Ross and his lieutenant, Tom Killiheir, pursued the man they believed to be the legendary Peta Nocona. But Quanah Parker, the chief's oldest son, once reportedly said in Dallas to Sul Ross, "No kill my father; he not there. I want to get it straight here in Texas history. After that, two year, three year maybe, my father sick. I see him die".

In the popular account recollected by Sul Ross and first printed in James T. DeShields' 1886 book Cynthia Ann Parker, after a chase of a mile (1.6 km) or so, he and Ranger Tom Killiheir hotly pursued a man they thought was a chief from his headdress, who had a second Indian on the back of his pony, and a second pony with a woman carrying a small infant. The Rangers pulled up and either (Ross claimed he shot the man, Killiheir said he did, one of the two shot the second Indian on the back of the chief's pony. It turned out to be a Mexican girl on the back of Nocona's pony, and both white men would later claim that they did not know she was a girl, with only her head showing out of the buffalo robe. She was killed instantly by the shot, and as she died, pulled the chief, supposedly Peta Nocona, off the horse. The Comanche chief recovered and began to fire arrows at the approaching Ross, one striking the horse on which the Ranger captain was mounted. One shot from Ross's pistols reportedly broke Nocona's arm, while two other shots reportedly hit his body. Apparently mortally wounded, Nocona managed to drag himself to a small tree and bracing himself against it began to chant the Comanche death song. Captain Ross's Mexican-born servant, Antonio Martinez, who spoke Comanche, and reportedly had been taken captive as a child by Nocona, approached the dying warrior and spoke to him in the Comanche language. As an interpreter for Captain Ross, Antonio Martinez told Nocona to surrender. The fierce Comanche's response was a dying attempt to hurl a lance at the Ranger leader. His family captured—except for his son Quanah, who had escaped the slaughter—and his warriors dead or dying, their families dead or prisoners, Nocona was executed on the spot by a shotgun wielded by Martinez, while the woman supposedly screamed his name and wept.

The popular account of the Battle of Pease River is called into question by conflicting accounts from participants including Ross himself. There is evidence in his later correspondence that Ross was aware of the political advantages conferred by widely held perceptions about his role in the incident at Pease River. The record also indicates his own version of the story changed over time, generally casting his involvement in a more positive and grandiose light.

Once he had come into the reservation, and the topic arose with him, Quanah Parker adamantly denied that the man killed when his mother was recovered/recaptured was his father. Further, Quanah Parker had told his fellow warriors for years that his father had made good his escape from Pease River, and had died years later. Quanah said that he and his father, along with a few others, had left the camp late the night before to go hunting, and thus were not present the morning of the attack on their warband, and when they returned, virtually no adults were left alive to tell him or his father exactly what had taken place, or what had become of his wife and two youngest children. Not knowing whether his wife and youngest children were even alive, Peta Nocona made the hard decision to flee, in order to assure the safety of his remaining son. According to Quanah, Ross did not know who the man he killed was, and his father was away with him, and virtually all the warriors when the attack occurred, and lived four more years, before old battle wounds finally killed him.

It must be also noted that a rare book from that period supports Quanah's claim that his father did not die at Pease River. In a book decades out of print, written in 1890, Carbine & Lance, The Story of Old Fort Sill, by Colonel W.S. Nye, the Colonel buttresses Quanah's version of the story. Ney says: "Accounts vary as to what happened. Captain Ross, who was acclaimed a hero for the deed, claimed and probably honestly believed that he had caught and killed Peta Nacona. But in the melee he pursued and shot Nawkohnee's Mexican slave, who was trying to save the fleeing Comanche women". Nye claimed that he encountered men who saw Nocona alive several years after the Pease River fight, when he was ill with an infected war wound. This version strongly supports Quanah's claim that his father survived Pease River, and died three to four years later of an infected wound. A 2012 book, Myth, Memory and Massacre: The Pease River Capture of Cynthia Ann Parker by Texas Tech University history professor emeritus, Paul H. Carlson and Tom Crum debunks most of the material in the apparently politically inspired 1886 book of James T. Deshields. They also document the primary sources who verify that Peta Nocona was not at the scene of the massacre and died around 1865, not December 1860.

== Aftermath ==
At first Ross believed the woman he had captured was an American Indian woman. Some accounts say Martinez noticed her blue eyes, a rare trait for a native Comanche, and as the woman was questioned, she pointed at herself and said "me Cynthia". There were many claims as to who rescued Cynthia. Martinez claimed he identified her by her hair and eyes, as did Killhair. Another version, that of Sul Ross, in his official report on the battle wrote of identifying Cynthia Ann Parker, again quoted in Indian Depredations, by J.W. Wilbarger: 'Why, Tom, this is a white woman, Indians do not have blue eyes.'

When Ross returned to Fort Belknap, Ross sent at once for Isaac Parker, a brother of Silas Parker and uncle to Cynthia Ann, who lived near Weatherford, Texas, but he was unable to positively identify this frail captive as his niece. Alas, though her remembered few words of English finally convinced Parker she was his niece, her travails had only begun. Although Cynthia Ann was lovingly cared for by her white family, she was unhappy in her new surroundings. Topʉsana died of influenza in 1864, followed shortly by her mother, who starved herself to death. Cynthia Ann already was in mourning for her sons when her daughter died, leaving her without a reason to live. According to her neighbors "She thought her sons were lost on the prairie after she was captured. She would take a knife and slash her breasts until they bled and then put the blood on some tobacco and burn it and cry for hours".

Ironically, of Cynthia Ann's two sons, both escaped the Battle of Pease River, but one died later before he could be returned to his mother. Charles Goodnight, the famous scout and later rancher, found the sign of two horses who had trotted at a normal trot out of the camp for about a mile, then taken off at a dead run to the nearest large Comanche camp. Goodnight trailed the horses 50 miles to that camp, but as it had more than 1,000 Comanche present, and he had less than a dozen men with him, he abandoned the chase. Later in life, Quanah told Goodnight he was one of those horsemen, and his brother was the other. Though his brother died, Quanah became a famous chieftain among the Comanches, indeed, he was the last of their war chiefs. Quanah Parker, the last Comanche war chief, at the end of his life would see his mother and sister's remains disinterred, and reburied beside him at Fort Sill. John Wesley of Foard County, Texas, in 1880, acquired the land upon which the fight had taken place, along Mule Creek. In 1918 he wrote "I became acquainted with Quanah Parker in 1882 or 1883 and met him quite often in Vernon where he and members of his tribe came to trade. He was very friendly and wanted to know all about his kinfolks in Parker County. He asked me to visit him at Fort Sill and I in return asked him to visit me, but he said he never went to Mule Creek because his father was killed there and his mother sister were captured and carried off. He said he never wanted to see the place".

== See also ==
- Cynthia Ann Parker
- Fort Parker massacre
- Peta Nocona
- Quanah Parker
