= Fort Parker State Park =

State park in Texas, United States

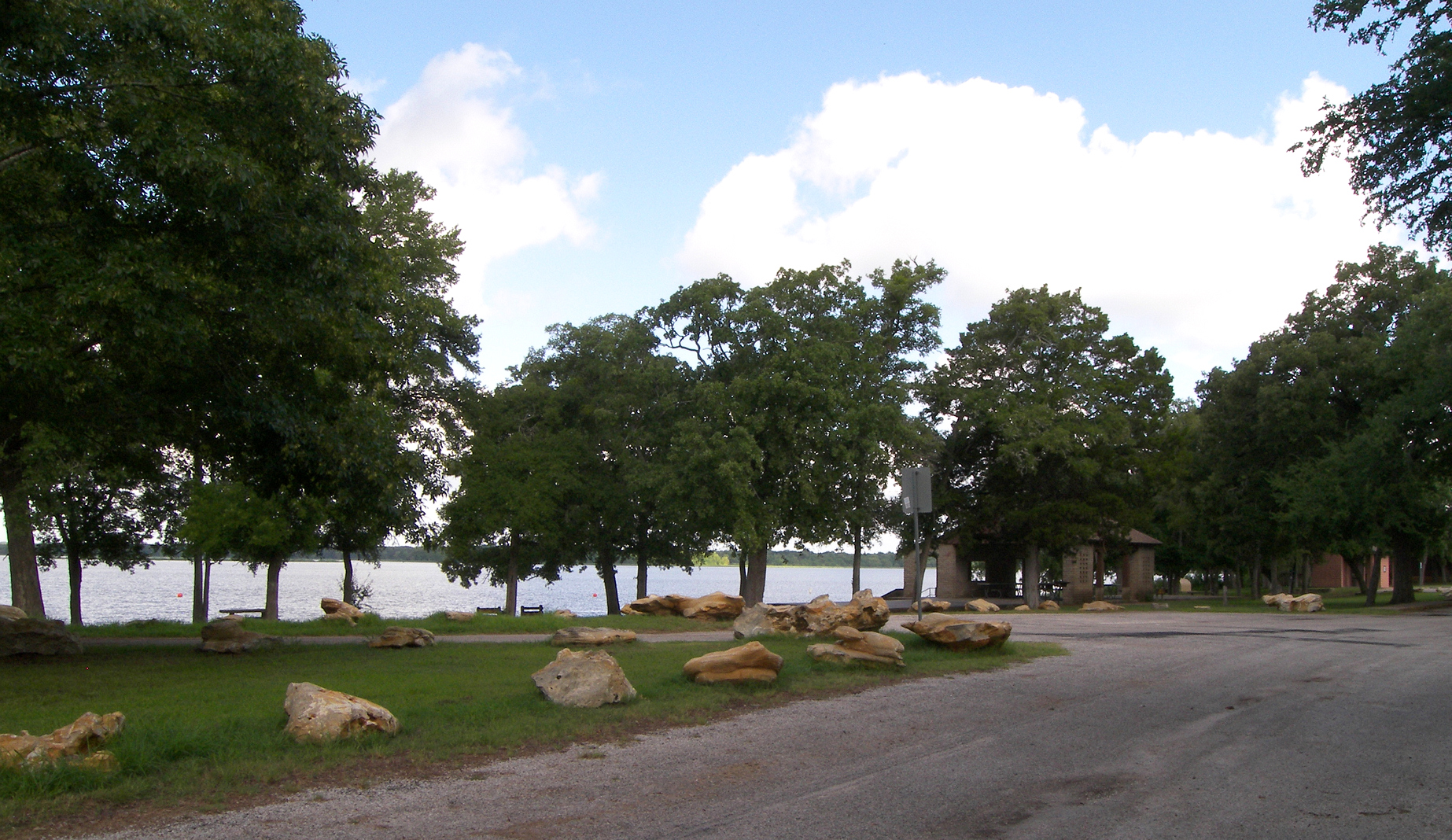
- Fort Parker State Park

- Location within Texas Location within the United States
- Location: Limestone County, Texas
- Nearest city: Mexia, Texas
- Coordinates: 31°36′13″N 96°33′03″W
- Area: 1,458.8 acres (590.4 ha)
- Established: 1941; 85 years ago
- Visitors: 48,986 (in 2025)
- Governing body: Texas Parks and Wildlife Department
- Website: Official site

Fort Parker State Park is a 1,458.8-acre (590.4 ha) state park in Limestone County, Texas, United States near the City of Mexia. The park is named after Fort Parker, the site of the Fort Parker massacre in 1836. The park opened in 1941 and is administered by the Texas Parks and Wildlife Department.

== History ==
The city of Mexia and three local landowners donated the land creating the park in 1935. From 1935 to 1942, Civilian Conservation Corps Company 3807(C) built roads, recreational facilities, the concession building and a 423-foot (129 m) dam of limestone, concrete, and soil across the Navasota River, creating Lake Fort Parker. The park was dedicated by former Texas Governor Pat Neff and opened to the public in May 1941.

Inside the park is the Old Springfield Cemetery, all that remains of the once-thriving community of Springfield, Texas. Springfield was once the county seat of Limestone County and thrived during the 1840s and 1850s, but as men left for the Civil War, the town's businesses began to close. After the war, racial conflict and lawlessness occurred. The railroad passed Springfield by for the towns of Mexia and Groesbeck, and the town of Springfield disappeared.

== Nature ==
=== Animals ===
Fort Parker State Park is home to common Texas wildlife like white-tailed deer, raccoons, and fox squirrels, along with more elusive species such as coyotes, bobcats. Visitors can also observe North American river otters, American beavers, nutria and Texas river cooters in the water. A variety of birds are spotted, including American white pelican, turkey vulture, eastern bluebird, northern cardinal, red-bellied woodpecker, American coot and even a nesting pair of bald eagles. There is an active great blue heron rookery at Fort Parker Lake. Popular fish in the taken from the lake include largemouth bass, white bass, channel catfish, blue catfish and crappie.

=== Plants ===
Trees in the park include bur oak, water oak, American basswood, blackjack oak, pecan, hackberry, eastern red cedar (juniper), youpon holly and eastern redbud. Other plants that can be found are American beautyberry, Turk's cap, poison ivy and sumac.

== Activities ==
The Fort Parker Nature Center is open every weekend. Canoes, kayaks, and paddleboats are available for rental. Day use, overnight camping, group barracks, an activity center, and a picnic pavilion are all available for rent. Visitors enjoy swimming, fishing, camping, picnicking, birdwatching, and geocaching.

For hiking and cycling, Fort Parker State Park has four hike-and-bike trails; Springfield trail (1.8-mile loop), Navasota River Trail (1.9 mile one way), River Loop (.9-mile loop) and Baines Creek Trail (2.5 miles one way). Bur Oak Trail (0.5-mile loop hiking only) is a nature trail with an interpretive guide pamphlet available. For paddling there is one paddling trail, Limestone Bluffs Paddling Trail (10.8-mile loop).

== Old Fort Parker ==
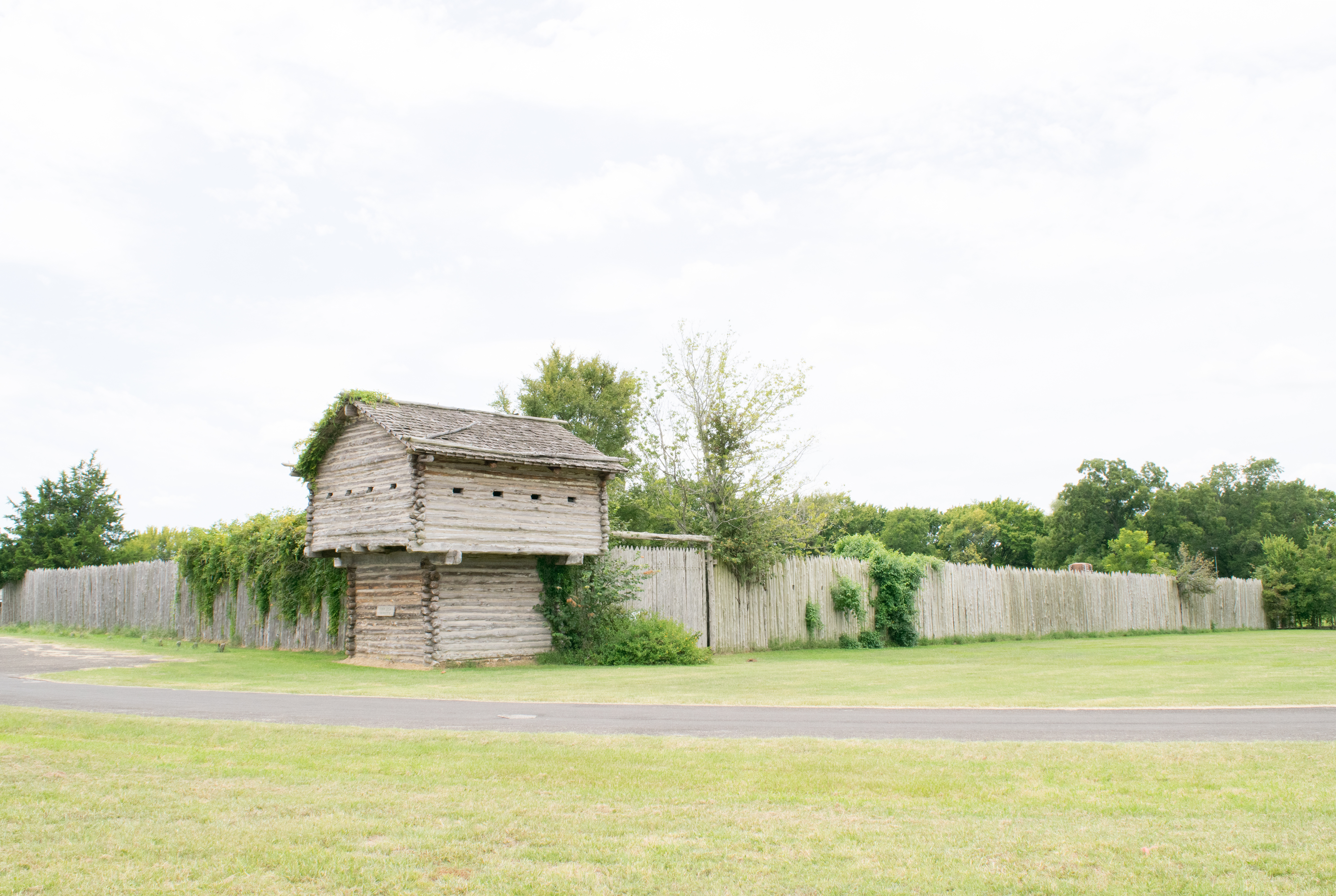
Old Fort Parker Blockhouse

The CCC Company also rebuilt nearby Old Fort Parker, the site of the Fort Parker massacre, for the Texas Centennial observance in 1936. As an independent nonprofit, Old Fort Parker is not part of the state park.

== See also ==
- List of Texas state parks
