= Quanah Parker =

Euro-Indigenous American leader, Comanche (c. 1845–1912)

- Kwana
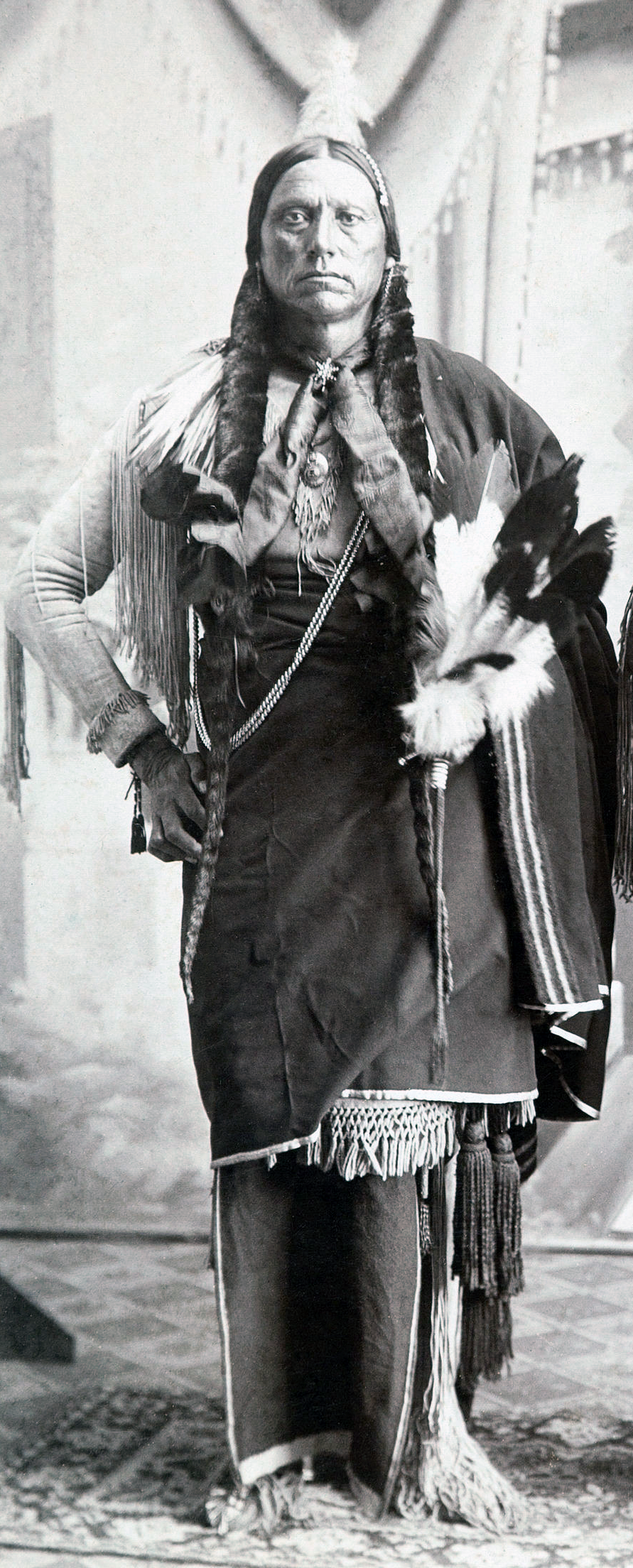
- Quanah Parker, c. 1890

Comanche Nation United States Chief of the Comanches
- In office 1890–1911
- Preceded by: Position established
- Succeeded by: Position abolished

Personal details
- Born: 1845 or (probably, Pecos' birth) 1852 Elk Valley, Wichita Mountains, Comancheria (Oklahoma)
- Died: February 23, 1911 Quanah Parker Star House; Cache, Oklahoma, U.S.
- Cause of death: Heart failure
- Resting place: Fort Sill Post Cemetery; Fort Sill, Oklahoma
- Spouse(s): Weakeah, Chony, Mah-Chetta-Wookey, Ah-Uh-Wuth-Takum, Coby, Tópee, Tonarcy
- Relations: Po-bish-e-quasho "Iron Jacket", John Parker, James W. Parker, Daniel Parker, John Richard Parker
- Parents: Peta Nocona; Cynthia Ann Parker
- Known for: Comanche leader to bring the Kwahadi people into Fort Sill; Founder of the Native American Church; The last Comanche chief

Quanah Parker (Comanche: Kwana, lit. 'smell, odor'; c. 1845 – February 23, 1911) was a Euro-Indigenous American war leader of the Kwahadi ("Antelope") band of the Comanche Nation. He was likely born into the Nokoni ("Wanderers") band of Tabby-nocca and grew up among the Kwahadis, the son of Kwahadi Comanche chief Peta Nocona and Cynthia Ann Parker, an Anglo-American who had been abducted as a nine-year-old child during the Fort Parker massacre in 1836 and assimilated into the Nokoni tribe. Following the apprehension of several Kiowa chiefs in 1871, Quanah Parker emerged as a dominant figure in the Red River War, clashing repeatedly with Colonel Ranald S. Mackenzie. With European-Americans hunting American bison, the Comanches' primary sustenance, into near extinction, Quanah Parker eventually surrendered and peaceably led the Kwahadi to the reservation at Fort Sill, Oklahoma.

Quanah Parker was never elected chief by his people but was appointed by the federal government as principal chief of the entire Comanche Nation. He became a primary emissary of southwest Native Americans to the United States legislature. In civilian life, he gained wealth as a rancher, settling near Cache, Oklahoma. Though he encouraged Christianization of Comanche people, he also advocated the syncretic Native American Church alternative, and fought for the legal use of peyote in the movement's religious practices. He was elected deputy sheriff of Lawton in 1902. After his death in 1911, the leadership title of Chief was replaced with chairman; Quanah Parker is thereby described as the "Last Chief of the Comanche", a term also applied to Horseback.

He is buried at Chief's Knoll on Fort Sill. Many cities and highway systems in southwest Oklahoma and north Texas, once southern Comancheria, bear reference to his name.

== Early life ==
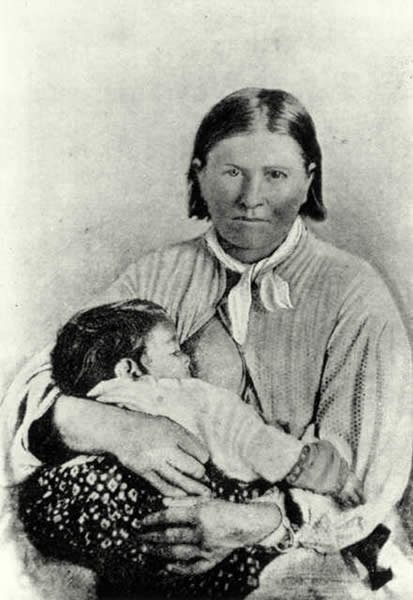
Cynthia Ann Parker and her daughter, Topʉsana (Prairie Flower), in 1861

He was of Euro-Indigenous American descent. Quanah Parker's mother, Cynthia Ann Parker (born c. 1827), was a member of the large Parker frontier family that settled in east Texas in the 1830s. She was captured in 1836 (c. age eight) by Comanches during the raid of Fort Parker near present-day Groesbeck, Texas. Given the Comanche name Narua (Foundling), she was adopted into the Nokoni band of Comanches, as foster daughter of Tabby-nocca. Assimilated into the Comanche, Cynthia Ann Parker married the Kwahadi warrior chief Peta Nocona, also known as Puhtocnocony, Noconie, Tah-con-ne-ah-pe-ah, or Nocona ("Lone Wanderer").

Quanah Parker's paternal grandfather was the Kwahadi chief Iron Jacket (Puhihwikwasu'u), a warrior of the earlier Comanche-American Wars, famous among his people for wearing a Spanish coat of mail.

Cynthia Ann Parker and Nocona's first child was Quanah Parker, born in the Wichita Mountains of southwestern Oklahoma. In a letter to rancher Charles Goodnight, Quanah Parker writes, "From the best information I have, I was born about 1850 on Elk Creek just below the Wichita Mountains." Alternative sources cite his birthplace as Laguna Sabinas/Cedar Lake in Gaines County, Texas.

Cynthia Ann Parker and Nocona also had another son, Pecos (Pecan), and a daughter, Topʉ̠sana (Topsana or Prairie Flower). In December 1860, Cynthia Ann Parker and Topʉ̠sana were captured during the Pease River Massacre. American forces were led by Sgt. John Spangler, who commanded Company H of the U.S. 2nd Cavalry, and Texas Rangers under Sul Ross would claim that at the end of the battle, he wounded Peta Nocona, who was thereafter killed by Spangler's Mexican servant but this was disputed by eyewitnesses among the Texas Rangers and by Quanah Parker. It was believed that Quanah Parker and his brother Pecos were the only two to have escaped on horseback, and were tracked by Ranger Charles Goodnight but escaped to rendezvous with other Nokoni. Some, including Quanah Parker himself, claim this story is false and that he, his brother, and his father Peta Nocona were not at the battle, that they were at the larger camp miles away, and that Peta Nocona died years later of illness caused by wounds from battles with Apache.

Cynthia Ann Parker, along with her infant daughter Topʉ̠sana, were taken by the Texas Rangers against her will to her brother's home. After 24 years with the Comanche, Parker refused re-assimilation. Topʉ̠sana died of an illness in 1863. Parker died by suicide through voluntary starvation in March 1871.

In the Comanche language, kwana means "an odor" or "a smell". Comanche warriors often took on more active, masculine names in maturity, but Quanah Parker retained the name his mother gave him, initially in tribute to her after her recapture.

== Career ==
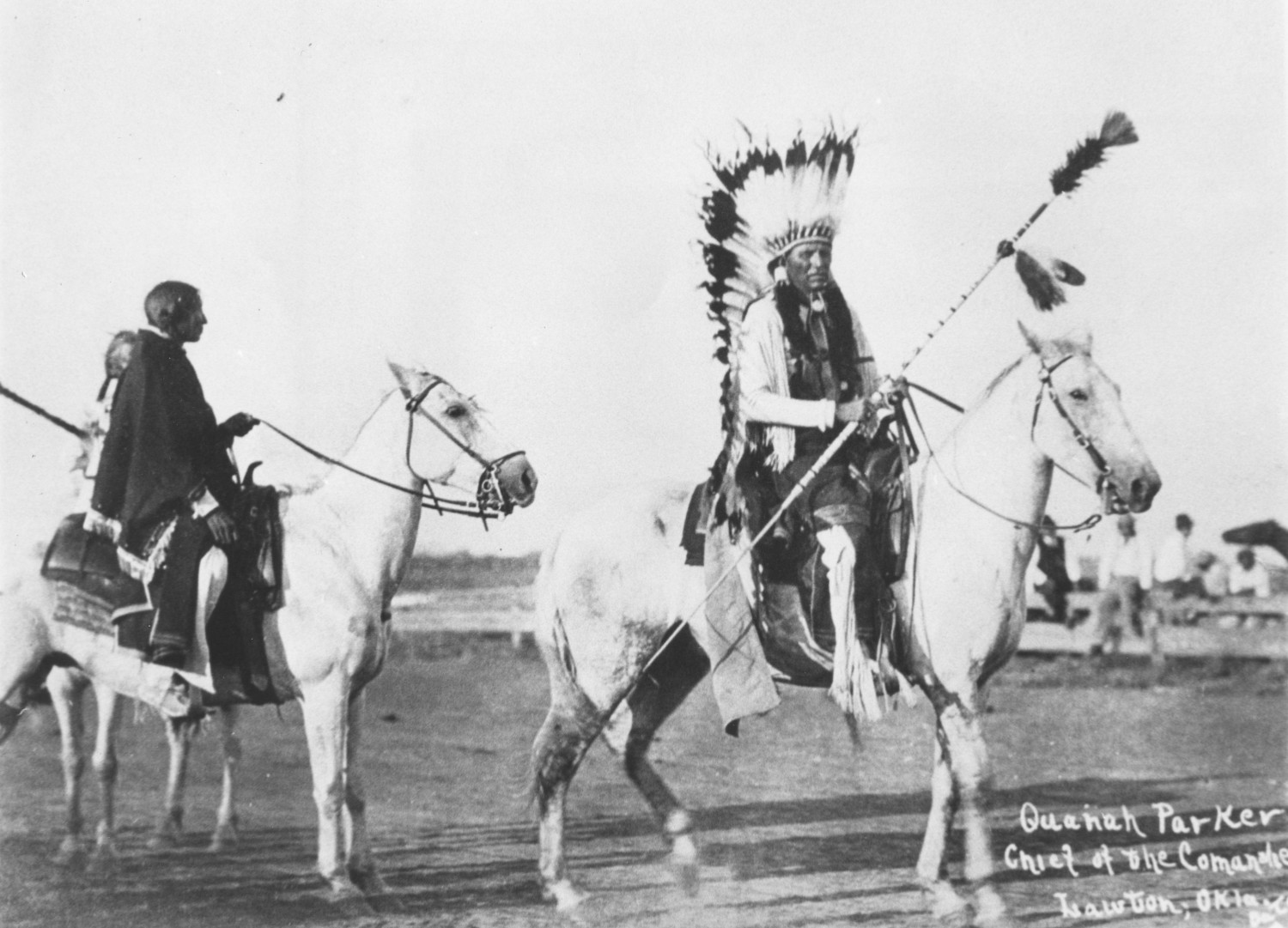
Quanah Parker on horseback wearing eagle feather headdress and holding a lance bottom-up. Late 1800s

After Peta Nocona's death (c. 1864), being now Parʉa Kuhma ("Bull Bear") the head chief of the Kwahadi people, Tʉhʉya Kwahipʉ (Horseback), the head chief of the Nokoni people, took young Quanah Parker and his brother Pecos under his wing. After Peta Nocona and Iron Jacket, Horseback taught them the ways of the Comanche warrior, and Quanah Parker grew to considerable standing as a warrior. He left and rejoined the Kwahadi band with warriors from another band. Quanah Parker surrendered to Mackenzie and was taken to Fort Sill, Indian Territory, where he led the Comanches successfully for a number of years on the reservation. Quanah Parker was never elected principal chief of the Comanche by the tribe. The U.S. government appointed him principal chief of the entire nation once the people had gathered on the reservation and later introduced general elections.

In October 1867, when Quanah Parker was a young man, he had come along with the Comanche chiefs as an observer at treaty negotiations at Medicine Lodge, Kansas. Horseback made a statement about Quanah Parker's refusal to sign the treaty. In the early 1870s, the Plains Indians were losing the battle for their land with the United States government. Following the capture of the Kiowa chiefs Sitting Bear, Big Tree, and Satanta, the last two paroled in 1873 after two years thanks to the firm and stubborn behaviour of Guipago, the Kiowa, Comanche, and Southern Cheyenne tribes joined forces in several battles. Colonel Ranald Mackenzie led U.S. Army forces in rounding up or killing the remaining Indians who had not settled on reservations.

In 1873, Kwihnai Tosaabitʉ, a Comanche claiming to be a medicine man, called for all the Comanche bands to gather together for a Sun Dance, even though that ritual was Kiowa, and was not a Comanche practice. The bands gathered in May on the Red River, near present-day Texola, Oklahoma. At that gathering, Kwihnai Tosaabitʉ and Quanah Parker recruited warriors for raids into Texas to avenge slain relatives. Other Comanche chiefs, notably Isatosa (Isa-Rosa or "White Wolf") and Tabe Nanaka (Tabananika or "Sound of the Sunrise") of the Yamparika, and Piarʉ Ekarʉhkapʉ (Big Red Meat) of the Nokoni band, identified the buffalo hide merchants as the real threat to their way of life. They suggested that if Quanah Parker were to attack anybody, he should attack the merchants. A war party of around 250 warriors, composed mainly of Comanches and Cheyennes, who were impressed by Kwihnai Tosaabitʉ's claim of protective medicine to protect them from their enemies' bullets, headed into Texas towards the trading post of Adobe Walls. The raid should have been a slaughter, but the saloonkeeper had heard about the coming raid and kept his customers from going to bed by offering free drinks. Around 4 am, the raiders drove down into the valley. Quanah Parker and his band were unable to penetrate the two-foot thick sod walls and were repelled by the hide merchants' long-range .50 caliber Sharps rifles. As they retreated, Quanah Parker's horse was shot out from under him at five hundred yards. He hid behind a buffalo carcass, and was hit by a bullet that ricocheted off a powder horn around his neck and lodged between his shoulder blade and his neck. The wound was not serious, and Quanah Parker was rescued and brought back out of the range of the buffalo guns.

The attack on Adobe Walls caused a reversal of policy in Washington. It led to the Red River War, which culminated in a decisive Army victory in the Battle of Palo Duro Canyon. On September 28, 1874, Mackenzie and his Tonkawa scouts razed the Comanche village at Palo Duro Canyon and killed nearly 1,500 Comanche horses, the main form of the Comanche wealth and power.

== On the reservation ==
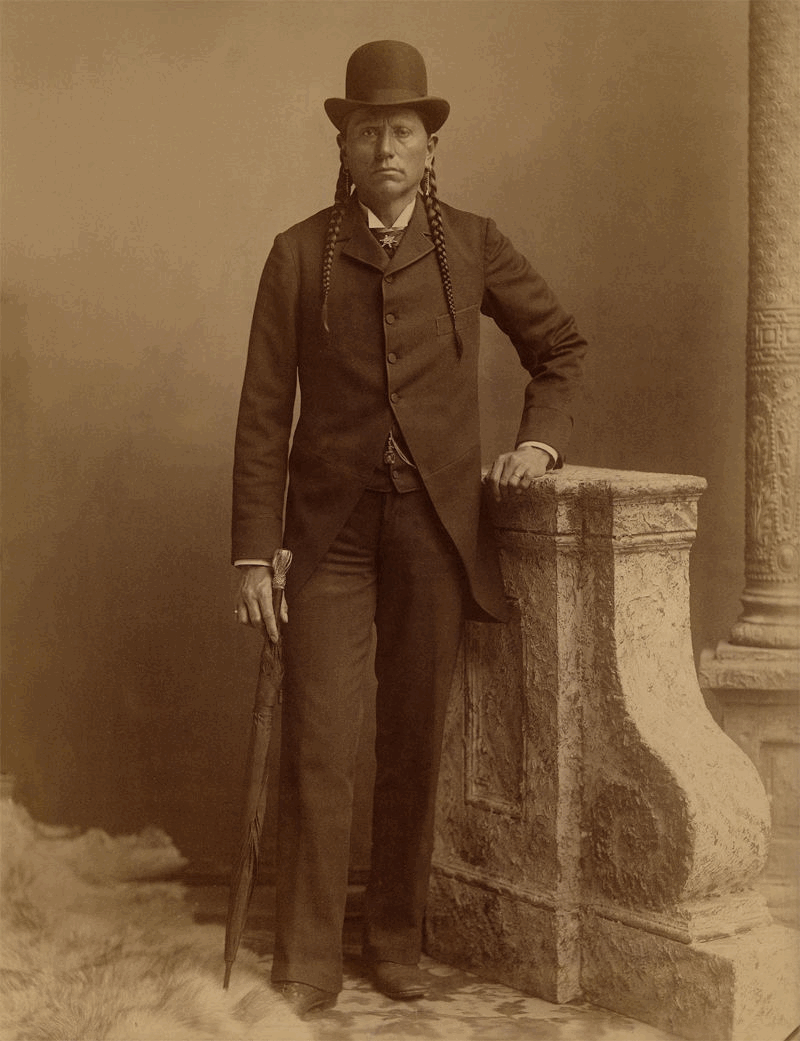
Parker in December 1889 wearing European-American business attire

With their food source depleted, and under constant pressure from the army, the Kwahadi Comanche finally surrendered in 1875. With Colonel Mackenzie and Indian Agent James M. Hayworth, Parker helped settle the Comanche on the Kiowa-Comanche-Apache Reservation in southwestern Indian Territory.

Quanah Parker's home in Cache, Oklahoma was called the Star House.

Parker went on hunting trips with President Theodore Roosevelt, who often visited him. Nevertheless, he rejected both monogamy and traditional Protestant Christianity in favor of the Native American Church Movement. He conducted peyote ceremonies on the reservation.

== Samuel Burk Burnett ==
The story of the friendship that grew between Quanah Parker and the Burnett family is addressed in the exhibition of cultural artifacts that were given to the Burnett family from the Parker family. The presentation of a cultural relic as significant as Quanah Parker's war lance was not done lightly. It is a clear indication of the high esteem to which the Burnett family was regarded by the Parkers. The correspondence between Quanah Parker and Samuel Burk Burnett, Sr. (1849–1922) and his son Thomas Loyd Burnett (1871–1938), expressed mutual admiration and respect. The historical record mentions little of Quanah Parker until his presence in the attack on the buffalo hunters at Adobe Walls on June 27, 1874. Fragmented information exists indicating Quanah Parker had interactions with the Apache at about this time.

This association may have related to his taking up the Native American Church, or peyote religion. Quanah Parker was said to have taken an Apache wife, but their union was short-lived. The Apache dress, bag and staff in the exhibit may be a remnant of this time in Quanah Parker's early adult life. With the buffalo nearly exterminated and having suffered heavy loss of horses and lodges at the hands of the US military, Quanah Parker was one of the leaders to bring the Kwahadi (Antelope) band of Comanches into Fort Sill during late May and early June 1875. This brought an end to their nomadic life on the southern plains and the beginning of an adjustment to more sedentary life. Burk Burnett began moving cattle from South Texas in 1874 to near present-day Wichita Falls, Texas. There he established his ranch headquarters in 1881. Changing weather patterns and severe drought caused grasslands to wither and die in Texas. Burnett and other ranchers met with Comanche and Kiowa tribes to lease land on their reservation—nearly 1 million acres (400,000 ha) just north of the Red River in Oklahoma.

Quanah Parker, like many of his contemporaries, was originally opposed to the opening of tribal lands for grazing by Anglo ranching interests. Quanah Parker changed his position and forged close relationships with a number of Texas cattlemen, such as Charles Goodnight and the Burnett family. As early as 1880, Quanah Parker was working with these new associates in building his own herds. In 1884, due largely to Quanah Parker's efforts, the tribes received their first "grass" payments for grazing rights on Comanche, Kiowa and Apache lands. It is during this period that the bonds between Quanah Parker and the Burnett family grew strong.

Burnett ran 10,000 cattle until the end of the lease in 1902. The cattle baron had a strong feeling for Native American rights, and his respect for them was genuine. Where other cattle kings fought natives and the harsh land to build empires, Burnett learned Comanche ways, passing both the love of the land and his friendship with the natives to his family. As a sign of their regard for Burnett, the Comanches gave him a name in their own language: Mas-sa-suta, meaning "Big Boss". Quanah Parker earned the respect of US governmental leaders as he adapted to the white man's life and became a prosperous rancher in Oklahoma. His spacious, two-story Star House had a bedroom for each of his seven wives and their children. He had his own private quarters, which were rather plain. Beside his bed were photographs of his mother Cynthia Ann Parker and younger sister Topʉsana. Quanah Parker extended hospitality to many influential people, both Native American and European American. Among the latter were the Texas surveyor W. D. Twichell and the cattleman Charles Goodnight.

During the next 27 years Quanah Parker and the Burnetts shared many experiences. Burnett helped by contributing money for the construction of Star House, Quanah Parker's large frame home. Burnett asked for (and received) Quanah Parker's participation in a parade with a large group of warriors at the Fort Worth Fat Stock Show and other public events. The "Parade" lance depicted in the exhibit was usually carried by Quanah Parker at such public gatherings. Burnett assisted Quanah Parker in buying the granite headstones used to mark the graves of his mother and sister. After years of searching, Quanah Parker had their remains moved from Texas and reinterred in 1910 in Oklahoma on the Comanche reservation at Fort Sill.

According to his daughter "Wanada" Page Parker, her father helped celebrate President Theodore Roosevelt's 1905 inauguration by appearing in the parade. In April 1905, Roosevelt visited Quanah Parker at the Star House. President Roosevelt and Quanah Parker went wolf hunting together with Burnett near Frederick, Oklahoma. During the occasion, the two discussed serious business. Quanah Parker wanted the tribe to retain ownership of 400,000 acres (1,600 km^{2}) that the government planned to sell off to homesteaders, an argument he eventually lost. Quanah Parker asked for help combating unemployment among his people and later received a letter from the President stating his own concern about the issue. The wolf hunt was believed to be one of the reasons that Roosevelt created the Wichita Mountains Wildlife Refuge.

== Marriage and family ==
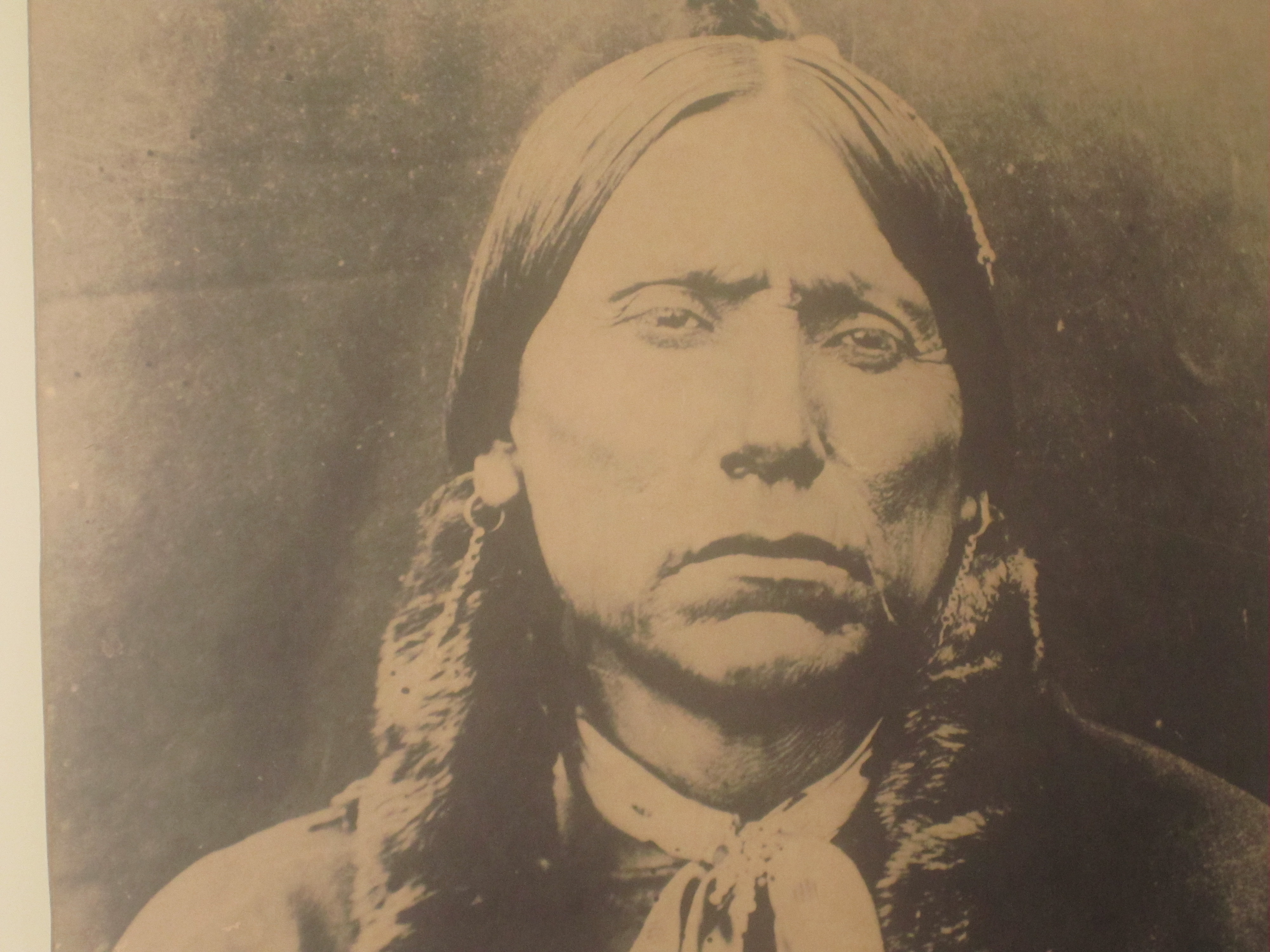
Quanah Parker photograph at Pioneer West Museum in Shamrock, Texas

Quanah Parker took two wives in 1872 according to Baldwin Parker, one of Quanah Parker's sons. His first wife was Ta-ho-yea (or Tohayea), the daughter of Mescalero Apache chief Old Wolf. He had wed her in Mescalero by visiting his Apache allies since the 1860s and had got her for five mules. After a year of marriage and a visit of Mescalero Apache in the Quohada camps, Ta-ho-yea asked to return home, citing as her reason her inability to learn the Comanche language. Quanah Parker sent her back to her people. Quanah Parker's other wife in 1872 was Wec-Keah or Weakeah, daughter of Penateka Comanche subchief Yellow Bear (sometimes Old Bear). Although first espoused to another warrior, she and Quanah Parker eloped, and took several other warriors with them. Yellow Bear pursued the band and eventually Quanah Parker made peace with him. The two bands united, forming the largest force of Comanche Indians.

Over the years, Quanah Parker married six more wives: Chony, Mah-Chetta-Wookey, Ah-Uh-Wuth-Takum, Coby, Tópee (Toe-Pay), and Tonarcy. A photograph, c. 1890, by William B. Ellis of Quanah Parker and two of his wives identified them as Topay and Chonie. Quanah Parker had eight wives and twenty-five children (some of whom were adopted).

After moving to the reservation, Quanah Parker got in touch with his white relatives from his mother's family. He stayed for a few weeks with them, where he studied English and Western culture, and learned white farming techniques.

== Founder of the Native American Church Movement ==
Quanah Parker is credited as one of the first important leaders of the Native American Church movement. Quanah Parker adopted the peyote religion after having been gored in southern Texas by a bull. Parker was visiting his uncle, John Parker, in Texas where he was attacked, giving him severe wounds. To fight an onset of blood burning fever, a Mexican curandera was summoned and she prepared a strong peyote tea from fresh peyote to heal him. Thereafter, Quanah Parker became involved with peyote, which contains hordenine, mescaline or phenylethylamine alkaloids, and tyramine which act as natural antibiotics when taken in a combined form.

Quanah Parker taught that the sacred peyote medicine was the sacrament given to the Indian peoples and was to be used with water when taking communion in a traditional Native American Church medicine ceremony. Quanah Parker was a proponent of the "half-moon" style of the peyote ceremony. The "cross" ceremony later evolved in Oklahoma because of Caddo influences introduced by John Wilson, a Caddo-Delaware religious leader who traveled extensively around the same time as Parker during the early days of the Native American Church movement.

Quanah Parker's most famous teaching regarding the spirituality of the Native American Church:

The White Man goes into his church house and talks about Jesus, but the Indian goes into his tipi and talks to Jesus.

The modern reservation era in Native American history began with the adoption of the Native American Church and Christianity by nearly every Native American tribe and culture within the United States and Canada as a result of Quanah Parker and Wilson's efforts. The peyote religion and the Native American Church were never the traditional religious practice of North American Indian cultures. This religion developed in the nineteenth century, inspired by events of the time being east and west of the Mississippi River, Quanah Parker's leadership, and influences from Native Americans of Mexico and other southern tribes. They had used peyote in spiritual practices since ancient times. He advocated only using mind-altering substances for ritual purposes.

== Performing ==
Quanah Parker acted in several silent films, including The Bank Robbery (1908).

== Death ==
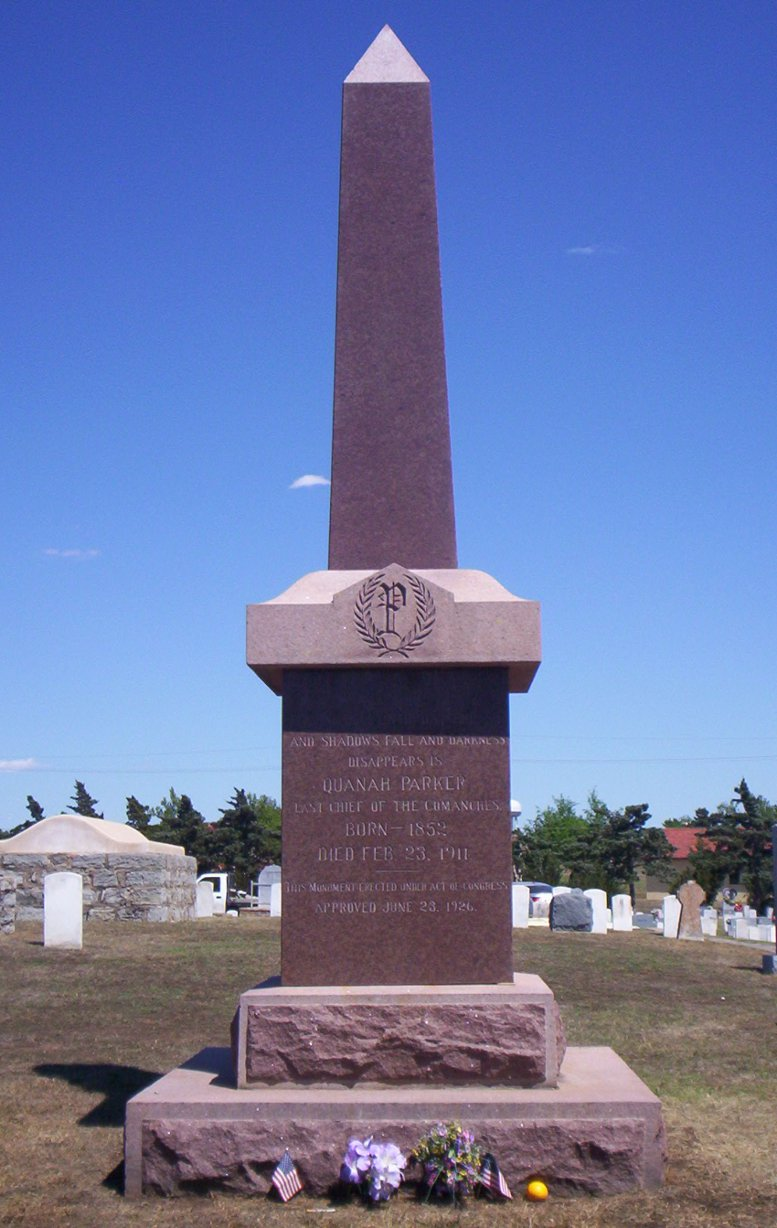
Quanah Parker gravesite

At the age of 66, Quanah Parker died on February 23, 1911, at Star House. In 1911, Quanah Parker's body was interred at Post Oak Mission Cemetery near Cache, Oklahoma. In 1957, his remains were moved to Fort Sill Post Cemetery at Fort Sill, Oklahoma, along with his mother Cynthia Ann Parker and sister Topsannah ("Prairie Flower"). The inscription on his tombstone reads:

Resting Here Until Day Breaks
And Shadows Fall and Darkness
Disappears is
Quanah Parker Last Chief of the Comanches
Born 1852
Died Feb. 23, 1911

— Post Oak Mission Cemetery Comanche County, Oklahoma 34.62310°N 98.75970°W

Biographer Bill Neeley wrote: "Not only did Quanah pass within the span of a single lifetime from a Stone Age warrior to a statesman in the age of the Industrial Revolution, but he never lost a battle to the white man and he also accepted the challenge and responsibility of leading the whole Comanche tribe on the difficult road toward their new existence."

== Criticism ==
Although praised by many in his tribe as a preserver of their culture, Quanah Parker also had Comanche critics. Critic Paul Chaat Smith called "Quanah Parker: sellout or patriot?" the "basic Comanche political question".

Quanah Parker did adopt some European-American ways, but he always wore his hair long and in braids. He also refused to follow U.S. marriage laws and had up to eight wives at one time.

== Descendants ==
The Quanah Parker Society, based in Cache, Oklahoma, holds an annual family reunion and powwow. Events usually include a pilgrimage to sacred sites in Quanah, Texas; tour of his "Star Home" in Cache; dinner; memorial service at Fort Sill Post Cemetery; gourd dance, pow-wow, and worship services. This event is open to the public.

Comanche Native American Studies professor Dustin Tahmahkera is a great-great grandson of Parker.

== Memorials and honors ==
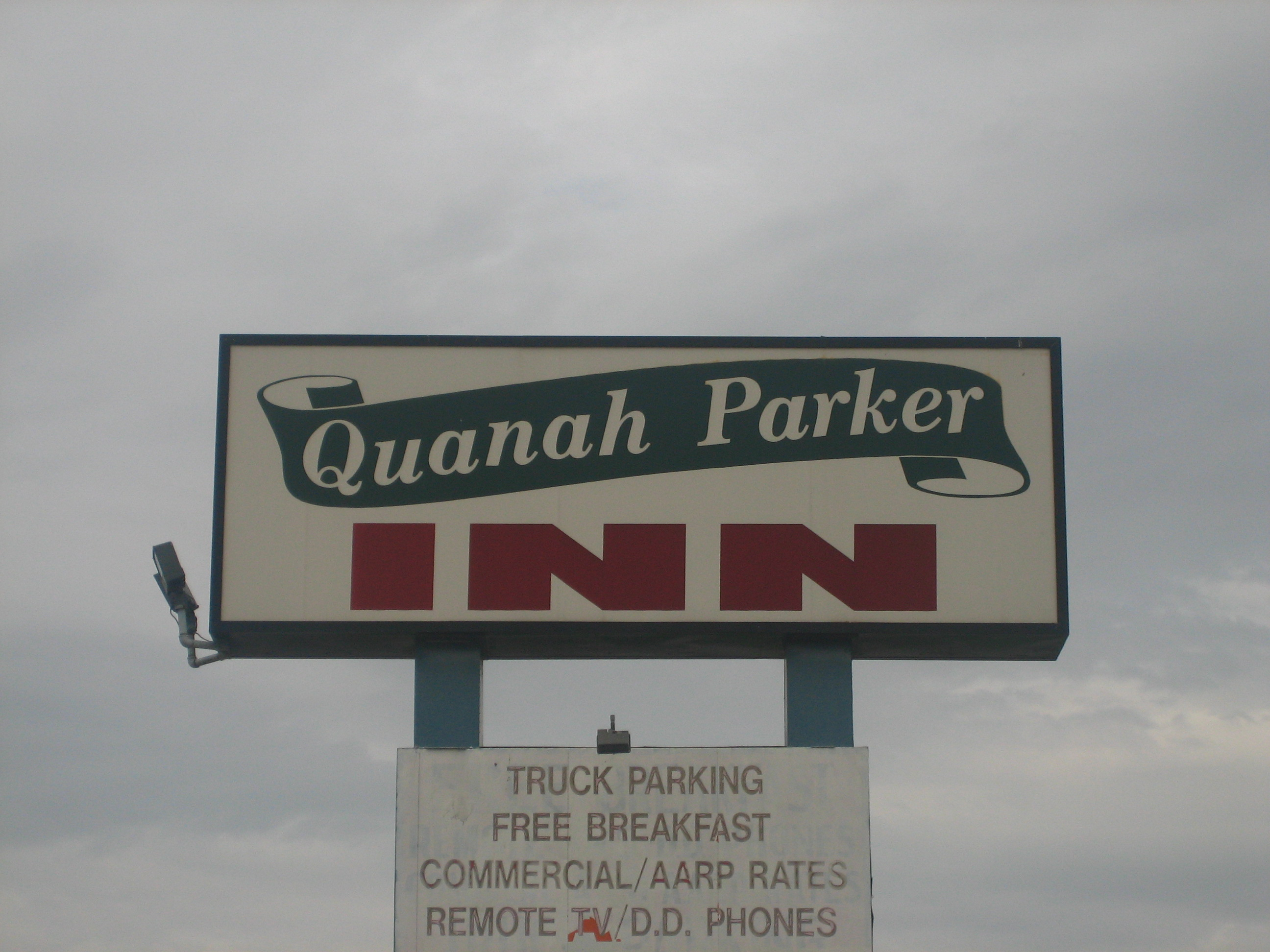
The Quanah Parker Inn is located on U.S. Highway 287 at the west end of Quanah, Texas.

- In 1970, the Star House was listed on the National Register of Historic Places.
- The Quanah Parker Trail, a public art project begun in 2010 by the Texas Plains Trail Region, commemorates sites of Comanche history in the Plains and Panhandle of Texas, the central region of Comancheria.
- Quanah, Texas, county seat of Hardeman County. The Quanah Parker Inn is located on U.S. Highway 287. At the founding of Quanah, Parker made this blessing:

May the Great Spirit smile on your little town, May the rain fall in season, and in the warmth of the sunshine after the rain, May the earth yield bountifully, May peace and contentment be with you and your children forever.

- Nocona, Texas, is named after Quanah Parker's father, Comanche chief Peta Nocona.
- 1962, Parker Hall, a residence hall at Oklahoma State University.
- Parker Hall, a residence hall at Southwestern Oklahoma State University.
- The Quanah Parker Trailway portion of Highway 62 in southern Oklahoma.
- Quanah Parker Lake and Quanah Creek, both in the Wichita Mountains, are named in his honor.
- Quanah Parker Trail, a small residential street on the northeast side of Norman, Oklahoma.
- In Fort Worth, along the banks of the Trinity River, is Quanah Parker Park.
- The Quanah, Acme and Pacific Railway, which originated in Texas in 1902 and was merged with the Burlington Northern Railroad in 1981.
- Quanah Parker Elementary School in Midland, Texas
- 2007, State of Texas historical marker erected in the name of Quanah Parker near the Fort Worth Stockyards Historic District recognizing his endeavors as a cattleman and Oklahoma rancher.
- In 2019, the asteroid (260366) Quanah = 2004 US3, discovered on October 28, 2004, by J. Dellinger at Needville, was named in his honor.
- In 1997, the Amon G. Carter foundation donated 88 acres in east Fort Worth, TX for park purposes. 68 of those areas were turned into what is now known as Quanah Parker Park located at 5401 Randol Mill Rd, Fort Worth, TX 76112.

== In popular culture ==
- In the 1956 film Comanche, directed by George Sherman, Quanah Parker is played by Kent Smith.
- Richard Angarola (1920–2008) was cast as Quanah Parker in the 1959 episode "Tribal Justice" of the syndicated television anthology series Death Valley Days, hosted by Stanley Andrews. In the story line, Parker, before he becomes Comanche chief, must clear his name for causing the death of a fellow tribesman.
- In the TV series, Have Gun, Will Travel, Season 3, Episode 26, "Fight at Adobe Wells", first broadcast in 1960, Quanah Parker is played by Brad Weston.
- In the 1961 film Two Rode Together, Quanah Parker is portrayed by Henry Brandon.
- In Texas! Outdoor Musical, an outdoor drama performed in the Palo Duro Canyon State Park since 1966, Quanah Parker is a character that was depicted by his descendant Benny Tahmahkera.
- Chapter XIV of Poul Anderson's novel The Boat of a Million Years (pub. 1989) portrays Parker in a fictional incident in 1872 concerning the imminent massacre of a settler family by Comanches. Parker is portrayed in a sympathetic light.
- The 2008 miniseries Comanche Moon featured Quanah Parker as a minor character, played by Eddie Spears.
- In the 2021 Paramount+ TV series 1883, Martin Sensmeier plays Sam, a skilled Comanche warrior loyal to Quanah Parker, who later takes Elsa as his wife.
- In the 2024 LP Le Loup et la Guitare from the French guitarist Pierre Schott, there's a special tribute to Quanah Parker.
- Book, The Sun Dial Press, Inc. Garden City, New Jersey; copyright 1992 by Doubleday, Page, and Company; written by Forrestine Cooper Hooker: Star The Story of an Indian Pony
