= John Richard Parker =

American kidnapped by Comanche Indians (1830-1915)

John Richard Parker (1830–1915) was an American man who was kidnapped from his natural family at the age of five by a Native American raiding party, and the brother of Cynthia Ann Parker and the uncle of Comanche chief Quanah Parker.

He returned to the Native American people of his own free will after being ransomed back from the Comanche. He was a member of the large Parker frontier family that settled in central Texas in the 1830s. He was captured in 1836 by Comanches during the raid of Fort Parker near present-day Groesbeck, Texas.

== Birth and early years ==
John Parker was born in 1830 in Crawford County, Illinois, the second oldest child of Silas Mercer Parker (1804–1836) and Lucinda Duty. His younger siblings were Silas Mercer Jr., and Orlena. His older sister was Cynthia Ann Parker. This family and allied families, led by Silas's father John and brother Daniel, moved from Illinois to Texas in 1833. A large group under the family patriarch, Elder John Parker, settled near the headwaters of the Navasota River in present-day Limestone County. In 1834 they completed Fort Parker for their protection on the frontier.

On May 19, 1836, a large force of Comanche and allied warriors attacked the fort, and in what became known as the Fort Parker Massacre killed five men and captured two women and three children: Parker, his elder sister Cynthia Ann, Rachel Plummer and her son James Pratt Plummer as well as Elizabeth Duty Kellogg.

=== Captivity ===
The Comanche's population had increased in large part by adopting captured women and children into the tribe, the former as child-bearing slaves and the latter as tribal members. The Comanche made little distinction among tribal members born into the tribe, and those adopted in. Children under puberty were tested for intelligence, strength and courage, and if they seemed acceptable in all, they were adopted into the tribe and taught to be warriors. Grown men captured alive were generally killed.

Elizabeth Duty Kellogg was quickly ransomed from the relatively benign Delaware Indians by Sam Houston. Rachel Plummer endured nearly two years of captivity among the Comanche, and never saw her oldest child, James Pratt Plummer, again. Her second child, born six months after her kidnapping, was murdered by the Comanche, who claimed that the child interfered with her work.

Parker was raised by the Comanche, as were his sister and younger cousin, James Pratt Plummer. The two boys were ransomed back in 1842, when Parker was 12 and Plummer was 8. Plummer was returned to his grandfather and was able to readapt to white society, but Parker was unable to readapt and ran away from his family to return to the Comanches.

== In Mexico ==
As did most young Comanche, Parker participated in many raids into Mexico during the September full moon, the "Comanche Moon," when the dreaded Comanche raids devastated parts of northern Mexico. On one of the raids, he contracted smallpox. The Comanche were returning from the raid with captives, horses, and other plunder, but they stopped briefly when Parker became too ill to ride, somewhere just north of the Rio Grande in West Texas. The Comanche were terrified that they, too, would catch this dreaded killer, which had killed over half the tribe during the epidemic years, and they left Parker to ride out the illness, leaving a girl they had captured on the raid to take care of him. Rather than leave to try to return to her family, the girl nursed Parker back to health. He then returned to Mexico with the girl and restored her to her home and family. He later married her.

== Later life ==
Parker returned to the United States during the Civil War and served with Confederate troops in Texas. After the war, he returned to Mexico, where he died in 1915 on his ranch. He appeared to have been the only one of the Parker children who lived an apparently good life.
