= Post Oak, Oklahoma =

Unincorporated community in Oklahoma, US

Post Oak
- Unincorporated community
- Location within the state of Oklahoma Post Oak (the United States)
- Coordinates: 34°04′16″N 97°25′18″W
- Country: United States
- State: Oklahoma
- County: Carter
- Established: 1896
- Elevation: 945 ft (288 m)
- Time zone: UTC-6 (Central (CST))
  - Summer (DST): UTC-5 (CDT)
- ZIP codes: 73463
- GNIS feature ID: 1100757

Post Oak is an unincorporated community in Carter County, Oklahoma, United States.

A Comanche Indian mission, Post Oak Mission, was established in 1896 in Post Oak by the Mennonite Brethren Churches of North America. In 1957, in order to make room for a missile range, the mission and its cemetery were relocated to Indiahoma. Today the mission is known as the Post Oak Mennonite Brethren Church.
