= Comanche Wars =

Conflicts over Comanche lands, 1706 to 1870s

- Part of the Texas–Indian wars
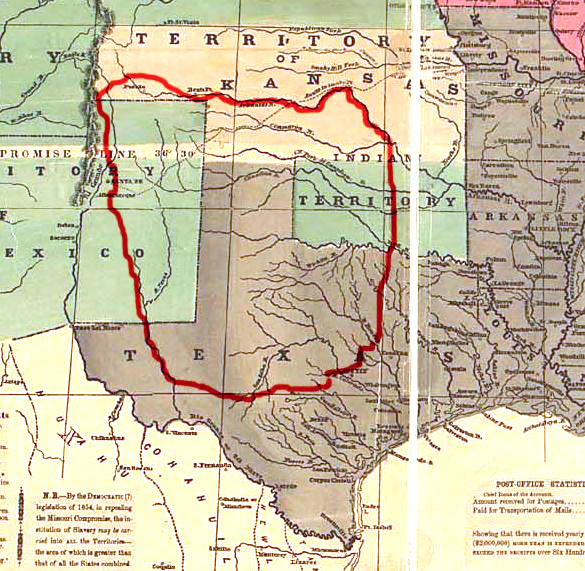
- A map showing the Comanche lands (Comancheria) during the 1800s
Date	1706 – 1875
Location	South-central United States (Texas, Oklahoma, New Mexico, Kansas, Colorado) and northern Mexico
Result	Comanche victory over Spain and Mexico; Final Texan and United States victory

Belligerents
Spain (until 1821); Mexico; Republic of Texas (from 1836 to 1846); United States; Confederate States (from 1861–1865)	Comanche
- Texas Comanche wars 1836 – 1875

The Comanche Wars were a series of armed conflicts fought between Comanche peoples and Spanish, Mexican, and American militaries and civilians in the United States and Mexico from as early as 1706 until at least the mid-1870s. The Comanche were the Native American inhabitants of a large area known as Comancheria, which stretched across much of the southern Great Plains from Colorado and Kansas in the north through Oklahoma, Texas, and eastern New Mexico and into the Mexican state of Chihuahua in the south. For more than 150 years, and bolstered by great horsemanship, the Comanche were the dominant native tribe in the region, known as “the Lords of the Southern Plains”, though they also shared parts of Comancheria with the Wichita, Kiowa, and Kiowa Apache and, after 1840, the southern Cheyenne and Arapaho.

The value of the Comanche traditional homeland was recognized by European-American colonists seeking to settle the American frontier and quickly brought the two sides into conflict. The Comanche Wars began in 1706 with raids by Comanche warriors on the Spanish colonies of New Spain and continued until the last bands of Comanche surrendered to the United States Army in 1875, although a few Comanche continued to fight in later conflicts such as the Buffalo Hunters' War in 1876 and 1877. The Comanche were noted as fierce combatants who practiced an emphatic resistance to European-American influence and encroachment upon their lands.

Comanche power peaked in the 1840s when they conducted large-scale raids hundreds of miles into Mexico proper, while also warring against the Anglo-Americans and Tejanos who had settled in independent Texas. Their power declined as epidemics of cholera and smallpox caused thousands of Comanche deaths and as continuous pressure from the expanding population of the United States forced them to cede most of their tribal lands.

== Influential people ==
=== Iron Jacket ===
Iron Jacket was a Comanche chief and medicine man. The name “Iron Jacket” came from his tendency to wear a coat of mail into battle. Iron Jacket took part in the Antelope Hills Expedition of 1858, where he was ultimately killed at the Battle of Little Robe Creek. His son, Peta Nocona, became a chief himself.

=== Peta Nocona ===
Peta Nocona was the father of the last Comanche Chief Quanah Parker, as well as a Comanche Chief who played a crucial part in the Indian Wars. Peta Nocona led the full attack on Fort Parker where Cynthia Ann Parker was taken captive and later became his wife. Peta Nocona's place and date of death is still in dispute.

=== Quanah Parker ===
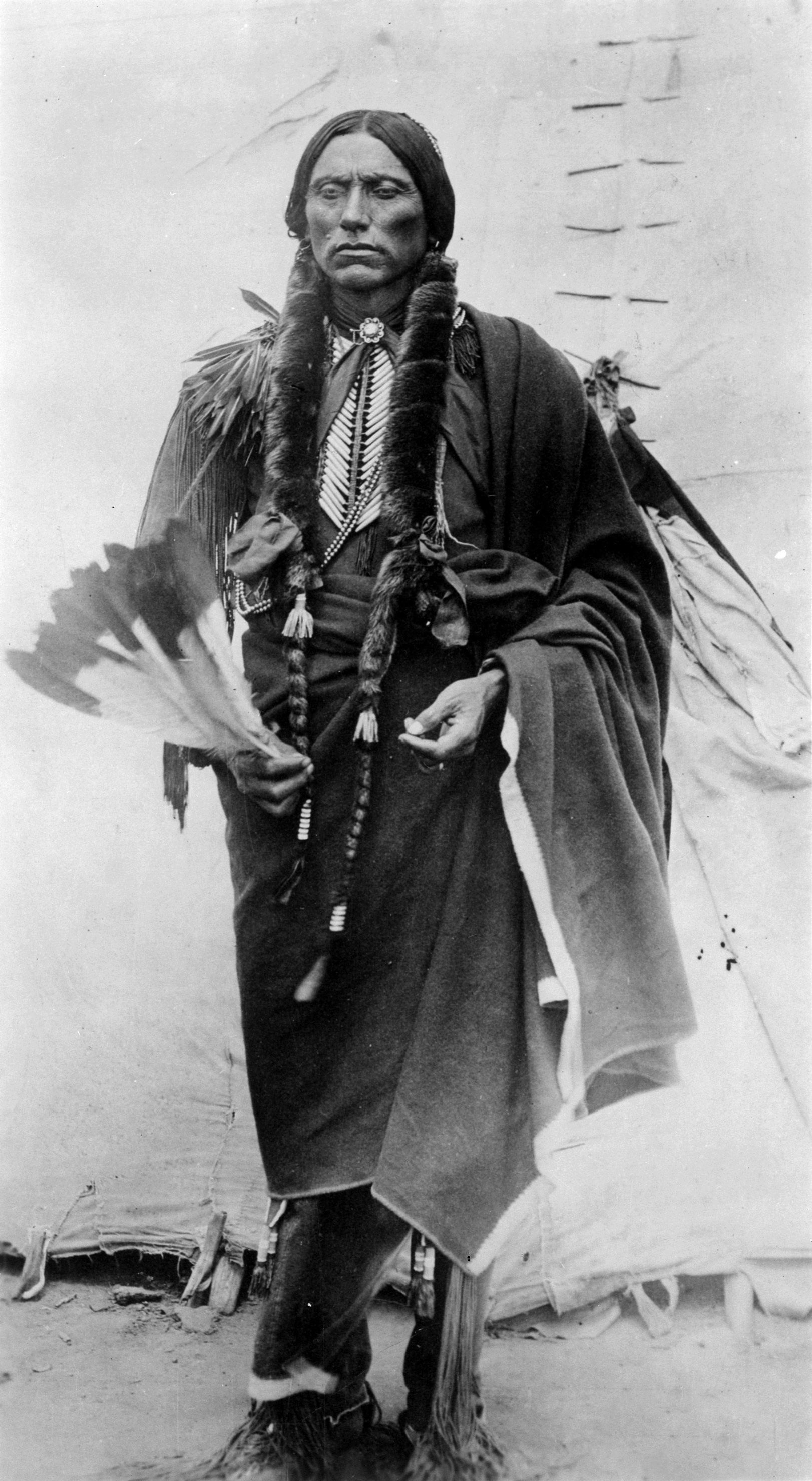
Chief Quanah Parker, son of Cynthia Parker and last chief of the Comanche

Quanah Parker was the last Comanche Chief and part of the Quahadi sect of the Comanche, who were highly respected by the other tribes. Quanah was never an official chief since the United States government appointed him to the position. Before he was a Comanche chief, Quanah Parker witnessed the peace negotiations of 1867 but refused to sign the accords.

=== Buffalo Hump ===
Buffalo Hump was a Comanche War Chief who led the Great Raid of 1840 after Texan officials killed Comanche delegates during the events that unfolded during the Council House Fight.

=== Mirabeau B. Lamar ===
Mirabeau Lamar was the second President of the Republic of Texas from 1838 to 1841, preceded by Sam Houston. Mirabeau Lamar had a harsher policy towards Native Americans in Texas and signed two bills which escalated tensions in the region. The first bill was signed on December 21, 1838, which formed an 840-man regiment to protect the Northern and Western Frontiers of Texas. An additional bill was passed on December 29, 1838, which added an additional 8 companies of mounted volunteers to serve 6 month deployments.

=== Santa Anna (Comanche war chief) ===
Santa Anna was a Comanche war chief who advocated for armed resistance against the Texas settlers, and became influential after the Council House Fight of 1840 in San Antonio. Santa Anna joined forces with Buffalo Hump and most likely took part in the Battle of Plum Creek and the Great Raid of 1840. Santa Anna was the first of his tribe to travel to Washington, D.C., and agreed to sign a treaty in May 1846, despite the continued hostilities. Santa Anna died from a cholera outbreak in 1849.

== Battles and campaigns in the United States ==
=== Fort Parker massacre (May 1836) ===
The Fort Parker massacre was a raid conducted by a coalition of tribes including the Comanches, Kiowas, Caddos and Wichitas. They attacked the fort killing five of the inhabitants and capturing Cynthia Ann Parker a nine-year old who later married the Comanche chief Peta Nocona, John Richard Parker the brother of Cynthia Ann Parker, Rachel Plummer a seventeen-year-old wife along with her son James Pratt Plummer, and lastly Elizabeth Duty Kellog who was later reunited with her sister Martha in 1836.

=== Council House Fight (March 1840) ===
The Council House Fight was a Peace delegation turned conflict between the Comanche delegates and the Texas officials on March 19, 1840. The conflict started over negotiations regarding Texan and Mexican captives that the Comanches were holding in order to gain back sections of Comancheria that Texas had claimed. The Council house fight ended with twelve of the Comanche Leaders killed inside the Council house as well as 23 others shot in San Antonio.

=== Battle of Plum Creek (August 1840) ===
The Battle of Plum Creek was a conflict in Lockhart, Texas that took place on August 12, 1840. It was an attack led by Chief Buffalo Hump who led a large force of 1,000 Comanche warriors against 200 Texas Rangers in response to the Council House Fight. The Battle Began as a raid where the Comanche party stole livestock and firearms which gradually turned into a gun fight. The results of the battle are still being debated since the Rangers reported 80 Comanches were killed but only 12 bodies were found The Comanches claimed to have killed 11 Texas Rangers.

=== Battle of Walker's Creek (June 8, 1844) ===
Another celebrated battle between the Texas Rangers and the Comanche occurred in Kendall County, Texas. Led by John Coffee Hays, a small group of Texas Rangers defeated a larger party of Comanche through extensive use of repeating firearms, most notably, the Colt Paterson. The victory of the Texas Rangers, and the superiority of revolvers over traditional bows and arrows, paved the way for the former's popularity and the invention of the Colt Walker.

=== Antelope Hills expedition (January–May 1858) ===
The Antelope Hills expedition was a campaign led by the federal 2nd Cavalry against the Comanche and Kiowa tribes in Comancheria. It started in January 1858 and ended in May of the same year. The cause for the expedition was due to Comanche raids into Texan territories. Peta Nocona and Iron Jacket led Comanche troops against the combined 220 forces of the 2nd cavalry, Tonkawa, Nadaco and Shawnee. Their expedition's purpose was to move the 2nd Cavalry from Oklahoma to Texas in order to better handle the raiding Comanches. For this reason the United States gained the aid of the Comanches' enemy tribes Tonkawa, Nadaco and Shawnee. The resulting battle concluded with 50 killed on the United States side and 76 killed and 16 captured on the Comanche side. The Antelope Hills Expedition further expanded into the Battle of Little Robe Creek.

==== Battle of Little Robe Creek ====
The 1858 Battle of Little Robe Creek (Also known as the Battle of Antelope Hills) was a battle fought between the Comanches' allies of the Kiowa and the Apache against the Texas Rangers with their allies the Tonkawa, Caddo, Anadarko, Waco, Shawnee, Delaware, and Tahaucano. The Battle was the first in which the Texas Rangers successfully advanced into Comancheria. The United States rallied a force of 100 Texas Rangers and 113 allies where the Comanches rallied a force between the range of 200-600. The "battle" itself was actually three decisive engagements between the Comanches and the Texas Rangers; the first began in the morning of May 12 when the Rangers, led by General Ford launched a surprise attack on a Comanche camp. The Comanches were caught completely off guard and a massacre occurred. The second battle began when the Texas Rangers attempted to do the same to another nearby Comanche encampment. As they encroached on the camp, the Rangers were spotted by Comanche scouts. Though able to mount a concerted defense this time, the Comanche still suffered heavy casualties. It was not until the third and final battle of Little Robe creek that Comanche warriors were able to take an offensive stance against the Texas Rangers who then withdrew back into Texas proper. However, the campaign was costly for the Comanche forces: with 76 killed and over 60 warriors captured by the Texas Rangers, who by comparison lost only two killed and five wounded.

=== Battle of Pease River (December 1860) ===
The Battle of Pease River took place on December 18, 1860, in Foard County, Texas. This battle has become highly debated due to unreliable sources and exaggerated facts surrounding the event, but the event started in November 1860, most likely when a band of Comanche warriors, "struck farms, ranches, and outlying settlements in Parker, Young, Jack, and Palo Pinto counties west of Fort Worth." In these Comanche raids property was stolen and at least six people were killed. The citizens responded by pursuing the Comanches to a village on the Pease River, but because there were too many Comanches, the citizens had to wait for a larger force to arrive. Three units arrived, led by Lawrence Sullivan "Sul" Ross, Captain J.J. Cureton, and First Sergeant John W. Spangler. On December 19, 1860, Sul Ross led the attack on the Comanche village and according to Ross's report, "killed twelve of the Comanches and captured three: a woman who turned out to be Cynthia Ann Parker, her daughter Topsannah (Prairie Flower), and a young boy whom Ross brought to Waco and named Pease Ross...The whole incident lasted twenty minutes-thirty at the most."

=== First Battle of Adobe Walls (November 1864) ===
The First Battle of Adobe Walls was a battle fought against the United States Army and the Comanche Allies of Kiowa, and the Plains Apaches. The battle began when Kit Carson attacked a Kiowa town In response the Kiowa and Comanches launched a counterattack of over 1,000 men. The battle was long and drawn out almost to the point of the United States army running out of ammunition.

=== Red River War (June- September 1874) ===
In 1874 what came to be known as the Red River War (or Buffalo War) began. With the total population of the Comanche tribe reduced to only around 3,000 in total, divisions began to appear within the tribe. About two-thirds of the remaining Comanche now resided on the reservation, often labeled the “tamed Comanche” or “broken Comanche”. About 1,000 Comanche however continuing to roam the plains. Most of these Comanche would be considered civilians with only about 300 being actual warriors. The unsettled Comanche joined forces with warriors from likeminded factions of Kiowa, Kiowa Apache, and Southern Cheyenne and gathered together in the North Texas panhandle near the four major forks of Red River. The federal government responded by sending forty-six companies of soldiers, the largest force ever deployed against Native Americans by the U.S., under the command of General Mackenzie. The majority of the Red River War was conducted in guerrilla warfare and search-and-destroy tactics. The conflict ended with the Battle of Palo Duro Canyon, when General Mackenzie was able to conduct a surprise attack on the Comanche settlement. This led to the destruction of most of the Comanche’s resources and the seizure of 1,424 horses.

== See also ==
- Buffalo Hump
- Battle of Blanco Canyon
- Battle of Plum Creek
- Comanche
- Comanche campaign
- Comanche–Mexico Wars
- Council House Fight
- Medicine Lodge Treaty
- Red River War
- Texas-Indian Wars
