= Antelope Hills expedition =

1858 military campaign of the Texas Rangers against the Comanche and Kiowa peoples

- Part of the American Indian Wars, Texas–Indian Wars, Apache Wars
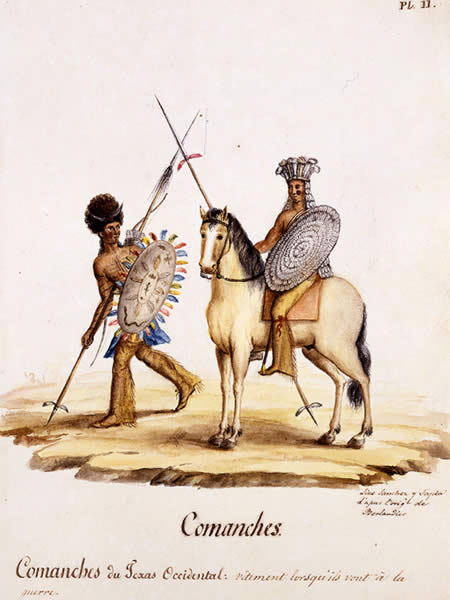
- Comanches of West Texas in war regalia. Painting by Lino Sánchez y Tapia, circa 1830s
Date	January 21, 1858 – May 12, 1858
Location	Comancheria, Texas, Oklahoma 35°54′15″N 99°53′04″W
Result	United States victory

Belligerents
United States; Tonkawa; Anadarko; Shawnee	Comanche; Kiowa; Apache

Commanders and leaders
(United States) John Salmon Ford; Placido	Iron Jacket †; Peta Nocona

Strength
~220	200–600

Casualties and losses
~50 killed or wounded	76 killed 16 captured
- Location within Oklahoma

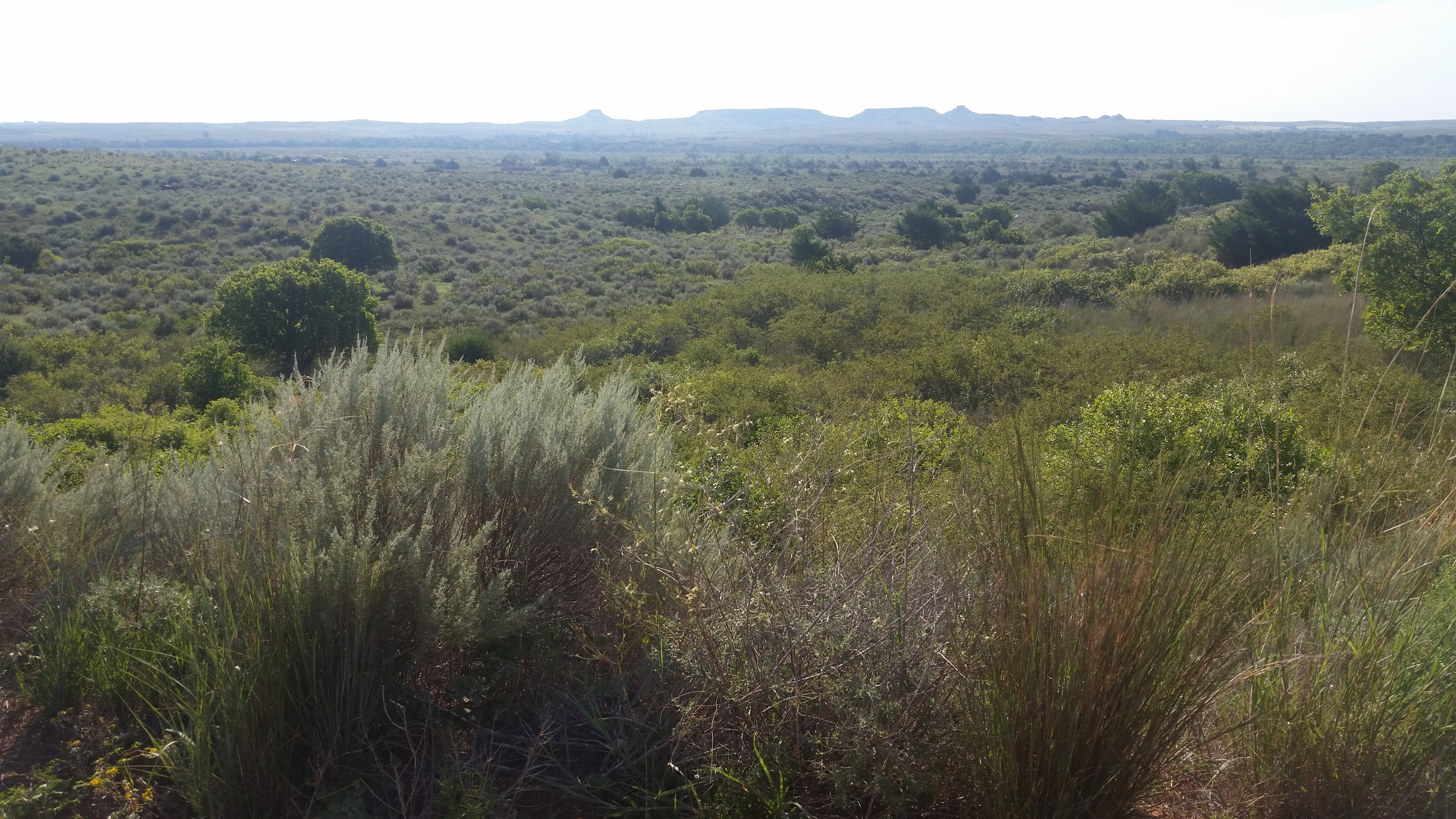
View of the Antelope Hills battlefield, with the Antelope Hills in the background and the Canadian River the midground: The confluence with Little Robe Creek is downstream to the left.

The Antelope Hills expedition was a campaign from January to May 1858 by the Texas Rangers and members of other allied Native American tribes against Comanche and Kiowa villages in the Comancheria. It began in western Texas and ended in a series of fights with the Comanche tribe on May 12, 1858, at a place called Antelope Hills by Little Robe Creek, a tributary of the Canadian River in what is now Oklahoma. The hills are also called the "South Canadians", as they surround the Canadian River. The fighting on May 12, 1858, is often called the Battle of Little Robe Creek.

== Background ==
=== Reasons for the expedition ===
The years 1856–58 on the Texas frontier were particularly vicious and bloody as settlers continued to encroach into the Comancheria. They plowed under valuable hunting grounds, and the Comanche lost grazing land for their herds of horses. In addition, the United States had done a great deal to block the Comanches' traditional raids into Mexico. Finally, the Comanches struck back with a series of ferocious and bloody raids against the settlers.

The Army proved wholly unable to stem the violence. Not only were units being transferred, but also federal law and numerous treaties barred the Army from attacking Indians in the Indian Territories. Although many Indians, such as the Cherokee, were trying to farm and live as settlers, the Comanche and Kiowa continued to live in that part of the Indian Territories that was traditionally the Comancheria, while raiding into Texas.

As the American Civil War drew closer, federal forces were moved about even more, and the 2nd Cavalry was transferred from Texas to Utah (eventually, the U.S. Army disbanded the 2nd Cavalry, as it fell apart when the war began in 1860). The loss of federal troops led Texas Governor Hardin R. Runnels in 1858 to re-establish disbanded battalions of Texas Rangers. Thus, on January 27, 1858, Runnels appointed John Salmon "Rip" Ford, a veteran Ranger of the Mexican–American War and frontier Indian fighter, as captain and commander of the Ranger, militia and allied Indian forces, and ordered him to carry the battle to the Comanches in the heart of the Comancheria.

Ford, whose habit of signing casualty reports with the initials "RIP" for "Rest in Peace", was known as a ferocious and no-nonsense Indian fighter. Commonly missing from the history books was his proclivity for ordering the wholesale slaughter of any Indian, man or woman, he could find. Runnels issued explicit orders to Ford: "I impress upon you the necessity of action and energy. Follow any trail and all trails of hostile or suspected hostile Indians you may discover and if possible, overtake and chastise them if unfriendly." Ford then raised a force of about 100 Texas Rangers and state militia. Realizing that even with repeating rifles, Sharps rifles and Colt revolvers, he needed additional men, so he set out to recruit ones he did not have to pay, as he did his Rangers and militia.

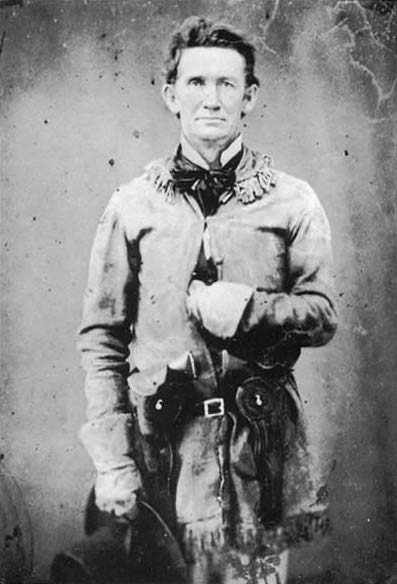
Capt. John "Rip" Ford.

=== Recruiting Indian allies ===
Among the traditional enemies of the Comanche were the Tonkawa Indians, then living on a reservation on the Brazos River in Texas.

On March 19, 1858, Ford went to the Brazos Reservation, near what today is the city of Fort Worth, Texas, to recruit the Tonkawa to join him. Indian agent Captain L.S. Ross, father of future governor of Texas Lawrence Sullivan Ross, called Chief Placido of the Tonkawa to a war council, where Ross stirred Placido's anger against their mutual enemy. He succeeded in recruiting 120 or so Native Americans in this campaign, 111 of whom were Tonkawa under Chief Placido, hailed as the "faithful and implicitly trusted friend of the whites", the others being Anadarko and Shawnee. They joined with roughly an equal number of Texas Rangers to move against the Comanches.

Ford's orders from Runnels were to follow any and all trails of hostile and suspected hostile Indians, inflict the most severe punishment (kill them and their families, destroy their homes and food supplies) and allow no interference from "any source". ("Any source" meant the United States, whose Army and Indian agents might try to enforce federal treaties and federal law against trespassing on the Indian territories in Oklahoma).

== Expedition ==
=== Advancing from Texas to Oklahoma ===
Scouts were sent to locate Comanche camps north of the Red River in the Comancheria. In April 1858, Ford established Camp Runnels near what was once the town of Belknap. Ford and Placido were determined to follow the Comanche and Kiowa up to their strongholds amid the hills of the Canadian River and into the Wichita Mountains, and if possible kill their warriors, decimate their food supply, strike at their homes and families, and generally destroy their ability to make war.

Once he had advanced far into the Texas Comancheria, Ford intended to go further, law or not. On April 15, his Rangers and the Indians from the Brazos Indian Reservation crossed the Red River and advanced into the portion of the Comancheria in the Indian Territories in Oklahoma. Ford knew full well he was violating federal laws and numerous treaties by moving into the Indian territories but stated later that his job was to "find and fight Indians, not to learn geography."

=== Battle at Little Robe Creek ===
At dawn on May 12, Ford attacked a small Comanche village in the Canadian River Valley, flanked by the Antelope Hills. Later that day, they attacked a second village, which provided much stiffer resistance until its chief, Iron Jacket, was killed. His son Peta Nocona arrived with reinforcements, which led to a third distinct clash between the Texas forces and the Comanche. At day's end, the Rangers and their allies retreated to Texas; the Comanches, though in retreat, were gathering reinforcements as more of their tribe arrived, together with Kiowa and Kiowa Apache allies. Having suffered only four Ranger casualties, plus over a dozen Tonkawas, the force killed a reported 76 Comanche and took 16 prisoners and 300 horses. It had burned Iron Jacket's village and the original small village that they had attacked. Mention in history is limited, and none is in Ford's official reports on the battle, that the Tonkawa ate their dead Comanche rivals on the night of May 12 in what is referred to as a "dreadful feast".

== Aftermath ==
Ford returned to Texas and requested that the governor immediately empower him to raise additional levies of Rangers and return north at once to continue the campaign in the heart of the Comancheria. Runnels had exhausted the entire budget for defense for the year, though, and disbanded the Rangers.

Although Ford was unable to continue this campaign, it changed the face of Indian fighting on the Plains and marked the beginning of the end for the Comanche and Kiowa. Only the Civil War delayed the inevitable. For the first time, Texan or American forces had penetrated to the heart of the Comancheria, attacked Comanche villages with impunity and successfully made it home. The U.S. Army adopted many of Ford's tactics, including his attacking women and children as well as warriors, and destroying their food supply, the buffalo, in their campaigns against the Plains tribes after the Civil War.
