= Iron Jacket =

Quahadi Comanche leader

- Puhihwikwasu'u

Quahadi Comanche leader
- In office 1820–1850

Personal details
- Born: c. 1790 Comancheria
- Died: May 12, 1858 Little Robe Creek, Indian Territory (now Ellis County, Oklahoma)
- Cause of death: Gunshot wound
- Children: Peta Nocona
- Known for: Comanche leader who wore a Spanish coat of mail into battle; Medicine man whom the Comanches considered as having the power to blow bullets aside with his breath; 1820–1850 led the Quahadi Comanche tribe during the Texas–Indian wars; Grandfather of the last Comanche chief, Quanah Parker

Iron Jacket (Comanche: Puhihwikwasu'u, lit. 'metal shirt'; born c. 1790 – died 1858) was a Native American War Chief and Chief of the Quahadi band of Comanche Native Americans.

Iron Jacket was a Comanche chieftain and medicine man whom the Comanche believed had the power to blow bullets aside with his breath. His name probably resulted from his habit of wearing a Spanish coat of scale mail into battle, which protected him from most light weapons fire.

On May 12, 1858, the jacket (likely inherited from his ancestors) failed to protect him, and he was killed on the bank of the Little Robe Creek tributary of the South Canadian River in the Battle of Little Robe Creek where his band of Quahadi Comanches fought a combined force of Texas Rangers and Brazos Reservation Indians led by John S. Ford, Shapley Prince Ross (the father of Lawrence Sullivan Ross), and Plácido, a Tonkawa chief.

== Early life ==
Not much is known about Iron Jacket's early life. He was born in the late 1780s or early 1790s, likely being son or nephew to Kwahadi chief Waakakwasi ("Trotter", called by Mexicans "Cota-de-Maya" or "Cota-de-Malla", i.e. "Iron Shirt" or "Iron Jacket"). He became a chief among the Kwahadi, or Antelope-eaters, Band of the Comanche. He appears to have been both a hereditary chief and a War Chief. Little else is known about Iron Jacket, except that he led dozens of terrifying raids on settlers from the 1820s to the 1850s in Texas and Mexico. In 1835, consequently to the Camp Holmes Council, he likely signed (his name was reported as Pohowetowshah, "Brass Man") the treaty with General M. Arbuckle and the former U.S. Senator Montfort Stokes, along with Comanche chiefs such Tawaquenah ("Sun Eagle") of the Kotsoteka and Amorous Man of the Penateka. In 1840 he likely was one of the leaders dealing, on the Comanche and Kiowa side, with the Cheyenne and Arapaho in the negotiations for the peace and alliance agreement promoted by the Yamparika chief Ten Bears.

It is believed today that he was a hereditary chief of the Comanche, and for decades the US and Mexican victims of his raids considered him a supernatural being because of his seeming invulnerability to any harm. Members of the Rangers, posses and the military on various occasions insisted that they shot the chief dead center without harming him.

Evidently, this was because of the coat of old Spanish mail the chief wore, which appears to have protected him from light weapons fire. In any event, he was a feared and dangerous figure along the Texas and Mexican border, and in the Comancheria in the decades leading up to the American Civil War.

== Antelope Hills Expedition ==
The years leading up to the Civil War were particularly bloody on the Texas Frontier, as Iron Jacket, his son Peta Nocona, and other Comanche and Kiowa Chiefs clashed with encroaching white settlers in the Comancheria. In response to these raids, on January 27, 1858, Governor Runnels appointed John Salmon "Rip" Ford, a veteran Ranger of the Mexican–American War and frontier Indian fighter, as captain and commander of the Texas Ranger, Militia, and Allied Indian Forces, and ordered him to carry the battle to the Comanches in the heart of their homeland on the Comancheria.

Ford, who earned his name due to his habit of signing casualty reports with the initials "RIP" for "Rest In Peace", was known as a ferocious and no-nonsense Indian fighter. Commonly missing from the history books was his proclivity for ordering the wholesale slaughter of any Indian, man or woman, he could find. Ford's reason for this was simple: Comanche raids were brutal in their treatment of settlers. Thus, Ford was determined to meet brutality with brutality.

Governor Hardin Richard Runnels issued very explicit orders to Ford, "I impress upon you the necessity of action and energy. Follow any trail and all trails of hostile or suspected hostile Indians you may discover and if possible, overtake and chastise them if unfriendly".

On March 19, 1858, Ford went to the Brazos Reservation, near what today is the city of Fort Worth, Texas, and recruited the Tonkawa into his forces. Tonkawa Indians, the latter commanded by their "celebrated" chief Plácido, hailed as the "faithful and implicitly trusted friend of the whites" (with limited mention of their cannibalism), undertook a campaign with approximately an equal number of Texas Rangers against the Comanches. Ford and Plácido were determined to follow the Comanche and Kiowa up to their strongholds amid the hills of the Canadian River, and into the Wichita Mountains, and if possible, "kill their warriors, decimate their food supply, strike at their homes and families and generally destroy their ability to make war".

In April 1858, Ford established Camp Runnells near what used to be the town of Belknap. Ford was still operating under Governor Runnell's explicit orders to "follow any and all trails of hostile and suspected hostile Indians, inflict the most severe and summary punishment", and to "allow no interference from any source". 'Source' was interpreted to mean the United States, whose Army and Indian Agents might try to enforce federal treaties and federal statutory law against trespassing on the Indian territories in Oklahoma. On April 15, Ford's Rangers, accompanied by Tonkawa warriors, and Anadarko and Shawnee scouts from the Brazos Indian Reservation in Texas, crossed the Red River into Indian Territory. The force then advanced into the portion of the Comancheria in the Indian Territories in Oklahoma. Ford led his men across the Red River, into the Indian Territory, violating federal laws and numerous treaties, but stating later that his job was to "find and fight Indians, not to learn geography".

== Battle of Little Robe Creek and death of Iron Jacket ==
At sunrise on May 12, 1858, Ford and his joint force of Rangers and Tonkawa began an all-day battle with a dawn attack on a sleeping Comanche village. The so-called Battle of Little Robe Creek was actually three distinct separate incidents which happened over the course of a single day. The first was the attack on the sleeping village. The second was a follow-up attack on the village of Iron Jacket, somewhat further up the Canadian River. Iron Jacket was killed in this exchange, and the remainder of his village was saved by the timely intervention of Peta Nocona with a third force of Comanche who arrived to engage Ford while all the villages along the Canadian made a swift withdrawal.

Iron Jacket's death came when he repeatedly rode down the line of firing Rangers and Tonkawa, taunting them. Many historians believe the mail that protected him from light weapons fire simply was not able to protect him from the buffalo gun used by Tonkawa Jim Pockmark which killed him or, as Ford records, "six rifle shots rang on the air". In any event, the death of their legendary chief discouraged his warriors, and only the timely intervention of his son, Peta Nocona, and his warriors saved Iron Jacket's village. As it was, his body could not be recovered, and it was scalped and partially eaten by the cannibalistic Tonkawas.

== Personal life ==
Iron Jacket's son was the famous Comanche War Chief Peta Nocona and his grandson was Quanah Parker, the last Comanche Chief.

== Legacy ==
In James DeShields' 1886 book, Cynthia Ann Parker, he notes "The trophies of Pohebits Quasho, including his lance, bow, shield, head-dress and the celebrated coat of scale mail, was deposited by Col. Ford in the State archives at Austin". This claim is repeated verbatim in John Wesley Wilbarger's 1889 book, Indian Depredations in Texas.

However, T. R. Fehrenbach wrote in his 1974 book, Comanches, The Destruction of a People; "the Rangers broke up his scale mail and kept the shingles for souvenirs. His other accoutrements, such as his lance and shield, were sent to the Governor in Austin for display."

=== In popular culture ===
The 1980 film The Mountain Men featured a fictionalized version of Iron Jacket named "Chief Iron Belly", portrayed by Victor Jory.

== Sources ==
Books

- DeShields, James T. (1886). Cynthia Ann Parker. St. Louis, Missouri: Printing and Book Manufacturing Co. LCCN 12011021.
- Wilbarger, John Wesley (1889). Indian Depredations in Texas. Austin, Texas: Hutchins Printing Press – via Google Books. ISBN 0890155070
- Richardson, Rupert Norval (1933). The Comanche Barrier to South Plains Settlement: A Century and a Half of Savage Resistance to the Advancing White Frontier. Glendale, California: Arthur H. Clarke Co. OCLC 2472637.
- Wallace, Ernest; Hoebel, E. Adamson (1952). The Comanche: Lords of the Southern Plains. Norman, Oklahoma: University of Oklahoma Press. OCLC 1175397. ISBN 9780806120409
- Ford, John Salmon (1963). Oates, Stephen B. (ed.). Rip Ford's Texas. Austin, Texas: University of Texas Press. ISBN 0292770340
- Leckie, William H.; Leckie, Shirley A. (1967) The Buffalo Soldiers: A Narrative of the Negro Cavalry in the West. Norman, Oklahoma. University of Oklahoma Press. ISBN 0806183896
- Brown, Dee (1970). Bury My Heart at Wounded Knee: An Indian History of the American West. New York City: Holt, Rinehart & Winston. ISBN 0030853222. LCCN 2008270227. OCLC 110210.
- Newcomb Jr., William W. (1972) The Indians of Texas: from Prehistorics to Modern Times. Austin, Texas: University of Texas Press. ISBN 0292784252
- Fehrenbach, Theodore Reed (1974). Comanches, The Destruction of a People. Knopf. ISBN 0394488563.
- Haley, James L. (1976). The Buffalo War: the History of the Red River Indians Uprising of 1874. Austin, Texas: State House Press. ISBN 1880510588. LCCN 98007715.
- Hagan, William T. (1976). Quanah Parker, Comanche Chief. Norman, Oklahoma: University of Oklahoma Press. ISBN 0806127724. LCCN 92-31563.
- Nye, Wilbur Sturtevant. (1983) Carbine and Lance: The Story of Old Fort Sill. Norman, Oklahoma: University of Oklahoma Press. ISBN 0806171189 LCCN 79-13137
- Webb, Walter Prescott (1983). The Texas Rangers: a Century of Frontier Defense. Austin, Texas: University of Texas Press. doi:10.7560/734005. ISBN 978-0-292-74815-6. JSTOR 10.7560/734005.
- Schilz, Jodye Lynn Dickson; Schilz, Thomas F. (1989) Buffalo Hump and the Penateka Comanches. El Paso, Texas: Texas Western Press. ISBN 0874041791
- Chalafant, William Y. (1991) Without Quarter: the Wichita Expedition and the fight on Crooked Creek. Norman, Oklahoma. University of Oklahoma Press. ISBN 0806123672 LCCN 91-50300
- Fowler, Arlen L. (1996) The Black Infantry in the West, 1869-1891. Norman, Oklahoma. University of Oklahoma Press. ISBN 0806128836 LCCN 96-14945
- Exley, Jo Ella Powell (2001). Frontier Blood: The Saga of the Parker Family. Texas A&M University Press. ISBN 1603441093. LCCN 2001002241.
