= Pine Tree Mound =

Archaeological site in Texas

Coordinates: 32.4581°N 94.4184°W

Pine Tree Mound was the political and ceremonial center of the Nadaco Caddo Native American people located south of what is now Harrison County in Texas. Located between Potters and Starkey creeks, approximately 7.3 km north of the convergence of Potters Creek with the Sabine River floodplain, the site encompasses an upland area measuring 800 meters from east to west and 720 meters north to south. Dominating the landscape are three earthen mounds ranging from 0.4 to 2.4 meters in height above the terrain. These mounds, along with a potential buried mound, multiple off-mound structures, a plaza, and at least one burial ground, form the main site which covers an area of about 360 meters in both dimensions and spans 27 acres.

The Pine Tree Mound site was a prominent testament to the Titus phase of Caddo archaeology. It is now owned and preserved by the Archaeological Conservancy after being abandoned for centuries by its original inhabitants.

== History ==
According to radiocarbon data, occupancy of the region may have extended from as early as 1300 AD into the 1700s. It may have lasted long into the late 1700s, although radiocarbon calibration curve discrepancies prevent confirmation of this. The original inhabitants were not indigenous to Pine Tree but came from surrounding Caddo populations. Activity in Pine Tree Mound started relatively slow, but residential and ceremonial life began to peak between the early 1400s and 1500s, with an estimated population of 125 people before dwindling down by the later centuries. During the 1700s, inhabitants showed little to no connection to the community that once thrived in Pine Tree Mound, as there was now only one residential area and settlers often came from main villages located elsewhere. Throughout the eighteenth century, passersby traveling Trammel's Trace (an extension of the original Native American trail named the Hasinai Trace) frequently crossed Pine Tree Mound.

Neighboring archaeological sites residing upstream on the Sabine River such as the Wade site have been found to contain stylistic differences in their ceramics with those found in Pine Tree Mound, despite the relatively close proximity. However, the Loftis and Pearl sites, which are much closer geographically to Pine Tree Mound retain these artistic similarities indicating the geologically tight-knit cultural and social networks these early Caddo communities shared. Yet, certain rare and unique tools and trinkets were identified across Pine Tree and multiple Caddo territories, indicating that ties were likely shared among the Caddo elite.

=== Potential Spanish influence ===
Conquistador Hernando De Soto's initial expedition into Texas may have likely passed through this region following his death. It was led by Luis de Moscoso who took over leadership in June of 1542. Although hypothetical, evidence for this stems from infrequent Native American copies of typical Spanish vessels (glasses, wine glasses, chalices) potentially left behind during the entrada. Constructions of Moscoso's journey have hypothesized the use of the Hasinai Trail through Caddo territory, undoubtedly highlighting the possibility of interactions between the Spaniards and the Nadaco people. As a result, it has been suggested that any interactions between the two peoples could have implicated the population decline seen in the latter part of the fifteenth century by transmission of foreign diseases.

== Notable features ==
Intensive excavations in 2006 utilized sub-surface techniques such as ground-penetrating radar, electrical resistivity, and magnetic field gradients to record any geological anomalies around Pine Tree Mound. In conjunction with surveys done in 2004, the three main mounds were identified as terraces for ritual buildings that were encircled by roughly six off-mound ritual formations and a cemetery for the Nadaco elite. Houses were dispersed across eight potential residential areas in Pine Tree Mound each containing only a handful of houses. Further magnetic examinations revealed multiple circular structures and the possible existence of fire hearths used for cooking. Early Spaniards described these Caddo structures as containing an endless fire and have been regarded as fire temples to some.

=== Mounds A, B, and C ===
Mound A is the largest mound on the site. It stands at roughly 2.4 meters tall and encompasses an area of 55 x 45 m. While Mound C lies northeast of Mound A and is significantly smaller at 27 x 33 x 0.4 m. These two platforms were created relatively quickly and had no previous constructions before their formation. Mound B rests northwest of Mound A and shares similar dimensions to Mound C at 33 x 37 x 1.2 m. However, it differs in its formation as it was built over multiple constructions and deconstructions of significant buildings at this location. These mounds created a triangular formation around the plaza that lay isolated to the east of the main Nadaco houses. This is where the spiritual leaders would perform their ceremonies and unify the community.

Furthermore, archaeologists inferred from their analysis of burials that the alignment of the sunrise and specific stars, such as Antares and Sirius, held significance for the Nadaco. The orientation of Mound A allowed them to observe the sun rise over Mound C during the summer solstice in June. Additionally, the arrangement of Mound B and the cemetery in relation to Mound A corresponded with the northwest-southeast orientation of the burials, perpendicular to the summer solstice sunrise.

Before the site's historical excavations, the mounds had seen usage by cattle ranching in the 1960s. Using the large open pastures for grazing and the individual mounds for a ranch and a cattle feeder, all of which had since been removed.

=== Cemeteries ===
Excavations revealed two small cemeteries near family compounds, containing a total of 27 graves. These included single interments, with one grave possibly holding two individuals. Radiocarbon dating places the cemeteries' usage during the site's main occupation in the 1400s–early 1500s. The burials suggest social equality among families, with graves containing offerings such as pottery, arrow quivers, stone tools, smoking pipes, ear spools, and pigments. Moreover, symbolic placements, like green pigment containers facing east, were also observed.
