= Placido (Tonkawa leader) =

Plácido (ca. 1788–1862) was a major Chief of the Tonkawa people in Texas during the Spanish and Mexican rule, the Republic of Texas era, and with Texas as part of the United States.

== Early years in Texas ==
Plácido was born the son of a Tonkawa Chief and a Comanche female captive/slave. His mother having been Comanche is highly ironic, in that he became the greatest enemy the Comanche had in Texas. Plácido, known in his own language as Ha-shu-ka-na ("Can't Kill Him"), was the last major Chief of the Tonkawa Indians. The fierce Tonkawas became great friends of the white Texas settlers, helping them against all their enemies.

Plácido rose to power among the Tonkawas during the Long Expedition into Texas in 1819. Warriors from several tribes, including Placido and his Tonkawa, joined in James Long's venture and gained horses, other plunder, and scalps in battles with the Spanish army. After Carita, a prominent Tonkawa leader, died in 1823, Plácido was elected as head chief of his people by the chiefs and elders.

== The Chief and Stephen Austin ==
Plácido befriended Stephen F. Austin in the early days of Spanish Texas Settlement. His friendship was responsible for the Tonkawa support of the Texan forces, in the Texas War for Independence. Allied with the new republic, the Tonkawa felt secure in their central Texas home, near the Springs of the San Marcos River.

== Battle of Plum Creek ==
Though Texas histories make much of the Texas militia fighting the Comanche at Plum Creek after the Great Raid, most of those histories forget to mention that the Texans would not have been in a position to intercept Buffalo Hump and the returning raiders except for the help of Plácido and his men. With the help of Chief Plácido and thirteen of his Tonkawa scouts, Texas militia from Bastrop and Gonzales ambushed the raiding party at Plum Creek (near present-day Lockhart, Texas).

== Battle of Little Robe Creek ==
The last battle the Tonkawa fought with and for the Texans was the Battle of Little Robe Creek. Texas Governor Hardin Runnels had campaigned for office in 1856 on a platform to put an end to the continuing Comanche and Kiowa raids from those bands of both tribes off the reservation. He publicly expressed astonishment and rage when the 2nd United States Cavalry was transferred to Utah, and ultimately disbanded altogether.

Governor Runnels determined to reestablish disbanded Ranger battalions which were reduced after Texas' annexation by the United States. The result was that on January 27, 1858, Governor Runnels appointed John Salmon "Rip" Ford, a veteran Ranger of the Mexican–American War and frontier Indian fighter, as captain and commander of the Texas Ranger, Militia, and Allied Indian Forces, and ordered him to carry the battle to the Comanches in the heart of their homeland on the Comancheria.

Ford, whose habit of signing the casualty reports with the initials "RIP" for "Rest In Peace," was known as a ferocious and no-nonsense Indian fighter. Ford's reason for this was simple: Comanche raids were brutal in their treatment of settlers. Thus, Ford determined to meet brutality with brutality. Governor Runnels issued very explicit orders to Ford, "I impress upon you the necessity of action and energy. Follow any trail and all trails of hostile or suspected hostile Indians you may discover and if possible, overtake and chastise them if unfriendly.

=== Recruitment of the Tonkawa ===
On March 19, 1858, Ford went to the Brazos Reservation, near what today is the city of Fort Worth, Texas, and recruited the Tonkawa into his forces. Tonkawa Indians, the latter commanded by their "celebrated" chief, Placido, are hailed today as the "faithful and implicitly trusted allies.Without the Tonkawa, and their 100 experienced warriors, Ford simply did not have enough men to launch a campaign into the Comancheria.

After recruiting Placido, Ford undertook a campaign with approximately an equal number of Texas Rangers and Tonkawa Warriors against the Comanches. Ford and Placido were determined to follow the Comanche and Kiowa up to their strongholds amid the hills of the Canadian river, and into the Wichita Mountains, and if possible, "kill their warriors, decimate their food supply, strike at their homes and families and generally destroy their ability to make war".

In April 1858, Ford established Camp Runnells near what used to be the town of Belknap. Ford, still operating under Governor Runnell's explicits orders to "follow any and all trails of hostile and suspected hostile Indians, inflict the most severe and summary punishment," and to "allow no interference from any source". (That source was interpreted to mean the United States, whose Army and Indian agents might try to enforce federal treaties and federal statutory law against trespassing on the Indian territories in Oklahoma).

On April 15, Ford's Rangers, accompanied by Tonkawa warriors, and Anadarko and Shawnee scouts from the Brazos Reservation in Texas, crossed the Red River into Indian Territory. The force then advanced into the portion of the Comancheria in the Indian Territories in Oklahoma. Ford led his men across the Red River, into the Indian Territory, violating federal laws and numerous treaties, but stating later that his job was to "find and fight Indians, not to learn geography."

=== Battle ===
At sunrise on May 12, 1858. Ford and his joint force of Rangers and Tonkawa began an all-day battle with a dawn attack on a sleeping Comanche village. The so-called Battle of Little Robe Creek was actually three distinct separate incidents which happened over the course of a single day. The first was the attack on the sleeping village. The second was a follow-up attack on the village of Iron Jacket, somewhat further up the Canadian River. Iron Jacket, so named for the coat of iron mail he wore in battle was killed in this exchange, and the remainder of his village was saved by the timely intervention of Peta Nocona with a third force of Comanche who arrived to engage Ford while all the villages along the Canadian made a swift withdrawal. Before the withdrawal, a dozen Tonkawas were killed in single combat with Comanches whose challenge to single combat they accepted. Ford, enraged by the losses, finally forbid the Tonkawa to accept anymore.

Peta Nocona knew that his warriors were no match for the Rangers in an even exchange of gunfire, and had no intention of engaging in such an exchange. He used every trick available to him, including attempting to lure the Rangers and Tonkawas into individual duels, to delay the enemy so the villages upriver would be able to withdraw safely. In this, he was successful.

The Battle of Little Robe Creek was notable in that the Texan forces first, invaded the United States against every tenet of federal law and numerous Indian Treaties, attacked Indian villages without warning of any kind, and allowed their allied Indians, the Tonkawa, to eat some of the Comanche killed in battle.

== After Little Robe Creek ==
Despite their sacrifice for the Texans, the Tonkawa were endangered on the Brazos Reservation. Indeed, once a settler accused two Tonkawa warriors of killing a man, and Plácido fled, seeking refuge with other Indians—all of whom refused him sanctuary. Only the timely intervention of Robert Neighbors, who convinced the US military not to pursue the matter, kept the settlers from hanging Plácido. Increasing harassment by white settlers had made Texas increasingly dangerous for the Indian. In 1859, Indian agent Neighbors convinced the United States to allow the displacement of all the Texas tribes, (including Plácido and his Tonkawa), to a reservation in Indian Territory (Oklahoma).

In October 1862, when Confederate Indian agents arrived at the reservations, only the Tonkawa welcomed them, as Placido saw the Confederacy as an extension of his beloved Republic of Texas, which had valued his people. Unfortunately for the Tonkawa, other Indians never forgot the Tonkawa's loyalty to the Texans, even if the Texans did. Despite pleas from the aging Placido to protect his people from their enemies, the Tonkawa were not allowed to return to their reservation on the Brazos, and remained on a reservation in Oklahoma with the Delaware, Shawnee and Caddo tribes.

=== Tonkawa Massacre (1862) ===
On October 23, 1862, warriors from these tribes, instigated and assisted by the Comanche and Kiowa, united to attack the Tonkawas. Unlike Federal Indian agents like Neighbors, who had always protected the Tonkawas to the best of their ability, the Confederate agents Placido had welcomed so happily did not make any effort to protect them at all. One hundred thirty-seven out of the remaining 309 Tonkawas were killed in what was named the Tonkawa Massacre. Included in the dead was the elderly Placido.

=== Post-massacre ===
Plácido had two sons, Charlie and Little Spots. Their mother had also been a Comanche captive. After the 1862 slaughter of much of their tribe, the survivors, led by Plácido's son Charlie, fled to Fort Belknap, Texas, and remained there until the end of the Civil War. Today, Today less than 15 families of Tonkawa remain on their reservation in Oklahoma.

== See also ==
- Battle of the Neches
