= Antelope Hills, Oklahoma =

Antelope Hills
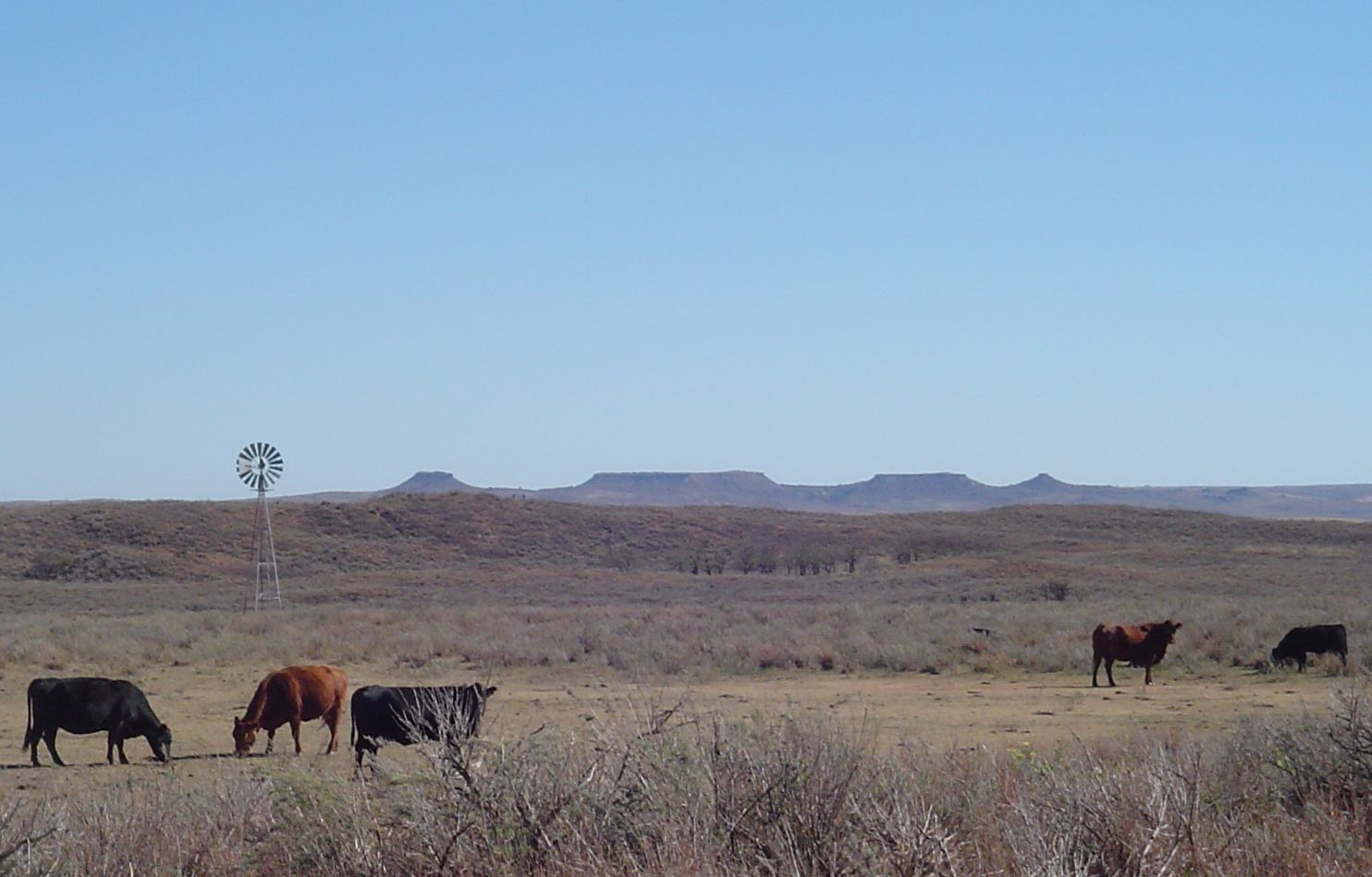
- The Antelope Hills

Highest point
- Elevation: 2,585 ft (788 m)

Geography
- Location within Oklahoma
- Country: United States
- State: Oklahoma
- District(s): Roger Mills County, Oklahoma
- Range coordinates: 35°54′15″N 99°53′04″W

The Antelope Hills are a series of low hills in the bend of the Canadian River in northwest Roger Mills County, Oklahoma, near the border between western Oklahoma and the Texas panhandle. They were a major landmark for the Plains Indians and travelers on what is now the western plains of Oklahoma. The area was part of the Cheyenne-Arapaho reservation until the Land Run of 1892 opened it to non-Indian settlement. The hills are on the National Register of Historic Places.

== History ==
According to the Encyclopedia of Oklahoma History and Culture, there is some evidence that prehistoric humans used this area as a hunting ground. Spanish explorer Francisco Vásquez de Coronado first mentioned these hills in 1541. In 1682, René Robert Cavelier, Sieur de La Salle claimed the area for Spain, which ceded it to France in 1800. It became part of the United States in 1803, through the Louisiana Purchase. The region was included in Indian Territory until Oklahoma Territory was formed in 1890, and had become the Cheyenne-Arapaho reservation in 1867. The Land Run of 1892 opened the area to non-Indian settlement, when it became part of County F. It became part of Roger Mills County after Oklahoma became a state in 1907.

Before the American Civil War, this area was part of Comancheria, because the Comanche tribe regarded the land as their hunting ground and cattle grazing land. They vigorously opposed settlements by white immigrants and non-indigenous Native Americans, leading to much destruction and bloodshed. The U. S. military was ineffective in stopping Comanche raids into Texas and Mexico. Finally, the Texas Rangers and some Native American allies began a campaign in 1858 to eliminate the problem. The campaign culminated in the Battle of Little Robe Creek on May 12, 1858.

After gold was discovered in California in 1848, the large number of people traveling west created a need for a wagon road. Captain Randolph B. Marcy was commissioned to lead a party to survey the route for such a road from Fort Smith to California. This became known as the California Road. Marcy described the Antelope Hills as, ". . . about one hundred and fifty feet high, of porous sandstone, and appear to be the result of volcanic action. They rise almost perpendicularly from the smooth prairie, are flat upon the top, and present every indication of having been raised out of the earth by volcanic agency. They are near the 100th degree of longitude, and are sometimes called the Boundary mounds, as being near the line formerly claimed by Texas as her eastern boundary."

The Antelope Hills area was added to the National Register of Historic Places on December 14, 1978.

This area is sparsely populated. The main economic activities are agriculture and petroleum production, because it lies atop the Ogallala Aquifer and the Anadarko Basin.

== Physical description ==
The surface was originally formed by sediments (sand, clay and caliche) carried down by streams from the Rocky Mountains. These eventually formed sandy, loam soils. Native plants are mostly prairie grasses and a few broadleaf trees, Wooded areas are mostly composed of cottonwood, willow, mesquite and eastern red cedar trees. Wildlife is mostly mule deer, white-tailed deer, pronghorn antelope, and rabbit. Avian species include bobwhite quail, Rio Grande turkey, and ring-necked pheasant.

== NRHP listing data ==
The Antelope Hills site (NRIS #78002259) was listed in 1978. The nearest community is Durham, Oklahoma.

- Historic Significance: Event
- Area of Significance: Exploration/Settlement, Agriculture, Military, Social History
- Period of Significance: 1900-1924, 1875-1899, 1850-1874, 1825-1849, 1800-1824
- Owner: Private
- Historic Function: Landscape
- Historic Sub-function: Conservation Area
- Current Function: Landscape
- Current Sub-function: Conservation Area

== See also ==
- Antelope Hills Expedition
