= Plum Creek (San Marcos River tributary) =

Coordinates: 29°37′51″N 97°35′52″W

- Map Map of Plum Creek

Location
- Country: United States
- State: Texas

Physical characteristics
- Mouth: San Marcos River

Plum Creek is a waterway that starts in Hays County, Texas and runs for 52 miles past Lockhart and Luling to its mouth at the San Marcos River.

It was the site of the Battle of Plum Creek on August 12, 1840.

== See also ==
- List of rivers of Texas
