= Fort Parker =

Former Crow Indian agency buildings in Montana, United States (1869–1875)

Coordinates: 45°42′48″N 110°24′01″W

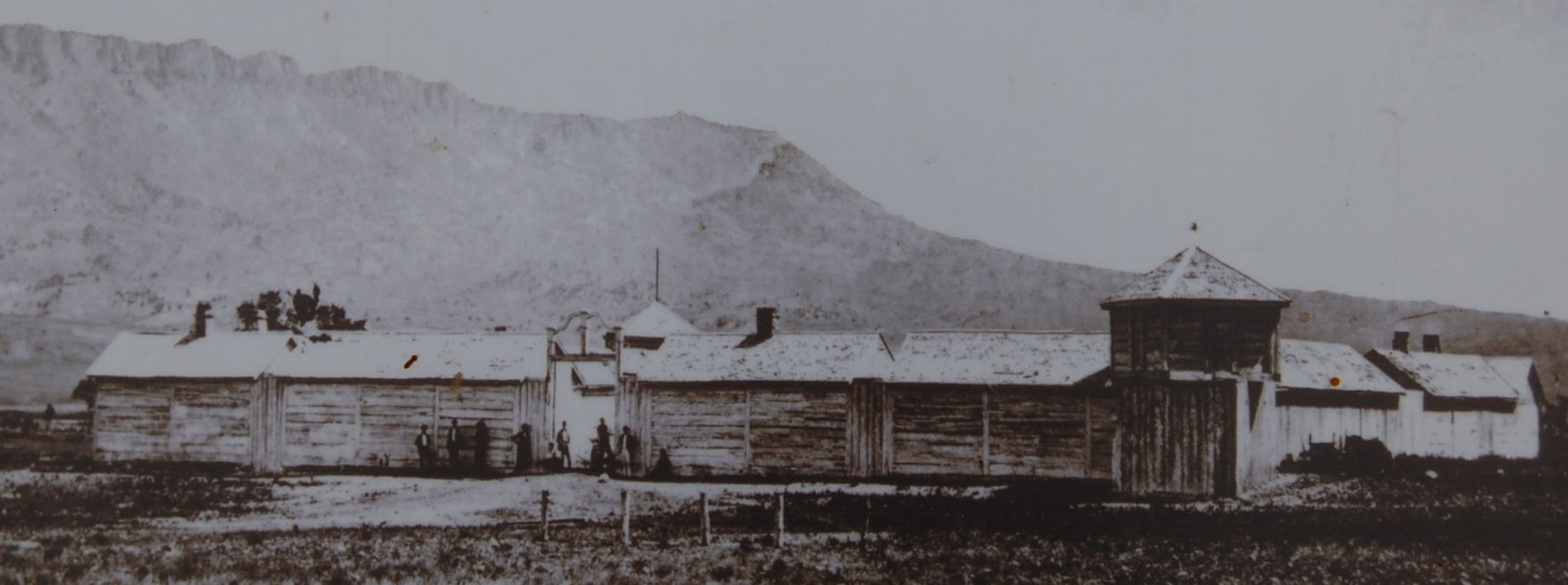
First structure at Fort Parker, Montana. William Henry Jackson Photograph, about 1872

The Fort Laramie Indian Treaty of 1868, which closed travel on the Bozeman Trail and in the Yellowstone Valley, stipulated that the re-defined Crow Reserve would have a new "centerpoint" or agency for the Crow. The first Crow Agency, which was supposed to be built where Big Timber is today, was eventually located about eight miles east of present-day Livingston in the year 1869.

Fort E. S. Parker, the first Crow Indian Agency, was built in the fall of 1869, southwest of present-day Springdale, Montana (Big Timber). It was named for Ely S. Parker, a Seneca lawyer who served as secretary to Ulysses S. Grant, wrote the Confederate terms of surrender, and was appointed as Commissioner of Indian Affairs under President Grant.

The first Crow Indian agency was in operation here from 1869 to 1875, until being moved eastward, in 1875, to Rosebud Creek Absarokee, Montana and eventually to its present and final location at Crow Agency in 1884. Thomas Leforge, a white Crow man, said it took its secondary name, the Mission Agency, "merely by reason of the fact that in those days and earlier most of the Indian agencies were set up where a Christian missionary enterprise had already been in operation. This was not the case here". James Wright, however, a Methodist minister and Crow Agent, tried to institute Christian learning in the Agency's boarding school in 1873.

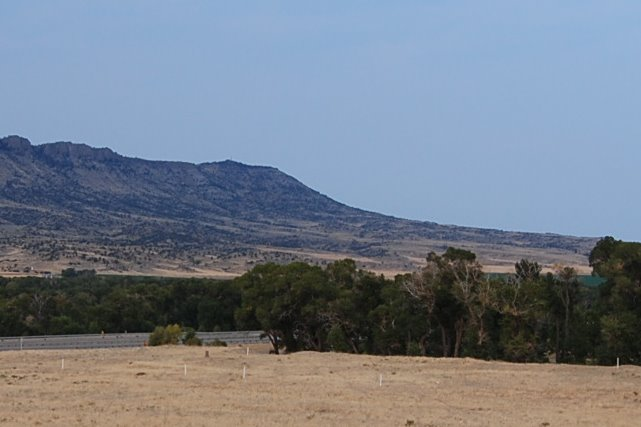
Present site of Fort Parker near Interstate 90 east of Livingston. White posts outline original site

The Agency was built on a commanding bluff about 40–60 feet above the valley floor. Mission Creek (or Skull or Rock Creek - This Creek was actually called "Scraping Hide Creek" by the Crow) flows just to the east of the Fort. The agency fort overlooks the Yellowstone River which is about a half a mile away. The fort / agency was constructed of square-hewn logs, shingle roof, with storehouses and living quarters for the agent, physician, engineer, miller carpenter, blacksmith, and school teacher, storehouses. It had two bastions that served as guard towers. The Agency burned down on October 30, 1872, and quickly replaced by buildings made of adobe, since timber was becoming scarce.

L.M. Black, a Bozeman businessman and trader, was temporarily placed in the position of first Crow Agent until Major E.M. Camp, the assigned agent took over in October, 1869. He was succeeded by a Fellows David Pease, a reputable businessman who was fluent in two Indian languages and married to a Crow Indian woman. Dr. James Wright, a Methodist minister, removed Pease from his duties by August 1873. Wright was replaced by Dexter Clapp, a former Union officer, just prior to the agency being moved east. The Agency was often a stopover for travelers on their way to explore Yellowstone National Park in the early 1870s.

The fort was built as a centerpoint for distributing Crow annuities and to encourage the Crow to take up farming. It was a difficult location to teach farming, due to constant winds, cold weather, and buffalo herds roaming northeast of the Agency. Several non-Native Americans, including local fur-trappers, interpreters, and F.D. Pease, the Indian Agent, married into the Crow Tribe. The Agency also acted as a line of defense for the people of Bozeman and Crow from assaults by the Sioux, Cheyenne, and Blackfeet tribes.

Fort Parker was abandoned in 1875, even though the Crow and locals from Bozeman and the Gallatin Valley opposed the move east (further into country dominated by the Sioux). Just before the move to Rosebud Creek, near present-day Absarokee, the Bozeman Grange communicated a letter of support for the Crow and the Agency on the Yellowstone:

… as it is a conceded fact that the tribe of Crow Indians are worth a regiment of troops in the Gallatin Valley. While they are on their Reservation no raids are made by the hostile Indians, and the settlers feel safe and secure, … if the Agent would justly distribute the annuities and expend the money appropriated in purchasing the supplies, there would be no trouble to keep the Indians on their reservation."

== Bibliography ==
- Hannings, Bud (2006). Forts of the United States: An Historical Dictionary, 16th through 19th Centuries. Jefferson, North Carolina: McFarland. ISBN 978-0-7864-1796-4.
