= Battle of Plum Creek =

1842 Battle Between Comanches and Texas Rangers

- Part of the Texas–Indian wars
| Date | August 12, 1840 |
| Location | Lockhart, Texas 29°53′2.1186″N 97°40′4.67″W |
| Result | Inconclusive |

Belligerents
| Republic of Texas; Tonkawa | Comanche |

Commanders and leaders
| Mathew Caldwell; Edward Burleson; Chief Placido; Ben McCulloch; Felix Huston | Buffalo Hump, but effective control of the war party had broken down |

Strength
| Approximately 200 | Estimates range from 400 to 1,000. |

Casualties and losses
| One killed, seven wounded Comanche claimed 11 killed | Unknown; 12 bodies recovered, Texans claimed 87 killed at Plum Creek |
- Location within Texas

The Battle of Plum Creek was a clash between allied Tonkawa, militia, and Rangers of the Republic of Texas and a huge Comanche war party under Chief Buffalo Hump, which took place along Plum Creek near Lockhart, Texas, on August 12, 1840, following the Great Raid of 1840 as that Comanche war party then returned to west Texas.

== Background ==
Following the Council House Fight of 1840 a group of Comanches led by the Penateka Comanche War Chief Buffalo Hump, warriors from his own band plus allies from various other Comanche bands, raided from West Texas all the way to the coast and the sea. These Comanches were angered by the events of the Council House, in which Texans had killed the Comanche Chiefs who, after failing to deliver all of their Texan and Mexican prisoners for release, resisted being taken prisoner themselves.

=== The Council House Fight ===
The Texan officials began the treaty talks with demands that were unacceptable or impossible to fulfill for the Comanches, such as the Comanche return all white captives, including the famous captive Cynthia Parker. Other white captives were with bands of the Comanche not represented at the talks. As a show of good faith the Comanche chiefs brought in two captives, a Mexican boy and an adolescent girl named Matilda Lockhart. The Texans thought they were going against their word, because the Comanche chiefs did not return all of the white captives and figured they held back some of their white captives to guarantee their own safety. Outraged with the outward signs of torture and mutilation on the body and face of the fourteen year old Matilda, and the account of successive gang rape she had suffered, the Texans exercised a premeditated plan of violating the immunity of the peace delegation. The Texas militiamen told the chiefs it was they that would indeed be held hostage to guarantee the release of their other white captives. Everyone panicked and drew their weapons. The militia began firing and the entire Comanche peace delegation was killed.

=== The Great Raid of 1840 ===
But Buffalo Hump was determined to do more than merely complain about what the Comanches viewed as a bitter betrayal. Spreading word to the other bands of Comanches that he was raiding the white settlements in revenge, Buffalo Hump led the Great Raid of 1840. On this raid the Comanches went all the way from beyond the Edwards Plateau in West Texas to the cities of Victoria and Linnville on the Texas coast. In what may have been the largest organized raid by the Comanches to that point on Texas settlements, or an attack by Indians on any white city in the continental United States, they raided and burned these towns, plundering at will. Linnville was the second largest port in Texas at that time. On the way back from the sea the Comanches were confronted by Texas rangers and militia in a fight called the Battle of Plum Creek (near the modern town of Lockhart).

== The Battle of Plum Creek ==
The "battle" was really more of a running gun fight, as the Comanche war party was trying to get back to the Llano Estacado with a huge herd of horses and mules they had captured, a large number of firearms, and other plunder such as mirrors, liquor, and cloth. Volunteers from Gonzales under Mathew Caldwell and from Bastrop under Ed Burleson gathered to intercept the Comanches. Joined by Ranger companies and armed settlers hastily assembled as militia from central and east Texas, they confronted the Indians at Good's Crossing on Plum Creek, near the modern town of Lockhart (about 27 miles south of Austin). According to Arizona historian Robert M. Utley, the battle of Plum Creek was a disaster for the Comanche. Most of the loot they took was recovered, and the Texans involved in the battle suffered only one death.

Thomas J. Pilgrim took part in the Battle of Plum Creek.

== Aftermath ==
While the Comanche were forced to retreat, and lost a large amount of their loot, they succeeded in protecting their women and children who came with them to the raid. Furthermore, the vast majority of the horses taken in the raid did not fall into Texan hands, with only several hundred being retaken out of more than 3,000.

John Moore and the La Grange volunteers hunted down a Comanche war party that had escaped the battle and all but exterminated them. Buffalo Hump continued to raid white settlements until 1844, when he negotiated peace, and after Texas acquired statehood he agreed to settle his band into the Treaty of Council Springs, while European settlers took over the former Comanche land. Buffalo Hump went on to the Comanche reservation in 1856, but left after two years of starvation, fleeing to the Wichita Mountains where his band was attacked by U.S. troops, who forced them back on to the reservation. The town of Linnville never recovered from the Great Raid, since most of its residents moving to Port Lavaca, the new settlement established on the bay three and one half miles southwest by displaced Linnville residents.

== Online sources ==
- Media related to Battle of Plum Creek at Wikimedia Commons
- Buffalo Hump, Texas Indians.com
- Battle of Plum Creek, Lone Star Junction
- Plum Creek battlefield received a historic marker in 1978. Battle of Plum Creek: near intersection of US 183 and SH 142 in Lions Park: Texas marker #9783
