= Peta Nocona =

Comanche chief (c. 1820–1864)

Peta Nocona (Lone Wanderer)

Quahadi Comanche leader

Personal details
- Born: c. 1820 Comancheria
- Died: c. 1864 (aged 43–44)
- Cause of death: Died from infection due to battle wound
- Spouse: Cynthia Ann Parker also known as Narua
- Children: Quanah Parker; Pecos; Topsannah (Topʉsana; Prairie Flower)
- Parent: Iron Jacket (Puhihwikwasu'u) (father)
- Known for: 1840–1860 led the Quahadi (also Kwahado, Quahada) Comanche band during the Texas–Indian wars; Father of the last Comanche chief Quanah Parker

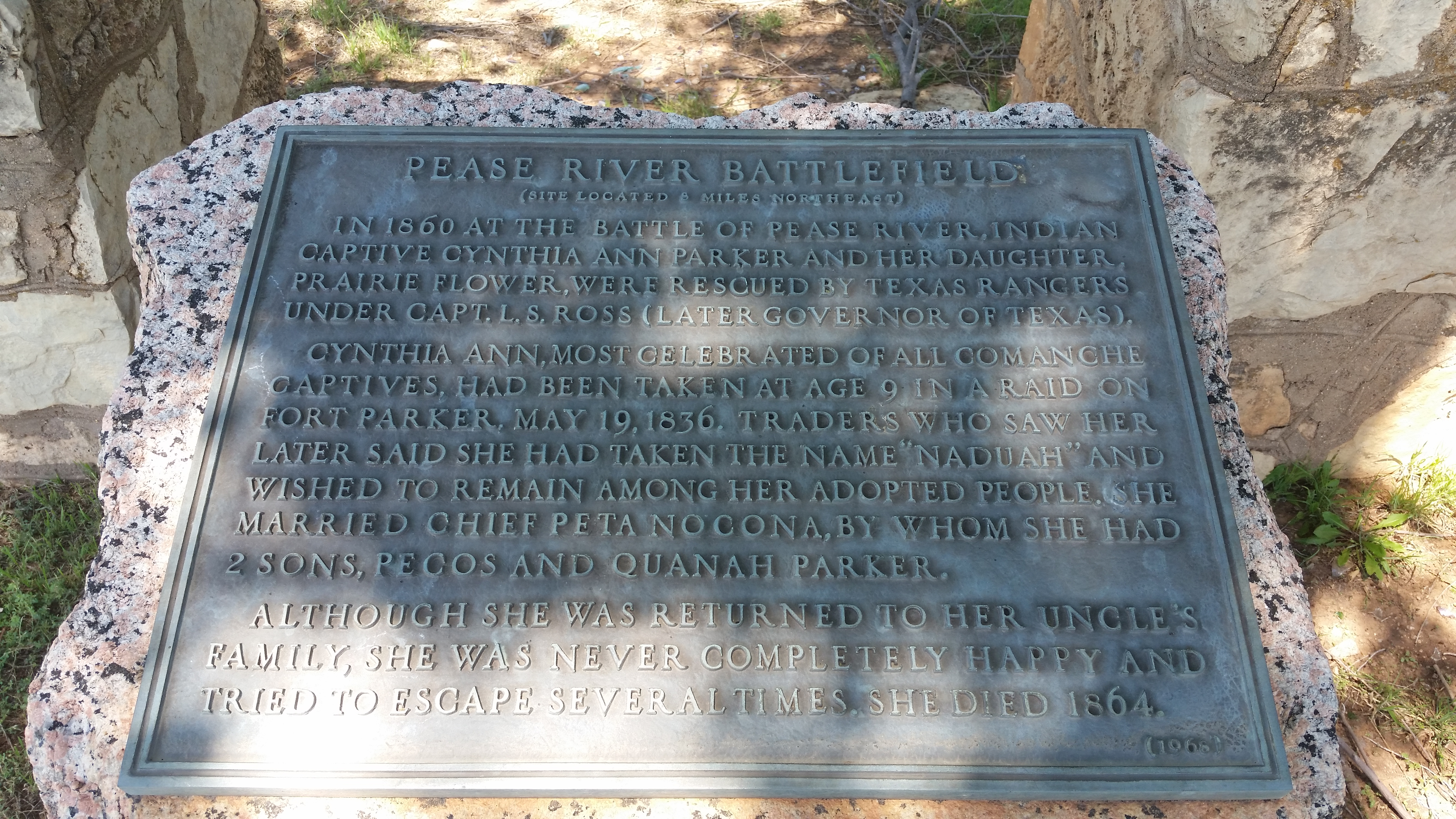
Texas historical marker in Crowell, Texas

Peta Nocona, also known as Puhtocnocony, or Tah-con-ne-ah-pe-ah (c. 1820 – 1864), the son of Puhihwikwasu'u, or Iron Jacket, was a chief of the Comanche Quahadi (also known as Kwahado, Quahada) band. He married Cynthia Ann Parker, who had been taken as a captive during the Fort Parker massacre in 1836 and was adopted into the tribe by Tabby-nocca's family. Among their three children was Quanah Parker, the last war chief of the Comanche.

Peta Nocona chose his wife from among the members of the Nokoni band. He led his tribe during the extensive Indian Wars in Texas, from the late 1840s until the 1860s, as the United States tried to suppress his people. He was the son of the Quahadi Comanche chief Iron Jacket. He became so renowned that a legend said that "his" band, the Nokoni (or Wanderers, or Travellers) band, were named for him, but the name of the Nokoni people had long antedated him, and, anyway, he was a Kwahadi, having a Nokoni wife. The city of Nocona, Texas is named after him.

Despite Sul Ross's claim that Peta Nocona was killed at Pease River, his son Quanah insisted he was not present at the site of that battle, and died several years later. This claim is supported by contemporary Texas historian John Henry Brown. Brown had already disputed the identity of the person killed at Mule Creek, before Quanah Parker came onto the reservation, stating he was told the name of the man killed at Pease River was Mo-he-ew, not Peta Nocona. Quanah Parker then wrote an affidavit disputing his father's death: "while I was too young to remember the chief, it is likely that Brown was correct" (but the killed warrior's name results to have been Nobah, a former captive adopted in the tribe, and Col. Wilbur S. Nye personally met Peta Nocona time after the Pease River's fight and his claimed death).

== Fort Parker Massacre ==
Cynthia Ann Parker was born to Silas M. Parker and Lucy Duty Parker in Crawford County, Illinois. Considerable dispute exists about her age, as according to the 1870 census of Anderson County, Texas, she would have been born between June 2, 1824, and May 31, 1825. Because of the Americans' war-fighting ability against the Indians, the Mexican government had originally encouraged Americans to establish frontier settlements to block the continuing raids of the Comanche deep into Mexico. Consequently, the Parker clan, which had a long history of frontier settlement and fighting, was encouraged to settle in Texas. When Cynthia was nine years old, her family and extended kin moved to Central Texas and built Fort Parker, a log fort, on the headwaters of the Navasota River in what is now Limestone County. Her grandfather, Elder John Parker, the patriarch of the family, had negotiated treaties with the local Indians who were subject to the Comanches, and historians conjecture that he believed those treaties would bind all Indians and that his family was safe from attack.

However, the customs of the Comanche regarding treaties made by their subject tribes did not limit the Comanche as to their raison d'etre of being a raiding nation. Consequently, when the Comanche raiding season began, Fort Parker was one of the many settlements subject to the Comanche raiding custom. With substantial militia forces focused on guarding the Texans during the Great Scrape, all of the frontier settlements were woefully unprepared and undermanned for the invasion.

On May 19, 1836, a huge force of Nokoni Comanche warriors (at the time the head chief of the Nokoni band was Huupi-pahati, to English-speaking people "Tall Tree"), about 500 strong, accompanied by Kiowa and Kichai allies, who had also been promised by the Mexicans rich booty and hundreds of white females and slaves, made a raid against Limestone County, and a war group attacked the fort in force, killing most of the men. The Comanche, though, ordered some of the children spared for slavery into the tribe. Thus, after the attack, the Comanches seized five captives, including Cynthia Ann. Following the defeat of Mexico in the Texas War of Independence, the new government shifted its attention toward recovering the thousands of children and women captured during the invasion.

== Cynthia Ann Parker and Peta Nocona ==
For his role in leading many raids and the strong allegiance given him, Peta Nocona's band became recognized as a pre-eminent one. Afterward, his Kwahadi band was often confused with the Nokoni Comanche, the people who had adopted his wife when she was taken captive as a child. Peta Nocona married Cynthia Ann Parker (Naduah), a white captive who had been adopted by the Nokoni Comanche (her foster father was Tabby-nocca). Peta Nocona never took another wife, although it was common among the Comanche for such a successful war chief to do so. The couple had three children, including Quanah Parker, who also became noted as a war chief, another son named Pecos (Pecan), and a daughter named Topsannah (Prairie Flower).

The Texans never gave up on trying to find each of the captives taken during the raids and wars. Although hundreds were either ransomed or eventually rescued in Texas Ranger and Scout expeditions, many others remained in the hands of the Comanche, including those who remained by their own desire. In reprisal, the Texans launched a series of retaliatory attacks on Comanche settlements, finally forcing the war-chiefs to sue for peace. The negotiations for the end of hostilities and the return of the captives was to take place in San Antonio. However, at the subsequent negotiations, the Comanches' aggressive posture and known behavior of quickly attacking anyone led to a series of confrontations during the meeting and full-scale violence.

Peta Nocona's wife and daughter were captured and his band scattered on December 18, 1860, by Captain Lawrence Sullivan Ross and his Texas Rangers and militia at the Pease River fight.

== Death ==
While Peta Nocona's death is a matter of dispute, the destruction of his band is not. In early 1860, Peta Nocona led his band in a raid through Parker County, Texas, which had been named in honor of his wife's family after their massacre. After the raid, he returned with his band to what he believed was a safe retreat under the sandstone bluffs of the Pease River near where Mule Creek flowed into the stream. The site was long a favorite of the Comanche, providing both cover from the fierce "blue northers" that hit the plains, and ample forage for their ponies, with easy buffalo hunting from the nearby herds.

The settlers had reacted to the Comanche raids with pressure in Austin to protect them. Texas Governor Sam Houston commissioned Ranger Captain Sul Ross to organize a company of 40 Rangers and 20 militiamen to put a stop to the raids. The company of 60 was based at Fort Belknap, in Young County.

Ross quickly realized he did not have enough men to defend the frontier. He decided to take the offensive to the Indians. To this end, he began to scout the area for sign of Indian camps, determined to confront them at the earliest opportunity. After Peta Nocona's raid into Parker County, Ross and his fighters started tracking the Kwahadi, who were considered the hardiest fighters among the Comanche. The tribe overall was thought to be the fiercest of the Plains Indians. Modern research has revealed that Peta Nocona did not intend to stay at Pease River, and was preparing to move on when his camp was attacked.

At daybreak on December 18, 1860, Ranger Captain Ross had sent scouts to the area along the Pease River, where his scouts reported a fairly large hunting party and camp on the banks. With an oncoming blue norther blotting out sign, Ross moved close to the location of Peta Nocona's Kwahadi on the Mule Creek head bank.

Ross sent a detachment of 20 men, of his force of 60, to position themselves behind a chain of sand hills to cut off retreat to the northwest. With the remaining 40 men, Ross led the charge into the Indian camp. The band was taken completely by surprise, and its members were massacred, either shot down where they stood or were killed by the 20 men to the north as they attempted to flee in that direction. The American forces shot the men, women, and children indiscriminately. Sul Ross wrote, quoted in Indian Depredations, by J. W. Wilbarger, that they fired at everyone present.

The attack was so sudden that a considerable number were killed before they could prepare for defense. They fled precipitately right into the presence of the sergeant and his men. Here they met with a warm reception, and finding themselves completely encompassed, everyone fled his own way, and was hotly pursued and hard pressed.

Two distinct versions of Peta Nocona's death are given. The first is that he died trying to escape with his wife and infant daughter, which is the generally believed account, and the one officially reported by Sul Ross. Seeing that the camp was hopelessly overrun, Chief Peta Nocona and his wife Cynthia Ann fled to the east up a creek bed. Reportedly, mounted behind Peta Nocona was a 15-year-old Mexican girl, while Cynthia Ann carried her two-year-old child, Topsannah. Captain Ross and his lieutenant, Tom Killiheir, pursued the man they believed to be Peta Nocona.

Accounts vary as to what happened. Captain Ross, who was acclaimed a hero for the deed, claimed and probably honestly believed that he had caught and killed Peta Nacona, but in the melee, he pursued and shot a former Peta Nocona Mexican slave, whose Comanche name was Nobah, who was trying to save the fleeing Comanche women.

Quanah Parker, the chief's oldest son, once reportedly said in Dallas to Sul Ross, "No kill my father; he not there. I want to get it straight here in Texas history. After that, two year, three year maybe, my father sick. I see him die." Certainly, Quanah Parker told both friend and foe that his father had survived the massacre of his band, and died 3–4 years later of complications from old war wounds suffered against the Apache. In this account, strongly supported by the oral history of the Comanche people, Peta Nocona was away from the camp and hunting with Quanah Parker and a few other men when the attack occurred.

Several years after Pease River and the later death of his father, Quanah Parker was introduced into the band of his mother's people, the Comanche Nokoni (also called Destanyuka, not necessarily because of the taboo of the famous dead chief's, Quanah Parker's father, name). Chief Horseback (alias Kiyou) took his brother Pecos and him under his wing. Quanah Parker temporarily had left the Kwahadi band, then led by Pawʉʉra-o-coom (Bull Bear) as first chief and Kobay-o-burra (Wild Horse) as second chief.

Until Peta Nocona died, he had taken care of his sons. Quanah Parker had not learned that his mother was White until Cynthia Ann Parker was abducted and forced back into White society, and he learned he was of mixed blood. Neither of his parents had discussed his white ancestry before. According to Quanah Parker and his warriors, Peta Nocona was a broken and bitter man after Pease River. He was never the same after his wife was taken from him, and died sometime around 1863 or 1864 of complications of old war wounds incurred fighting the Apaches, and from grief at the loss of his wife and infant daughter.

Nye claimed that he encountered men who saw Peta Nocona alive several years after Pease River when he was ill with an infected war wound. This version strongly supports Quanah Parker's claim that his father survived Pease River and died 3–4 years later. Nye confirmed Quanah Parker's account that Peta Nocona and Cynthia Ann Parker had been an exceptionally happy couple, and the forced separation killed them both: Cynthia Ann Parker starved herself to death, and Peta Nocona withered away.

== Fictional and dramatic representations ==
- The 2008 miniseries Comanche Moon featured Peta Nocona as a minor character, played by Alan Tafoya.
- 1982 novel Ride the Wind by Lucia St. Clair Robson
