= Belknap, Texas =

Belknap
- Ghost town
- Location within Texas
- Coordinates (Cemetery): 33°09′08″N 98°43′59″W
- Country: United States of America
- State: Texas
- County: Young County
- Elevation: 1,175 ft (358 m)
- Time zone: UTC-6 (CST)
  - Summer (DST): UTC-5 (CDT)

Belknap is a ghost town in Young County, Texas, United States. It was the first county seat of Young County and was located across from Fort Belknap.

== History ==
Belknap was built about one-half mile east of Fort Belknap. In 1856, it became Young County's first county seat and acquired a post office on August 14. The townspeople traded with the fort and travelers. Beginning in 1858, the Butterfield-Overland Mail ran a trail through the town. By that time, 150 people lived in Belknap, and the town included a saloon, the post office, and several stores. During the Civil War, the population plummeted. The fort was largely abandoned and the residents feared Indian attacks. On November 5, 1866, the post office halted operations. In 1867, federal troops returned to the fort, but abandoned it 5 months later due to low water in the area.

By 1870, only 70 people lived in Belknap. The post office returned on January 20, 1874. However, later that year, Graham became the new county seat. The military post closed in 1876. By 1880, only 40 people remained in the town, but the post office wasn't disbanded until 1908. While the fort was restored in 1936, the town was never recreated. Today, the graveyard and a few houses are all that remains of the town.

== Geography ==
Belknap is located about half a mile east of Fort Belknap, in Young County, Texas, United States, and near the border of a military reservation. It is about 15 miles northwest of the Brazos River Indian Reservation. Little of the town remains today.
