= Comancheria =

Former region of the US Southwest occupied by the Comanche people

Comancheria Nʉmʉnʉʉ Sookobitʉ
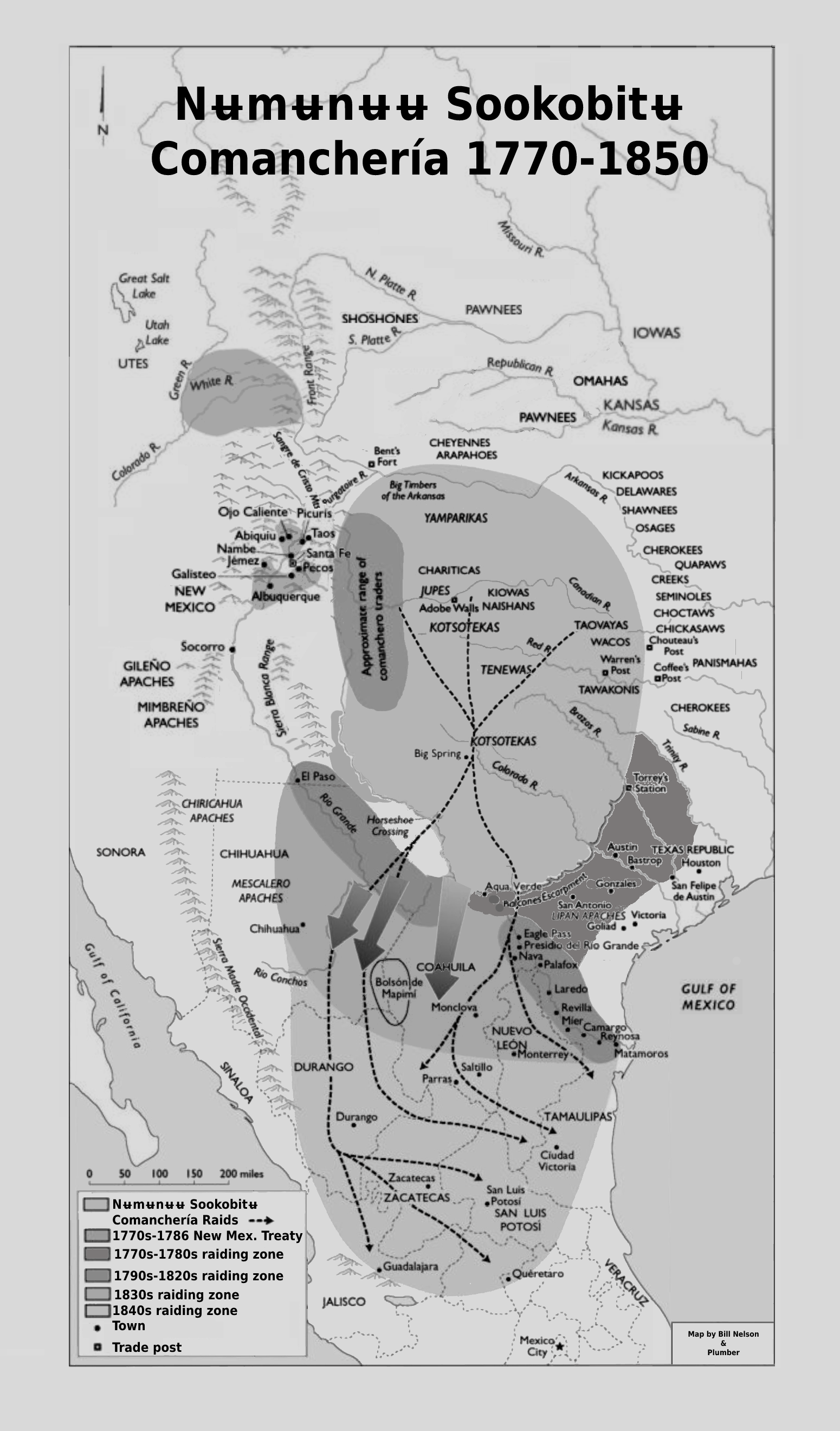
- The development of Comancheria from 1770 to 1850. Depicted are the shifting core territories of the Comanche, their zones of control, and their extensive raiding zone which extended from Texas and New Mexico deep into Mexico.
- Common languages: Nʉmʉ Tekwapʉ̲
- Demonym: Nʉmʉnʉʉ
- Today part of: United States and Mexico

Nʉmʉ / Kɨmantsi 'person' / 'enemy, stranger'
- Person: Nʉmʉ
- People: Nʉmʉnʉʉ (Comanche)
- Language: Nʉmʉ Tekwapʉ̲ Mootekwaʔpʉ̠ (Hand Talk)
- Country: Nʉmʉnʉʉ Sookobitʉ (Comancheria)

Comancheria (Comanche: Nʉmʉnʉʉ Sookobitʉ, 'Comanche land'; Spanish: Comanchería), also known as the Comanche Empire, was a large Comanche polity covering modern New Mexico, West Texas, and nearby areas that was occupied by the Comanche before the 1860s. The historian Pekka Hämäläinen has argued that Comancheria formed an empire at its peak, and that view has been echoed by other historians.

== Geography ==
The area was vaguely defined and shifted over time but can be generally described as bordered to the south by the Balcones Fault, just north of San Antonio, Texas, and continuing north along the Cross Timbers to encompass a northern area that included the Cimarron River and the upper Arkansas River east of the Rocky Mountains. Comanchería was bordered along the west by the Mescalero Ridge and the Pecos River, continuing north along the edge of the Spanish settlements in Santa Fe de Nuevo México. It also included West Texas, the Llano Estacado, the Texas Panhandle, the Edwards Plateau (including the Texas Hill Country), Eastern New Mexico, western Oklahoma including the Oklahoma panhandle and the Wichita Mountains, southeastern Colorado and southwestern Kansas.

== History ==
=== Background ===
Before the Comanche expanded from present-day Wyoming in the early 18th century, the lands that became known as Comancheria were home to a multitude of tribes, most notably the Apaches. Much of the region had previously been known as Apacheria.

=== Greatest extent and possible empire ===
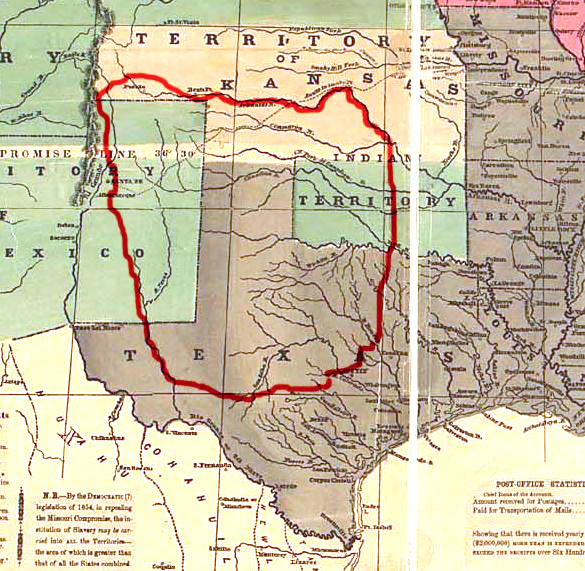
Map of Comancheria

Some historians have begun to consider Comancheria, at the peak of its power, as an empire. This concept was based on ideas developed by Pekka Hämäläinen who argues that from the 1750s to the 1850s, the Comanches were the dominant group in the Southwest and developed a form of imperialism. Confronted with Spanish, Mexican, and American outposts on their periphery in New Mexico, Texas, Louisiana, and Mexico, they worked to increase their own safety, prosperity and power. According to Hämäläinen, disease was the single most dangerous threat to Native Americans. The Comanche managed to avoid disease, which gave them an upper hand over the Apaches and other tribes in this area. Also, the Comanche exchanged goods with Europeans. The main thing that the Comanche exchanged and gave them power was horses, which expanded their military power and allowed them to hunt more buffalo. The Comanches used the military power to obtain more supplies and labor from the Americans, Mexicans, and Indians through expropriation, tribute, and kidnappings. Although powered by violence, their empire was primarily an economic construction, rooted in an extensive commercial network that facilitated long-distance trade. Dealing with subordinate Indians, the Comanche spread their language and culture across the region.

By the early 1830s, the Comanche began to run out of resources in Comancheria. At this time, they had been conducting raids deep into Mexico and would take what they got back to Comancheria. In the mid-1830s, the Comanche formed a colony in Mexico, called the Bolson colony. Conditions in the colony were similar to those in Comancheria when it was winter in the north. Eventually, there was a drought, and Comancheria, and the Bolson colony struggled. Also, the empire collapsed after their villages were repeatedly decimated by epidemics of smallpox and cholera in the late 1840s, which caused their population to plunge from 20,000 to just a few thousand by the 1870s.

The Comanche resolved most of the challenges facing them in the 1830s with adroit diplomacy. Their strategy was flexible. With New Mexico, a Mexican province to their west, they enjoyed friendly trading relations. New Mexico was more of an asset than a threat to the Comanches, and the New Mexicans avoided war with the Indians. In 1841, Governor Manuel Armijo was ordered by the Mexican central government to join a military campaign against the Comanche, but he declined: "To declare war on the Comanches would bring complete ruin to the Department of New Mexico." In 1844, New Mexican officials learned of but did nothing to prevent a Comanche raid on Chihuahua.

With their western flank secured by an unthreatening New Mexico, the Comanche dealt with rivals on their northern and eastern borders. In 1835, they met with a delegation of American soldiers and eastern Indians in the Wichita Mountains of Oklahoma and concluded a peace agreement. The agreement permitted eastern Indians and the Americans to hunt on Comanche lands and did not restrain the Comanche and their Kiowa and Wichita allies from making war on Mexico. With their eastern flank secured by the treaty with the Americans, the Comanches next concluded a peace agreement in 1840 with the southern Cheyenne and Arapaho, who were pressing on them from the north. The agreement was highly favorable to the Cheyenne and Arapaho since they were permitted to reside and hunt on the buffalo and horse-rich Comanche lands. In addition, the affluent Comanche gave them gifts, including as many as six horses to every Cheyenne and Arapaho man. The Comanche's welcome to both tribes, their southern bands numbering perhaps 4,000, was both an acknowledgment that they were formidable rivals and also that the Comanche were short on men and resources to maintain their control over Comancheria.

South and southeast of Comancheria were the fast-growing Anglo-American communities in the Mexican territory of Texas. In the 1820s and 1830s most Comanche raids were in the southern parts of Texas and affected the largely-Hispanic population around San Antonio, Laredo and Goliad. After the Texas Revolution asserted independence from Mexico in 1836, the Comanche had to deal with the Republic of Texas. Texas's first president, Sam Houston, was knowledgeable about Indians and favored a policy of accommodation with the Comanche.

Continued Comanche raids led to the election in 1838 of Mirabeau B. Lamar, who favored a more aggressive approach. The massacre of 12 Comanche chiefs attending a peace conference in San Antonio in March 1840 set off a series of bloody reprisals and battles. Hundreds of Comanches descended upon and destroyed the towns of Victoria and Linnville in 1840. Although the Texans demonstrated they could defeat the Comanche at the Battle of Plum Creek, military campaigns emptied their treasury in what became the Texas–Indian Wars, and Texas became more accommodating. In 1844, the Texans and the Comanches came to an agreement, which recognized Comanche lands and left Comancheria intact.

The agreements with the United States and neighboring tribes, as well as the hiatus in the struggle with Texas, freed up the Comanche to make unrestrained war on the Mexican provinces south of the Rio Grande. The 1830s demonstrated that the Texans, the United States, and neighboring tribes all had the ability to invade Comancheria and attack the Comanche homeland. Mexico, in contrast, was rich in horses and unable to counterattack because of distance and the fact that after 1836, any Mexican military expedition against Comanches would have had to pass through lands claim by Texas, a republic whose independence Mexico did not recognize. In attacking Mexico, the Comanche seemed motivated by opportunity, economics, and revenge, and their animosity toward non-Comanches was sharpened by decades of war and reprisals. Thus, their raids on Mexico became increasingly bloody and destructive.

=== Neighboring peoples ===
To the west, southwest and southeast of Comancheria stretched the vast territories of the various hostile Apache groups, partially overlapping and forming a kind of no man's land, which was heavily contested between the two peoples. Moreover, the Comanche had to pass through the dangerous Apacheria on their way down to Mexico for raiding and recross it with plunder. The Oklahoma and Texas panhandles were inhabited by their allies, the Kiowa and Kiowa-Apache, along with the Comanche. In the northwest of Comancheria, lived the opposing Ute and Shoshone, to the northeast settled the enemy and powerful Osage and in the north the also antagonistic Pawnee. In addition, in and adjacent to Comancheria, were settled the allied Wichita, Tawakoni, Waco, and Hasinai. In the east, lived the Caddo and later the Cherokee and the Choctaw.

In the southeast, the Comanche's former allies, the Tonkawa, settled; however they became rivals after the expulsion of the Apache of the Plains. In the north, the Southern Cheyenne Arapaho, forced the Comanche to acknowledge the Arkansas River as their northern border. Moreover, the Comanche undertook extensive commercial enterprises to the Pueblo in New Mexico and to the Spanish settlements around San Antonio. In the trade of guns, horses, captives, and other goods, the Comanchero (Pueblo and New Mexico traders) acted as intermediaries. The Ciboleros also competed with the Comanche in the context of bison hunting. The Comanche language became the lingua franca of the Southern Plains.

== See also ==
- Comanche history
- History of New Mexico
- Comanchero

== Bibliography ==
- DeLay, Brian, The War of a Thousand Deserts. New Haven: Yale U Press, 2008
- DeLay, Brian, "The Wider World of the Handsome Man: Southern Plains Indians Invade Mexico, 1830-1848." Journal of the Early Republic, Vol. 27, No. 1, Spring 2007, pp. 83–113
- Hämäläinen, Pekka (2008). The Comanche Empire. Yale University Press. ISBN 978-0-300-12654-9.
- Weber, David J. The Mexican Frontier, 1821–1846, Albuquerque: U of NM Press, 1982
