= Tonkawa =

Native American tribe in Oklahoma

Tonkawa Tickanwa•tic
- Seal of the Tonkawa Tribe of Oklahoma

Total population
- more than 700

Regions with significant populations
- United States (Oklahoma, formerly Texas)

Languages
- English, formerly Tonkawa language

Religion
- Christianity, Native American Church, traditional tribal religions

Related ethnic groups
- Coahuiltecan

The Tonkawa are a Native American tribe from Oklahoma and Texas. Their Tonkawa language, now extinct, is a linguistic isolate. Today, Tonkawa people are enrolled in the federally recognized Tonkawa Tribe of Indians of Oklahoma, headquartered in Tonkawa, Oklahoma. They have more than 700 tribal citizens.

== Name ==
The Tonkawa's autonym is Tickanwa•tic (IPA: [tit͡skanwaːtit͡s], meaning "real people"). The name Tonkawa is derived from the Waco word, Tonkaweya, meaning "they all stay together".

== History ==
In 1601, the Tonkawa people lived in what is now northwestern Oklahoma. They were made up of related bands. Historically, they were nomadic people, who practiced some horticulture.

The Tonkawa, long thought to have been prehistoric residents of Texas, are now thought to have migrated into the state in the late 17th century. Their arrival in Central Texas is believed to have been just before or during the early European contact period.

=== 18th century ===
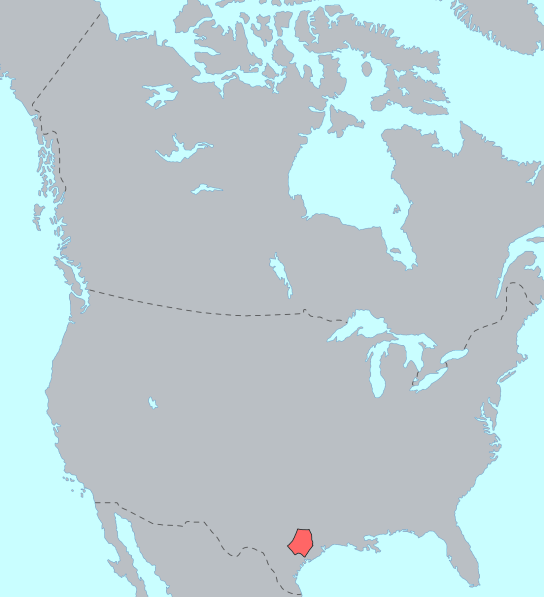
Tonkawa lands around the 18th century

By 1700, Apache and Wichita people had pushed the Tonkawa south to the Red River, which forms the border between current-day Oklahoma and Texas. In the 16th century, the Tonkawa tribe probably had around 1,900 members. Their numbers diminished to around 1,600 by the late 17th century due to fatalities from European diseases and conflict with other tribes, most notably the Apache.

In the 1740s, some Tonkawa were involved with the Yojuanes and others as settlers in the San Gabriel Missions of Texas along the San Gabriel River.

In 1758, the Tonkawa, along with allied Bidais, Caddos, Wichitas, Comanches, and Yojuanes, went to attack the Lipan Apache in the vicinity of Mission Santa Cruz de San Sabá, which they destroyed.

The tribe continued their southern migration into Texas and northern Mexico, where they allied with the Lipan Apache.

=== 19th century ===
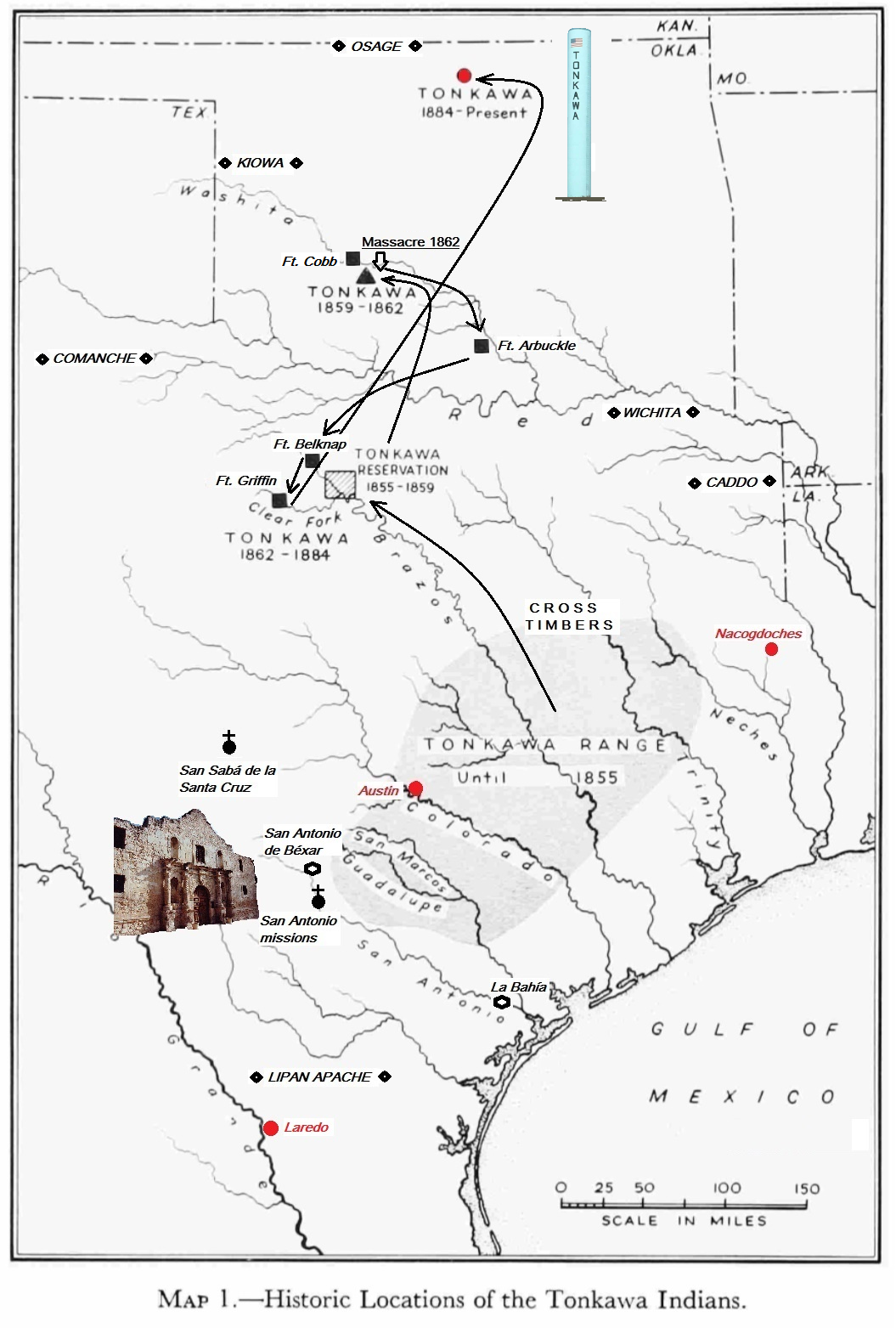
The way from Texas to Tonkawa Tribal Reserve, Oklahoma

While the Tonkawa often allied with Texans against other tribes, conflicts with the Texans did occur. Correspondence of Stephen F. Austin to Jose Antonio Saucedo, May 19, 1826, provides explanation for an attack made by Texans of San Felipe, Texas, on the Tonkawa that year: "...[the Tonkawa] had stolen from the settlers 20-odd hogs, and a large quantity of corn. A small party of neighbors went to the Indians' villages to arrest the thieves; the Indians presented their arms and refused to give up the guilty persons." Those who had lost the property came to Austin with their complaints and Austin intervened, sending for Tonkawa Chief Carita and telling him the Tonkawa "must keep out of the settlement [San Felipe de Austin] and deliver up the thieves for punishment by flogging, otherwise they should be shot; after this understanding they [the Tonkawa] withdrew from the settlement. This took place about 18 months since [i.e. 1824]." Austin goes on to explain that this did not resolve the issue completely, and subsequent claims of theft resulted in more conflicts between San Felipe de Austin's colonists and the Tonkawa.

In 1840 at the Battle of Plum Creek and again in 1858 at the Battle of Little Robe Creek, the Tonkawa fought alongside the Texas Rangers against the Comanche. March 5, 1842, the Mexican Army under Ráfael Vásquez (general) marched into Texas and seized San Antonio. Months later in support of the Republic of Texas, the Tonkawa and Lipans were mustered for an expedition against the Mexican invasion: "We understand that the whole tribe of Lipans and Tonkewas (sic) have been ordered to move to the vicinity of Corpus Christi, to accompany the army on its march to the Rio Grande". While the capital city of Austin north of San Antonio was partially evacuated in response to the Mexican invasion, no credible evidence has been found to support claims that residents of Austin invited the Tonkawa to camp at today's Republic Square for mutual protection from Comanche raids, thereby saving Austin from destruction.

By 1838, the Tonkawas' main camp was near Bastrop, Texas, 30 miles (48 km) east of Austin. The camp was on the east side of the Colorado River, below Alum Creek, on lands claimed by General Edward Burleson. William Bollaert, English writer, geographer, and ethnologist traveled through Texas in 1842 to 1843 visiting the Bastrop camp August 22, 1843. He met with "Chief Campos (sic)" and visited a dry-goods store, where Tonkawa were busy trading with residents of Bastrop. Campo had recently returned from a buffalo hunt, and later that year planned to "visit the coast .. to see the ocean and hunt mustangs and deer". Bollaert's eye-witness account of the tribe in Bastrop shows a people still confident in their ability to move about. Earlier that year, news arose of a split in the tribe, one group heading to the Rio Grande, raising Texas' concern of an alliance with Mexico, but as was reported, "The main body of the tribe is still in the vicinity of Bastrop, and the chiefs profess to be still faithful to our Republic of Texas government". The group that split from the main tribe was described as "10 camps or families" comprising about "30 or 40 warriors".

In 1859, the United States forcibly removed the Tonkawa and other Texas Indian tribes to the Wichita Agency in Indian Territory, and placed them under the protection of nearby Fort Cobb.

During American Civil War, the Tonkawa allied with the Confederacy. Texas also declared for the Confederacy, so the federal troops at the fort received orders to march to Fort Leavenworth, Kansas, leaving the Indians at the Wichita Agency unprotected. On October 24, 1862, pro-Union tribes, including the Delaware, Shawnee, and Osage, decimated the Tonkawa in the Tonkawa Massacre. After the attack on the Tonkawa, by the summer of 1863, some survivors began migrating back south into Texas, some going as far as Central Texas, including Austin. As the capital of a Confederate state, Austin during the Civil War was fortified anticipating Union attack, so provided a refuge for the pro-Confederate tribe.

After the Civil War, Texas being a Confederate state, Union forces occupied Texas, and in 1867, as many as 135 Tonkawa were escorted back north from Austin to Jacksboro, Texas, by the Indian agent for the United States. That same year, the Tonkawa were then resettled on a reservation near Fort Griffin in Shackelford County. Later, in 1884, the Tonkawa were forced to move from Fort Griffin in Texas to the Oakland Agency in northern Indian Territory, present-day Kay County. They arrived on June 29, 1885, and have remained there to the present. This journey involved going to Cisco, Texas, where they boarded a railroad train that took them to Stroud in Indian Territory, where they spent the winter at the Sac and Fox Agency. The Tonkawas traveled 100 miles (160 km) to the Ponca Agency, and arrived at nearby Fort Oakland on June 30, 1885. (Note: From 1879 to 1885, some of the Nez Perce people who had surrendered at the end of the Nez Perce war had lived at Fort Oakland, near the present site of Tonkawa, Oklahoma)

On October 21, 1891, the tribe signed an agreement with the Cherokee Commission to accept individual allotments of land.

=== 20th century ===
By 1921, only 34 tribal members remained. Their numbers have since increased to close to 950 as of 2023. The Tonkawa Tribe of Oklahoma incorporated under the Oklahoma Indian Welfare Act in 1938.

=== 21st century ===
On December 12, 2023 the Tonkawa Tribe purchased Sugarloaf Mountain, near Gause, in Milam County. The mountain figures into a number of tribes' histories and is along El Camino Real de los Tejas National Historic Trail near the site of Rancheria Grande. The tribe knows it as "Red Mountain" and is a part of their origin story. The tribe partnered with El Camino Real de los Tejas National Historic Trail Association with plans to make it into a historic park.

== Government ==
The Tonkawa Tribe is led by an elected president and council.

As of 2025, the current administration is:

- President: Russell Martin
- Vice President: Patrick Waldroup
- Secretary Treasurer: Racheal N. Starr

== Economy ==
The Tonkawa tribe operates several businesses which had an annual economic impact of over $10,860,657 in 2011. Along with several smoke shops, the tribe runs three different casinos: Tonkawa Indian Casino and Tonkawa Gasino located in Tonkawa, Oklahoma, and the Native Lights Casino in Newkirk, Oklahoma. The Tonkawa Hotel and Casino has a steakhouse, the Buffalo Grill and Lounge.

== Land ==
Map of Tonkawa Tribe of Oklahoma's tribal jurisdictional area (OTSA) and nearby jurisdiction areas.

The Tonkawa's tribal jurisdictional area is in Kay County, Oklahoma, and their headquartered are in Tonkawa, Oklahoma.

A 60-acre property (24 ha), was purchased by the Tonkawa Tribe in 2023 in commemoration of its status as a site sacred to the Tonkawa. Sugarloaf Mountain, the highest point in Milam County, Texas, will become part of a historical park.

== Institutions and events ==
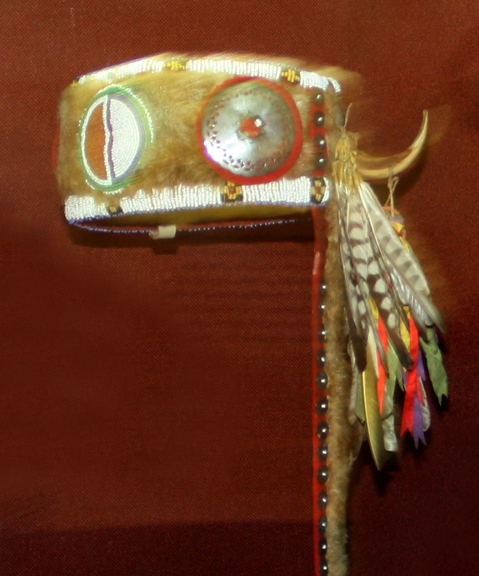
Tonkawa otter pelt turban, circa 1880, Oklahoma, Oklahoma History Center

The tribe owns the Tonkawa Tribal Museum in Tonkawa, Oklahoma, which shares the history and culture of the tribe through photographs, art, and artifacts with free admission. They also maintain the Tonkawa and Nez Perce cemeteries.

The annual Tonkawa Powwow is held on the last weekend in June to commemorate the end of the tribe's own Trail of Tears when the tribe was forcefully removed and relocated from its traditional lands to present-day Oklahoma.

The City of Austin and leadership from the Tonkawa Tribe celebrated Austin-Tonkawa Friendship Day on September 12, 2024.

== Tonkawa bands ==
The Tonkawa were made up of various groups. These groups are generally counted as Tonkawa:

- Cava
- Emet
- Ervipiame
- Mayeye
- Quiutcanuaha
- Sana
- Tenu
- Tetzino
- Tishin
- Toho
- Tohaha
- Tonkawa (proper)
- Tusolivi
- Ujuiap
- Yojuane, possibly

Additional bands, such as the Nonapho, Sijame, and Simaomo may have also been Tonkawan bands.

== Notable Tonkawa ==
- Plácido (ca. 1788–1862), chief who allied with Stephen F. Austin
- Clara Archilta (Tonkawa/Apache/Kiowa, 1912–1994), painter and beadworker

== See also ==
- Eurycea tonkawae
- Tonkawa Tribal Housing, Oklahoma

== Bibliography ==
- Swanton, John Reed (2003). The Indian Tribes of North America. Genealogical Publishing Company. pp. 326–27. ISBN 9780806317304.
