= Nadaco =

Native American tribe

The Nadaco, also commonly known as the Anduico, are a Native American tribe from eastern Texas. Their name, Nadá-kuh, means "bumblebee place."

== History ==
The Nadaco were part of the Hasinai branch of the Caddo Confederacy and occupied territory in present-day East Texas.

Spanish explorers encountered the tribe in 1542 in east Texas. Around 1700, the tribe joined the Hasinai but kept their distinct identity and culture. In 1716, Spanish monks founded the San José Mission to serve the Nadaco and the Nasoni tribes. By 1787, they lived in villages along the northern part of Panola County, Texas.

By Texas Independence in 1836, the tribe had moved to the forks of the Trinity River. During the winter of 1838-39 the Texans forced the Nadaco from their ancestral homelands into Indian Territory. Disliking the harsh conditions in Indian Territory, the tribe returned to Texas in 1843, settling along the Brazos River. After Texas became a state, the United States federal government signed a treaty with the Nadaco and neighboring tribes; however, their lands were soon overrun by European-American settlers.

In 1859, the Nadaco were again removed to Indian Territory to lands near the Wichita Agency. Their principal leader Lesh was killed in 1862, and many of the tribe fled to Kansas to avoid Civil War hostilities. Several Indian tribes allied with Confederate forces in Indian Territory, and there were skirmishes with Union troops. The Nadaco returned to the Territory in 1867. In 1862 the Wichita-Caddo Reservation was established, and the Nadaco joined the greater Caddo Nation there.

In 1950, an estimated 449 Nadaco lived in Caddo County, Oklahoma.

Today, Nadaco people are enrolled as members in the federally recognized Caddo Nation of Oklahoma, headquartered in Binger, Oklahoma.

== Synonymy ==
Beside Nadaco and Anduico, the tribe is also known as the Nadacoco, Nadan, Nadargoe, Nondacao, Nondaco, and Nadarko.

== Namesakes ==
Anadarko, Oklahoma is named for the tribe. A joke that might have some historical veracity is when the town was founded, residents suggested that it would be appropriate to name the town after "a Nadarko." Another possibly is that the additional "A" was simply a clerical error.

Anadarko Creek, an upper branch of the Angelina River in Texas is also named for the tribe.
