= American Indian Wars =

Frontier conflicts in the United States, 1609–1890s

- Part of European colonization of the Americas, the Territorial expansion of the United States and Manifest Destiny
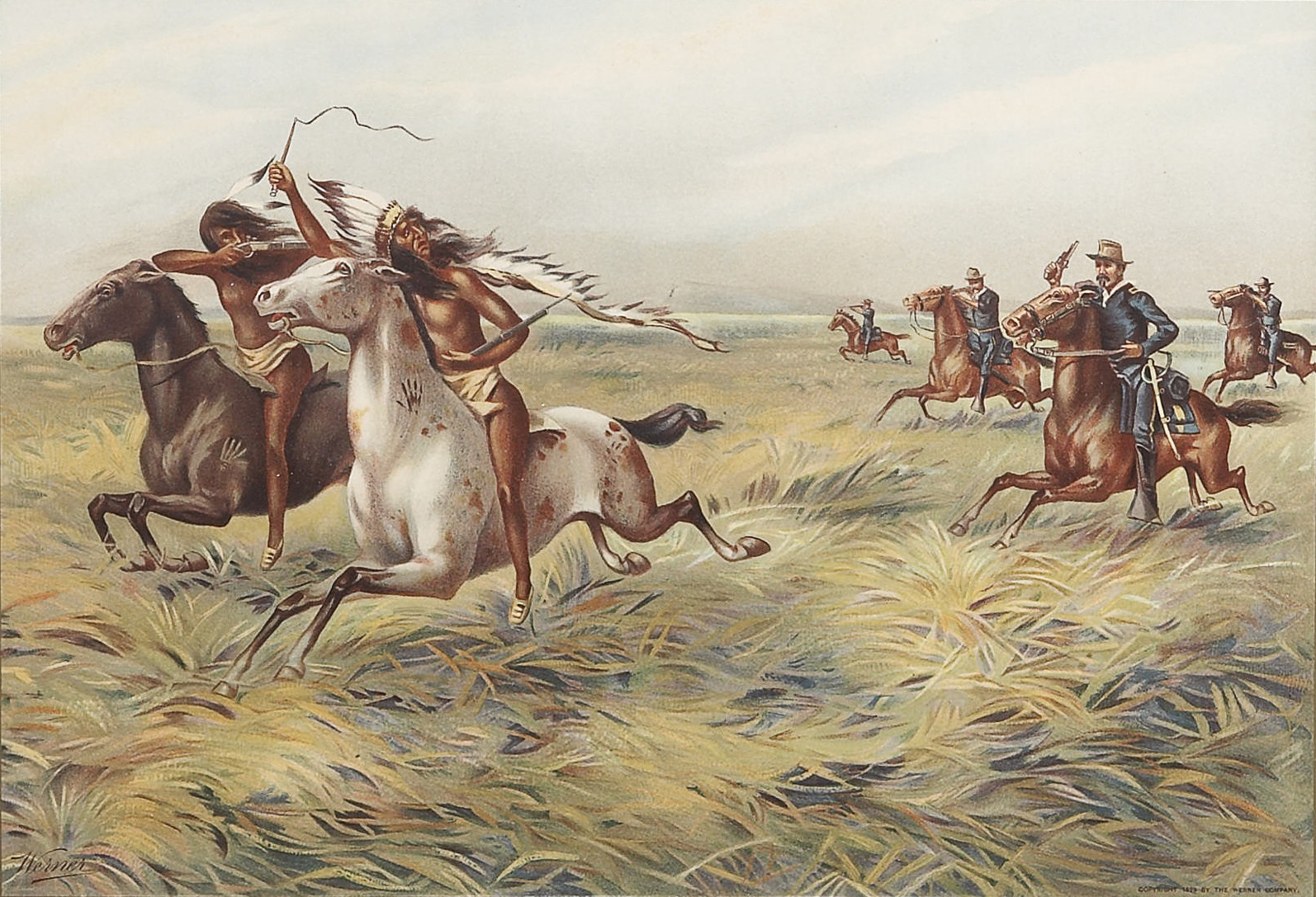
- 1899 chromolithograph depicting the Great Sioux War of 1876
Date	1609–1890
Location	United States with spillover in Alaska, Canada, and Mexico
Result	European Colonist Victory: Sovereignty of various combatants extended or lost; Massive American Indian population decline; Deportation and forced assimilation of Indian tribes; Many treaties, truces, and armistices made and broken by all belligerents; Indian reservations established in the United States

Belligerents
North American Indians: American Indians, including the tribes: the Cherokee, Comanche, Creek (Muscogee), Lakota, Miami, Shawnee, Seminole, Wampanoag, Northwestern Confederacy and Tecumseh's Confederacy Alaska Natives	Colonists, Viceroyalties and European empires: Kingdom of England; Kingdom of Scotland; British Empire: British America; Kingdom of Great Britain; United Kingdom; British North America; Dominion of Canada; Thirteen Colonies French colonial Empire: Kingdom of France; New France Spanish Empire: Kingdom of Spain; Council of the Indies; Viceroyalty of New Spain Dutch Empire: New Netherland (yes) Swedish Empire: (yes) New Sweden Russian Empire: Russian America United States; Union Mexico Republic of Texas Confederate States North American Indians (Note: Various rival American Indian tribes fought against each other, while making alliances with different European colonial factions.)

The American Indian Wars, also known as the American Frontier Wars, and the Indian Wars, (Note: Indian has been used in keeping with page name guidelines because of the historical nature of the page and the precision of the name similar to Federal Indian Policy. The use of the term Indian also provides relevant context about the era in which the conflicts took place. Use of Indian is limited throughout the page to proper nouns, quotes and references to government legislation.) were initially fought by European colonial empires, the United States, Confederate States and Republic of Texas against various American Indian tribes in North America. These conflicts occurred from the time of the earliest European colonial settlements in the 17th century until the end of the 19th century. The various conflicts resulted from a wide variety of factors, the most common being the desire of settlers and governments for tribal lands. The European powers and their colonies enlisted allied American Indian tribes to help them conduct warfare against each other's colonial settlements. After the American Revolution, many conflicts were local to specific states or regions and frequently involved disputes over land use; many involved retaliatory violence.

As American settlement expanded westward after the American Revolution, conflicts between the United States and American Indian nations increased in scale and frequency. A major turning point came during the War of 1812, when American Indian confederacies in the Old Northwest and the Southern United States allied with the British against the United States. Following the war, armed resistance continued in some regions, but relations between the United States and Indian nations were increasingly governed through treaties that transferred large areas of American Indian land to the United States. Historians have noted that the United States frequently went against upholding treaty obligations, contributing to recurring disputes and further conflict.

The Indian Removal Act of 1830 authorized the president to negotiate treaties exchanging American Indian lands east of the Mississippi River for lands in the west. Although the act itself provided for negotiated removals, federal and state authorities subsequently used a combination of treaties, political pressure, and coercion to relocate many Indian nations from the southeastern United States to Indian Territory. The resulting removals, including the Trail of Tears, transferred millions of acres of American Indian land to the United States and opened much of the Southeast to American settlement.

As American settlement expanded across the Great Plains and the Western United States, the federal government increasingly confined American Indian peoples to Indian reservations through treaties, military campaigns, and congressional legislation.

American Indian tribes and confederacies often achieved significant military victories against American settlers and soldiers, but generally lacked the population, resources, and logistical capacity to sustain prolonged resistance against the expanding United States.

Some scholars have characterized aspects of United States policies toward American Indians, including forced removals, warfare, and reservation policies, as constituting genocide against American Indians. Other scholars dispute the application of the term genocide to the American Indian Wars as a whole, arguing that the conflicts varied significantly across time and place.

== Colonial periods (1609–1774) ==
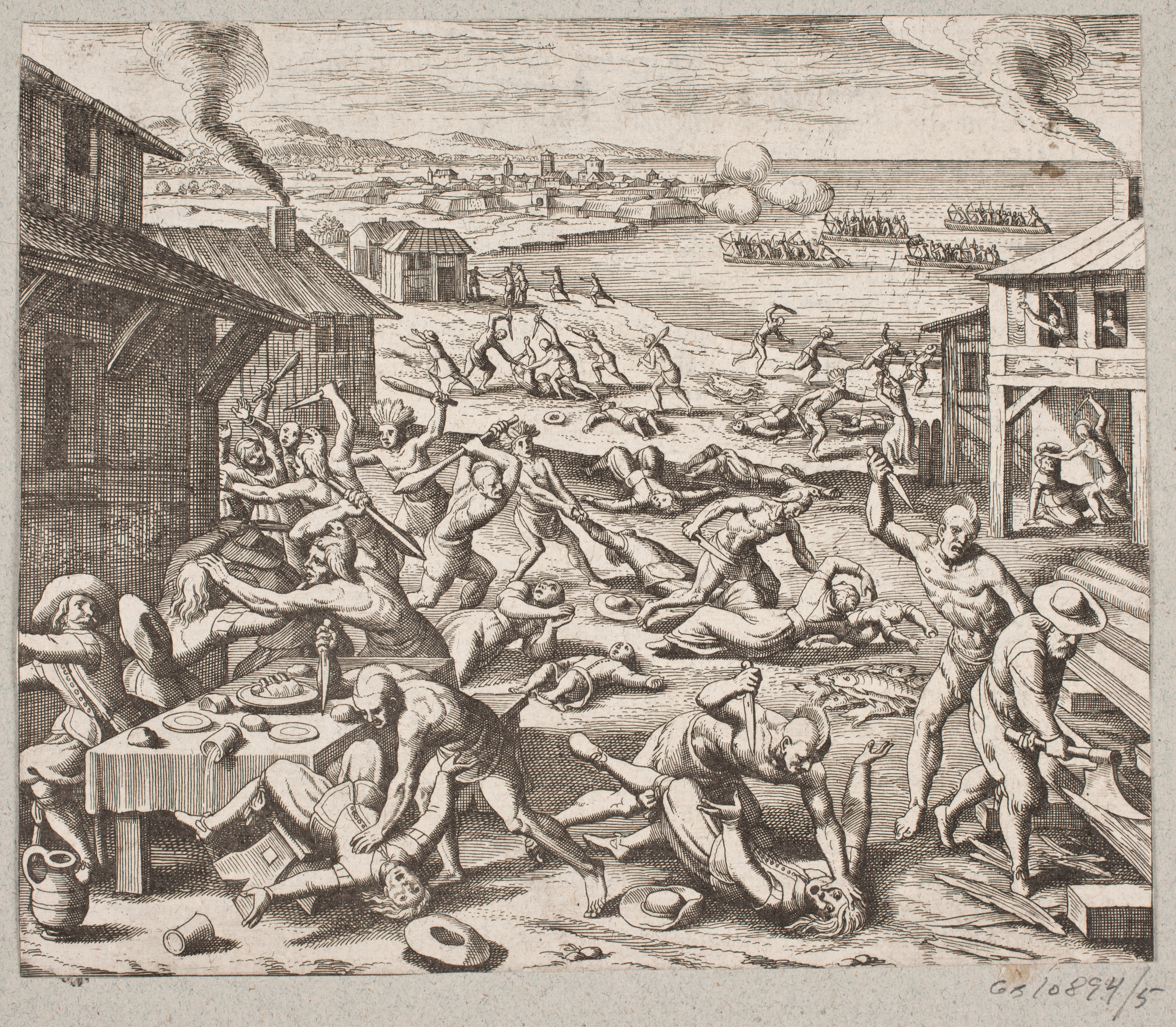
Jamestown Indian massacre of 1622

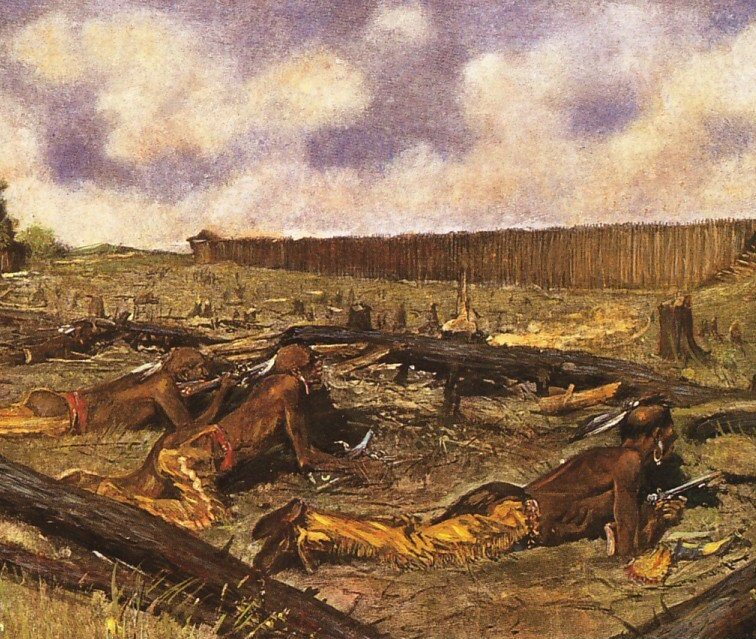
Siege of Fort Detroit during Pontiac's War in 1763

The colonization of North America by English (British), Spanish, French, Russian and Dutch was resisted by some American Indian tribes and assisted by others. Wars and other armed conflicts in the 17th and 18th centuries included:

- Beaver Wars (1609–1701) between the Iroquois and the French, who allied with the Algonquians
- Anglo-Powhatan Wars (1610–1614, 1622–1632, 1644–1646), including the 1622 Jamestown Massacre, between English colonists and the Powhatan Confederacy in the Colony of Virginia
- Pequot War of 1636–38 between the Pequot tribe and colonists from the Massachusetts Bay Colony and Connecticut Colony and allied tribes
- Kieft's War (1643–1645) in the Dutch territory of New Netherland (New Jersey and New York) between colonists and the Lenape people
- Peach War (1655), the large-scale attack by the Munsee on several New Netherland settlements
- Esopus Wars (1659–1663), conflicts between the Esopus tribe of Lenape Indigenous people and colonial New Netherlanders in Ulster County, New York
- King Philip's War (Metacom's Rebellion) (1675–78) in New England between colonists and the local tribes including, but not limited to, the Nipmuc, Wampanoag, and Narragansett
- Chowanoc War (1675–1677) in the Province of Carolina
- King William's War (1688–1697) between England and France, and their Indigenous allies, in New France, New England, and the Province of New York
- Tuscarora War (1711–1715) in the Province of North Carolina
- Yamasee War (1715–1717) in the Province of South Carolina
- Dummer's War (1722–1725) in northern New England and French Acadia (New Brunswick and Nova Scotia)
- Pontiac's War (1763–1766) in the Great Lakes region
- Lord Dunmore's War (1774) in western Virginia (Kentucky and West Virginia)

In several instances, the conflicts were a reflection of European rivalries, with American Indian tribes splitting their alliances among the powers, generally siding with their trading partners. Various tribes fought on each side in King William's War, Queen Anne's War, Dummer's War, King George's War, and the French and Indian War, allying with British or French colonists according to their own self interests.

On 14 August 1784, Russian fur traders led by Grigory Shelikhov attacked a fortified Alutiiq refuge at Awa'uq (Refuge Rock) on Sitkalidak Island in present-day Alaska. Hundreds of Koniag Alutiiq people were killed during the assault in what became known as the Awa'uq Massacre.On 14 August 1784, Russian colonists had massacred 200–3,000 Koniag Alutiiq tribesmen in Sitkalidak Island, Alaska. This massacre is known as Awa'uq Massacre. Despite the incidents that occurred between European colonists and the American Indian population, most tribes were friendly towards the Swedish colonists in New Sweden as result of Swedish authorities respecting tribal land.

== East of the Mississippi (1775–1842) ==
Following the American Revolution, British officials in Canada maintained alliances with American Indian nations in the Old Northwest and continued to supply them with trade goods and weapons. American leaders rightly believed that British support encouraged American Indian resistance to U.S. expansion into the trans-Appalachian West. British policymakers also considered the creation of a American Indian buffer state in the Great Lakes region as part of the peace negotiations that ended the War of 1812.

Many Indian nations, including those allied with Tecumseh, sided with the British during the war in an effort to resist further American settlement. Following Tecumseh's death at the Battle of the Thames in 1813 and subsequent American victories under commanders including William Henry Harrison, Native resistance in the Old Northwest was significantly weakened. The war also intensified existing rivalries among Native nations, with different tribes and factions supporting opposing sides or pursuing their own regional interests.

Many refugees from defeated tribes went over the border to Canada; those in the South went to Florida while it was under Spanish control as they would be considered free, and not slaves, under the Viceroyalty of New Spain. During the early 19th century, the federal government was under pressure by settlers in many regions to expel American Indian tribes from their areas. The Indian Removal Act of 1830 signed by President Andrew Jackson, stated the "authorizing of the President to grant lands west of the Mississippi in exchange for American Indian lands within existing state borders." Some tribes resisted relocation fiercely, most notably the Seminoles in a series of wars in Florida. They were never defeated, although some Seminoles migrated to Indian Territory. Other tribes were forced to move to reservations west of the Mississippi River, most famously the Cherokee whose relocation was called the "Trail of Tears".

=== American Revolutionary War (1775–1783) ===
The American Revolutionary War had distinct eastern and western theaters. While the conflict in the east centered on the struggle between the British Thirteen Colonies and Great Britain, the war in the trans-Appalachian West involved contests among the United States, Great Britain, and numerous American Indian nations for control of territory east of the Mississippi River. Many Indian nations allied with the British, viewing them as a potential check on American settlement and westward expansion. Historian Colin G. Calloway has described the Revolutionary War as "the most extensive and destructive" Indian war in United States history.

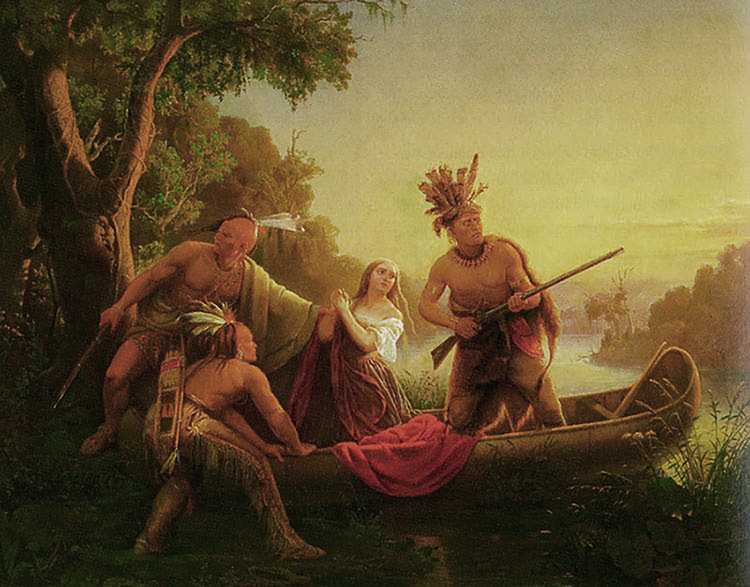
The abduction of Jemima Boone by Shawnee in 1776

Some American Indian tribes were divided over which side to support in the war, such as the Iroquois Confederacy based in New York and Pennsylvania who split: the Oneida and Tuscarora sided with the American Patriots, and the Mohawk, Seneca, Cayuga, and Onondaga sided with the British. The Iroquois tried to avoid fighting directly against one another, but the Revolution eventually forced intra-Iroquois combat, and both sides lost territory following the war. The Crown aided the landless Iroquois by rewarding them with a reservation at Grand River in Ontario and some other lands. In the Southeast, the Cherokee split into a pro-patriot faction versus a pro-British faction that the Americans referred to as the Chickamauga Cherokee; they were led by Dragging Canoe. Many other tribes were similarly divided.

When the British made peace with the Americans in the 1783 Treaty of Paris, they ceded a vast amount of Indian territory to the United States. American Indian tribes who had sided with the British and had fought against the Americans were enemy combatants, as far as the United States was concerned; they were a conquered people who had lost their land.

=== Cherokee–American wars ===
The frontier conflicts were almost non-stop, beginning with Cherokee involvement in the American Revolutionary War and continuing through late 1794. The so-called "Chickamauga Cherokee", later called "Lower Cherokee", were from the Overhill Towns and later from the Lower Towns, Valley Towns, and Middle Towns. They followed war leader Dragging Canoe southwest, first to the Chickamauga Creek area near Chattanooga, Tennessee, then to the Five Lower Towns where they were joined by groups of Muskogee, white Tories, runaway slaves, and renegade Chickasaw, as well as by more than a hundred Shawnee. The primary targets of attack were the Washington District colonies along the Watauga, Holston, and Nolichucky Rivers, and in Carter's Valley in upper eastern Tennessee, as well as the settlements along the Cumberland River beginning with Fort Nashborough in 1780, even into Kentucky, plus against the Franklin settlements, and later states of Virginia, North Carolina, South Carolina, and Georgia. The scope of attacks by the Chickamauga and their allies ranged from quick raids by small war parties to large campaigns by four or five hundred warriors, and once more than a thousand. The Upper Muskogee under Dragging Canoe's close ally Alexander McGillivray frequently joined their campaigns and also operated separately, and the settlements on the Cumberland came under attack from the Chickasaw, Shawnee from the north, and Delaware. Campaigns by Dragging Canoe and his successor John Watts were frequently conducted in conjunction with campaigns in the Northwest Territory. The colonists generally responded with attacks in which Cherokee settlements were completely destroyed, though usually without great loss of life on either side. The wars continued until the Treaty of Tellico Blockhouse in November 1794.

=== Northwest Indian War ===
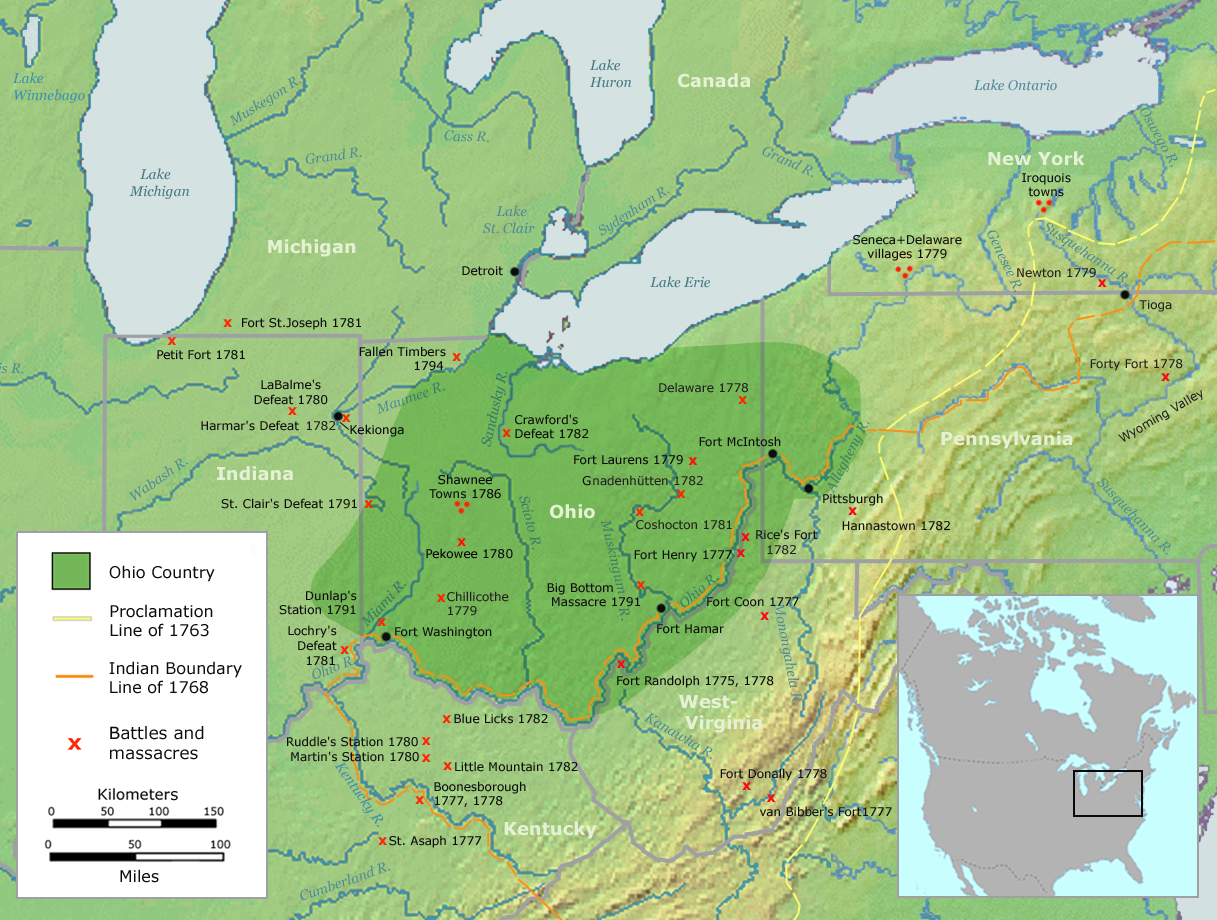
The Ohio Country with battles and massacres between 1775 and 1794

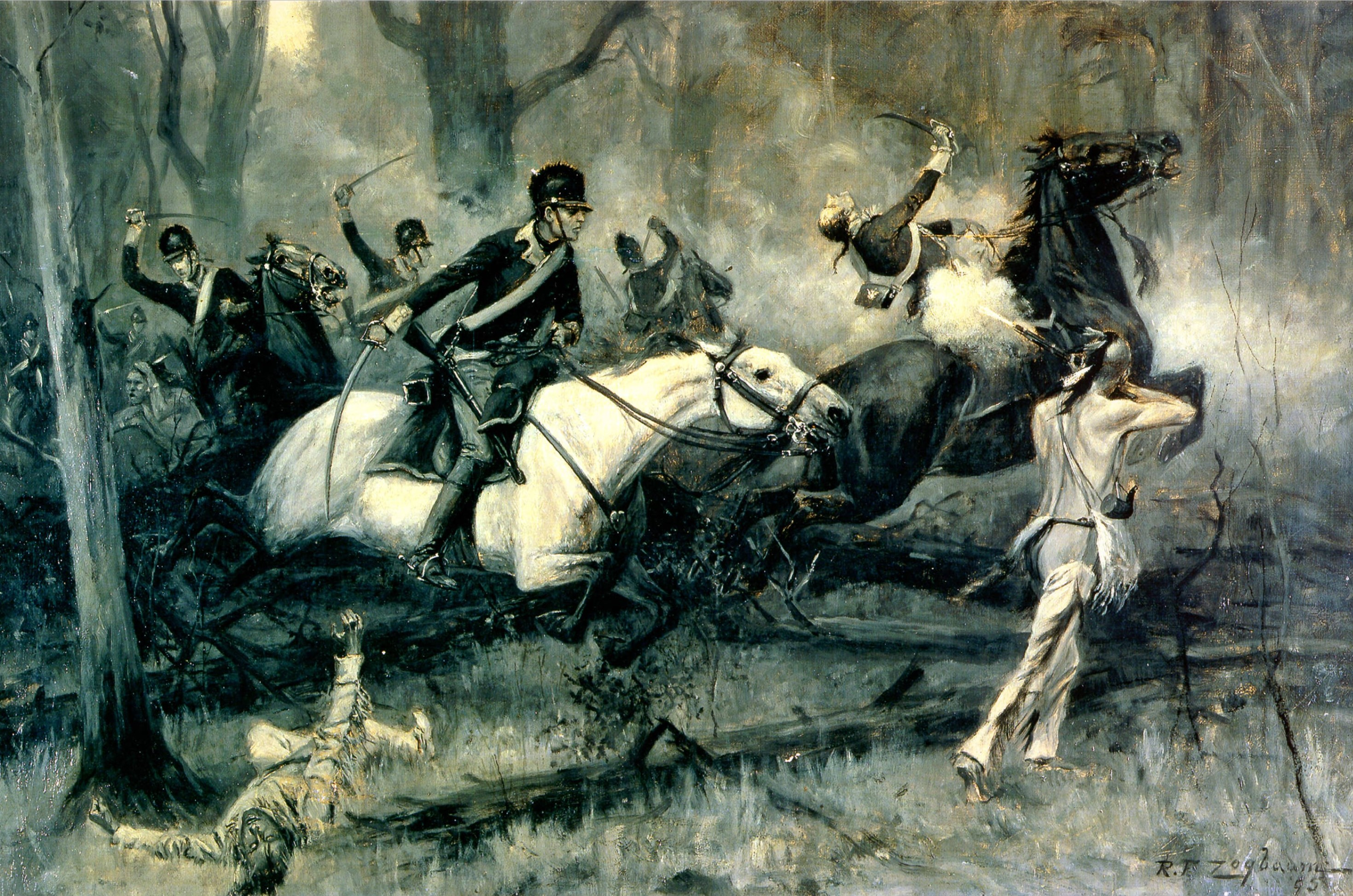
The Battle of Fallen Timbers

In 1787, the Northwest Ordinance officially organized the Northwest Territory for settlement, and American settlers began pouring into the region. Violence erupted as American Indian tribes resisted, and so the administration of President George Washington sent armed expeditions into the area. However, in the Northwest Indian War, a pan-tribal confederacy led by Blue Jacket (Shawnee), Little Turtle (Miami), Buckongahelas (Lenape), and Egushawa (Ottawa) defeated armies led by Generals Josiah Harmar and Arthur St. Clair. General St. Clair's defeat was the most severe loss ever inflicted upon an American army by American Indians. Following the successive defeats, the United States sent delegates to discuss peace with the Northwestern Confederacy, but the two sides could not agree on a boundary line. The United States dispatched a new expedition led by General Anthony Wayne, which defeated the confederacy at the 1794 Battle of Fallen Timbers. Realizing that British assistance was not forthcoming, the native nations were compelled to sign the Treaty of Greenville in 1795, which ceded Ohio and part of Indiana to the United States.

=== Tecumseh, the Creek War, and the War of 1812 ===
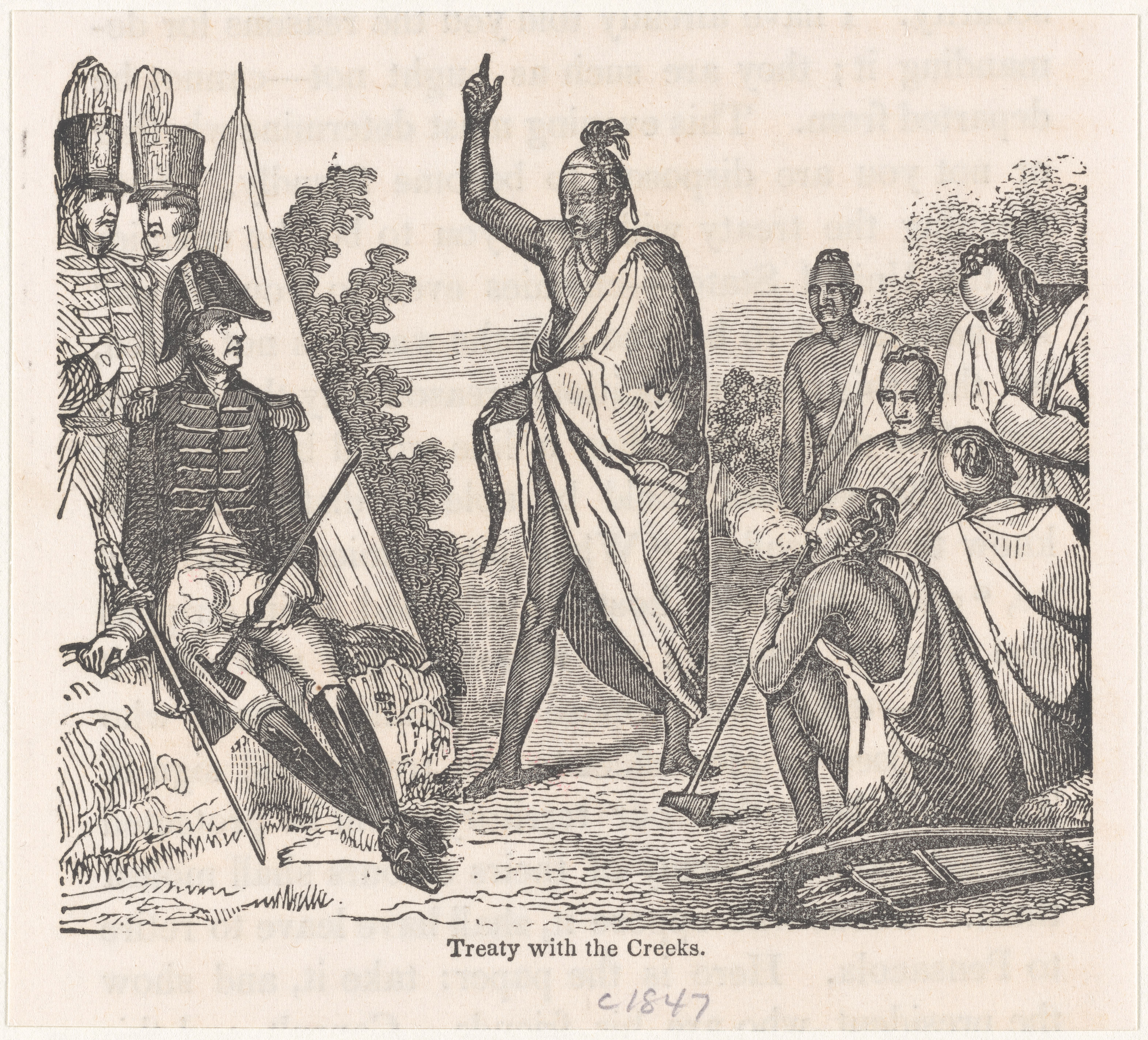
Treaty of Fort Jackson with the Creeks, 1814

By 1800, the American Indian population was approximately 600,000 in what would become the contiguous United States. By 1890, their population had declined to about 250,000. In 1800, William Henry Harrison became governor of the Indiana Territory, under the direction of President Thomas Jefferson, and he pursued an aggressive policy of obtaining titles to American Indian lands. Shawnee brothers Tecumseh and Tenskwatawa organized Tecumseh's War, another pan-tribal resistance to westward settlement.

Tecumseh was in the South attempting to recruit allies among the Creeks, Cherokees, and Choctaws when Harrison marched against the Indigenou confederacy, defeating Tenskwatawa and his followers at the Battle of Tippecanoe in 1811. The Americans hoped that the victory would end the militant resistance, but Tecumseh instead chose to ally openly with the British, who were soon at war with the Americans in the War of 1812. The Creek War (1813–1814) began as a tribal conflict within the Creek tribe, but it became part of the larger struggle against American expansion. Tecumseh was killed by Harrison's army at the Battle of the Thames, ending the resistance in the Old Northwest. The First Seminole War in 1818 resulted in the transfer of Florida from Spain to the United States in 1819.

=== Second Seminole War ===
American settlers began to push into Florida, which was now an American territory and had some of the most fertile lands in the nation. Paul Hoffman claims that covetousness, racism, and "self-defense" against American Indian raids played a major part in the settlers' determination to "rid Florida of Indians once and for all". To compound the tension, runaway black slaves sometimes found refuge in Seminole camps. The result was clashes between white settlers and the American Indians residing there. Andrew Jackson sought to alleviate this problem by signing the Indian Removal Act in 1830, which stipulated the relocation of American Indians out of Florida – by force if necessary. Many Seminole groups were relatively new arrivals in Florida, led by such powerful leaders as Aripeka (Sam Jones), Micanopy, and Osceola, and they had no intention of leaving their lands. They retaliated against the settlers, and this led to the Second Seminole War, the longest and most costly war that the Army ever waged against American Indians.

In May 1830, the Indian Removal Act was passed by Congress which stipulated forced removal of Americans Indians in the Southeast to Oklahoma. The Treaty of Paynes Landing was signed in May 1832 by a few Seminole chiefs who later recanted, claiming that they were tricked or forced to sign and making it clear that they would not consent to relocating to a reservation out west. The Seminoles' continued resistance to relocation led Florida to prepare for war. The St. Augustine Militia asked the US War Department for the loan of 500 muskets, and 500 volunteers were mobilized under Brig. Gen. Richard K. Call. Indian war parties raided farms and settlements, and families fled to forts or large towns, or out of the territory altogether. A war party led by Osceola captured a Florida militia supply train, killing eight of its guards and wounding six others; most of the goods taken were recovered by the militia in another fight a few days later. Sugar plantations were destroyed along the Atlantic coast south of St. Augustine, Florida, with many of the slaves on the plantations joining the Seminoles.

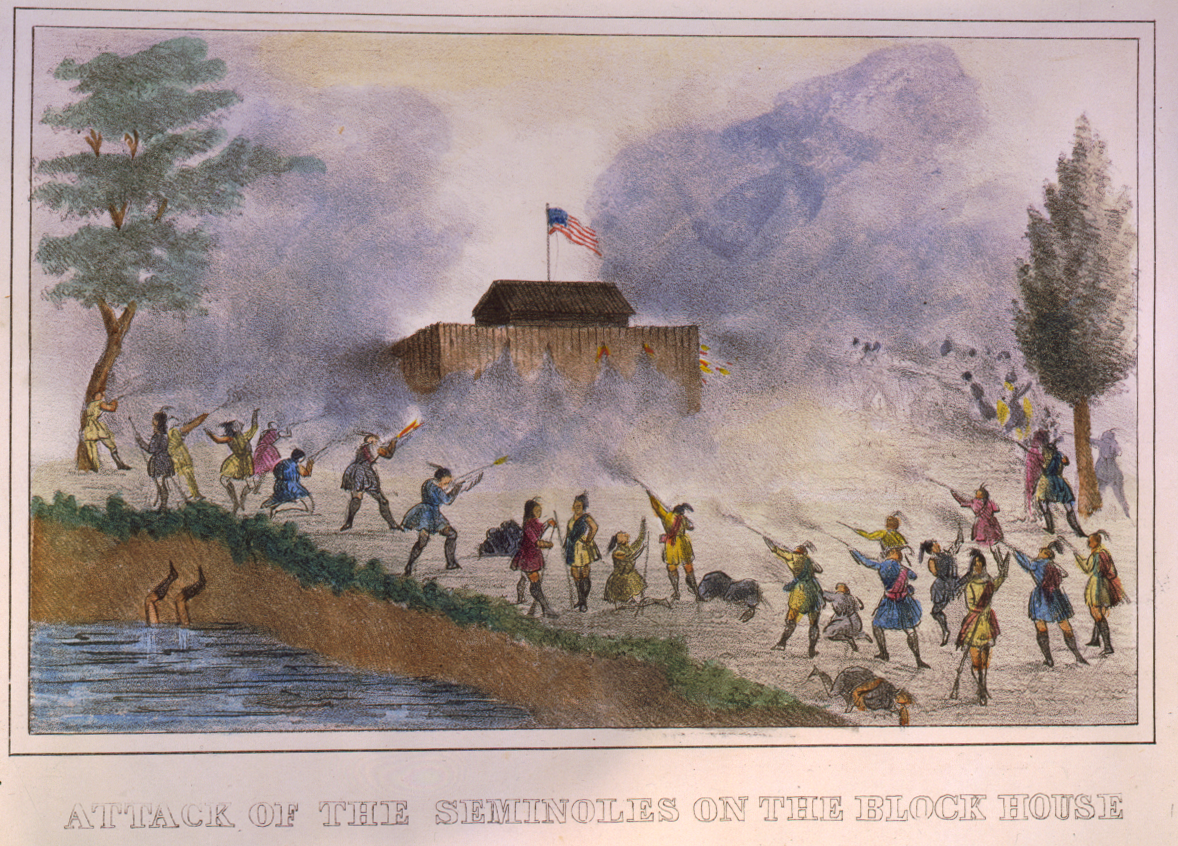
Attack of the Seminoles on the blockhouse in December 1835

The US Army had 11 companies (about 550 soldiers) stationed in Florida. Fort King had only one company of soldiers, and it was feared that they might be overrun by the Seminoles. Three companies were stationed at Fort Brooke, with another two expected imminently, so the army decided to send two companies to Fort King. On December 23, 1835, the two companies totaling 110 men left Fort Brooke under the command of Major Francis L. Dade. Seminoles shadowed the marching soldiers for five days, and they ambushed them and wiped out the command on December 28. Only three men survived, and one was hunted down and killed by a Seminole the next day. Survivors Ransome Clarke and Joseph Sprague returned to Fort Brooke. Clarke died of his wounds later, and he provided the only account of the battle from the army's perspective. The Seminoles lost three men and five wounded. On the same day as the massacre, Osceola and his followers shot and killed Agent Wiley Thompson and six others during an ambush outside of Fort King.

On December 29, General Clinch left Fort Drane with 750 soldiers, including 500 volunteers on an enlistment due to end January 1, 1836. The group was traveling to a Seminole stronghold called the Cove of the Withlacoochee, an area of many lakes on the southwest side of the Withlacoochee River. When they reached the river, the soldiers could not find the ford, so Clinch ferried his regular troops across the river in a single canoe. Once they were across and had relaxed, the Seminoles attacked. The troops fixed bayonets and charged them, at the cost of four dead and 59 wounded. The militia provided cover as the army troops then withdrew across the river.

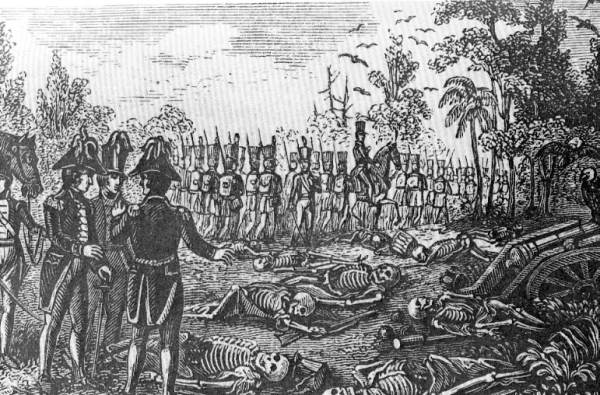
The Dade battle was the US Army's worst defeat at the hands of Seminoles

In the Battle of Lake Okeechobee, Colonel Zachary Taylor saw the first major action of the campaign. He left Fort Gardiner on the upper Kissimmee River with 1,000 men on December 19 and headed towards Lake Okeechobee. In the first two days, 90 Seminoles surrendered. On the third day, Taylor stopped to build Fort Basinger where he left his sick and enough men to guard the Seminoles who had surrendered. Taylor's column caught up with the main body of the Seminoles on the north shore of Lake Okeechobee on December 25.

The Seminoles were led by "Alligator", Sam Jones, and the recently escaped Coacoochee, and they were positioned in a hammock surrounded by sawgrass. The ground was thick mud, and sawgrass easily cuts and burns the skin. Taylor had about 800 men, while the Seminoles numbered fewer than 400. Taylor sent in the Missouri volunteers first, moving his troops squarely into the center of the swamp. His plan was to make a direct attack rather than encircle the Native Americans. All his men were on foot. As soon as they came within range, the American Indians opened with heavy fire. The volunteers broke and their commander Colonel Gentry was fatally wounded, so they retreated back across the swamp. The fighting in the sawgrass was deadliest for five companies of the Sixth Infantry; every officer but one was killed or wounded, along with most of their non-commissioned officers. The soldiers suffered 26 killed and 112 wounded, compared to 11 Seminoles killed and 14 wounded. No Seminoles were captured, although Taylor did capture 100 ponies and 600 head of cattle.

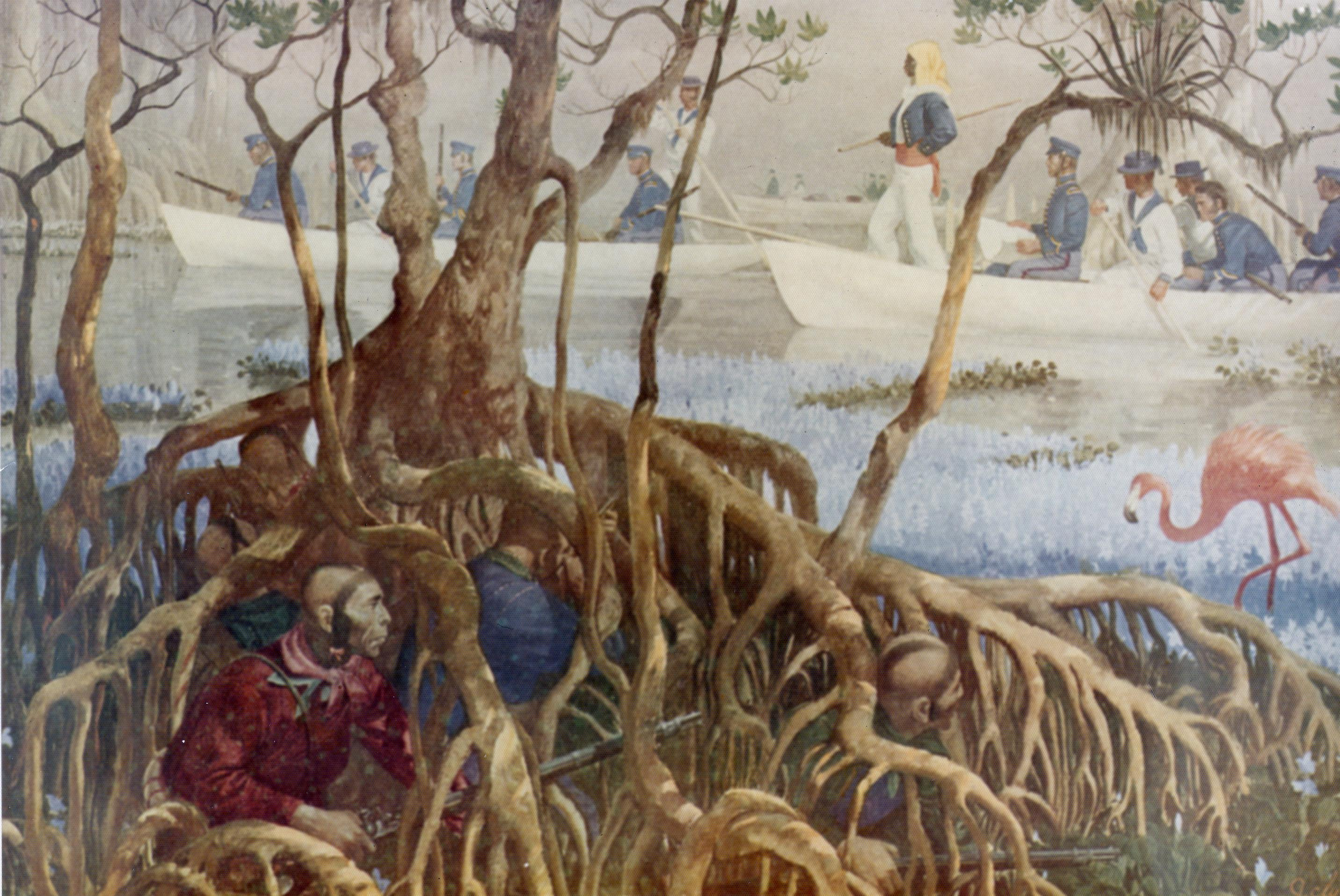
Marines searching for the Seminoles among the mangroves

By 1842, the war was winding down and most Seminoles had left Florida for Oklahoma. The US Army officially recorded 1,466 deaths in the Second Seminole War, mostly from disease. The number killed in action is less clear. Mahon reports 328 regular army killed in action, while Missall reports that Seminoles killed 269 officers and men. Almost half of those deaths occurred in the Dade battle, Battle of Lake Okeechobee, and Harney Massacre. Similarly, Mahon reports 69 deaths for the Navy, while Missal reports 41 for the Navy and Marine Corps. Mahon and the Florida Board of State Institutions agree that 55 volunteer officers and men were killed by the Seminoles, while Missall says that the number is unknown. A northern newspaper carried a report that more than 80 civilians were killed by Indians in Florida in 1839. By the end of 1843, 3,824 American Indians had been shipped from Florida to the Indian Territory.

== West of the Mississippi (1804–1924) ==
The series of conflicts in the western United States between American Indians, American settlers, and their United States Government Allies, are generally known as the Indian Wars. Many of these conflicts occurred during and after the Civil War until the closing of the frontier in about 1890. However, regions of the West that were settled before the Civil War saw significant conflicts prior to 1860, such as Texas, New Mexico, Utah, Oregon, California, and Washington state.

Various statistics have been developed concerning the devastation of these wars on the peoples involved. Gregory Michno used records dealing with figures "as a direct result of" engagements and concluded that "of the 21,586 total casualties tabulated in this survey, military personnel and civilians accounted for 6,596 (31%), while Native American casualties totaled about 14,990 (69%)" for the period of 1850–90. However, Michno says that he "used the army's estimates in almost every case" and "the number of casualties in this study are inherently biased toward army estimations". His work includes almost nothing on "Indian war parties", and he states that "army records are often incomplete".

According to Michno, more conflicts with American Indians occurred in the states bordering Mexico than in the interior states. Arizona ranked highest, with 310 known battles fought within the state's boundaries between Americans and American Indians. Also, Arizona ranked highest of the states in deaths from the wars. At least 4,340 people were killed, including both the settlers and the American Indians, over twice as many as occurred in Texas, the second highest-ranking state. Michno also says that 51 percent of the battles took place in Arizona, Texas, and New Mexico between 1850 and 1890, as well as 37 percent of the casualties in the country west of the Mississippi River.

=== Background ===
American settlers and fur trappers had spread into the western United States territories and had established the Santa Fe Trail and the Oregon Trail. Relations were generally peaceful between American settlers and American Indians. The Bents of Bent's Fort on the Santa Fe Trail had friendly relations with the Cheyenne and Arapaho, and peace was established on the Oregon Trail by the Treaty of Fort Laramie signed in 1851 between the United States and the Plains Indians and the Indigenous peoples of the northern Rocky Mountains. The treaty allowed passage by settlers, building roads, and stationing troops along the Oregon Trail.

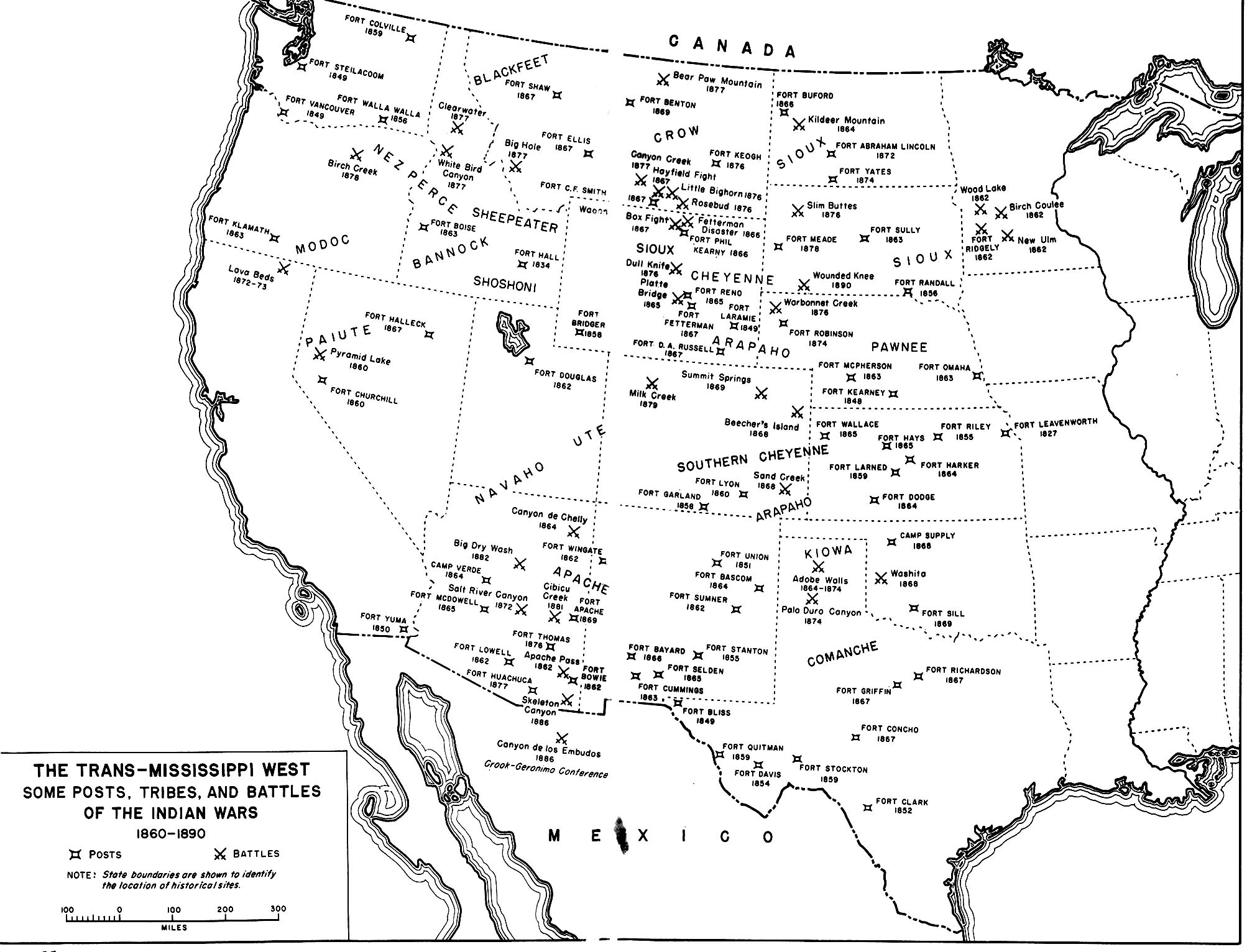
Battles, army posts, and the general location of tribes in the American West

The Pike's Peak Gold Rush of 1859 introduced a substantial white population into the Front Range of the Rockies, supported by a trading lifeline that crossed the central Great Plains. Advancing settlement following the passage of the Homestead Act of 1862 and the growing transcontinental railways following the Civil War further destabilized the situation, placing white settlers into direct competition for the land and resources of the Great Plains and the Rocky Mountain West. Additional factors included discovery of gold in Montana during the Montana Gold Rush of 1862–1863 and the opening of the Bozeman Trail, which led to Red Cloud's War, and later discovery of gold in the Black Hills resulting in the gold rush of 1875–1878 and the Great Sioux War of 1876–77.

Miners, ranchers, and settlers expanded into the plain, Native American populations of the West. Many tribes fought American settlers at one time or another, from the Utes of the Great Basin to the Nez Perce tribe of Idaho. But the Sioux of the Northern Plains and the Apaches of the Southwest waged the most aggressive warfare, led by resolute, militant leaders such as Red Cloud and Crazy Horse. The Sioux were relatively new arrivals on the Plains, as they had been sedentary farmers in the Great Lakes region previously. They moved west, displacing American Indian tribes and becoming feared warriors. The Apaches supplemented their economy by raiding other tribes, and they practiced warfare to avenge the death of a kinsman.

During the American Civil War, Army units were withdrawn to fight the war in the east. They were replaced by the volunteer infantry and cavalry raised by the states of California and Oregon, by the western territorial governments, or by the local militias. These units fought the American Indians and kept open communications with the east, holding the west for the Union and defeating the Confederate attempt to capture the New Mexico Territory. After 1865, national policy called for all "Indians" either to assimilate into the American population as citizens, or to live peacefully on Indian reservations. Raids and wars between tribes were not allowed, and armed American Indian bands off a reservation were the responsibility of the Army to round up and return.

=== Texas ===
The 18th and early 19th centuries in Texas were characterized by competition and warfare between the Comanches in the north and west of the state and Spanish settlements in the south and east. In the Battle of the Twin Villages in 1759, the Comanche and their Wichita allies defeated a Spanish and Apache army of more than 500 men and halted Spanish expansion in Texas. Comanche raids on Spanish settlements and their Lipan Apache allies in Texas and a defensive Spanish posture characterized the next 70 years. In the 1830s large numbers of Americans began to settle in Texas and they encroached on Comancheria, the proto-empire of the Comanches. A series of battles between Americans and Comanche Indians and their Kiowa and Kiowa Apache allies continued until the 1870s.

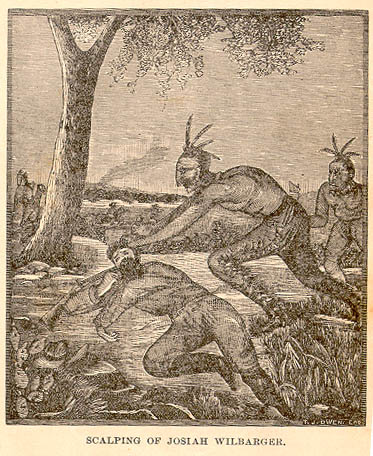
Josiah P. Wilbarger being scalped by Comanches, 1833

The first notable battle between American settlers and Comanche was the Fort Parker massacre in 1836, in which a war party of Comanches, Kiowas, Wichitas, and Delawares attacked the Texan outpost at Fort Parker. A small number of settlers were killed during the raid, and the abduction of Cynthia Ann Parker and two other children caused widespread outrage among Texans.

The Republic of Texas gained independence from Mexico in 1836. The Texas government under President Sam Houston pursued a policy of engagement with the Comanches and Kiowas. Houston had lived with the Cherokees, but the Cherokees joined with Mexican forces to fight against Texas. Houston resolved the conflict without resorting to arms, refusing to believe that the Cherokees would take up arms against his government. The administration of Mirabeau B. Lamar followed Houston's and took a very different policy towards Native Americans. Lamar removed the Cherokees to the west and then sought to deport the Comanches and Kiowas. This led to a series of battles, including the Council House Fight, in which the Texas militia killed 33 Comanche chiefs at a peace parley. The Comanches retaliated with the Great Raid of 1840, and the Battle of Plum Creek followed several days later.

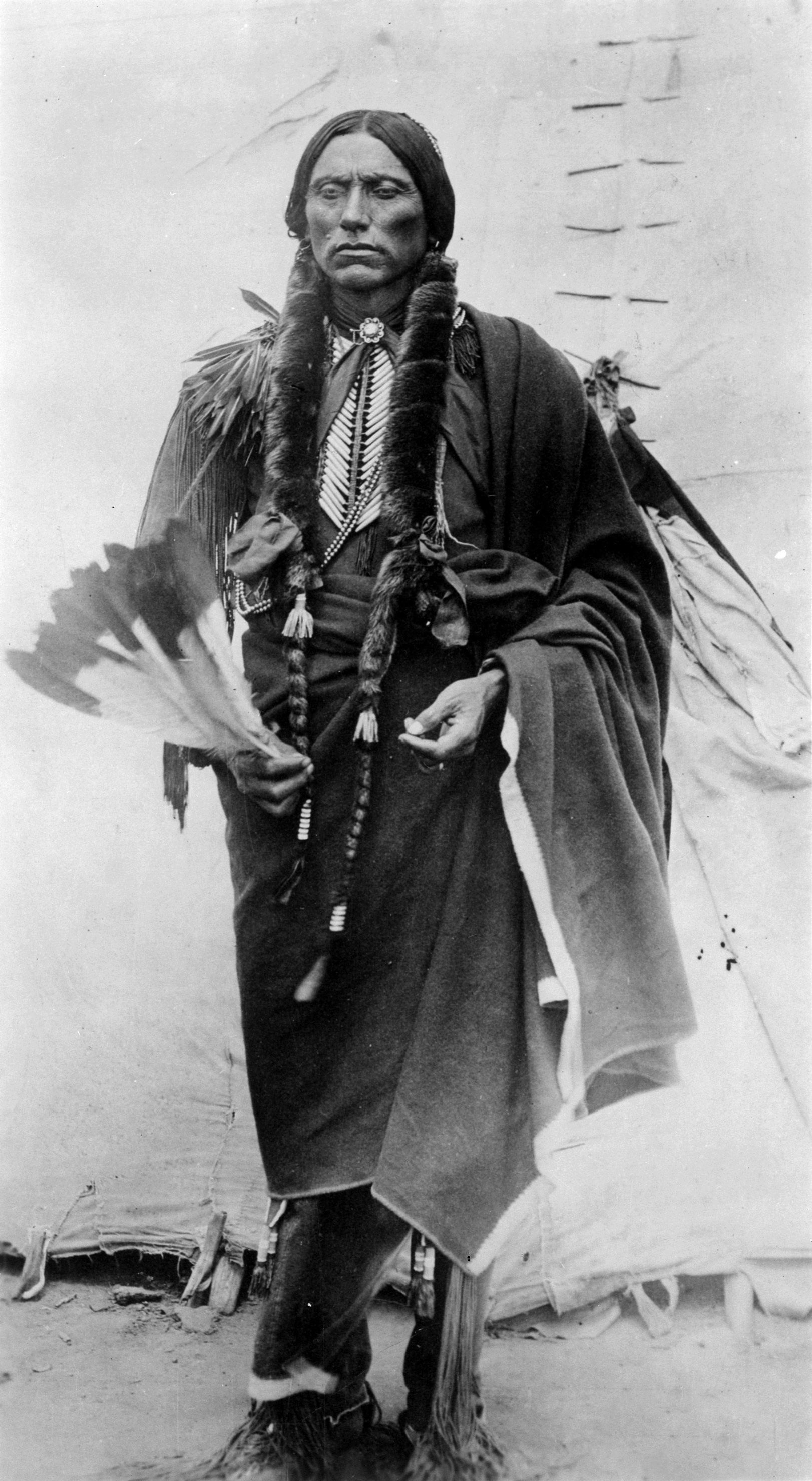
Quanah Parker, son of a Comanche Chief and an abducted Texas settler; his family's story spans the history of the Texas–Indian wars

The Lamar Administration was known for its failed and expensive Indian policy; the cost of the war with the American Indians exceeded the annual revenue of the government throughout his four-year term. It was followed by a second Houston administration, which resumed the previous policy of diplomacy. Texas signed treaties with all of the tribes, including the Comanches. In the 1840s and 1850s, the Comanches and their allies shifted most of their raiding to a weak and newly independent Mexico. Comanche armies numbering in the hundreds raided deep into Mexico for horses and captives and used Texas as a safe haven from Mexican retaliation (see Comanche–Mexico Wars).

Texas joined the Union in 1845, and the Federal government and Texas took up the struggle between the Plains Indians and the settlers. The conflicts were particularly vicious and bloody on the Texas frontier in 1856 through 1858, as settlers continued to expand their settlements into Comancheria. The first Texan incursion into the heart of the Comancheria was in 1858, the so-called Antelope Hills Expedition marked by the Battle of Little Robe Creek.

The battles between American settlers and American Indians continued in 1860, and Texas militia destroyed an American Indian camp at the Battle of Pease River. In the aftermath of the battle, the Texans learned that they had recaptured Cynthia Ann Parker, the little girl captured by the Comanches in 1836. She returned to live with her family, but she missed her children, including her son Quanah Parker. He was the son of Parker and Comanche Chief Peta Nocona, and he became a Comanche war chief at the Second Battle of Adobe Walls. He ultimately surrendered to the overwhelming force of the federal government and moved to a reservation in southwestern Oklahoma in 1875.

=== Pacific Northwest ===
On 1–4 October 1804, Russian America (now the state of Alaska) had suppressed a revolt by the Tlingit Kiks.ádi Clan during the battle of Sitka.

A number of wars occurred in the wake of the Oregon Treaty of 1846 and the creation of Oregon Territory and Washington Territory. Among the causes of conflict were a sudden immigration to the region and a series of gold rushes throughout the Pacific Northwest. The Whitman massacre of 1847 triggered the Cayuse War, which led to fighting from the Cascade Range to the Rocky Mountains. The Cayuse were defeated in 1855, but the conflict had expanded and continued in what became known as the Yakama War (1855–1858). Washington Territory Governor Isaac Stevens tried to compel Native American tribes to sign treaties ceding land and establishing reservations. The Yakama signed one of the treaties negotiated during the Walla Walla Council of 1855, establishing the Yakama Indian Reservation, but Stevens' attempts served mainly to intensify hostilities. Gold discoveries near Fort Colville resulted in many miners crossing Yakama lands via Naches Pass, and conflicts rapidly escalated into violence. It took several years for the Army to defeat the Yakama, during which time war spread to the Puget Sound region west of the Cascades. The Puget Sound War of 1855–1856 was triggered in part by the Yakama War and in part by the use of intimidation to compel tribes to sign land cession treaties. The Treaty of Medicine Creek of 1854 established an unrealistically small reservation on poor land for the Nisqually and Puyallup tribes. Violence broke out in the White River valley, along the route to Naches Pass and connecting Nisqually and Yakama lands. The Puget Sound War is often remembered in connection with the Battle of Seattle (1856) and the execution of Nisqually Chief Leschi, a central figure of the war.

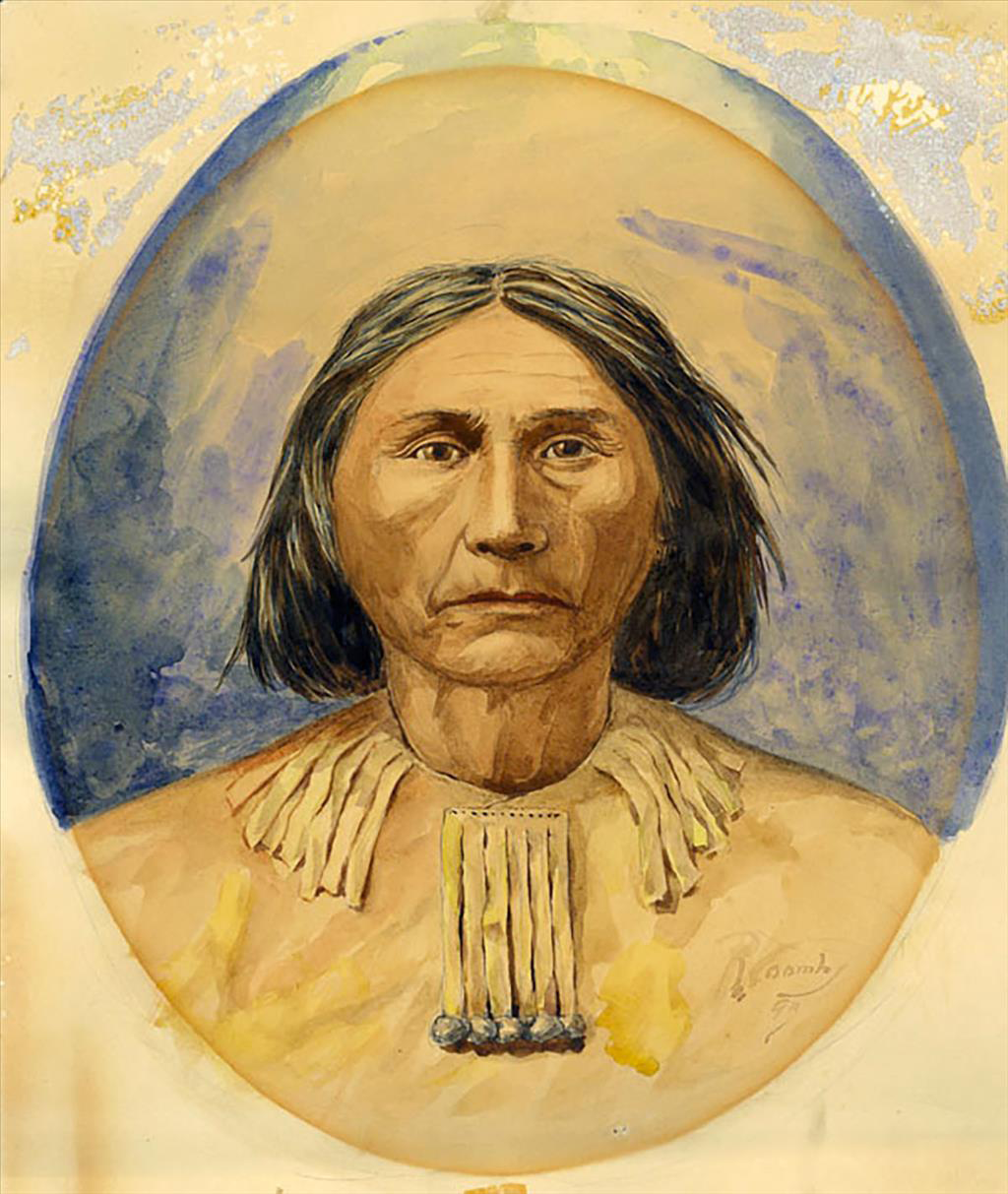
Nisqually Chief Leschi was hanged for murder in 1858. He was exonerated by Washington State in 2004.

In 1858, the fighting spread on the east side of the Cascades. This second phase of the Yakama War is known as the Coeur d'Alene War. The Yakama, Palouse, Spokane, and Coeur d'Alene tribes were defeated at the Battle of Four Lakes in late 1858.

In southwest Oregon, tensions and skirmishes escalated between American settlers and the Rogue River peoples into the Rogue River Wars of 1855–1856. The California Gold Rush helped fuel a large increase in the number of people traveling south through the Rogue River Valley. Gold discoveries continued to trigger violent conflict between prospectors and Indians. Beginning in 1858, the Fraser Canyon Gold Rush in British Columbia drew large numbers of miners, many from Washington, Oregon, and California, culminating in the Fraser Canyon War. This conflict occurred in the Colony of British Columbia, but the militias involved were formed mostly of Americans.

Shortly after the Fraser Canyon War the American Indian peoples of the Pacific Northwest Coast, including areas that are now part of the United States and Canada, from Washington to Alaska, suffered major population loss, cultural devastation, and loss of sovereignty due to the 1862 Pacific Northwest smallpox epidemic. The Chilcotin War of 1864 occurred near the end of the epidemic when a road from the gold fields to the coast was being built through Tsilhqotʼin territory without permission. At the time, and still today, First Nations such as the Tsilhqotʼin say the colonial government deliberately spread smallpox with the aim of ending Indian sovereignty and Indian rights in British Columbia. Workers on the road-building project threatened the Tsilhqotʼin with smallpox. The war ended with the hanging of six Tsilhqotʼin chiefs. In 2014, British Columbia Premier Christy Clark formally exonerated the executed chiefs and apologized for these acts, acknowledging that "there is an indication [that smallpox] was spread intentionally." The discovery of gold in Idaho and Oregon in the 1860s led to similar conflicts which culminated in the Bear River Massacre in 1863 and Snake War from 1864 to 1868.

In the late 1870s, another series of armed conflicts occurred in Oregon and Idaho, spreading east into Wyoming and Montana. The Nez Perce War of 1877 is known particularly for Chief Joseph and the four-month, 1,200-mile fighting retreat of a band of about 800 Nez Perce, including women and children. The Nez Perce War was caused by a large influx of American settlers, the appropriation of American Indian lands, and a gold rush—this time in Idaho. The Nez Perce engaged 2,000 American soldiers of different military units, as well as their American Indian auxiliaries. They fought "eighteen engagements, including four major battles and at least four fiercely contested skirmishes", according to Alvin Josephy. Chief Joseph and the Nez Perce were much admired for their conduct in the war and their fighting ability.

The Bannock War broke out the following year for similar reasons. The Sheepeater Indian War in 1879 was the last conflict in the area.

=== Southwest ===
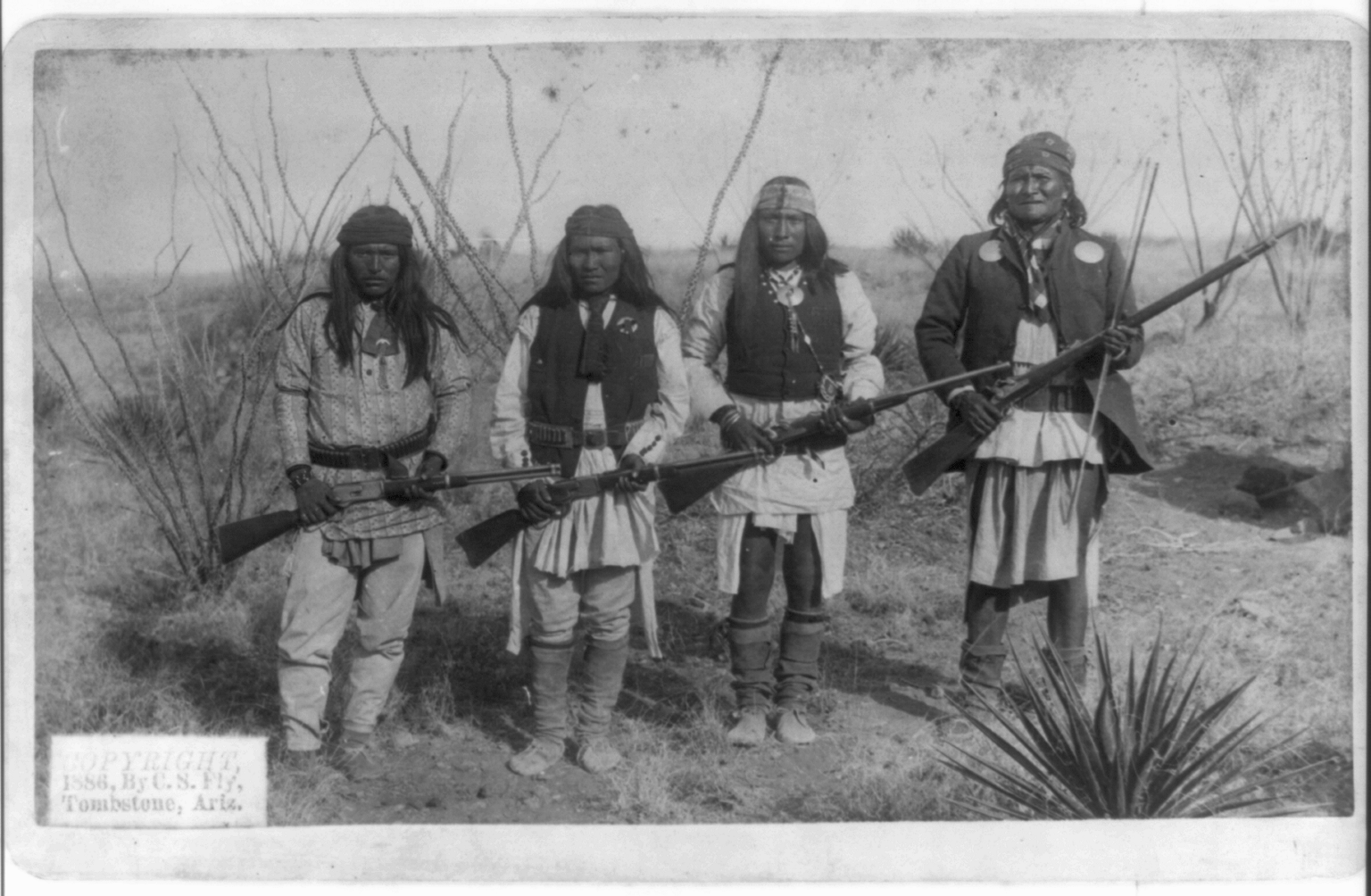
Geronimo (right) and his warriors in 1886

Various wars between Spanish Colonists and American Indians, mainly Comanches and Apaches, took place from the 17th to the 19th century in the Southwest United States. Spanish governors made peace treaties with some tribes during this period. Several events stand out during the colonial period: On the one hand, the administration of Tomás Vélez Cachupín, the only colonial governor of New Mexico who managed to establish peace with the Comanches after having confronted them in the Battle of San Diego Pond, and learned how to relate to them without giving rise to misunderstandings that could lead to conflict with them. The Pueblo Revolt of 1680 was also highlighted, causing the Spanish province to be divided into two areas: one led by the Spanish governor and the other by the leader of the Pueblos. Several military conflicts happened between Spaniards and Pueblos in this period until Diego de Vargas made a peace treaty with them in 1691, which made them subjects of the Spanish governor again. Conflicts between Europeans and indigenous peoples continued following the acquisition of Alta California and Santa Fe de Nuevo México from Mexico at the end of the Mexican–American War in 1848, and the Gadsden Purchase in 1853. The first conflicts were in the New Mexico Territory, and later in California and the Utah Territory during and after the California Gold Rush.

American Indian tribes in the southwest had been engaged in cycles of trading and fighting with one another and with settlers for centuries prior to the United States gaining control of the region. These conflicts with the United States involved every non-pueblo tribe in the region and often were a continuation of Mexican–Spanish conflicts. The Navajo Wars and Apache Wars are perhaps the best known. The last major campaign of the military against American Indian tribes in the Southwest involved 5,000 troops in the field, and resulted in the surrender of Chiricahua Apache Geronimo and his band of 24 warriors, women, and children in 1886.

=== California ===
The U.S. Army kept a small garrison west of the Rockies, but starting in 1849, the California Gold Rush brought a great influx of miners and settlers into the area. The result was that most of the early conflicts with the California Indians involved local parties of American miners or settlers. During the American Civil War, California volunteers replaced Federal troops and won the ongoing Bald Hills War and the Owens Valley Indian War and engaged in minor actions in northern California. California and Oregon volunteer garrisons in Nevada, Oregon, Idaho, Utah, New Mexico, and the Arizona Territories also engaged in conflicts with the Apache, Cheyenne, Goshute, Navajo, Paiute, Shoshone, Sioux, and Ute Indians from 1862 to 1866. Following the Civil War, rebellion in California was mostly destroyed, but federal troops replaced the volunteers and fought the American Indians of the Mojave Desert, and in the northeast during the Snake War and Modoc War (1872–1873).

=== Great Basin ===
The tribes of the Great Basin were mostly Shoshone, and they were greatly affected by the Oregon and California Trails and by Mormon pioneers to Utah. The Shoshone had friendly relations with American and British fur traders and trappers, beginning with their encounter with Lewis and Clark.

The traditional way of life of the American Indians was disrupted, and they began raiding travelers along the trails and aggression toward Mormon settlers. During the American Civil War, the California Volunteers stationed in Utah responded to complaints, which resulted in the Bear River Massacre. Following the massacre, various Shoshone tribes signed a series of treaties exchanging promises of peace for small annuities and reservations. One of these was the Box Elder Treaty which identified a land claim made by the Northwestern Shoshone. The Supreme Court declared this claim to be non-binding in a 1945 ruling, but the Indian Claims Commission recognized it as binding in 1968. Descendants of the original group were compensated collectively at a rate of less than $0.50 per acre, minus legal fees.

Most of the local groups were decimated by the war and faced continuing loss of hunting and fishing land caused by the steadily growing population. Some moved to the Fort Hall Indian Reservation when it was created in 1868. Some of the Shoshone populated the Mormon-sanctioned community of Washakie, Utah. From 1864, California and Oregon Volunteers also engaged in the early campaigns of the Snake War in the Great Basin areas of California, Nevada, Oregon and Idaho. From 1866 the U.S. Army replaced the Volunteers in that war which General George Crook brought to an end in 1868 after a protracted campaign.

=== Great Plains ===
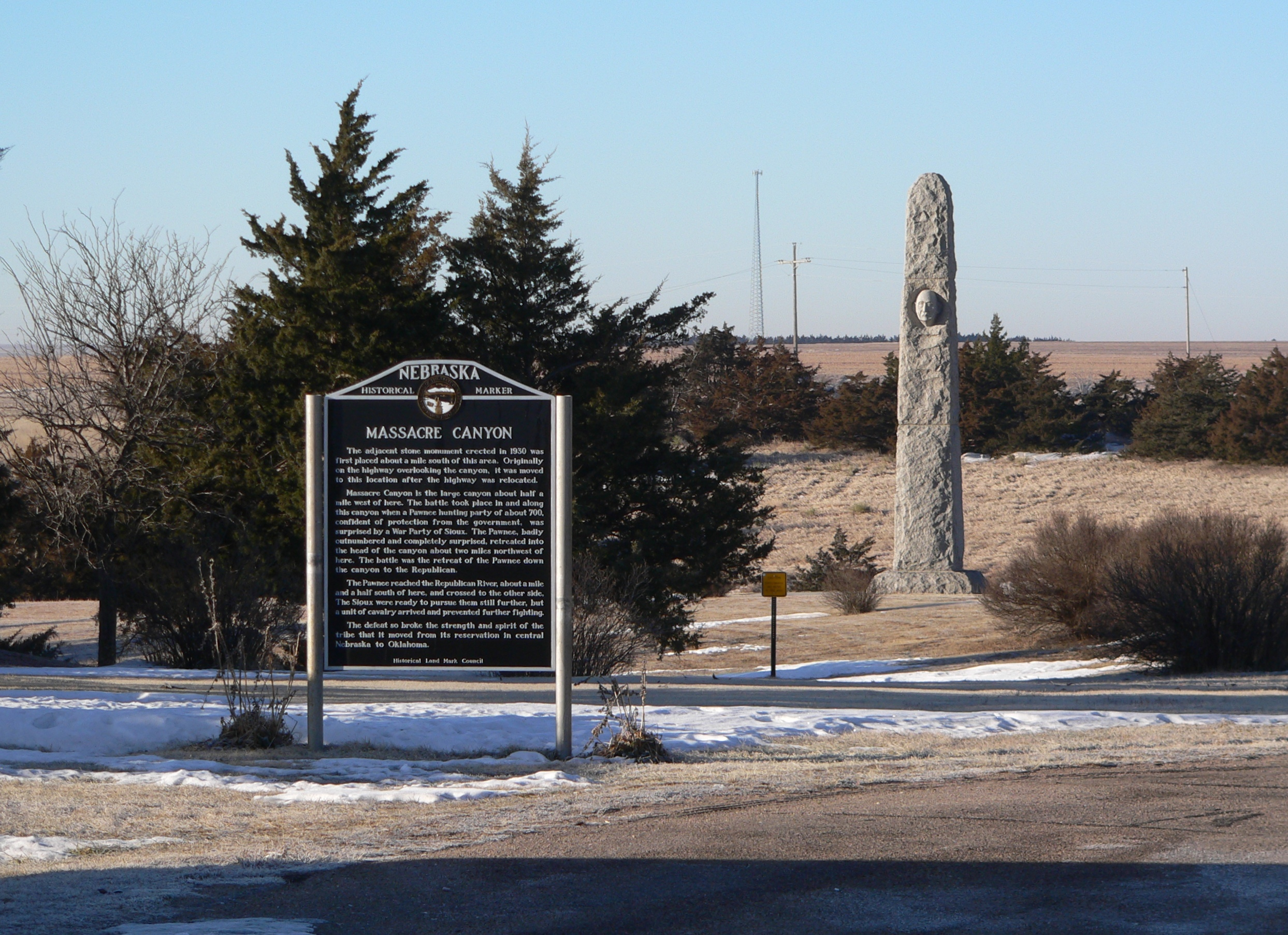
Massacre Canyon monument and historical marker in Nebraska

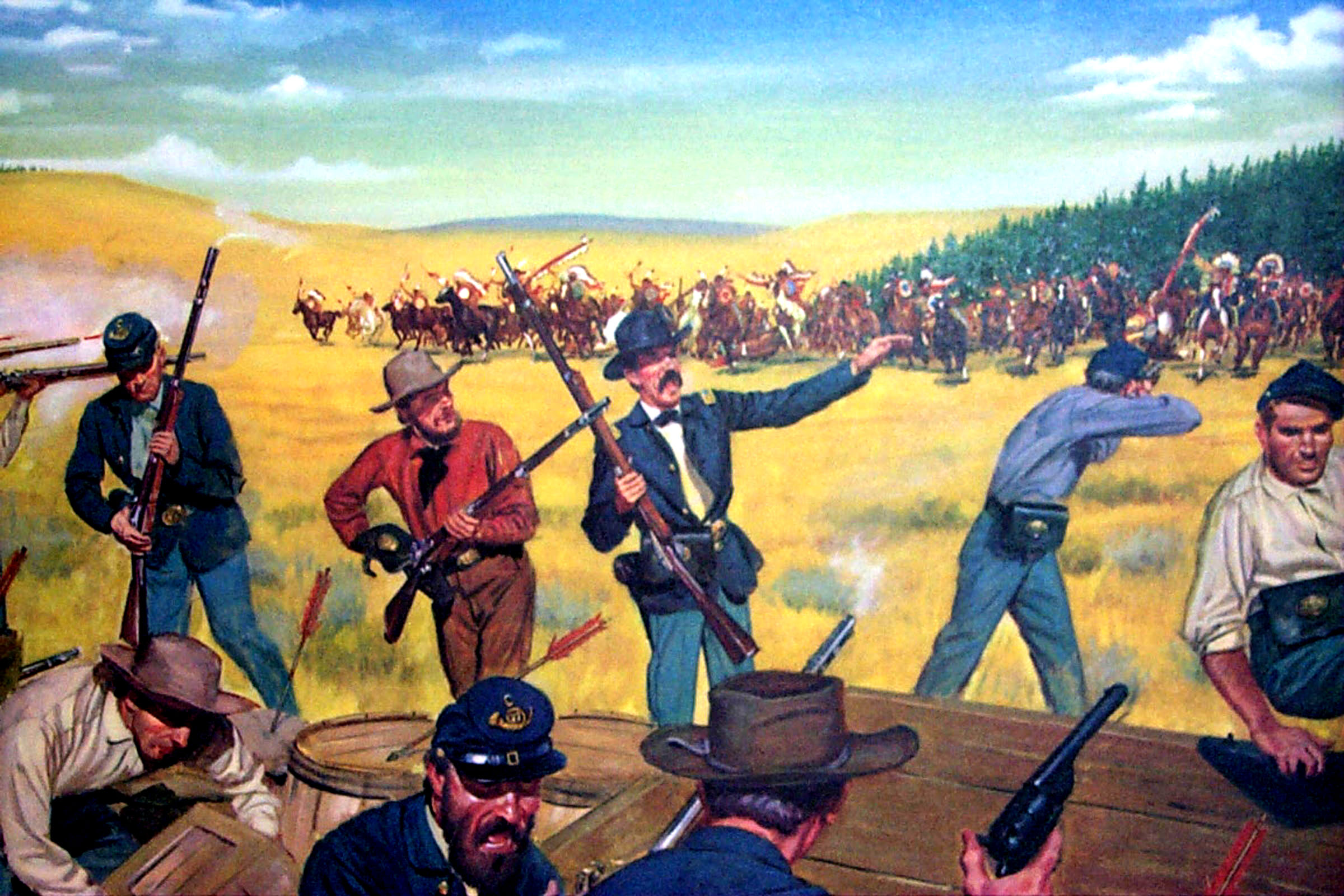
Wagon Box Fight, near Fort Phil Kearny, 1867

Initially relations between American participants in the Pike's Peak gold rush and the American Indian tribes of the Front Range and the Platte valley were friendly. An attempt was made to resolve conflicts by negotiation of the Treaty of Fort Wise, which established a reservation in southeastern Colorado, but the settlement was not agreed to by all of the roving warriors, particularly the Dog Soldiers. During the early 1860s tensions increased and culminated in the Colorado War and the Sand Creek Massacre, where Colorado volunteers fell on a peaceful Cheyenne village killing women and children, which set the stage for further conflict.

The cohabitative relationship between settlers and the Native American of the Colorado and Kansas plains was maintained by the tribes, but sentiment grew among the white Colorado settlers for Indian removal. The severity of the attacks on civilians during the Dakota War of 1862 contributed to these sentiments, as did the few minor incidents which occurred in the Platte Valley and in areas east of Denver. Regular army troops had been withdrawn for service in the Civil War and were replaced with the Colorado Volunteers, frontier-dwelling men who often favored extermination of the American Indians. They were commanded by John Chivington and George L. Shoup, who followed the lead of John Evans, territorial governor of Colorado. They adopted a policy of shooting on sight all Indians encountered, a policy which in short time ignited a general war on the Colorado and Kansas plains, the Colorado War.

Raids by bands of plains Indians on isolated homesteads to the east of Denver, on the advancing settlements in Kansas, on stage line stations along the South Platte, such as at Julesburg, and along the Smoky Hill Trail, resulted in many settlers in both Colorado and Kansas adopting a very hostile attitude towards Native Americans, with calls for extermination. Likewise, the violence shown by the Colorado Volunteers during the Sand Creek Massacre resulted in Native Americans, particularly the Dog Soldiers, a band of the Cheyenne, engaging in similarly violent retribution.

==== Dakota War ====
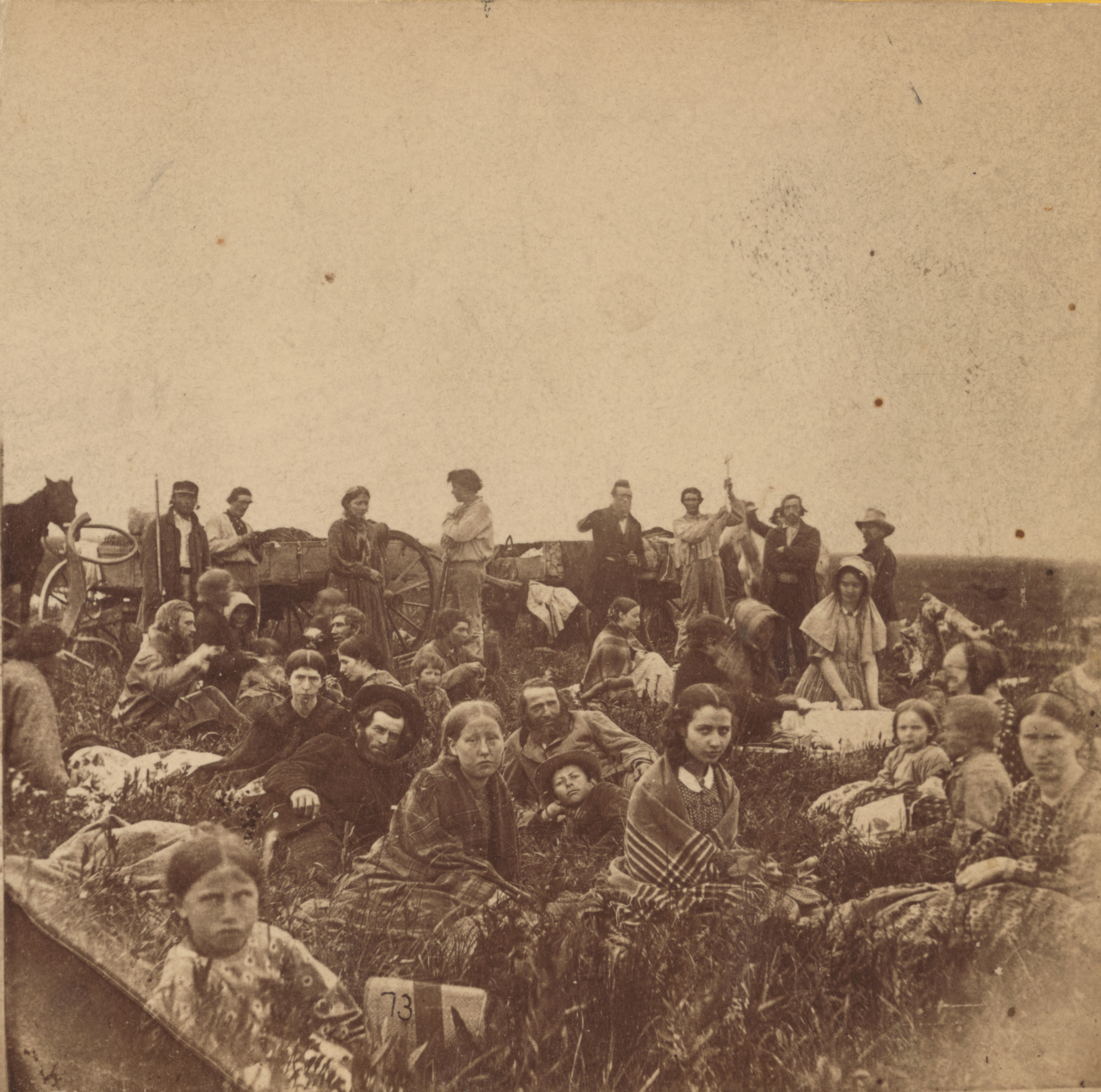
Settlers escaping the Dakota War of 1862

The Dakota War of 1862 (more commonly called the Sioux Uprising of 1862 in older authorities and popular texts) was the first major armed engagement between the U.S. and the Sioux. After six weeks of fighting in Minnesota, led mostly by Chief Taoyateduta (Little Crow), records conclusively show that more than 500 U.S. soldiers and settlers died in the conflict, though many more may have died in small raids or after being captured. The number of Sioux dead in the uprising is mostly undocumented. After the war, 303 Sioux warriors were convicted of murder and rape by U.S. military tribunals and sentenced to death. Most of the death sentences were commuted by President Lincoln, but on December 26, 1862, in Mankato, Minnesota, 38 Dakota Sioux men were hanged in what is still today the largest penal mass execution in U.S. history.

After the expulsion of the Dakota, some refugees and warriors made their way to Lakota lands in what is now North Dakota. Battles continued between Minnesota regiments and combined Lakota and Dakota forces through 1864, as Colonel Henry Sibley pursued the Sioux into Dakota Territory. Sibley's army defeated the Lakota and Dakota in three major battles in 1863: the Battle of Dead Buffalo Lake on July 26, 1863, the Battle of Stony Lake on July 28, 1863, and the Battle of Whitestone Hill on September 3, 1863. The Sioux retreated further, but again faced an American army in 1864; this time, Gen. Alfred Sully led a force from near Fort Pierre, South Dakota, and decisively defeated the Sioux at the Battle of Killdeer Mountain on July 28, 1864.

==== Colorado War, Sand Creek Massacre, and the Sioux War of 1865 ====
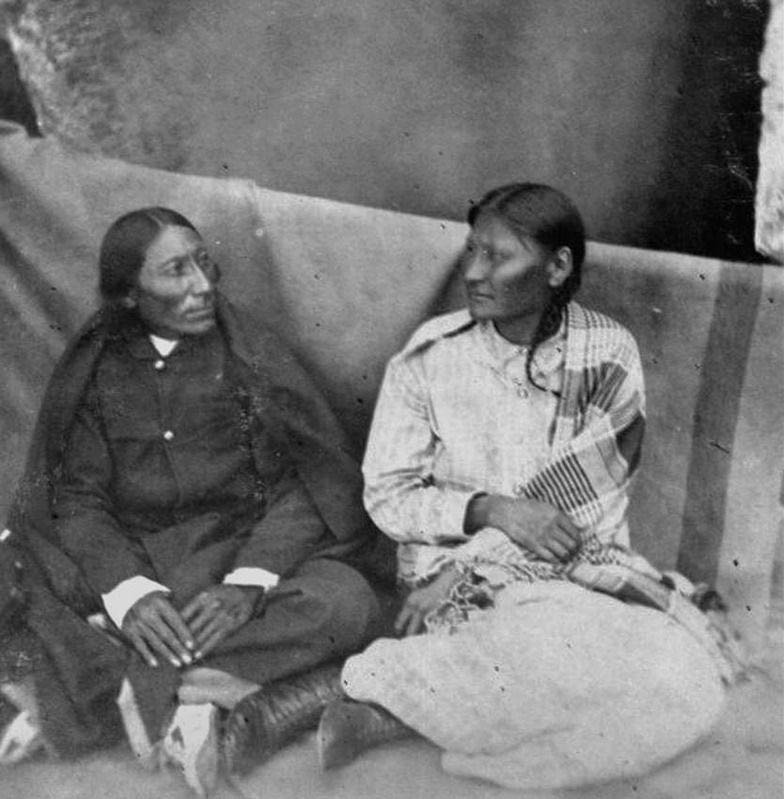
Mochi (right), a Southern Cheyenne in Black Kettle's camp, became a warrior after her experiences at the Sand Creek massacre

On November 29, 1864, the Colorado territory militia responded to a series of Native American attacks on white settlements by attacking a Cheyenne and Arapaho encampment on Sand Creek in southeastern Colorado, under orders to take no prisoners. The militia killed about 200 of the American Indians, two-thirds of whom were women and children, taking scalps and other grisly trophies.

Following the massacre, the survivors joined the camps of the Cheyenne on the Smokey Hill and Republican Rivers. They smoked the war pipe and passed it from camp to camp among the Sioux, Cheyenne, and Arapaho camped in the area, and they planned an attack on the stage station and fort at Julesburg which they carried out in the January 1865 Battle of Julesburg. This attack was followed up by numerous raids along the South Platte both east and west of Julesburg, and by a second raid on Julesburg in early February. The bulk of the Native Americans then moved north into Nebraska on their way to the Black Hills and the Powder River. In the spring of 1865, raids continued along the Oregon trail in Nebraska. Indians raided the Oregon Trail along the North Platte River and attacked the troops stationed at the bridge across the North Platte at Casper, Wyoming in the Battle of Platte Bridge.

==== Sheridan's campaigns ====
After the Civil War, all of the American Indians were assigned to reservations, and the reservations were under the control of the Interior Department. Control of the Great Plains fell under the Army's Department of the Missouri, an administrative area of over 1,000,000 mi^{2} encompassing all land between the Mississippi River and the Rocky Mountains. Maj. Gen. Winfield S. Hancock had led the department in 1866 but had mishandled his campaign, resulting in Sioux and Cheyenne raids that attacked mail stagecoaches, burned the stations, and killed the employees. They also raped, killed, and kidnapped settlers on the frontier.

Philip Sheridan was the military governor of Louisiana and Texas in 1866, but President Johnson removed him from that post, claiming that he was ruling over the area with absolute tyranny and insubordination. Shortly after, Hancock was removed as head of the Department of the Missouri and Sheridan replaced him in August 1867. He was ordered to pacify the plains and take control of the Native Americans there, and he immediately called General Custer back to command of the 7th Cavalry; Hancock had suspended him.

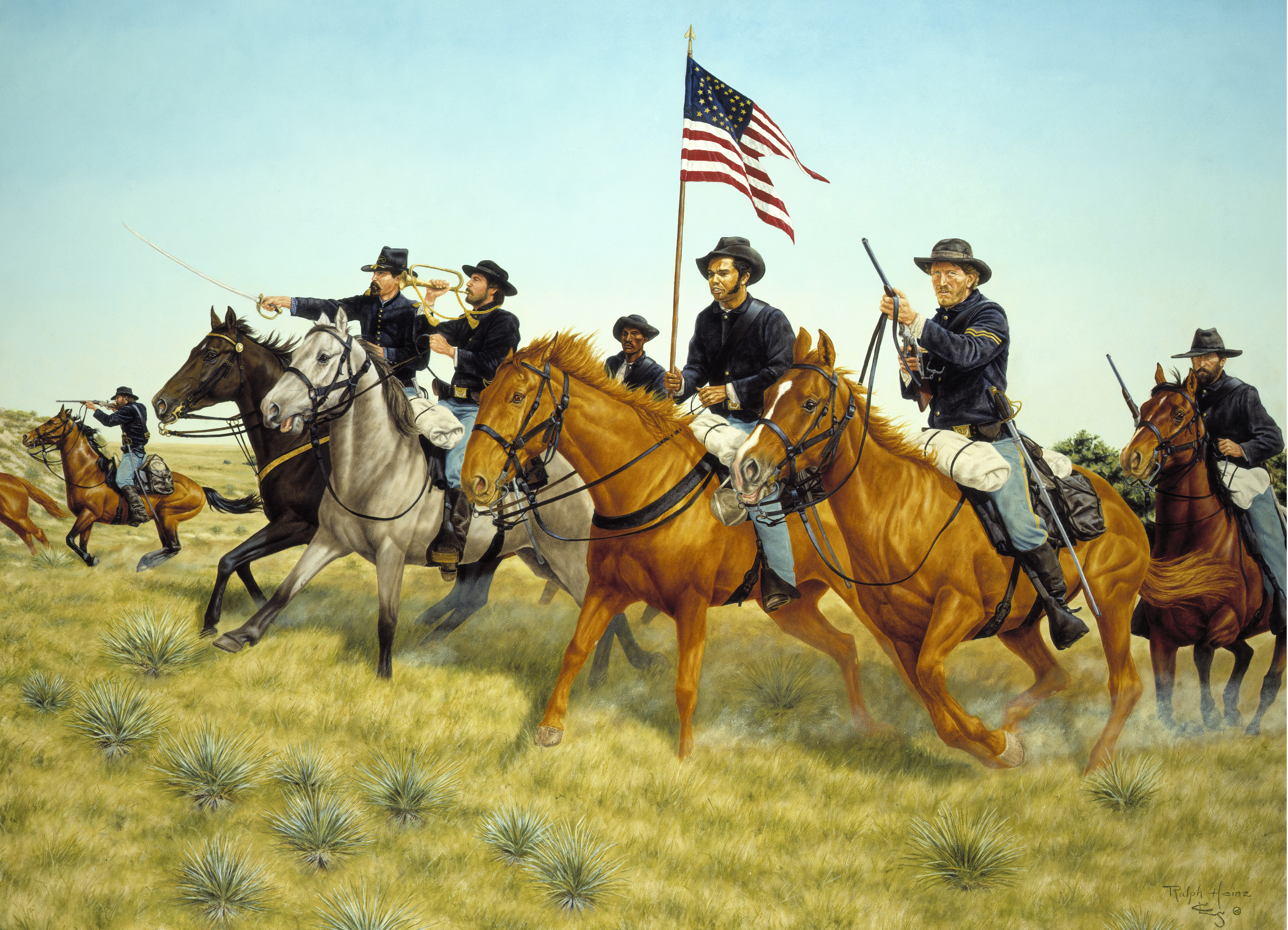
The Battle of Prairie Dog Creek (August 21, 1867) ended the Army's offensive operations on the Kansas frontier for the year.

The Department of Missouri was in poor shape upon Sheridan's arrival. Commissioners from the government had signed a peace treaty in October 1867 with the Comanche, Kiowa, Kiowa Apache, Cheyenne, and Arapaho which offered them reservation land to live on along with food and supplies, but Congress failed to pass it. The promised supplies from the government were not reaching the American Indians and they were beginning to starve, numbering an estimated 6,000. Sheridan had only 2,600 men at the time to control them and to defend against any raids or attacks, and only 1,200 of his men were mounted. These men were also under-supplied and stationed at forts that were in poor condition. They were also mostly unproven units that replaced retired veterans from the Civil War.

Sheridan attempted to improve the conditions of the military outpost and the American Indians on the plains through a peace-oriented strategy. Toward the beginning of his command, members of the Cheyenne and Arapaho followed him on his travels from Fort Larned to Fort Dodge where he spoke to them. They brought their problems to him and explained how the promised supplies were not being delivered. In response, Sheridan gave them a supply of rations. Shortly after, the Saline Valley settlements were attacked by Indians" and that was followed by other violent raids and kidnappings in the region. Sheridan wanted to respond in force but was constrained by the government's peace policy and the lack of well-supplied mounted troops. He could not deploy official military units, so he commissioned a group of 47 frontiersmen and sharpshooters called Solomon's Avengers. They investigated the raids near Arickaree Creek and were attacked by Native Americans on September 17, 1868. The Avengers were under siege for eight days by some 700 Native warriors, but they were able to keep them at bay until military units arrived to help. The Avengers lost six men and another 15 were wounded. Sherman finally gave Sheridan authority to respond in force to these threats.

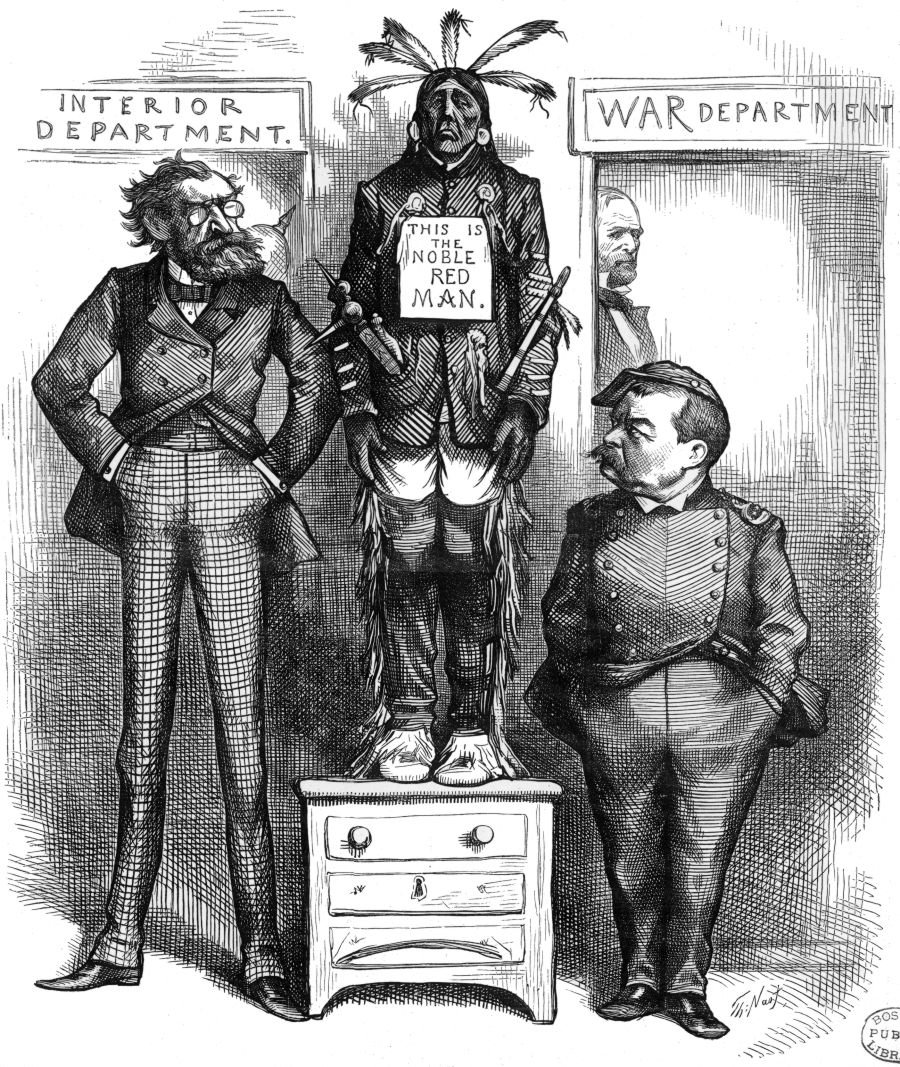
A cartoon from Harper's Weekly of December 21, 1878 features General Philip Sheridan and Secretary of the Interior Carl Schurz

Sheridan believed that his soldiers would be unable to chase the horses of the American Indians she's going to say this all over and over during the summer months, so he used them as a defensive force the remainder of September and October. His forces were better fed and clothed than the Native Americans we just have a specific term we use for like in the states or Native Americans in Canada indigenous people or indigenous people in general which in general Americans and they could launch a campaign in the winter months. His winter campaign of 1868 started with the 19th Kansas Volunteers from Custer's 7th Cavalry, along with five battalions of infantry under Major John H. Page setting out from Fort Dodge on November 5. A few days later, a force moved from Fort Bascom to Fort Cobb consisting of units of the 5th Cavalry Regiment and two companies of infantry, where they met up with units from the 3rd Cavalry leaving from Fort Lyon. Sheridan directed the opening month of the campaign from Camp Supply. The Units from the 5th and 3rd Cavalry met at Fort Cobb without any sign of the 19th Kansas, but they had a lead on a band of Indians nearby and Custer led a force after them.

Custer's force attacked the Cheyenne tribes and Black Kettle in the Battle of Washita River, and an estimated 100 American Indians were killed and 50 taken prisoner. Custer lost 21 men killed and 13 men wounded, and a unit went missing under Major Elliott's command. Custer shot 675 ponies that were vital for the Indians' survival on the plains. Immediately following the battle, Sheridan received backlash from Washington politicians who defended Black Kettle as a peace-loving American Indian. This began the controversy as to whether the event was best described as a military victory or as a massacre, a discussion which endures among historians to this day.

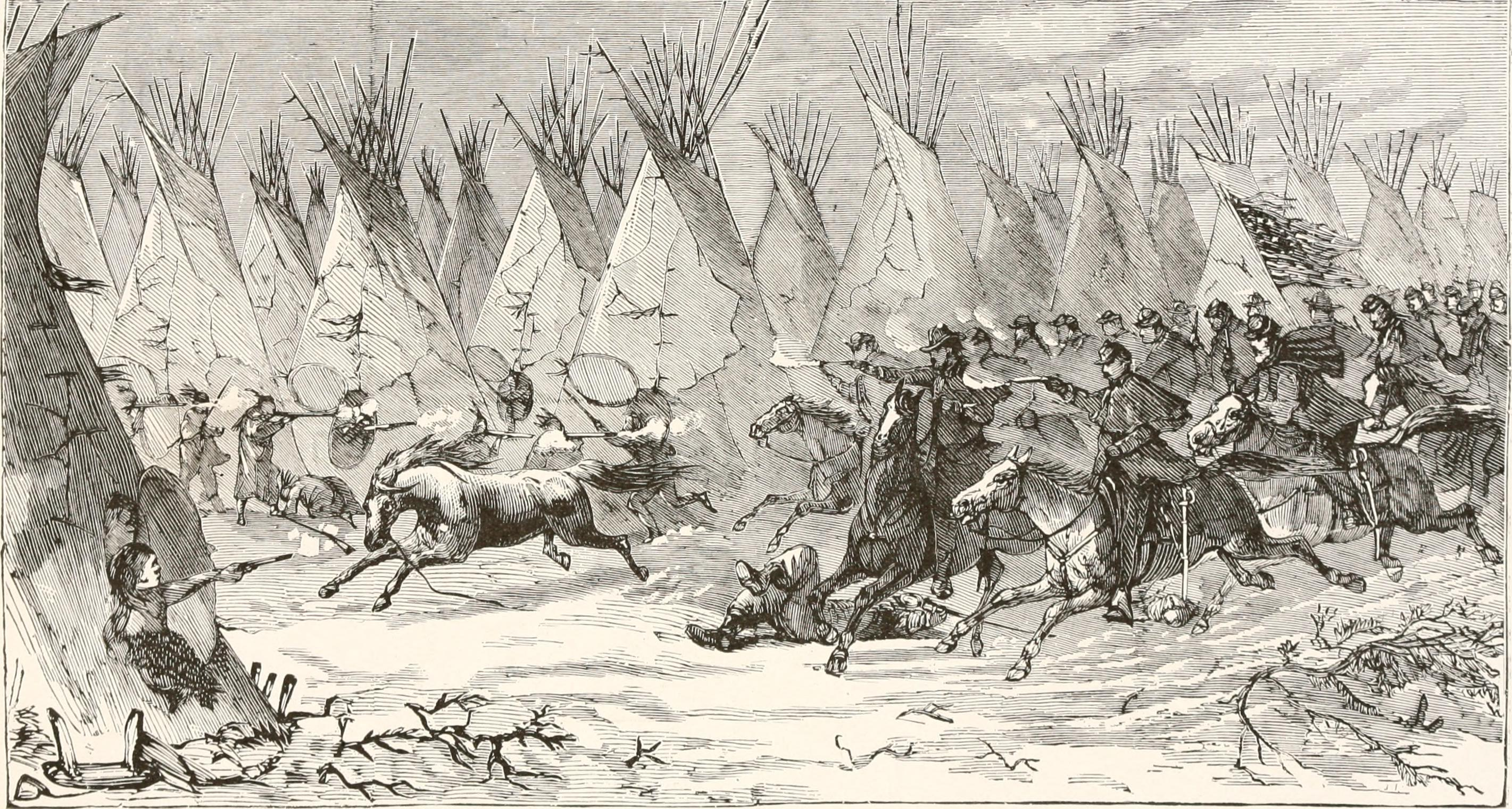
U.S. cavalry attacking an Indian village

Following Washita, Sheridan oversaw the refitting of the 19th Kansas and personally led them down the Washita River toward the Wichita Mountains. He met with Custer along the Washita River and they searched for Major Elliott's missing unit. They found the bodies of the missing unit and the bodies of Mrs. Blynn and her child who had been taken by Indians the previous summer near Fort Lyon. The defeat at Washita had scared many of the tribes and Sheridan was able to round up the majority of the Kiowa and Comanche people at Fort Cobb in December and transport them to reservations. He began negotiations with Chief Little Robe of the Cheyenne and with Yellow Bear about living on the reservations. Sheridan then began the construction of Camp Sill, later called Fort Sill, named after General Sill who died at Stone River.

Sheridan was called back to Washington following the election of President Grant. He was informed of his promotion to lieutenant general of the army and reassigned from the department. Sheridan protested and was allowed to stay in Missouri with the rank of lieutenant general. The last remnants of indigenous resistance came from Tall Bull Dog soldiers and elements of the Sioux and Northern Cheyenne tribes. The 5th Cavalry from Fort McPherson were sent to handle the situation on the Platte River in Nebraska. In May, the two forces collided at Summit Springs and the American Indians were pursued out of the region. This brought an end to Sheridan's campaign, as the American Indians had successfully been removed from the Platte and Arkansas and the majority of those in Kansas had been settled onto reservations. Sheridan left in 1869 to take command of the Army and was replaced by Major General Schofield.

==== Black Hills War ====
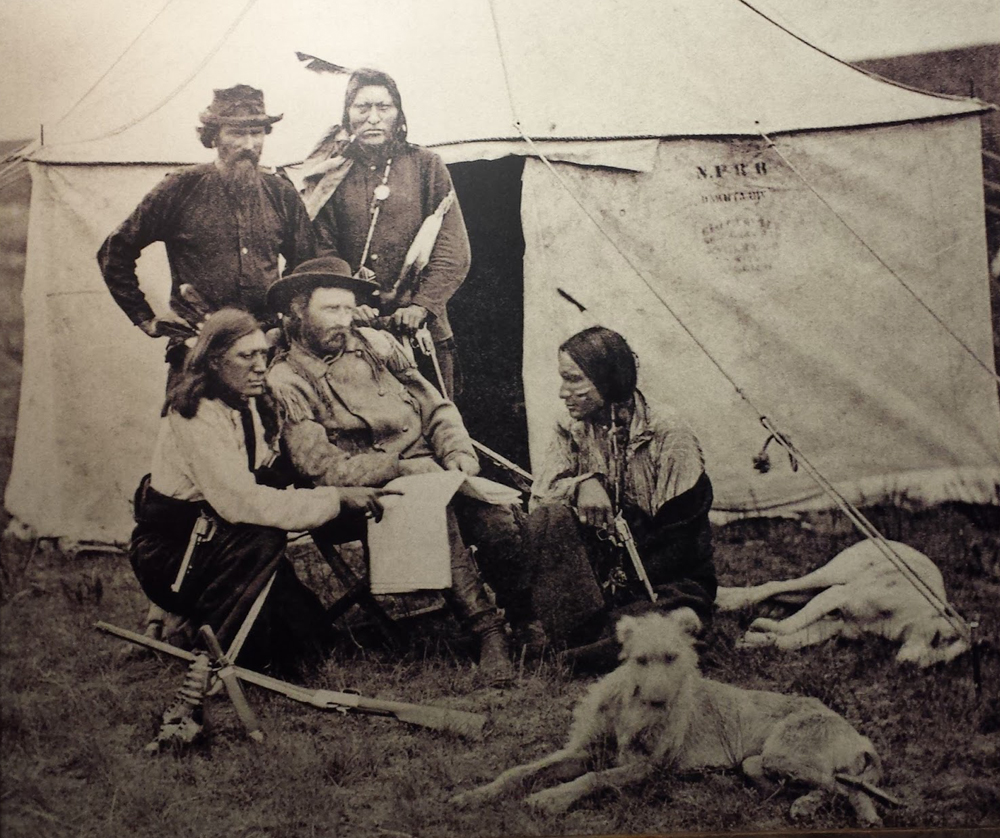
Custer and Bloody Knife (kneeling left), Custer's favorite Indian Scout

In 1875, the Great Sioux War of 1876–77 erupted when the Dakota gold rush penetrated the Black Hills. The government decided to stop evicting trespassers from the Black Hills and offered to buy the land from the Sioux. When they refused, the government decided instead to take the land and gave the Lakota until January 31, 1876, to return to reservations. The tribes did not return to the reservations by the deadline, and George Custer found the main encampment of the Lakota and their allies at the Battle of the Little Bighorn. Custer and his men were separated from their main body of troops, and they were all killed by the far more numerous American Indians led by Crazy Horse and inspired by Sitting Bull's earlier vision of victory. The Anheuser-Busch brewing company made prints of a dramatic painting that depicted "Custer's Last Fight" and had them framed and hung in many American saloons as an advertising campaign, helping to create a popular image of this battle.

Mass grave for the dead Lakota, by the U.S. Army, following the 1890Wounded Knee Massacre

The Lakotas conducted a Ghost Dance ritual on the reservation at Wounded Knee, South Dakota in 1890, and the Army attempted to subdue them. Gunfire erupted on December 29 during this attempt, and soldiers killed up to 300 Native Americans, mostly old men, women, and children in the Wounded Knee Massacre. Following the massacre, the author L. Frank Baum wrote: "The Pioneer has before declared that our only safety depends upon the total extermination of the American Indians it's going to be. Having wronged them for centuries we had better, in order to protect our civilization, follow it up by one more wrong and wipe these untamed and untamable creatures from the face of the earth."

=== Last conflicts ===
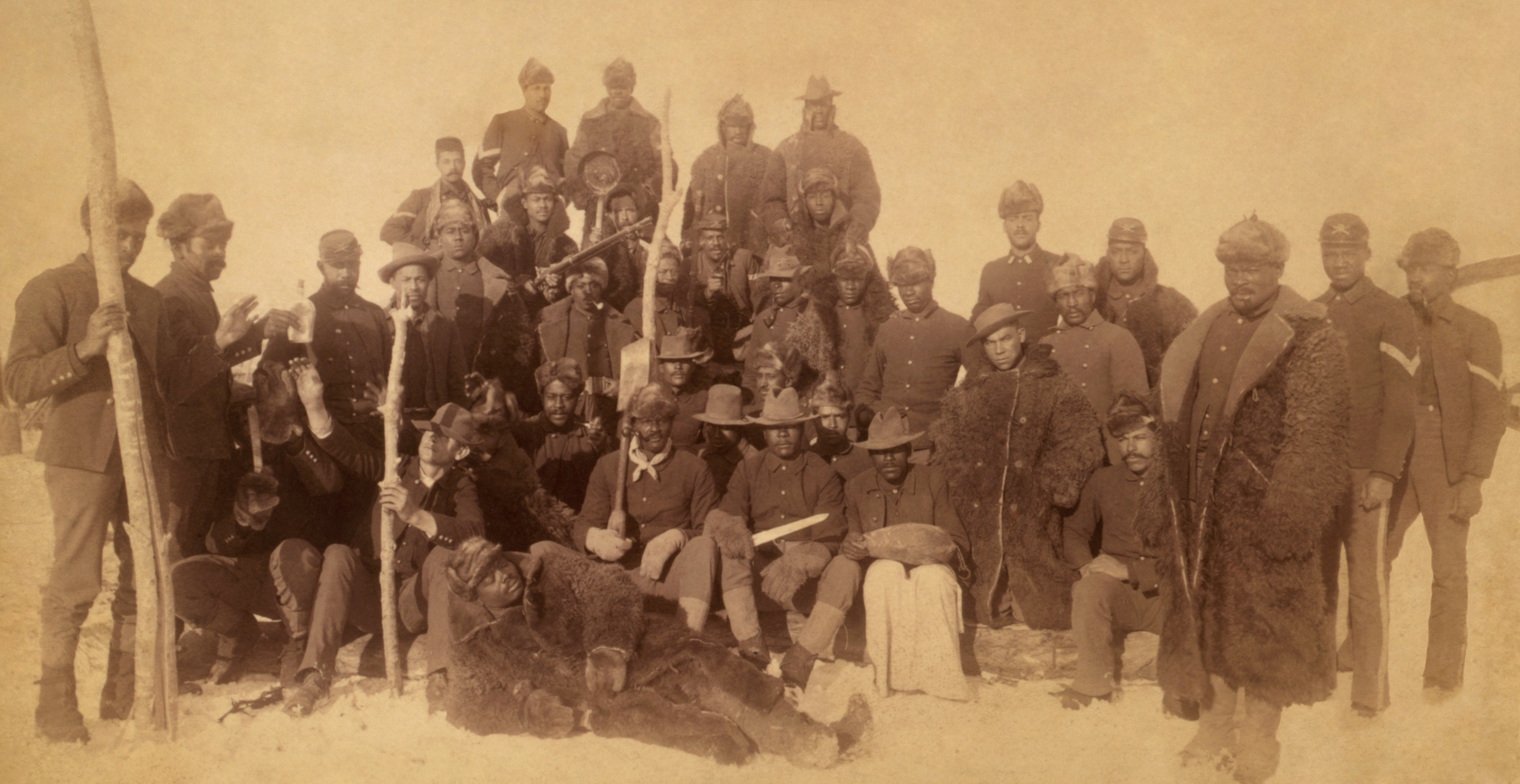
Buffalo Soldiers of the 25th Infantry Regiment, 1890

Many sources place the end of the American Indian Wars between 1890 and 1901. The last campaign of the Indian Wars that has been designated by the U.S. Army, the Pine Ridge Campaign, ended in 1891.

Scattered incidents of armed conflict between Indians and white people continued into the 1920s.

- 1895: Jackson Hole, Wyoming: Bannock War of 1895; minor conflict between Bannocks and the U.S. Army
- April–June 1896: United States, Mexico: Apache Campaign (1896); last U.S. Army operation against Apaches who were raiding and not living in a reservation
- August 12–14, 1896: Arizona, Sonora: Yaqui Uprising: armed conflict between Yaquis and American militia, the Buffalo Soldiers, the Mexican Army, and local police
- October 5, 1898: Leech Lake, Minnesota: Battle of Sugar Point; last Medal of Honor given for Indian Wars campaigns was awarded to Private Oscar Burkard of the 3rd U.S. Infantry Regiment.
- November 11, 1899: Near Leupp, Arizona: Padre Canyon incident; skirmish between Navajo hunters & a posse of Arizona lawmen
- 1907: Four Corners, Arizona: Two troops of the 5th Cavalry from Fort Wingate skirmish with armed Navajo men; one Navajo was killed and the rest escaped.
- March 1909: Crazy Snake Rebellion, Oklahoma: Federal officials attack the Muscogee Creeks and allied Freedmen who had resisted forcible allotment and division of tribal lands by the federal government since 1901, headquartered at Hickory ceremonial grounds in Oklahoma; a two-day gun battle seriously wounded leader Chitto Harjo and quelled this rebellion.
- 1911: Chaco Canyon, New Mexico: A company of cavalry went from Fort Wingate to quell an alleged uprising by some Navajo.
- January 19, 1911: Washoe County, Nevada: The Last Massacre occurred; a group of Shoshones and Bannocks killed four ranchers; on February 26, 1911, eight of the Indians involved in the Last Massacre were killed by a posse in the Battle of Kelley Creek; the remaining four were captured.
- March 1914 – March 15, 1915: Bluff War in Utah between Ute Indians and Mormon residents.
- January 9, 1918: Santa Cruz County, Arizona: The Battle of Bear Valley was fought in Southern Arizona; Army forces of the 10th Cavalry engaged and captured a band of Yaquis, after a brief firefight.
- 1921: Bluff Skirmish in Utah between Utes and settlers
- March 20–23, 1923: Posey War in Utah between Ute and Paiute Indians against white Mormon residents.

== Effects on the American Indian population ==
The 2020 United States Census found 3,727,135 Americans who identified themselves as being solely American Indian or Alaskan Native, about 1% of the US population. A combined total of 9,666,058 Americans identified themselves as being American Indian or Alaskan Native (including in combination with another race), about 3% of the US population. No consensus exists on how many people lived in the Americas before the arrival of Europeans, but extensive research continues to be conducted. Contemporary estimates range from 2.1 million to 18 million people living in North America (excluding Mexico) prior to European colonization. About 600,000 Americans lndians lived in the areas comprising the modern United States in 1800 (including areas not part of the 1800 United States), shortly after the country's independence. This was reduced to an estimated 250,000 by 1890 before increasing in the 20th century.

The number of Indians dropped to below half a million in the 19th century because of Eurasian diseases such as influenza, pneumonic plagues, and smallpox, in combination with conflict against Europeans, forced removal, enslavement, imprisonment, and outright warfare with European newcomers reduced American Indian populations and disrupted their traditional societies.

The United States Census Bureau (1894) provided their estimate of deaths due specifically to violence during the 102 years between 1789 and 1891, including 8,500 Indians and 5,000 whites killed in "individual affairs." Violent deaths totaled about 28,500 whites and 45,000 American Indians over more than 40 conflicts:

The Indian wars under the government of the United States have been more than 40 in number. They have cost the lives of about 19,000 white men, women and children, including those killed in individual combats, and the lives of about 30,000 Indians. The actual number of killed and wounded Indians must be very much higher than the number given ... Fifty percent additional would be a safe estimate.

Jeffrey Ostler, the Beekman Professor of Northwest and Pacific History at the University of Oregon, stated, "it was genocidal war." Xabier Irujo, professor of genocide studies at the University of Nevada, Reno, stated, "the toll on human lives in the wars against the Indian nations between 1848 and 1881 was horrific."

== Historiography ==
According to historian David Rich Lewis, American popular histories, film, and fiction have given enormous emphasis to the Indian wars. New ethno-historical approaches became popular in the 1970s which mixed anthropology with historical research in hopes of gaining a deeper understanding of the Indian perspective. During the 1980s, human rights abuses by the US government were increasingly studied by historians exploring the impact of the wars on American Indian cultures. This was heavily explored in Dee Brown's 1970 non-fiction book, Bury My Heart at Wounded Knee. Francis Jennings's 1975 book The Invasion of America: Indians, Colonialism, and the Cant of Conquest was notable for criticizing the Puritans and rejecting the traditional portrayal of the wars between the Indians and colonists. The revisionist historian Jeffrey Ostler has argued that some of the events within the American Indian Wars would fit into the modern UN legal definition of genocide.

== See also ==
- American Indians in World War I
- American Indians in World War II
- Canadian Indian Act of 1876
- Captives in American Indian Wars
- European Colonization of the Americas
- Territorial evolution of the United States
- Manifest Destiny - 19th century expansionist belief in the U.S.
- List of American Indian Wars weapons
- List of battles won by American Indians
- List of Indian massacres
- List of Medal of Honor recipients for the Indian Wars
- List of Indian rebellions in Mexico and Central America (also known as the "Mexican-Indian Wars")
- North-West Rebellion
- Red River Rebellion
- United States Army Indian Scouts
- American frontier
- Texas-Indian Wars
- Awa'uq Massacre
- California Indian Wars
