= Bear River Expedition =

1859 attack upon Native Americans

The Bear River Expedition took place between June 12 and October 18, 1859. Led by Major F. J. Porter, Company "G" from Camp Floyd was sent to investigate an incident between Native Americans and immigrants traveling on the California Trail, where it was claimed that the native peoples had murdered the travelers on that trail.

2nd Lieutenant E. Gay, under the command of Major Porter, encountered a group of Shoshone in Devils Gate Canyon in Weber County, Utah in what was at the time the Utah Territory and assumed that this was the same group involved in the incident he was sent to investigate. Leading a group of 42 men and some light provisions, he made an attack upon the encampment of what he estimated to be between 150 and 200 Shoshone warriors. In the official report, Lt. Gay claims to have killed 20 "indians" and about 6 of his men were wounded in the action, but there were no American soldier deaths.

The expedition continued on to the California Trail, where Major Isaac Lynde took over command.

While in what is today called Idaho, they encountered Chief Pocatello and had him arrested under suspicion of property theft and being responsible for the murder of several travelers on the road. Pocatello was eventually released after being cleared of the charges, and a meeting was arranged with the elder leaders of some of the surrounding tribal groups.

Other minor encounters with the native inhabitants of the area continued, and eventually the expedition returned to Camp Floyd satisfied that the issue had been resolved.
