= List of American Indian Wars weapons =

This is a list of weapons used in the American Indian Wars and Canadian Indigenous conflicts.

== Offensive weapons ==
=== Edged weapons ===
- Claymore
- Cutlass
- Dirk
- Flail
- Gunstock war club
- Improvised knife
- Inuit axe
- Jawbone war club
- Khanjali
- Lance
- Lochaber axe
- Morning star
- Pernach
- Shashka
- Snow knife
- Spear
- Stone war club
- Toggling harpoon
- Tomahawk
- Ulu
- War hatchet
- Wooden war club
- Yakutian knife

=== Sidearms ===
- Colt Single Action Army

=== Shotguns ===
- Coach gun

=== Rifles and muskets ===
- Berdan rifle
- Carle rifle
- Charleville M1728 musket
- Colt M1855 revolver carbine and rifle
- Henry repeating rifle
- M1856 six-line rifle musket
- Meylin M1719 Pennsylvania-Kentucky rifled musket
- Pattern P1722 Brown Bess musket
- Peabody M1862 Action rifle
- Russian musket model 1845
- Sharps M1848, M1863 carbine and rifle
- Spencer repeating carbine and rifle
- Springfield M1873 Trapdoor rifle
- Trade musket

=== Projectile weapons ===
- Bow
- Crossbow
- Throwing dart
- Throwing knife
- Throwing spear
- Throwing tomahawk

=== Explosives and grenades ===
- Adams grenade
- Dynamite
- Ketchum grenade
- Rains grenade
- Rains landmine

=== Machine guns ===
- Gatling machine gun

=== Artillery ===
- Hotchkiss cannon
- Parrott 10-pounder M1861 cannon

== Defensive weapons ==
- War shield

== Bibliography ==
- Loehr, Neil (2004), Weapons Of The Indian Wars (Plains History Project), St. Marys, Kansas: Kaw Valley USD 321, archived from the original on May 7, 2005
- Mahon, John K. (September 1958). "Anglo-American Methods of Indian Warfare". The Mississippi Valley Historical Review. 45 (2): 254–275. doi:10.2307/1902929. JSTOR 1902929.
- Morando, Paul (2018). "French Infantry Musket, M1728 ("Charleville")". The Army Historical Foundation.
- Rutherford, Kenneth R. (2020). America's Buried History: Landmines in the Civil War. Savas Beatie. About the Book. ISBN 978-1-61121-453-6. "By the end of the war in 1865, some 2,000 "Rains mines" had been built and deployed"
