= Box Elder Treaty =

1863 agreement between the Northwestern Shoshone and the United States government

The Box Elder Treaty is an agreement between the Northwestern Shoshone and the United States government, signed on July 30, 1863. It was adopted after a period of conflict which included the Bear River Massacre on January 29, 1863. The treaty had little effect until 1968, when the United States compensated the Northwestern band for their land claim at a rate of about 50¢ per acre.

== Background ==
Of the large and disparate Shoshone nation, about ten villages of people lived in the "Northwest" area and followed Chief Bear Hunter. They understood how to live in the desert and followed a pattern of seasonal migrations.

Incursions by the California Trail, the Oregon Trail and the Mormon pioneers created conflict between the Shoshone and the white settlers. The Shoshone attacked and killed a relatively small proportion of white immigrants—usually people who encroached far into Shoshone lands.

The 3rd California Volunteers, led by Patrick Edward Connor, initiated military contact with the Shoshone around October 31, 1860, when they executed "about 14 or 15 Indians" in retaliation for a reported attack on a wagon train. More were taken hostage and then killed when they did not produce Indians culpable for the wagon attack. Violent conflict between the two groups continued. Although the Mormon settlers generally disapproved of these actions by the U.S. military, they also became fearful of violent Indians, and executed an Indian resident of Brigham City after a dispute over payment. Conditions for the Shoshone deteriorated quickly.

The U.S. military launched an attack of unprecedented size on the Indian groups. On January 29, 1863, they encountered a number of Indians at Bear River. The exact intensity of the battle that followed is not fully known. The U.S. troops used howitzers, rifles, and pistols to kill several hundred Indians (including women and children), in an incident now called the Bear River Massacre. After the Indians were militarily defeated, the U.S. soldiers raped and violently attacked the survivors. According to Shoshone oral histories, Chief Bear Hunters was captured and tortured before he was killed.

This killing had a devastating effect on the indigenous people of the Great Basin, and compelled many groups to accept treaties in 1863. White settlers in the Great Basin accused the Shoshone band led by Chief Pocatello of ongoing hostility. According to one story, Pocatello had been hostile to White people since around 1860, when his father was hanged by settlers in wagon train.

James Duane Doty and General Patrick Edward Connor were the lead negotiators for the United States. Pocatello was the lead negotiator for the Indian groups. Some of the bands who agreed to the treaty had been reduced to just a few members after the events of January.

== Terms ==
The treaty calls for peaceable relations between the two groups. It contains a promise by the U.S. to pay the Shoshone $5,000 yearly as compensation for the "utter destitution" inflicted by war. It also recognizes the claim of Chief Pocatello and his people to the land "bounded on the west by the Raft River and on the east by the Porteneuf Mountains".

Text of the Box Elder Treaty

Articles of agreement made at Box Elder, in Utah Territory, this thirtieth day of July, A. D. one thousand eight hundred and sixty-three, by and between the United States of America, represented by Brigadier-General P. Edward Connor, commanding the military district of Utah, and James Duane Doty, commissioner, and the North Western Bands of the Shoshonee Indians, represented by their chiefs and warriors:

- Article I. It is agreed that friendly and amicable relations shall be reestablished between the bands of the Shoshonee Nation parties hereto, and the United States; and it is declared that a firm and perpetual peace shall be henceforth maintained between the said bands and the United States.
- Article II. The treaty concluded at Fort Bridger on the 2nd day of July 1863, between the United States and the Shoshonee Nation, being read and fully interpreted and explained to the said chiefs and warriors, they do hereby give their full and free assent to all of the provisions of said treaty, and the same are hereby adopted as a part of this agreement, and the same shall be binding upon the parties hereto.
- Article III. In consideration of the stipulations in the preceding Articles, the United States agree to increase the annuity to the Shoshonee Nation five thousand dollars, to be paid in the manner provided in said treaty. And the said Northwestern Bands hereby acknowledge to have received of the United States, at the signing of these articles, provisions and goods to the amount of two thousand dollars, to relieve their immediate necessities—the said bands having been reduced by the war to a state of utter destitution.
- Article IV. The country claimed by Pokatello for himself and his people is bounded on the west by Raft River and on the east by the Porteneuf Mountains.

Done at Box Elder, this thirtieth day of July, A. D. 1863.

Signatories to the Box Elder Treaty

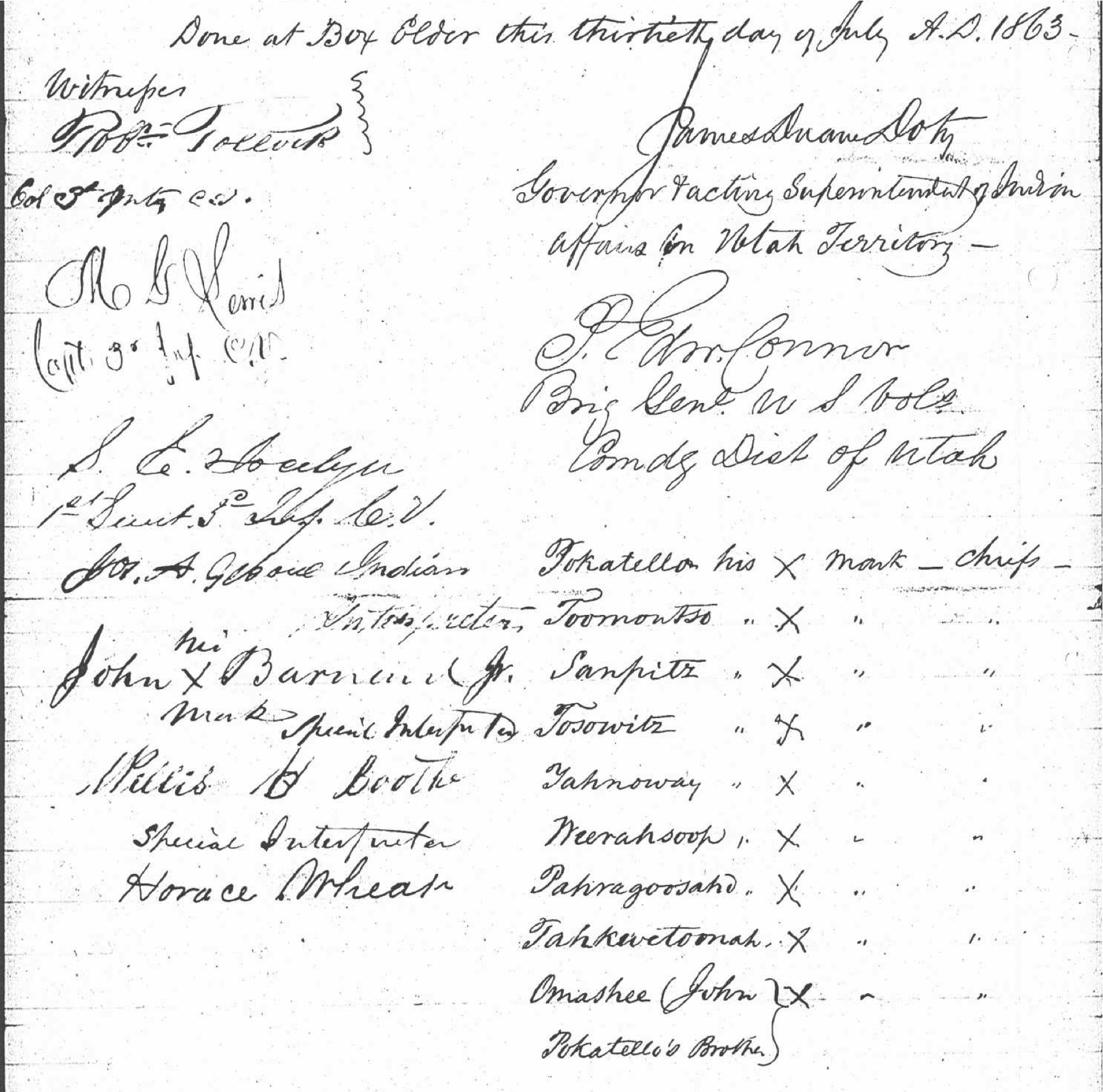

== Ratification ==
The U.S. Congress ratified the treaty, amending an additional article:

Article V: Nothing herein contained shall be construed or taken to admit any other or greater title or interest in the lands embraced within the territories described in said treaty in said tribes or bands of Indians than existed in them upon the acquisition of said territories from Mexico by the laws thereof.

This amendment counteracted the Shoshone's land claim, which had never been incorporated into Spanish or Mexican law. On November 18, 1864, six of the nine original Shoshone signers of the Box Elder treaty, including Pocatello, signed their agreement to the Senate's treaty amendment after meeting U.S. commissioners at Box Elder. Lincoln announced the treaty publicly on January 17, 1865.

== Outcome ==
After the treaty was signed, most of the Northwestern Shoshone gathered in the Cache Valley and Box Elder County. The U.S. successfully moved many of them to the Fort Hall Indian Reservation in Idaho after establishing it in 1868. Others converted to Mormonism and assimilated into Utah settler culture.

Indians were forcefully ejected from areas they attempted to settle within their supposed territory. Continuing white immigration destroyed the ecosystems upon which they relied and made their nomadic life impossible. They were resettled on a 500-acre tract in Box Elder County, which was owned and administered by the Church of Jesus Christ of Latter-day Saints (LDS Church). Later, they were encouraged to move to the Fort Hall Reservation.

Outside humanitarian assistance to the Shoshone came not from the U.S. government but eventually from the LDS Church headquartered in Salt Lake City, Utah.

Chief Pabawena wrote Utah Senator Arthur V. Watkins in 1949 to report:

We are the northwestern band of the Shoshone pretty poor conditions and their childrens starving there fathers no work everything pretty hard for us no money.

And later in 1949:

We are have received no anything from the Government since the treaty was made in Box Elder treaty on July 30, 1863.

== Action in U.S. legal system ==
In 1927–1929, the U.S. Congress passed a law allowing the United States Court of Claims to hear arguments from the Northwestern Shoshone.

The Northwestern Shoshone brought a lawsuit in 1930 alleging that the U.S. had reneged on promises made in the Treaty. In 1942, the Court of Claims denied their claim. The U.S. at first told the Shoshone that they were owed $10,800.17; this decision was reversed after the U.S. invoked previous monies it had spent on Indian affairs.

=== Northwestern Shoshone v. United States ===
The Supreme Court took the case and ruled in Northwestern Shoshone v. United States 324 U.S. 324 / 335 / 335 ( 1945 ) that the Box Elder Treaty was a non-binding "treaty of friendship".

The Court split 5–4 on its decision. Stanley F. Reed wrote in the majority opinion that the signatories of the treaty "did not intend" to respect the Shoshone's right to the land in question. The majority opinion says that, as the original signatories were dead and the situation of their descendants was hopeless, white people had a "moral obligation" to address the "sociological" problem, but not a legal obligation under a treaty.

Robert H. Jackson wrote in a concurring opinion that the 1929 law did not envision legal damages paid directly to indigenous groups.

William O. Douglas and Frank Murphy wrote two dissenting opinions. Douglas argued that by 1863 standards, the territory agreement described by the Box Elder Treaty "could hardly have been plainer".

The American Civil Liberties Union condemned the ruling as a restriction of rights based on "dubious technical grounds".

=== Indian Claims Commission ===
The Indian Claims Commission later acknowledged the validity of the claim, by way of the 1868 Fort Bridger Treaty. The Commission found on 13 February 1968 that 38,319,000 acres had been wrongfully taken from the northwestern Shoshone. Subtracting acres awarded by the Fort Hall Reservation and Wind River Reservation, it awarded $15,700,000—a price of slightly less than $0.50 per acre.

=== Attempted termination ===
Watkins and other members of Congress sought to "terminate" the special relationship with the Northwestern Shoshone in 1957. The group was persistent in arguing that it should retain its sovereignty, and avoided the termination of status which befell other groups.

== Notes ==
=== References ===
- Crawford, Aaron L. "The People of Bear Hunter: Oral Histories of the Cache Valley Shoshones Regarding the Bear River Massacre". Masters Thesis accepted at Utah State University, 2007.
- Fleisher, Kass. The Bear River Massacre and the Making of History. SUNY Press, 2004. ISBN 978-0791485200
- Grattan-Aiello, Carolyn. "Senator Arthur V. Watkins and the Termination of Utah's Souther Paiute Indians". Utah Historical Quarterly 63, 1995.
- King, Jeffrey S. "'Do Not Execute Chief Pocatello': President Lincoln Acts to Save the Shoshone Chief". Utah Historical Quarterly 53(3), 1983.
- Madsen, Brigham D. "Encounter with the Northwestern Shoshoni at Bear River in 1863: Battle or Massacre?" Dello G. Dayton Memorial Lecture, 11 May 1983. Ogden UT: Weber State College Press, 1984.
- Madsen, Brigham. ‘’The Northern Shoshoni’’. Caldwell, ID: Caxton Press, 1980/2007. ISBN 978-0870042669
- Miller, Rod. Massacre at Bear River: First, Worst, Forgotten. Caldwell, ID: Caxton Press, 2008. ISBN 978-0-87004-462-5
- Parry, Mae. "The Northwestern Shoshone". In A History of Utah's American Indians, ed. Forrest S. Cuch. Utah State University Press, 2010. ISBN 978-0-91373-849-8
- Wilkins, David E. American Indian Sovereignty and the U. S. Supreme Court : The Masking of Justice. Austin: University of Texas Press, 1997. ISBN 978-0292791084
