= Greenhorn =

Greenhorn may refer to:

== People ==
- Billy Greenhorn (1937–1995), American poet
- Stephen Greenhorn (born 1964), Scottish playwright and screenwriter

== Places ==
- Greenhorn, California, United States
- Greenhorn Creek in Colorado, United States
- Greenhorn Mountain, a mountain in Colorado, United States
- The Greenhorn Valley in Colorado, United States
- Greenhorn, Oregon, United States

== Other ==
- The Greenhornes, a rock band from Cincinnati, Ohio
- Greenhorn Limestone, a widespread geologic unit in the plains and mountainous Western United States
- A new recruit or rookie
