= Comanche history =

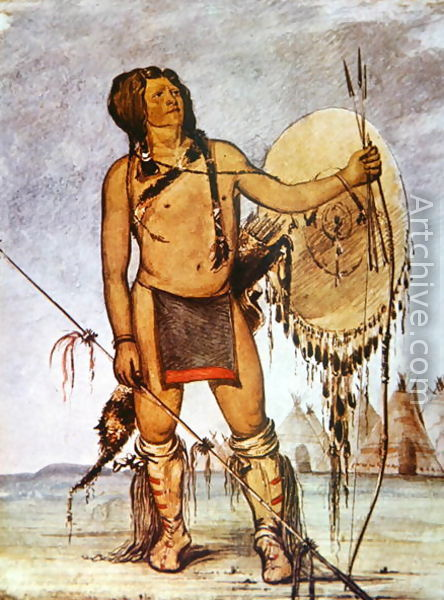
A Comanche warrior in 1835

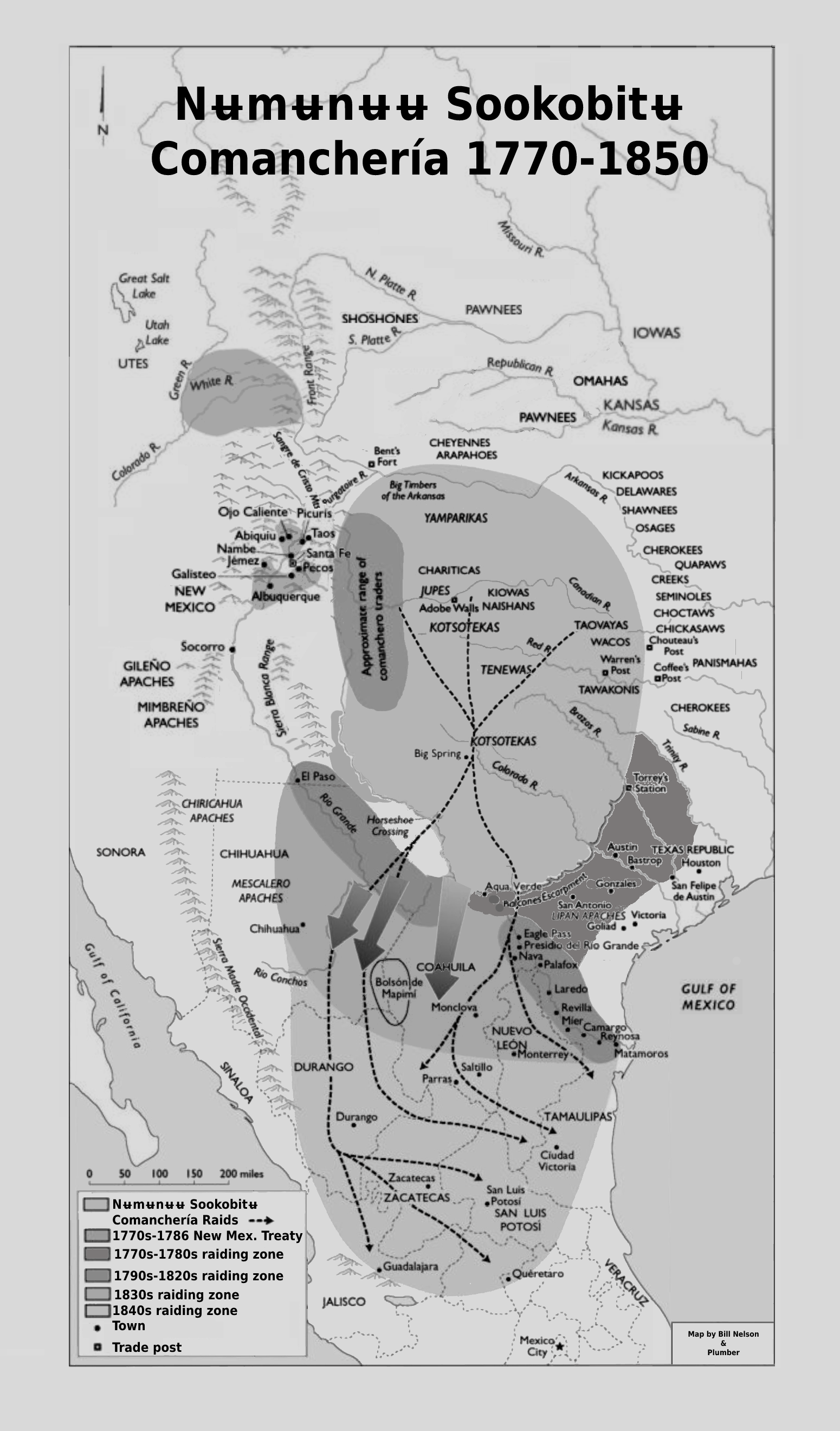
Comancheria

Comanche history /kəˈmæntʃi/ – in the 18th and 19th centuries the Comanche became the dominant tribe on the southern Great Plains. The Comanche are often characterized as "Lords of the Plains." They presided over a large area called Comancheria which they shared with allied tribes, the Kiowa, Kiowa-Apache (Plains Apache), Wichita, and after 1840 the southern Cheyenne and Arapaho. Comanche power and their substantial wealth depended on horses, trading, and raiding. Adroit diplomacy was also a factor in maintaining their dominance and fending off enemies for more than a century. They subsisted on the bison herds of the Plains which they hunted for food and skins.

Their extensive area of suzerainty has been called an empire, but the Comanche were never united under a single government or leader. They consisted of several bands with a common language which operated independently of each other. Estimates of the Comanche's total population in 1780, when they were most numerous, are usually around 20,000, although one estimate numbers them at 40,000.

The Comanche bands regularly waged war on neighboring tribes and European settlers encroaching on Comancheria. Although infamous for their unrelenting warfare and raiding into Mexico, they also took thousands of captives from raids on other Native tribes as well as Anglo settlers on the American frontier. Many of these captives were kept as slaves or traded to the Spanish in New Mexico, but captives taken by the Comanche at a young age were usually assimilated into Comanche society as members of the tribe. By 1875, decimated by European diseases, warfare, a tide of Anglo settlement, and the near-eradication of the bison, the Comanche had been defeated by the U.S. army and were forced to live on an Indian reservation in Oklahoma.

In 1920 the United States census listed fewer than 1,500 Comanche. Tribal enrollment in the 21st century numbered 15,191, with 7,763 members residing in the Lawton-Fort Sill and surrounding areas of southwest Oklahoma. Of the three million acres (12,000 km²) promised the Comanche, Kiowa and Kiowa Apache by treaty in 1867, only 235,000 acres (951 km²) have remained in native hands. Of this, 4,400 acres (18 km²) are owned by the tribe itself.

== Prehistory ==
The Comanche were closely related in language and tradition to the Eastern Shoshone of Wyoming. The Comanche probably split from the Shoshone in the 16th century with the Comanche moving southeast to Colorado and becoming, as did the Eastern Shoshone, bison-hunting Great Plains nomads. The movement onto the Great Plains may have been stimulated by wetter climatic conditions which permitted an increase in the bison population on the Great Plains.

In southern Colorado, the Comanche formed an alliance with the Ute and in the late 17th century, it appears the subsistence pattern of the two tribes were similar. From fall to early spring, the Comanche separated into small groups and were hunter-gatherers in western Colorado, especially the San Luis Valley. In late spring the Comanche and Ute crossed the Sangre de Cristo Mountains and moved eastward onto the Great Plains where they hunted bison during the summer months. They probably first acquired horses during the 1680s after the Pueblo peoples expelled the Spanish for 12 years from New Mexico and Spanish horses became available to the native peoples. The acquisition of horses enabled the Comanche to have the mobility to become wide-ranging nomads.

In 1706, Spanish soldier Juan de Ulibarri in the Pueblo settlement of Taos made the first European mention of the Comanche. He was told by the leaders of the settlement that "The infidel enemies of the Ute and Comanche tribe were about to make an attack upon this pueblo." The attack did not occur but the reputation of the Comanche as an aggressive tribe which raided sedentary peoples was established. The Ute word kɨmantsi, probably meaning 'enemy', was the name by which the Comanche became known. Their name for themselves was nɨmɨnɨɨ, meaning 'people'. The French, encountering the Comanche before 1740 called the Comanche Padouca, a name they also gave to the Apache, thus causing confusion in the early history of French contact with the two peoples.

== Comanche expansion: 18th century ==
Comanche history for the eighteenth century falls into three broad and distinct categories: (1) the Comanche and their relationship with the Spanish, Puebloans, Ute, and Apache peoples of New Mexico; (2) The Comanche and their relationship with the Spanish, Apache, Wichita, and other peoples of Texas; and, (3) The Comanche and their relationship with the French and the Indian tribes of Oklahoma and Kansas.

By the late 18th century, there were two distinct groups of Comanche. The western bands, resident in New Mexico, Colorado, Kansas, and the Texas panhandle were oriented toward the Spanish settlements of New Mexico; the eastern bands in south-western Oklahoma and central Texas were oriented toward the Spanish settlements of Texas. A third challenge to the Comanche were the French and their Indian allies on the eastern border of the Great Plains. In the 19th century the emigrant Five Civilized Tribes of Oklahoma and the Anglo residents of Texas presented new challenges to the Comanche.

=== Comanche and New Mexico ===
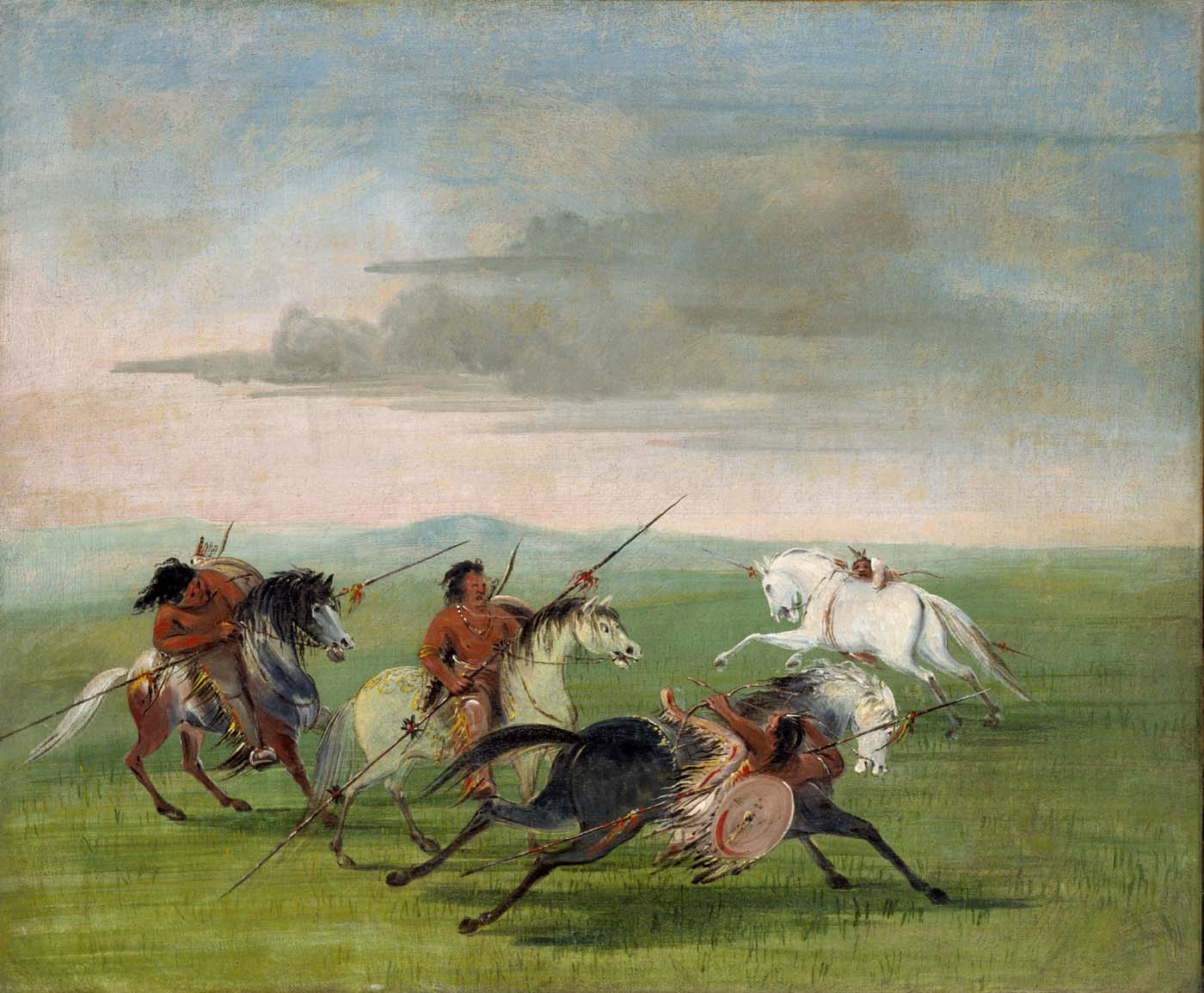
The Comanche were known for their horsemanship.

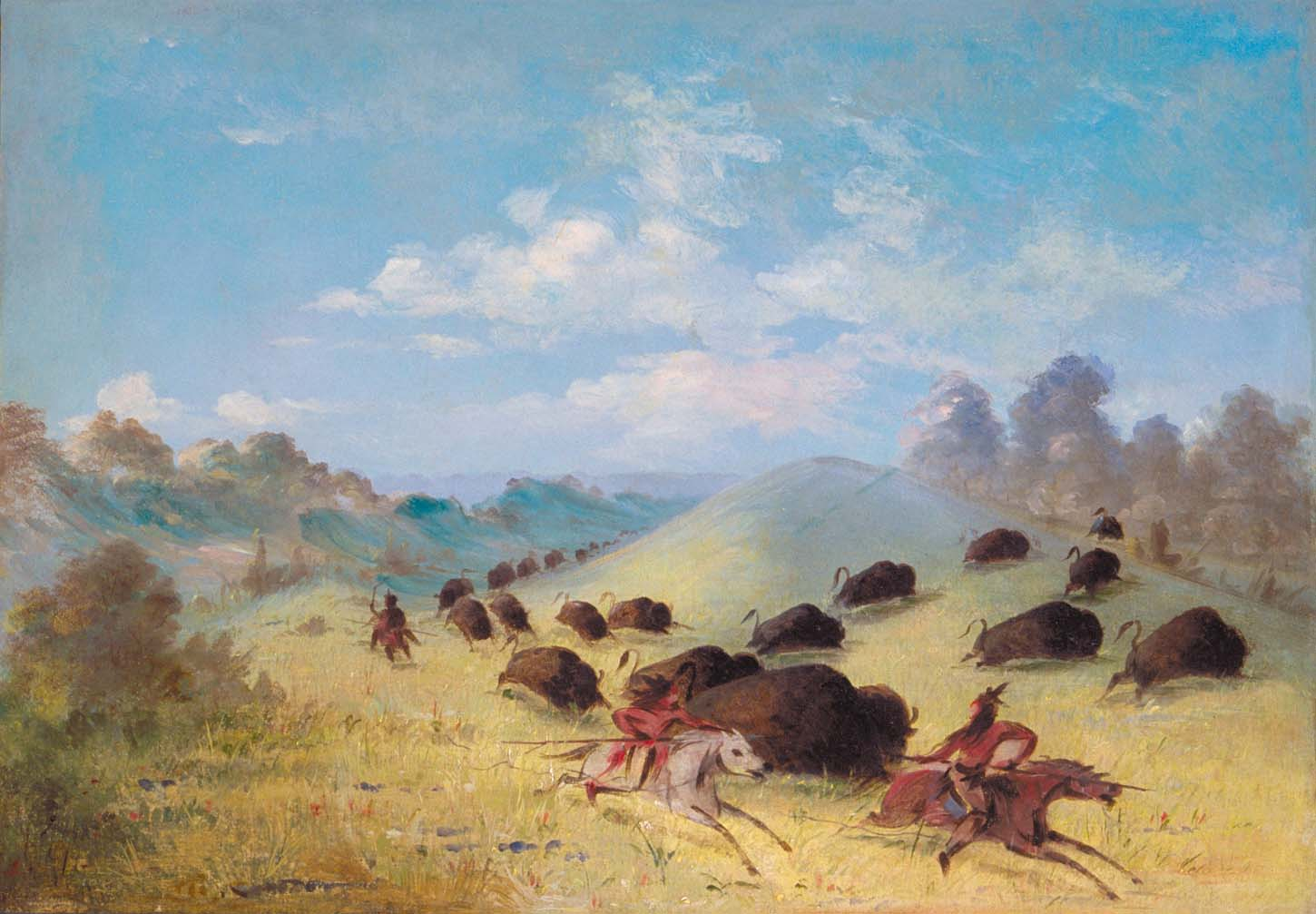
Comanche chasing bison, their main source of food

In the early 18th century the Ute and Comanche (who were probably the junior partners of the alliance at this time) established their primacy on the northern frontier of Spanish New Mexico, although their depredations consisted mostly of stealing livestock. In 1716, the governor of New Mexico launched an attack against a peaceful Ute/Comanche camp near San Antonio Mountain, 140 km (87 miles) north of the capital of Santa Fe, killing and capturing many and enslaving the captives. After that incident the conflict between the Spanish and Ute/Comanche became more violent. In 1719, the Ute and Comanche carried out a large raid in the Taos area and killed several people. The Spanish governor organized an expedition to punish the Indians and an army of more than 700, mostly Pueblos and Apache, marched north to the Arkansas River valley and searched for two months without finding a single Ute or Comanche. However, the expedition learned that the Apache peoples in southern Colorado were suffering heavy attacks from the Ute and Comanche. Several of the Apache bands would shortly seek safety nearer to the Spanish settlements in New Mexico; other bands would remain hostile to both the Spanish and the Comanche.

In the 1720s, the Comanche completed the conquest of the Arkansas River valley of Colorado, and in the 1730s they became the first fully-mounted, bison-hunting nomads of the Great Plains—the first American Indians to make the cultural shift to an equestrian economy. The Comanche pushed the Apache south and west off the Great Plains and continued to expand southward. The Comanche grew apart from their Ute allies, both culturally and politically in the 1730s, and in 1749, the Ute asked the Spanish in New Mexico for military assistance against the Comanche. The war between the Ute and Comanche would continue for the remainder of the 18th century, although the Comanche had greater priorities than the Ute.

The Puebloan and Spanish population in New Mexico in 1749 was only 15,000 and the Comanche, despite several military reverses, began to dominate the colony, alternately trading and raiding. In 1747, a Spanish and Puebloan force of more than 500 men attacked a Comanche and Ute camp near the Chama River, killing 107 of the Indians and capturing 206. In 1751, Spanish and Puebloan troops trapped 300 Comanche in a box canyon and killed 112 and captured 33. These defeats caused the Comanche to sue for peace. The peace agreement of 1752 was favorable to the Comanche, granting them trade privileges and treatment as a sovereign nation, and freeing them to make war on the Ute. In 1761, after a minor dispute, the Spanish joined the Ute, attacked a Comanche encampment and killed more than 400 and captured 300 people. The resultant peace agreement in 1762 was again mostly favorable to the Comanche granting them status as allies rather than enemies of the Spanish in New Mexico.

The 1762 peace agreement broke down after 1767 and the Comanche embarked on an intense campaign which over several years killed hundreds of Spanish and Puebloans and left the Rio Grande valley of New Mexico in ruins. In 1774, the Spanish responded. Six hundred soldiers surrounded a band of Comanches and killed 300 men, women, and children and took more than 100 prisoners. Being taken prisoner by the Spanish usually meant transport to the mines of Mexico or the sugar plantations of the Caribbean for men and slavery in Spanish households for women and children. Undeterred by their occasional defeats, the Comanche continued to strengthen their economic and political hold on New Mexico.

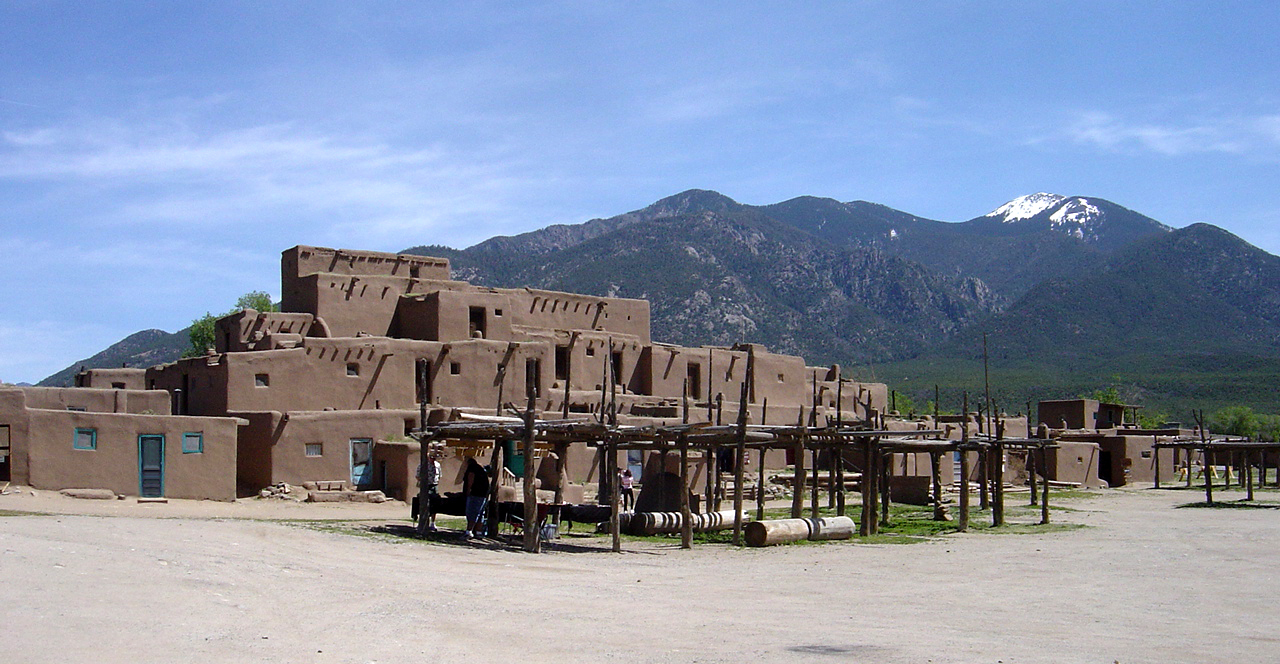
Taos was the most northerly settlement of Spanish New Mexico and a center for trade with the Comanche.

The last major battle between the New Mexican settlers and the Comanche took place in 1779. The governor of New Mexico, Juan Bautista de Anza, an experienced Indian fighter, took the war to the Comanche in their own country. With 800 men, including 200 Ute and Apache auxiliaries, he marched north and killed Cuerno Verde ("Green Horn") the most important Comanche war leader and many of his followers in the Greenhorn Valley south of Pueblo, Colorado. Raids dropped off noticeably but did not halt entirely. In the summer of 1785, De Anza let it be known that he was interested in making peace with the Comanches if they could agree on a single leader to represent them. The idea took root and received a major push when the eastern Comanche in Texas signed a peace treaty, negotiated by Pedro Vial and Francisco Xavier Chaves, that autumn with Texas Governor Domingo Cabello y Robles.

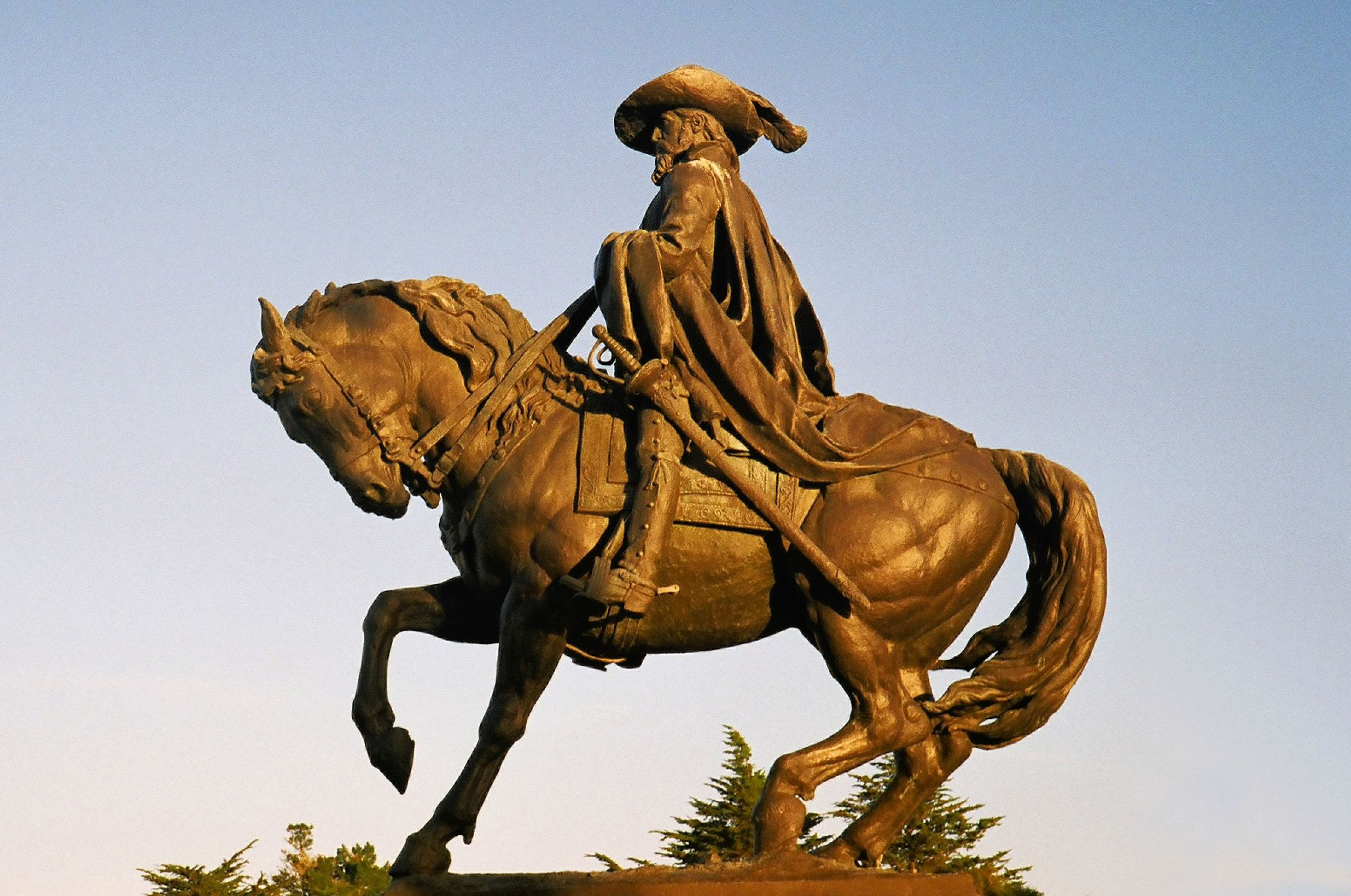
Juan Bautista de Anza who negotiated a lasting peace between New Mexico and the Comanche in 1786

Among the western Comanche, the main opposition to peace was a leader named White Bull (Toro Blanco). The peace faction of the Comanche assassinated him and the Kotsoteka, Jupe, and Yamparika sub-tribes gave the power to make peace to a leader named Ecueracapa. After two meetings at Pecos and another in a Comanche camp early in 1786, De Anza sent a signed treaty to Mexico City in July. De Anza also arranged a truce between the Ute and Comanche, while gaining a Comanche alliance with the Spanish against the Apache, many groups of which were hostile to the Spanish. The 1786 agreement established a nominal submission of the Comanche to Spanish authority, while in practice they were left almost fully independent, but most importantly, it ended major hostilities between the Comanche, and the Spanish and Puebloans of New Mexico.

The peace of 1786 endured. The Comanche and Spanish undertook joint operations against their common Apache enemy. The Spanish extended their settlements eastward onto the Great Plains and the population of New Mexico increased. The Spanish showered the Comanche with gifts and removed trade restrictions on guns and ammunition. A few Comanche sent their children to Spanish schools. Travelers crossed the Plains from east to west without danger. A class of traders, called Comancheros, transported Spanish goods into the Comanche heartland in the Texas panhandle and traded for buffalo robes, meat, and horses.

After the fall of the viceroyalty of New Spain in 1821, and with a safe-haven in New Mexico, the Comanche began to raid deep into Mexico. The reasons for this complete reversal can be attributed to two main reasons. Firstly, their sworn allegiance was to the monarchy of king Ferdinand VII of Spain, whose royal authority had ceased to exist. Thus, the 1786 pact had been extinguished. Even more critically, the Spanish tributes to the Comanche had ceased as a consequence of the Mexican war of Independence, and had not been renewed by newly independent Mexico. In 1841 New Mexico Governor Manuel Armijo was ordered by the Mexican central government to join a military campaign against the Comanche, but Armijo declined. "To declare war on the Comanches would bring complete ruin to the Department of New Mexico."

=== Comanche and Texas ===
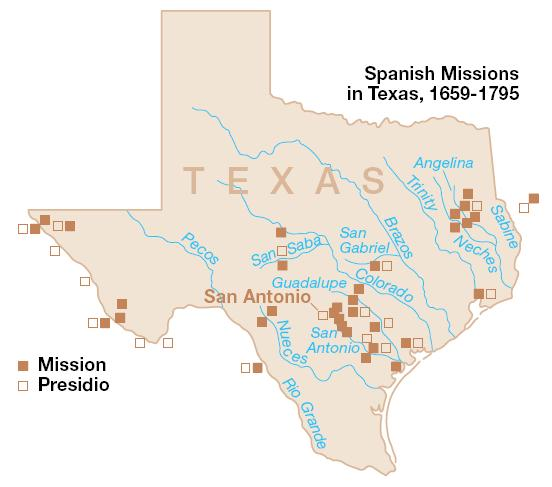
18th century Spanish missions and settlements in Texas. The Comanche ranged from the Pecos River to beyond the Brazos River and south almost to San Antonio.

Similar to the Spanish colonies in New Mexico, the struggling Spanish colonies in Texas barely survived Apache and Comanche hostility during the 18th century. In the 1770s the Spanish population of Texas was only about 3,000 although the Spanish were reinforced by being allied at one time or another with many of the Indian tribes of the colony.

The first record of the Comanche in Spanish Texas is 1743 when a scouting party visited San Antonio. By that time, the Comanche had already pushed the Apache off the Great Plains into southern Texas where they became the Lipan Apache, to the deserts of the southwest, or into close proximity and alliance with the Spanish in New Mexico. The Spanish and Lipan had initially been at war with each other but in 1749 they made peace in common accord to resist the Comanche threat. The peace endured only a few years.

In Texas in the 1750s, the Comanche allied themselves with the group of tribes the Spanish called Norteños or northerners as they resided north of the Spanish settlements. The Norteños consisted of the Wichita, especially their sub-tribe of the Taovayas who had moved southward to the Red River valley of Oklahoma and Texas about 1750, the Tonkawa of the Texas plains and the Hasinais, the westernmost of the Caddo people. In 1758 a large band of Norteños, including Comanches, sacked the San Saba Mission, established by the Spanish to advance northward from San Antonio and to make Christians of the Lipan. In 1759, a Spanish and Indian army of more than 500 men attempted revenge for San Saba by attacking two large fortified Taovaya villages in the Red River Valley near Spanish Fort, Texas. They were defeated in the Battle of the Twin Villages by the Taovaya and the Comanche.

Initially, the Comanche in Texas traded meat and buffalo pelts to the Taovayas and other Wichita sub-tribes, who were farmers, for agricultural products, especially maize. The Wichita also served as middlemen for the trade of Comanche horses to Spanish colonies in Louisiana. In the 1770s that alliance broke down. The Wichitas were severely weakened by outbreaks of European diseases. The Comanche moved eastward to the Brazos River and began to trade directly with the Spanish and French population of Louisiana. Meanwhile, the Spanish in Texas were also menaced by the powerful Osage tribe on its northeastern frontier and Apache raids south of the Rio Grande River in Mexico and began seeking peace with the Comanche. However, in 1778 the massacre of a Comanche peace delegation in eastern Texas ignited the most serious Comanche attacks on Spanish settlements and other Indian tribes yet seen in Texas. The Spanish dream of a powerful colony in Texas to counter the advance of British and French colonists was dashed as Spanish Texas came under heavy assault by the Comanche.

In 1780-1781, a smallpox epidemic reduced the Indian population, including the Comanche. The epidemic, plus a realization by both Spanish and Comanche that they had other interests and enemies, led to moves toward peace by both parties. In 1785, brokered by the Wichita, Pedro Vial and Comanche-speaking Francisco Xavier Chaves negotiated an agreement with the eastern Comanche which included large gifts to the Comanche and the return by the Comanche of all Spanish prisoners they held captive. As mentioned above that agreement led to a similar agreement between the Spanish of New Mexico and the western Comanche in 1786.

=== Comanche and the French, Osage, and Pawnee ===
The French had few face-to-face contacts with the Comanche. Their contacts were indirect through the Indian tribes that they traded with on the eastern border of the Great Plains. French traders were living along the lower Missouri River and in Louisiana early in the 18th century. The French interest was economic as opposed to the Spanish interests in colonizing, exploiting mineral wealth, and spreading Christianity among the Native American peoples. In 1720, the Spanish sent out a military expedition to expel French traders from the plains, but most of the members of the Villasur expedition were killed by the Pawnee in Nebraska. The first Frenchmen known to have met the Comanche were the brothers Pierre Antoine and Paul Mallet in 1739. The Mallets met the "Laitane" (Comanche) along the Arkansas River in Colorado. The French brokered a peace agreement between the Wichita and the Comanche in 1746.

The most powerful tribe the Comanche faced in the eastern Great Plains were the Osage who prevented the Comanche from advancing eastwards beyond approximately the middle portion of both Kansas and Oklahoma. In the 18th century the Osage expanded from their Missouri home onto the Great Plains to hunt bison and satisfy the French demand for bison robes and slaves. The Osage had ready access to French products, including guns. The hostility of the Osage forced the Wichita, trading partners and allies of the Comanche, to move southward from northern Oklahoma and southern Kansas to the Red River Valley of Oklahoma and Texas about 1750. In northern Kansas and Nebraska, the Comanche were sporadically at war with the Pawnee, another powerful tribe allied with the French. From the 1740s onward the Comanche raided the Pawnee for slaves and the Pawnee raided the Comanche for horses.

== Rise and fall: nineteenth century ==
In 1805, the governor of Louisiana James Wilkinson said the Comanche were "the most powerful nation of savages on this continent." The Comanche controlled 200,000 sq mi (520,000 km^{2}) of the Great Plains, possessed a marketable commodity with their large herds of horses, and relied on the seemingly inexhaustible herds of bison for subsistence. A smallpox epidemic had thinned their numbers in 1780-1781. Reoccurrences of smallpox and other European diseases would continue to cause a decline in their numbers, but they still numbered about 20,000 as their population was bolstered by captives adopted into the tribe. In 1823, the Mexican government estimated that the eastern Comanche had 2,500 captives among their numbers, and that was not counting a sizeable number of persons who had voluntarily joined the tribe. An estimate from the early 1830s claimed 500 to 600 not counting Native Americans in slavery. In 1790 the Comanche added new Native American partners: 2,000 Kiowa and Kiowa-Apache joined them as allies in Comancheria. The peace agreements with the Spanish remained mostly effective, keeping a delicate balance between "accommodation and antagonism." The Spanish continued to give gifts and hospitality to the Comanche. The French were gone after 1803 when they sold Louisiana to the United States.

Anglo-Americans on the borders of Comancheria provided a new market and new dangers for the Comanche. The Spanish were few in numbers; the Americans were numerous. The Spanish and Puebloan population of New Mexico was 25,000 in 1800 and was increasing after decades of war with the Comanche. Texas had a Spanish population of perhaps 5,000. In contrast, the United States had a population of 10 million in 1820 and Anglo-Americans were beginning to settle in Texas. The Anglo market for Comanche horses and mules was large. Irish-born Phillip Nolan was one of the first American traders with the Comanche in the 1790s.

The peace with the Spanish in Texas suffered stains after 1795 and in New Mexico when the Mexican War of Independence began in 1810, although the Comanche continued to trade with the Spanish. The tribute extended to the Comanche dried up as the new country of Mexico had few resources to devote to its remote provinces. In 1822 the Mexicans made a grand effort to reduce the Comanche threat by inviting a delegation of Comanche leaders to Mexico City and signing a treaty "between the Mexican Empire and the Comanche Nation" that granted many trading privileges to the Comanche. In 1824, attempting to secure the survival of the settlements in Texas, the Mexican government opened Texas to foreign settlers and the Anglo-Americans, who were already trading extensively with the Comanche, swarmed in. The concern of the Mexicans was real. In 1825, 330 Comanche rode into San Antonio, the capital and largest city of Texas, and remained there for six days, looting and enjoying themselves. In 1832, 500 Comanche occupied San Antonio for several days without any resistance from Mexican soldiers. The weakness of Mexican Texas enabled the Anglos to win the independence of Texas from Mexico in 1836.

=== Comanche and independent Texas: 1836–1845 ===
By 1836, when Texas gained independence, the inflow of Anglo immigrants had erased the demographic advantage of the Comanche and their allies. From fewer than 5,000 Spanish in the early 19th century, the population of Texas in 1836 was 38,000 Spanish and Anglo inhabitants. The population of Native Americans in Texas, including the Comanche, was estimated at 14,000 (possibly an underestimate). Moreover, as the Anglo population of Texas grew rapidly, the Indians suffered additional losses from smallpox in the late 1830s. In 1840, however, the Comanche gained important allies. An agreement with the southern branches of the Cheyenne and Arapaho tribes ended a wasting war on the Comanche's northern frontier and gained about 2,000 new allies. The Cheyenne and Arapaho were allowed to live in Comancheria and, as customary, the peace makers exchanged gifts. The Comanche were generous. They gave about five horses from their vast herds to each Cheyenne and Arapaho man and woman.

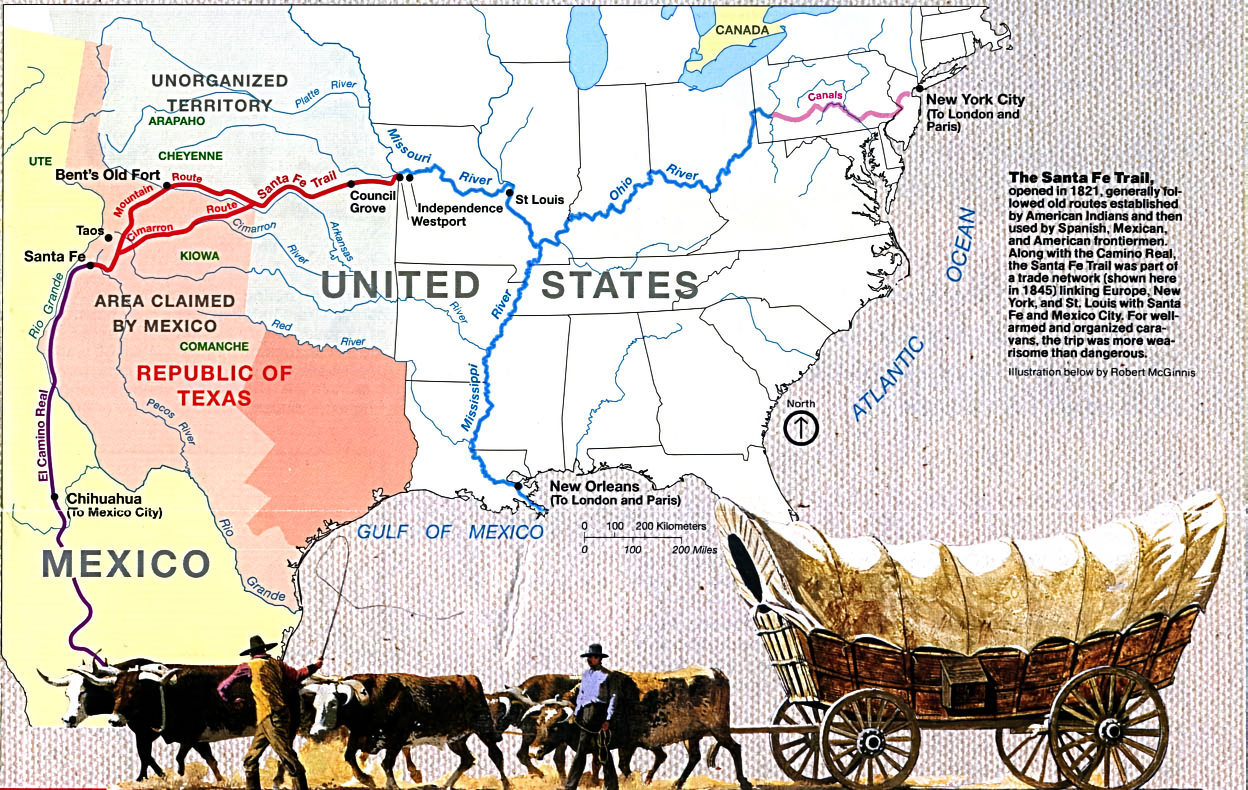
Comancheria and environs, 1836–1845

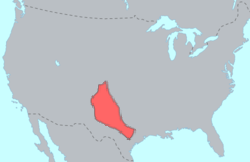
Comanche territory c.1850

The new Republic of Texas had immediate problems with the Comanche. In May 1836, Comanche and Kiowa warriors killed five men and captured five women and children at Fort Parker, 100 miles south of Dallas. One of the captives was 9-year-old Cynthia Ann Parker who later married a chief, Peta Nocona, and gave birth to a son, Quanah Parker, who would become the last war chief of the Comanche in the 1870s. The egalitarian and acquisitive nature of Comanche society facilitated the integration of captives into the tribe as they needed labor to manage their large domain.

The first President of Texas, Sam Houston, negotiated with the Comanche with the objective of establishing a firm border between the Anglo settlers and Comancheria. His successor Mirabeau B. Lamar, confronted the Comanche directly. In 1840, the Comanche sent a peace delegation to San Antonio and in a dispute about captives the Texas soldiers killed 35 Comanche, many of them chiefs, in the Council House Fight. In response the Comanche under a surviving chief, Buffalo Hump, launched the Great Raid of 1840, sacking the towns of Victoria and Linville (near the Gulf of Mexico), killing several people, and capturing a huge amount of goods. With the help of Tonkawa scouts, Texas militia ambushed the retreating (and careless) Comanche in the Battle of Plum Creek near Lockhart, Texas, recovering some of the goods and killing several Comanche. Later that year, Texas militia attacked a Comanche village and killed 140 men, women, and children.

Mirabeau's campaigns against the Comanche bankrupted the Texas government and both Texas and the Comanche sought peace. A treaty between the Republic of Texas and Texas Comanches was ratified in December 1845. It established a line of trading houses which functioned as a border between Texas and Comancheria. The Comanche agreed to refrain from raiding in Texas in exchange for gifts and trading privileges with Texans.

=== Raiding Mexico: 1779–1870 ===
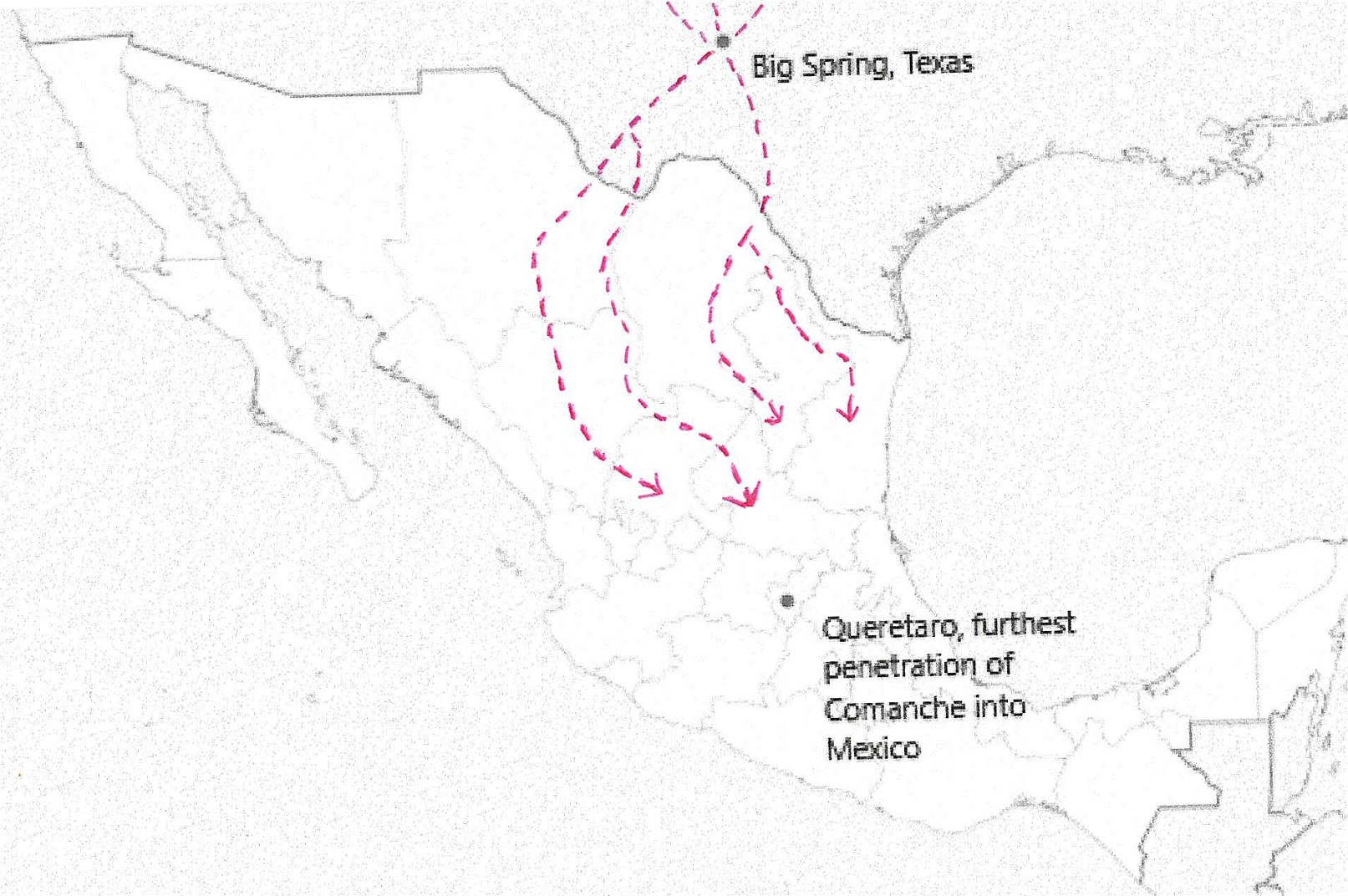
Comanche raids into Mexico usually started in Big Spring, Texas and penetrated by several routes deep into Mexico. Querétaro is 1,400 kilometres (870 mi) south of Big Spring.

After 1840, Comanche policy in Texas became more defensive. Instead, the Comanche prioritized accessing the riches to be found south of the U.S. border in Mexico. The Comanche raided south of the Rio Grande as early as 1779, their target being the Lipan Apache. In the 1820s, the newly independent and weak Mexican state could not defend its northern outposts, nor provide the Comanche the yearly tribute to which they were accustomed. In 1826, responding to the increased threat, the government of Nuevo Leon forbade its citizens in the northern portions of the state to travel in the countryside except in groups of at least 30 armed and mounted men. Large scale Comanche raids began in 1840 and continued until 1870. The Comanche and their allies, the Kiowa and other tribes, raided hundreds of miles south of the border, killing thousands of people and stealing hundreds of thousands of head of livestock, much of which they sold to Anglo-Americans in the United States. In 1848, traveler Josiah Gregg said that "the whole country from New Mexico to the borders of Durango is almost entirely depopulated. The haciendas and ranchos have been mostly abandoned, and the people chiefly confined to the towns and cities."

The northern states of Mexico and the soldiers and militia they could muster were left on their own to deal with the Comanche raids. The national government of Mexico was "too incapacitated by fiscal insolvency, civil war, and, ultimately, foreign intervention" to assist the north.

=== Comanche and the United States: 1845–1875 ===
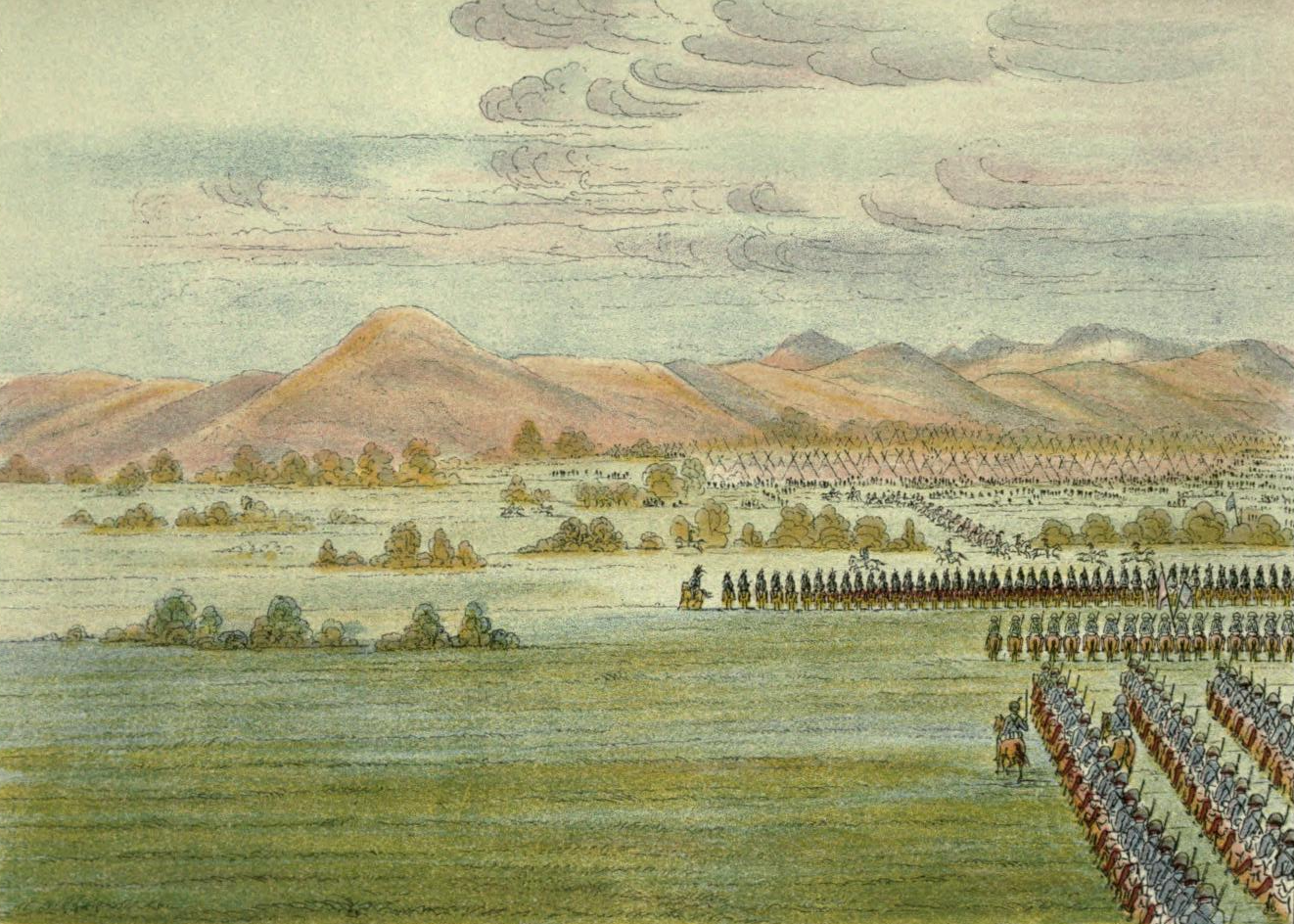
First meeting between the U.S. army and Comanche, 1834, Wichita Mountains – painting by eyewitness George Catlin

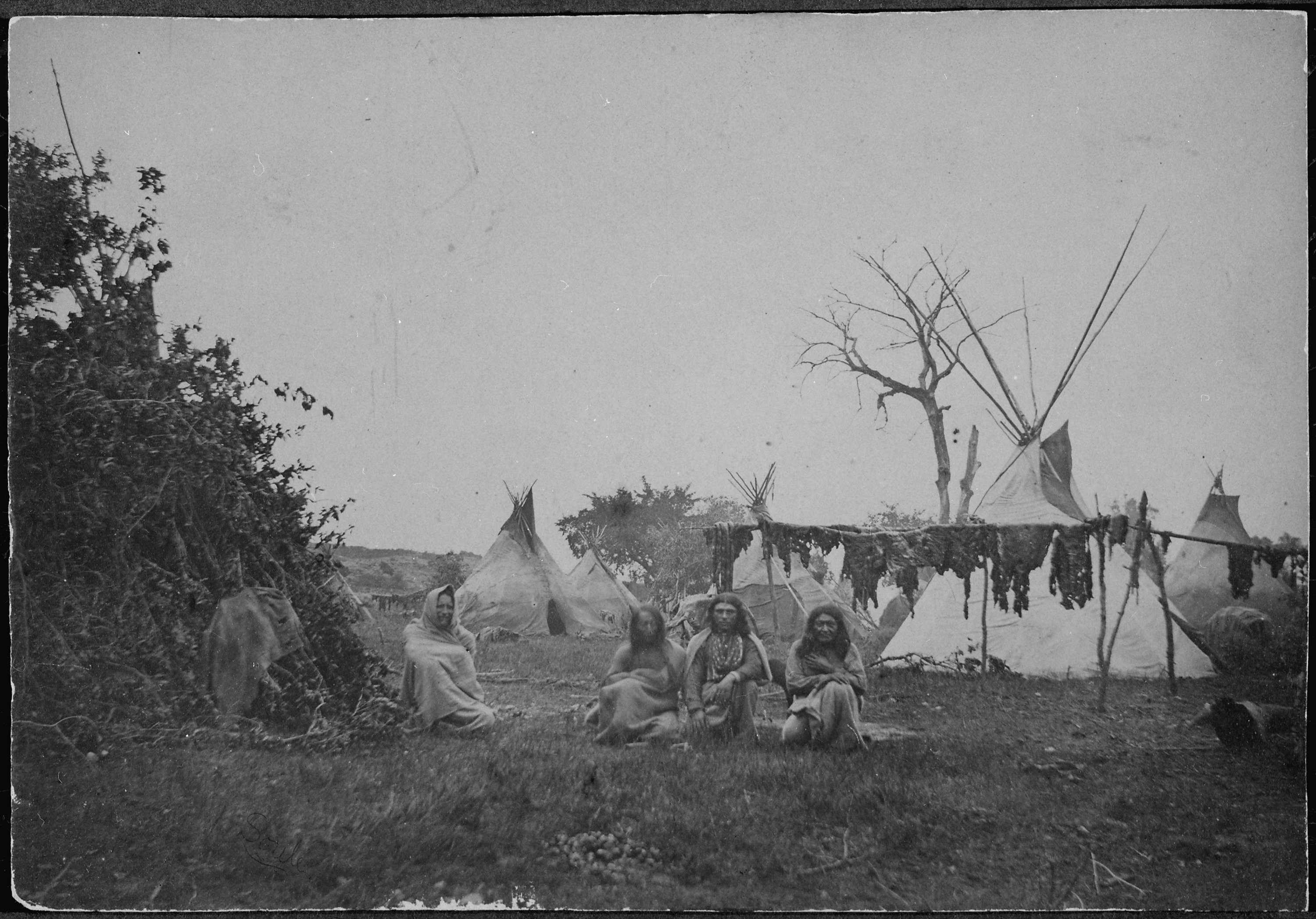
A Comanche camp in 1871

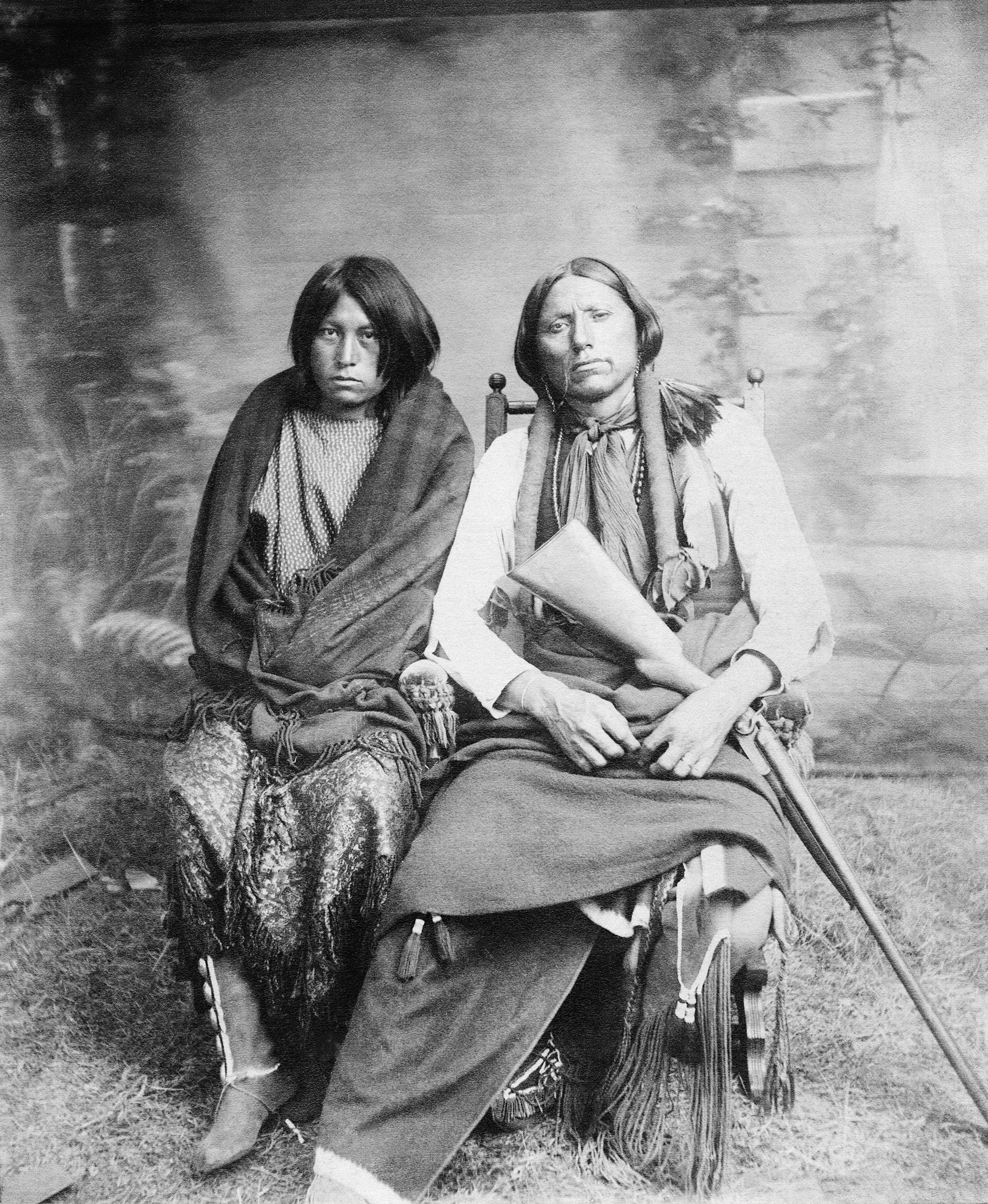
Quanah Parker, the last war chief of the Comanche, and one of his wives in 1888

When the United States annexed Texas in 1845, it negotiated a treaty with the Comanches and other Texas tribes to replace the Texas treaty of the previous year. This was done in May 1846 on the upper Brazos River (Butler-Lewis Treaty). Signed by the Penateka/Hois Comanches, Ioni, Anadarko, Caddo, Lipan Apache, Wichita, and Waco), the treaty promised, besides peace and friendship, trading posts, a visit by a Comanche delegation to Washington, D.C., and a one-time payment of $18,000 in goods. A boundary line between Comancheria and Texas was alluded to, but not defined.

The Comanche delegation went east shortly afterwards and met President James K. Polk, but with the Mexican War just beginning, Congress had more important concerns, and the Senate adjourned without ratifying the treaty. By the time the treaty was amended and ratified in March 1847, the Comanches were certain they had been betrayed. War was averted only when traders and Indian agents advanced credit to send part of the promised gifts. When the amendments were read to the Comanches, the meeting almost ended, but eventually they agreed to the changes. Additional money was appropriated for more gifts, but once again, a boundary line was never established.

Meanwhile, there was a serious question over whose responsibility it was to deal with the Texas tribes, the federal or the state government. The problem was not settled until after the Civil War. In the interim, policy was set by both, and this was confusing, so the 1846 peace treaty brought very little peace to Texas.

In May 1847, Texas allowed the German settlers near Fredericksburg and New Braunfels to make their own treaty with the Texas Comanches. In exchange for land, the Germans promised a trading post and gifts. Unfortunately, the Germans not only encroached beyond the agreed boundary, but were slow to pay, and in response the Comanches made raids. A boundary line was eventually set by the Texas governor but was to be enforced by the American army which had taken over the line of Texas forts on the frontier. Army commanders felt they had no authority to enforce state laws, and meanwhile, Texas continued to operate its ranger companies, which were not under federal control, as military units. The Rangers did nothing to prevent encroachment on Comanche lands but would retaliate if the new settlements beyond the line were attacked. To make matters worse, only the Penateka had signed the 1846 treaty. The Nokoni, Tenawa, and other Comanches did not consider themselves bound by the agreement and continued to raid in Texas.

On the other side of Comancheria, many things had changed with the beginning of the Mexican War in 1846. An American army under General Stephen W. Kearny seized Santa Fé and moved on to California. The Santa Fé Trail became a heavily-travelled military supply route, and forts were built to protect it. Five companies of Missouri volunteers were sent to garrison these posts during the summer of 1847 and quickly became engaged in fights with Plains Indians. At least one of these at Fort Mann involved the Pawnee. In the other cases, the fights were probably with Kiowa, Cheyenne, and Arapaho, and the amount of Comanche involvement is uncertain.

The first part of 1848 was relatively calm, and during that year, Texas Comanches even provided guides for the survey of the route of the new Butterfield (California) trail across southern Texas to El Paso and California. The calm changed suddenly with the California Gold Rush. As thousands of gold-seekers raced west, they needed horses, and the Comanches moved to meet this new demand. Horse raids increased in Texas, but the major target was northern Mexico. Comanche raids struck deep into Coahuila, Chihuahua, Sonora, and Durango, reaching their peak during 1852 when they struck Tepic, then in Jalisco, 700 miles (1,100 km) south of the border at El Paso. To protect the immigrant routes across the plains, the United States called the "Peace on the Plains" conference at Fort Laramie (Wyoming) in 1851. This was an attempt to end, or at least limit, intertribal warfare by defining boundaries between tribal territories.

Almost every plains tribe attended and signed the 1851 Fort Laramie Treaty, and received gifts. The Comanches and Kiowa did not attend. A smallpox epidemic had broken out in their villages, and there was a deep distrust of the northern tribes. Since the Santa Fé Trail was a vital route, it was essential to reach an agreement with them. As the southern Plains tribes gathered around Fort Atkinson for the distribution of the annuities from the Fort Laramie treaty, large groups of Kiowa and Comanches also came, and they were not in a good mood.

Eventually, 6,000 to 9,000 Indians were gathered in the vicinity, and the situation was becoming dangerous. The American agent took it upon himself to distribute $9,000 in gifts to the Comanches and Kiowa, and in 1853 the Kiowa and Yamparika signed their own treaty at Fort Atkinson. In return for safe passage and a promise to stop raiding in Mexico, the United States agreed to pay those tribes $18,000 per year for ten years.

There were several reasons the Comanches and Kiowas had been angry in 1852. The first was they had recently been devastated by epidemics of smallpox and cholera. Their first experience with smallpox had been an epidemic (1780–81) so severe that it caused the disappearance of some Comanche divisions. The Comanche were hit again by smallpox during the winter of 1816–17. The wave of immigration from the California Gold Rush first brought smallpox (1848) and then cholera (1849) to the Great Plains. These were devastating to every plains tribe, but especially to the Comanches and Kiowa. The government census estimated a drop in the Comanches' 1849 population of 20,000 to 12,000 by 1851, and the Comanches never recovered from this loss. Smallpox struck again from New Mexico during 1862 and is believed to have been equally devastating. Cholera returned in 1867. By 1870, the Comanches numbered less than 8,000, and their numbers were still dropping rapidly.

The Comanches kept their promise for safe passage on the Santa Fe Trail, but remained angry about events in Texas where white settlers continued to encroach deeper and deeper into Comancheria and the Texas Rangers were still attacking them. As the frontier advanced, the American army built a new line of forts; when it advanced further, a third line was built. At first these outposts had been garrisoned almost entirely with infantry, allowing the Comanche to simply bypass them. Within a few years however, the infantry was replaced by new light-cavalry regiments. In all, it took three lines of forts and most of the army's pre-Civil War strength to keep the Comanches in Texas in check.

Even more aggravating from the Comanches' point of view were posts like Fort Stockton at Comanche Springs, which were intended to block the "Great Comanche War Trail" leading to northern Mexico. The Americans were required by the Treaty of Guadalupe Hidalgo to prevent raids into Mexico. Between 1848 and 1853, Mexico filed 366 separate claims for Comanche and Apache raids originating from north of the border.

Not all efforts to deal with the Texas Comanches were limited to military force. In 1854 the Texas legislature provided 23,000 acres (93 km²) for the United States to established three reservations on the upper Brazos River for the Texas tribes. Besides Caddo, Delaware, Wichita, and Tonkawa, the United States Indian agent, Robert Neighbors, convinced some Penateka Comanche to move to these locations. Camp Cooper (commanded in 1856 by LTC Robert E. Lee) was built nearby. Almost immediately, local settlers began to accuse the reservation tribes of stealing horses and other depredations. Many of these accusations were either exaggerations, lies, or referred to raids by Comanches from the Staked Plains. The situation became dangerous in 1858 after the army abandoned Camp Cooper.

Texas urged the army to make greater efforts against Comanches beyond its borders after the Texas Rangers discovered that bands of Kiowa and Comanche were using the Indian Territory in Oklahoma, as a sanctuary from which to raid into Texas and then elude pursuit after. Between 1858 and 1860, the army's new light-cavalry regiments were used for an offensive against Comanches in Oklahoma. In May, 1858 Colonel John Ford's Texas Rangers, ignoring the state-line, attacked a Comanche village on Little Robe Creek. Three months later his Caddo, Delaware, and Tonkawa scouts were expelled from Texas as undesirables. In October, 1858 Captain Earl Van Dorn attacked a Comanche village at Rush Springs killing 83. The following May, Van Dorn struck the Comanches at Crooked Creek in Kansas.

The result of this offensive by the army and Rangers was to cause trouble elsewhere. Attacked from Texas, Comanches and Kiowa separated into small bands and moved north near the Santa Fe Trail. In response to increased Indian attacks on the trail during the summer of 1860, three columns of cavalry were sent into the area on a punitive expedition. In July, the command of Captain Samuel D. Sturgis made a major contact. After an eight-day chase, he fought a battle with Kiowa, Cheyenne, Arapaho, and, presumably, some Comanches.

During the spring of 1859, a mob of 250 settlers attacked the reservation, but were repulsed. As Neighbors was hated by local Texans, rather than continue to fight them, he arranged to close the reservations and move the residents to Indian Territory. The peaceful Penateka were forced to leave Texas, along with tribes that had never fought Texans, including the Tonkawa, Caddo, and Delaware, who had served loyally as scouts for the Texas Rangers. After leaving his charges at the new Wichita agency at Anadarko, Neighbors started back to his home in Texas but never made it, near Belknap, he was ambushed and shot in the back.

When federal soldiers withdrew from the region entirely following the outbreak of the Civil War, Confederate troops initially replaced them. Albert Pike, the newly appointed Indian Agent for the Confederate States of America, signed two treaties with Comanches in August, 1861; one with the Penateka, and a second with the Nokoni, Yamparika, Tenawa, and Kotsoteka. Besides the usual promises of peace and friendship, the Comanches were promised a large amount of goods and services. Because the Confederacy needed every cent it had to fight the war, the Comanches never received what was promised. For the same reasons, Texas had to send most of its men and soldiers east to fight against the Union, as a result, most of the federal forts and outposts that had held the Comanche at bay for a generation could no longer be manned and were abandoned. With the frontier unguarded and the Confederate treaty promises unfulfilled, Comanches began raids intended to drive settlement back. The Texas frontier retreated over 100 miles (160 km) during the Civil War, and northern Mexico was hit by a new wave of Comanche raids.

The war also provided the Comanches with an opportunity to seek revenge against the Tonkawa. The Comanche disdained the Tonkawa for their prior service as scouts with the Texas Rangers; but the Texas Comanches had a special hatred for the Tonkawa ever since they had killed and eaten the brother of one of their chiefs. The Comanches were not a gentle people, but they found cannibalism repulsive.

After Texas Indian agents had taken over administration of the Wichita Agency in Oklahoma, Comanches participated in an attack on the agency (October, 1862) by pro-Union Delaware and Shawnee from Kansas. When it was over, 300 Tonkawa had been massacred. The survivors crossed the Red River and settled near Fort Griffin. In the years following, they would exact their revenge by serving as army scouts against the Comanches.

After 1861, Comanches, Kiowa, Cheyenne and Arapaho almost succeeded in closing the Santa Fé Trail. When federal officials at Fort Wise learned the Comanches had signed treaties with the Confederacy, they were certain that they had become hostile. While the rest of the nation was bleeding itself to death on eastern battlefields, the ranks of the Union army on the frontier were filled with men who were unemployed, did not wish to fight in the war, and hated Indians. By the fall of 1863, the performance of these "soldiers" had provoked a general alliance between the Lakota, Cheyenne, Arapaho, Kiowa, Comanches, and Kiowa-Apache.

In the autumn of 1864, Colonel Kit Carson was sent at the head of a column from Fort Bascom, New Mexico into the Staked Plains to chastise the Comanches and Kiowa. His Jicarilla and Ute scouts located their camps on November 24. Carson had found more Comanches and Kiowa than he could chastise, and the First Battle of Adobe Walls came very close to being "Carson's Last Stand." Only the skillful use of artillery kept the Yamparika and Kiowa from massing and overrunning his position. Afterwards, Carson returned to New Mexico and left the chastising of Comanches to others.

In the final days of the Civil War, the Confederacy made a final attempt to exploit the hostility of the plains tribes that had been provoked by the federal volunteers. In May, 1865 a council was held on the Washita River in western Oklahoma. It was well attended by the Comanches and other tribes, but Robert E. Lee had surrendered in Virginia two-weeks prior, effectively ending any hope for the continuation of the Confederacy.

That summer, while the Union celebrated its victory, the plains were in turmoil. The Santa Fé and Overland trails were closed, and virtually every plains tribe was at war with the United States. As federal troops began to re-occupy their posts in Texas, the Great Plains and Indian Territory, government commissioners met with the plains tribes in October on the Little Arkansas River near Wichita to arrange a peace. The Little Arkansas Treaty of 1865 gave the Comanches and Kiowa western Oklahoma, the entire Texas Panhandle, and promised annuities of $15 per person for forty years.

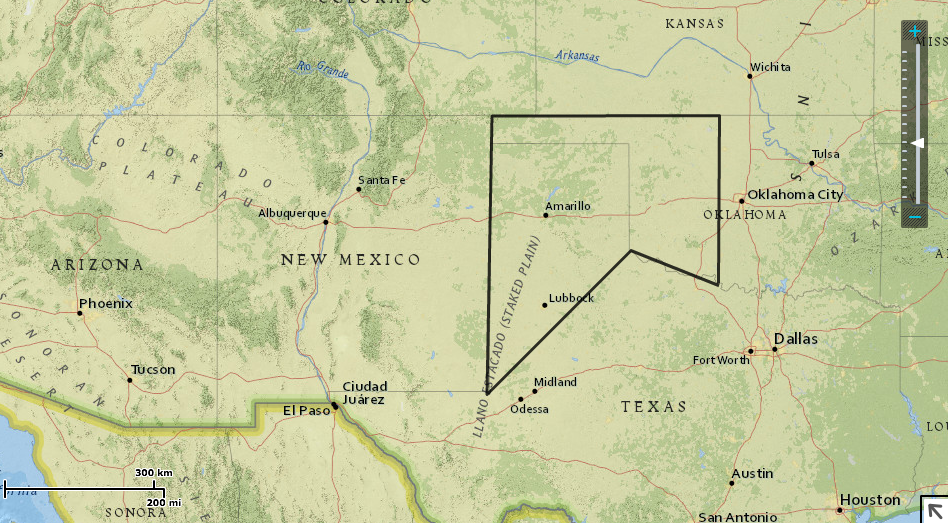
In the treaty of 1865 the Comanche, Kiowa, and Kiowa-Apache ceded most of Comancheria to the United States, but retained the lands shown on this map.

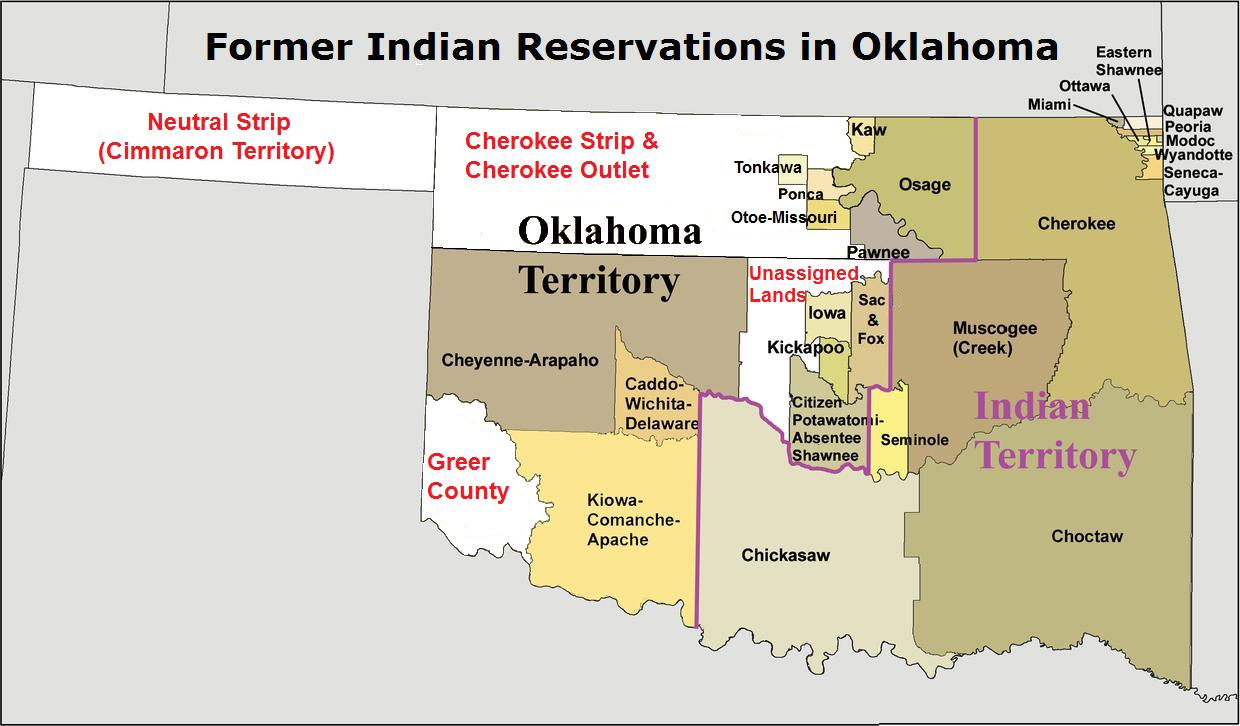
By 1875 all the Comanche were resident on a reservation in Oklahoma.

Of the Comanche divisions, only the Yamparika, Nokoni, Penateka, and Tenewa were parties to the agreement; the Kwahada and Kotsoteka were not. The Kiowa-Apache did not sign the Comanche-Kiowa version but asked to be included under the Cheyenne-Arapaho treaty. This served as an indication of how unstable the situation was. When the annuities arrived, there was widespread disappointment. The Comanches had expected guns, ammunition, and quality goods; what they got were rotten civil war rations and cheap blankets that fell apart in the rain. The peace was soon violated by both sides, and war resumed for another two years. It was a bitter struggle, and General William Sherman finally ordered the army not to pay ransom for white captives held by Indians to avoid giving them incentive for further kidnappings.

While the army was making its own plans to deal with the hostiles by force, the federal government decided to make one final effort to resolve the conflict through treaty. The result was a milestone peace conference held at Medicine Lodge Creek in southern Kansas (October, 1867). In exchange for a wagon train of gifts brought by the commissioners and the payment of annual annuities, the Comanches and Kiowa signed the Medicine Lodge Treaty exchanging Comancheria for a 3 million acre (12,000 km²) reservation in southwestern Oklahoma. The arrangement did not work as intended. Because of an outbreak of cholera in their camps, the Kwahada neither attended the conference nor signed the treaty. Afterwards, they did not consider themselves bound by the Medicine Lodge Treaty, and chose to remain on the Staked Plains.

Most of the other Comanches moved to the vicinity of Fort Cobb and remained on the reservation for the winter, but since the treaty was not yet ratified, there was no money to pay for rations. After a starvation winter, most of the Comanches and Kiowa at Fort Cobb chose to return to the plains in the summer of 1868. Once again raids were made into Texas and Kansas, and the new reservation was used as a sanctuary to prevent pursuit by the army. Even Fort Dodge was attacked, and its horses stolen. The frustrated Indian agent at Fort Cobb resigned and went east, leaving the mess in the hands of his assistant.

The treaty was ratified in July, and funds were made available, but the responsibility for the administration of annuities was placed with the army. After all tribes were ordered to report to Fort Cobb or be considered hostile, General Philip Sheridan set plans in motion for the winter campaign of 1868–69 against the hostiles in western Oklahoma and the Staked Plains. LTC George Custer and the 7th Cavalry attacked a southern Cheyenne village on the Washita River in November, and Major Andrew Evans struck a Comanche village at Soldiers Spring on Christmas Day. Afterwards, most of the Comanches and other tribes still on the plains returned to the agencies.

In March, 1869 the Comanche-Kiowa agency was relocated to Fort Sill and the Cheyenne-Arapaho agency to Darlington. Only the Kwahada were still on the Staked Plains. The Kiowa and other Comanches were on the reservation, but by the fall of 1869 small war parties were occasionally leaving to raid in Texas. During one of these raids near Jacksboro in May, 1871, the Kiowa almost killed William Tecumseh Sherman, commanding general of the United States army. "Great Warrior" Sherman was conducting an inspection tour of western posts, when a Kiowa war party noticed his lone ambulance and small escort. They chose instead to attack a nearby supply train. When Sherman learned of his narrow escape, he was furious and proceeded directly to Fort Sill. When he discovered the Kiowa chiefs were openly bragging about the latest raid, he ordered their arrest and sent them to Texas for trial. After a Texas court sentenced them to life imprisonment, the Comanches and Kiowa launched a series of retaliatory raids that killed more than 20 Texans in 1872. At the same time, Texas civilians stole 1,900 horses from the tribes at Fort Sill.

Meanwhile, the army in Texas was trying to deal with the raids from the reservation and massive thefts of Texas cattle by the Kwahada for sale to New Mexico Comancheros. In October, 1871 a raid led by Quanah Parker stole seventy horses from the army at Rock Station. The commanding officer, Colonel Ranald S. Mackenzie, did not take this lightly. For the next two years, Mackenzie and his black cavalry troopers ranged the Staked Plains chasing the Kwahada. The campaign ended with an attack on a Comanche village at McClellan Creek (September, 1872). Mackenzie captured 130 women and children and held them hostage at Fort Concho. This slowed the raiding while the Comanches negotiated for their release. In April, 1873 they were released and sent under escort to Fort Sill. A detour had to be made around Jacksboro to prevent a riot. At the request of the Secretary of the Interior, Texas Governor Edmund J. Davis paroled the Kiowa chiefs in October after they had served only two years on the condition that the raiding stop. The Kiowa were grateful, but an occasional war party still slipped off the reservation, crossed the Red River, and headed south into Texas.

=== Buffalo hunting ===
Meanwhile, the great slaughter of the plains buffalo had begun. Between 1865 and 1875, the number of buffalo on the Great Plains fell from fifteen million to less than one million. Unofficially sanctioned by army commanders who issued free ammunition to hunters, it destroyed the basis for the plains tribes' way of life. During the winter of 1873–74, Cheyenne hunters returned to the Darlington agency to report that Kansas buffalo hunters were destroying the southern buffalo herds. As this news spread, violence erupted at the Darlington and Wichita agencies, which had to be put down by troops. Afterwards, large groups of Cheyenne left the reservation and headed for the plains. At first the Comanches and Kiowa thought the Cheyenne were mistaken, but their story of the plains littered with dead buffalo was eventually confirmed.

=== Second Battle of Adobe Walls ===
In December, the government decided to deal harshly with the Kiowa and Comanches to end the raids in Texas. The agent at Fort Sill was ordered to limit rations and suspend the distribution of ammunition. A sense of general panic set in, and by May several groups of Comanches and Kiowa had left the reservation. At first they were uncertain what to do. Several Comanches had recently been killed in Texas by Tonkawa scouts, and some of the first thoughts were of revenge. However, the agent had learned of their departure and purpose and had alerted the army.

After some discussion, a decision was made to attack the buffalo hunters on the Staked Plains. In June, 1874 a large Comanche-Cheyenne war party attacked twenty-three buffalo hunters camped in the Texas Panhandle at the site of Carson's 1864 battle at Adobe Walls. The Second Battle of Adobe Walls marked the beginning of the Buffalo War (or Red River War) (1874–75), the last great Indian war on the southern plains. After the initial rush failed, the Comanches came under fire from the hunters' long-range buffalo guns and were forced to retire. The uprising spread rapidly as more warriors left the agencies and joined the hostiles on the Staked Plains. To halt this, soldiers began to disarm the Comanches and Kiowa who had remained on the agencies. In August, groups of Penateka were peacefully drawing rations at the Wichita agency when soldiers stationed at the agency demanded they surrender their weapons. When this was refused, a fight broke out and the Comanches fled, but the agency was under siege for the next two days until it was relieved by troops from Fort Sill.

By September only 500 Kiowa and Comanche were still on the reservation; the others were out on the Staked Plains. That same month the army began to move. Three converging columns moved into the heart of the Staked Plains. Trapped between them, the Comanches, Kiowa, and Cheyenne had little rest. Colonel Nelson A. Miles' column made the first contact and defeated a group of Cheyenne near McClellan Creek. For the Comanches, Cheyenne, and Kiowa, the major blow occurred when Mackenzie located a mixed camp hidden in Palo Duro Canyon (September 26–27). After driving off the warriors during a short battle on September 28, he burned the camp and killed 2,000 captured horses.

There were few other encounters, but the relentless pressure and pursuit throughout the fall and winter had its effect. Starving, the remaining Comanches, Kiowa, and Cheyenne began to return to the agencies, mostly on foot because they had been forced to eat their horses. By December there were 900 on the Fort Sill reservation. In April, 200 Kwahada, who had never submitted, surrendered at Fort Sill. In June the last 400 Kwahada, including Isatai'i and Quanah Parker, surrendered. The war was over. Mackenzie disposed of many of the Comanche and Kiowa horses. After giving 100 to his Tonkawa scouts, he sold 1,600 horses and mules for $22,000. The proceeds were used to buy sheep and goats for his former enemies.

By 1879, the buffalo were gone. That year, the Kiowa-Comanche and Wichita agencies were merged into a single agency. Always pragmatic, the Comanches adjusted, but in typical Comanche style. Taking advantage of his Texas heritage, Quanah Parker emerged as an important Comanche leader. He collected tolls on cattle herds that used the Chisholm Trail to cross the reservation and sold grazing rights to nearby Texas ranchers. Few argued with him about price. With his five wives he moved into a large comfortable house, called the "Star House." It had eight large stars painted on the roof to insure he had more stars than any U.S. army general. He was elected a sheriff and served as a tribal judge. By the time he rode in Theodore Roosevelt's inaugural parade in 1905, Quanah had amassed 100 horses, 1,000 cattle, and 250 acres (1.0 km^{2}) of cultivated farmland.

== Population history ==
In 1832 Comanche chiefs told George Catlin that the tribe numbered up to 40,000 people, being able to muster up to 8,000 warriors. This high population appears to be confirmed by Bourgmont who was told by a Comanche chief that the tribe consisted of 12 villages and when Bourgmont visited one of those villages, he found there 800 warriors (if every other village was equally populous, the total number of warriors would be 9,600). In 1774 a French trader, J. Gaignard, wrote that one division of the Comanche (the Naytane, also known as Yamparika) had 4,000 warriors divided into four bands which were never together. In 1786 Spaniards estimated that the Comanches may have numbered up to 30,000. Jedidiah Morse around year 1820 estimated the Comanche at between 38,000 and 41,000. In 1819 three bands of the Comanche were reported as 2,500 warriors. Indian Affairs 1837 reported 19,200 people. Charles Bent in 1847 reported that they had 2,500 lodges. Indian Affairs 1849 reported them as 4,000 warriors and 20,000 total population. Around the middle of the 19th century A. W. Whipple, E. Domenech and H. Howe all reported that the Comanche numbered up to 30,000 people.

The Comanche population apparently rapidly declined in the second half of the 19th century. The census of 1890 found only 1,598 in Oklahoma. According to Indian Affairs there were 1,507 (in 1895), 1,499 (in 1900), 1401 (in 1905) and 1,476 (in 1910).

Comanche population has rebounded in the 20th and 21st centuries. The census of 2020 found 28,193 Comanches in the USA.

== Footnotes ==
=== References ===
- Hamalainen, Pekka (2008). The Comanche Empire. New Haven: Yale University Press. ISBN 978-0-300-12654-9.
- Newton, Cody (February 2011). "Towards a Context for Late Precontact Culture Change: Comanche Movement Prior to Eighteenth Century Spanish Documentation". Plains Anthropologist. 56 (217): 55–57, 61. doi:10.1179/pan.2011.006. JSTOR 23057234. S2CID 164194705.
- John, Elizabeth A. H. (1975). Storms Brewed in Other Men's Worlds. Lincoln: University of Nebraska Press. ISBN 0803275544.
- DeLay, Brian (2008). The War of a Thousand Deserts. New Haven: Yale University Press. ISBN 9780300119329.
- Kessell, John L. (2002). Spain in the Southwest. Norman: University of Oklahoma Press. ISBN 0806134070.

job

=== General references ===
- Kavanagh, Thomas W. (1996). Comanche Political History. Lincoln: University of Nebraska Press. ISBN 0803227302.
