= Greenhorn Mountain (disambiguation) =

Greenhorn Mountain or Greenhorn Mountains may refer to:

- Greenhorn Mountain, Colorado
  - Greenhorn Mountain Wilderness, Colorado
- Greenhorn Mountains, California
- Greenhorn Mountains (Oregon)
- Greenhorn Range, Montana
