= Greenhorn Valley =

Valley in Colorado, United States

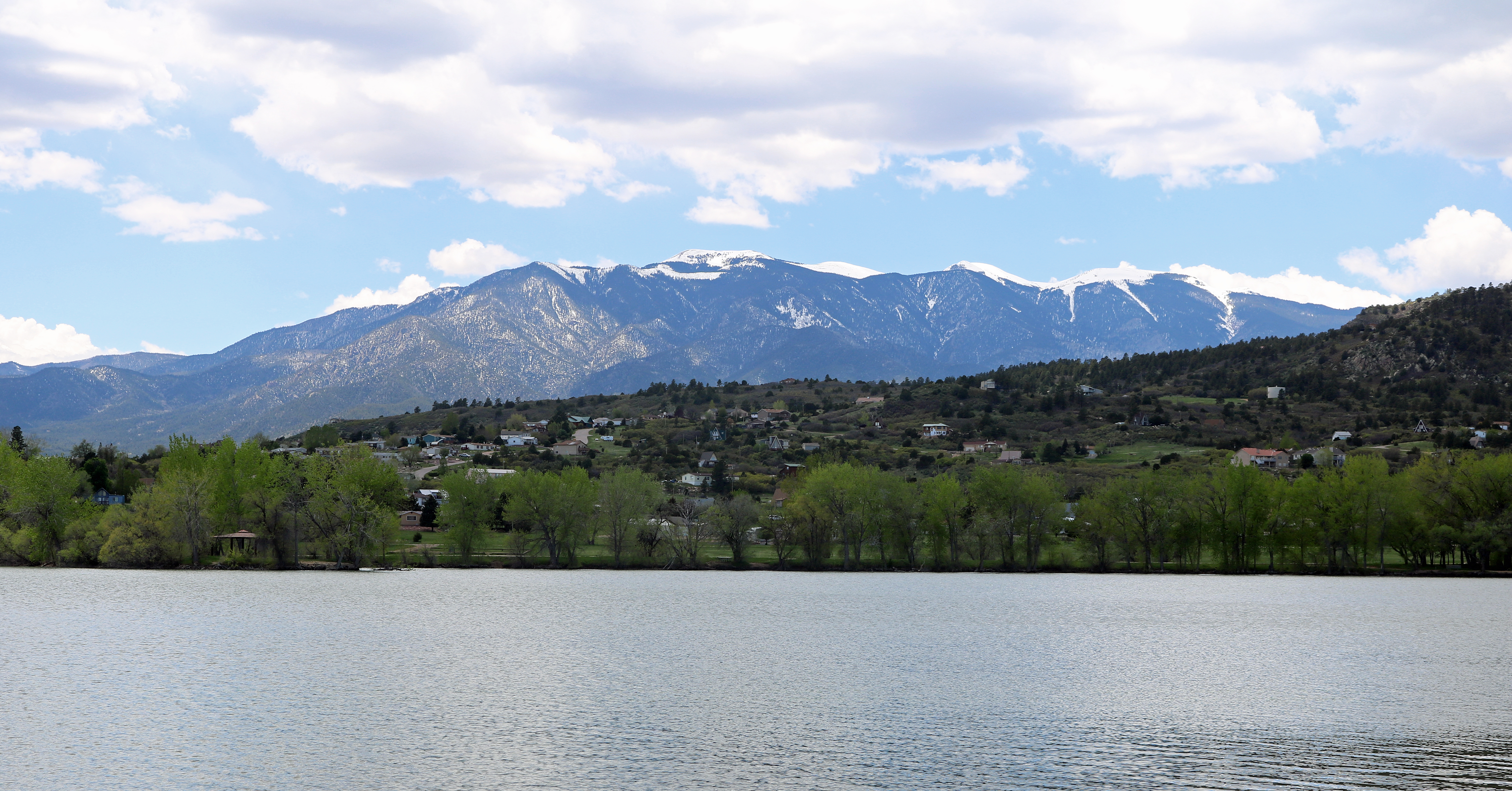
- Looking across Lake Beckwith towards Greenhorn Mountain

- Location within Colorado
- Floor elevation: 1,784 m (5,853 ft)

Geography
- Location: Pueblo County, Colorado
- Country: United States
- Coordinates: 37°56′43″N 104°50′07″W
- Topo map: Colorado City; Rye
- Traversed by: Colorado State Highway 165
- River: Greenhorn Creek
- Interactive map of Greenhorn Valley

The Greenhorn Valley lies in southern Pueblo County, Colorado just east of Greenhorn Mountain. It includes the communities of Colorado City and Rye.

Colorado State Highway 165, part of the Frontier Pathways Scenic Byway, goes through the valley and serves as its main street. Interstate 25 marks the eastern end of the valley.

== Geography ==
The western part of the valley borders the San Isabel National Forest. Lake Beckwith, a reservoir managed by the Colorado City Metropolitan District and also a state wildlife area managed by Colorado Parks and Wildlife, offers fishing, walking, and canoeing. Greenhorn Mountain, the highest peak in the Wet Mountains at 12,346 feet (3,763 meters), overlooks the valley from the west and dominates the view. Greenhorn Creek rises on Greenhorn Mountain and traverses the valley which is situated where the creek leaves the mountains and emerges onto the Great Plains. The valley has an elevation of 6,800 ft (2,100 m) at Rye and 6,000 ft (1,800 m) at Colorado City.

== History ==
The mountain, creek, and valley are named after Cuerno Verde (Greenhorn in English), a Comanche chief and war leader who raided the Spanish settlements in New Mexico. In 1779 he was defeated and killed, in or near Greenhorn valley, by a New Mexican army led by Governor Juan Bautista de Anza.

The Taos Mountain Trail crossed Greenhorn Creek near present-day Colorado City. The first settlement in the valley was in 1845, when mountain man John Brown, his wife Luisa Sandoval, and several children established a trading post where the trail crossed the creek. Brown and his family left Greenwood for California in 1849. In 1853, Lt. Edward Griffin Beckwith, an army officer, said of the valley, "six New Mexican families had built an irrigation system to divert the water from Greenhorn Creek to water their crops of corn, wheat, beans and watermelon. Their homes were built of adobe which stood shoulder to shoulder and were surrounded by a close fence of high pickets. They also had corrals for the safe keeping of their stock."

Estefana (also Estefania) Bent, one of the two daughters of former New Mexico governor Charles Bent, inherited land in the Greenwood Valley and in 1859 moved there with her husband Alexander Hicklin, building a ranch house near where Brown's trading post had been. Hicklin became the first postmaster of the Greenwood Post Office in 1866 and established a stagecoach station in 1867. He died in 1874. Estefana Bent's ownership of the land was disputed in many long-running court battles. Her son, Alexander, was killed by a squatter on the ranch in 1878. She died penniless in 1927.

== Education ==
Greenhorn Valley Schools serves the valley with three schools: Rye Elementary School, Craver Middle School, and Rye High School.
