= Old English (disambiguation) =

Old English was an early form of the English language spoken by Anglo-Saxons until the 12th century.

Old English or Olde English may also refer to:

== Arts and entertainment ==
- Olde English (sketch comedy), an American comedy troupe
- Old English (film), a 1930 American pre-Code drama

== Beverages ==
- A cider from Gaymer Cider Company
- Olde English 800, an American malt liquor

== Language and typography ==
- Early Modern English, the language of Shakespeare and the King James Bible, sometimes referred to colloquially as old English
- Old English, a style of handwriting or typeface, also known as Blackletter

== Peoples ==
- Old English (Ireland), 12th-century settlers from England
- Anglo-Saxons, 5th-century invaders of Britain

== Other uses ==
- A furniture polish and wood care product manufactured by Reckitt Benckiser

== See also ==
- History of the English language
- Anglo-Saxon England
- Anglo-Saxon (disambiguation)
- New English (disambiguation)
