= Colorado City, Colorado =

Unincorporated community in Colorado, US

- Census-designated place
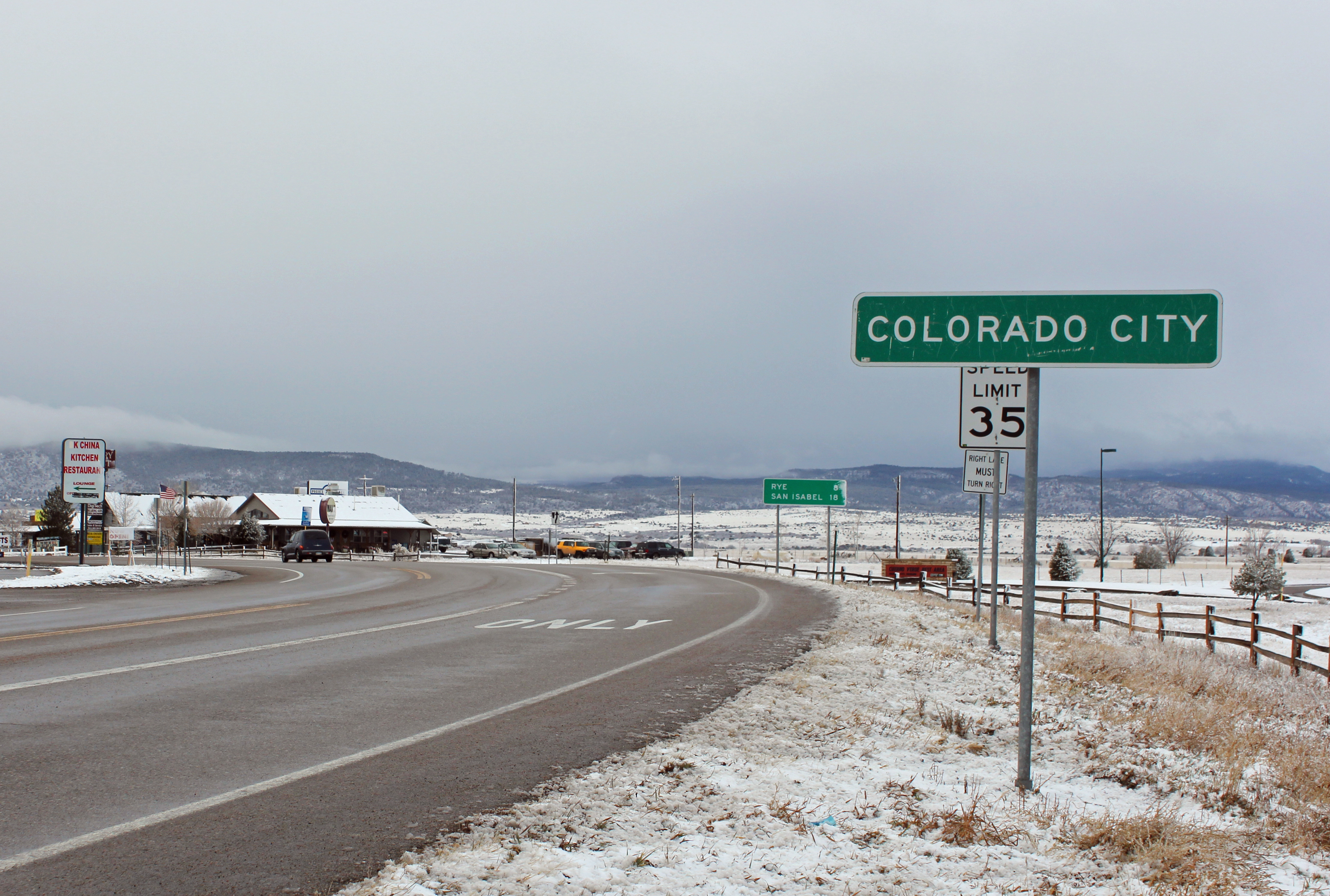
- Entering Colorado City along Colorado State Highway 165, December 2014

- Location of Colorado City in Pueblo County
- Coordinates: 37°55′30″N 104°51′45″W
- Country: United States
- State: Colorado
- County: Pueblo

Government
  - Type: Unincorporated community
  - Body: Pueblo County

Area
  - Total: 15.070 sq mi (39.030 km^{2})
  - Land: 14.956 sq mi (38.735 km^{2})
  - Water: 0.114 sq mi (0.295 km^{2})
- Elevation: 5,853 ft (1,784 m)

Population (2020)
  - Total: 2,237
  - Density: 149.6/sq mi (57.75/km^{2})
- Time zone: UTC−07:00 (MST)
  - Summer (DST): UTC−06:00 (MDT)
- ZIP code: 81019
- Area code: 719
- GNIS CDP ID: 2407647
- FIPS code: FIPS 08 15935
- Website: www.colorado.gov/coloradocitymetro

Colorado City is an unincorporated community and a census-designated place (CDP) in Pueblo County, Colorado, United States. The CDP is a part of the Pueblo, CO Metropolitan Statistical Area. The Colorado City post office has the ZIP Code 81019 (post office boxes). At the United States Census 2020, the CDP population was 2,237. The Colorado City Metropolitan District provides services.

== History ==
The first settlement at the site of Colorado City was called Greenhorn after the name of an 18th-century Comanche chief (Cuerno Verde in Spanish). In 1845, mountain man John Brown, his wife Luisa Sandoval, and several children established a trading post where the Trapper's Trail to Taos, New Mexico crossed Greenhorn Creek. Brown and his family left Greenhorn for California in 1849. In 1853, Lt. Edward Griffin Beckwith, an army officer, said of Greenhorn, "six New Mexican families had built an irrigation system to divert the water from Greenhorn Creek to water their crops of corn, wheat, beans and watermelon. Their homes were built of adobe which stood shoulder to shoulder and were surrounded by a close fence of high pickets. They also had corrals for the safe keeping of their stock."

The Greenhorn, Colorado Territory, post office operated from December 10, 1866, until December 15, 1911. The Colorado City, Colorado, post office opened on September 1, 1964.

Old Colorado City in Colorado Springs used to be Colorado City but was later renamed.

== Geography ==
Colorado City is located in the Greenhorn Valley.

The CDP has an area of 9,645 acres (39.030 km^{2}), including 73 acres (0.295 km^{2}) of water.

== Demographics ==
Colorado City CDP, Colorado
Year	Pop.	±%
1990	1,149	—
2000	2,018	+75.6%
2010	2,193	+8.7%
2020	2,237	+2.0%
Source: United States Census Bureau

=== 2020 census ===
As of the 2020 census, Colorado City had a population of 2,237. The median age was 48.8 years. 20.9% of residents were under the age of 18 and 26.5% were 65 years of age or older. For every 100 females, there were 99.2 males, and for every 100 females age 18 and over, there were 96.9 males age 18 and over.

0.0% of residents lived in urban areas, while 100.0% lived in rural areas.

There were 944 households in Colorado City, of which 22.8% had children under the age of 18 living in them. Of all households, 53.9% were married-couple households, 16.9% were households with a male householder and no spouse or partner present, and 24.3% were households with a female householder and no spouse or partner present. About 28.8% of all households were made up of individuals, and 17.8% had someone living alone who was 65 years of age or older.

There were 1,027 housing units, of which 8.1% were vacant. The homeowner vacancy rate was 1.6%, and the rental vacancy rate was 9.4%.

Racial composition as of the 2020 census
Race	Number	Percent
White	1,926	86.1%
Black or African American	13	0.6%
American Indian and Alaska Native	30	1.3%
Asian	5	0.2%
Native Hawaiian and Other Pacific Islander	0	0.0%
Some other race	59	2.6%
Two or more races	204	9.1%
Hispanic or Latino (of any race)	299	13.4%

=== 2000 census ===
As of the census of 2000, there were 2,018 people, 760 households, and 582 families residing in the CDP. The population density was 58.5 inhabitants per square mile (22.6/km^{2}). There were 845 housing units at an average density of 24.5 per square mile (9.5/km^{2}). The racial makeup of the CDP was 92.57% White, 0.99% African American, 1.88% Native American, 0.20% Asian, 0.05% Pacific Islander, 2.38% from other races, and 1.93% from two or more races. Hispanic or Latino of any race were 9.17% of the population.

There were 760 households, out of which 36.1% had children under the age of 18 living with them, 64.7% were married couples living together, 8.7% had a female householder with no husband present, and 23.4% were non-families. 18.9% of all households were made up of individuals, and 7.4% had someone living alone who was 65 years of age or older. The average household size was 2.66 and the average family size was 3.04.

In the CDP, the population was spread out, with 28.9% under the age of 18, 6.8% from 18 to 24, 26.8% from 25 to 44, 25.4% from 45 to 64, and 12.0% who were 65 years of age or older. The median age was 37 years. For every 100 females, there were 99.2 males. For every 100 females age 18 and over, there were 92.6 males.

The median income for a household in the CDP was $37,331, and the median income for a family was $44,758. Males had a median income of $32,396 versus $21,000 for females. The per capita income for the CDP was $17,247. About 5.7% of families and 8.9% of the population were below the poverty line, including 7.8% of those under age 18 and 8.9% of those age 65 or over.

The United States Census Bureau initially defined the Colorado City CDP for the 1990 United States census.

== Government ==
The Colorado City public library, May 2015

Colorado City is a metropolitan district, a type of special district established under Colorado law. It is governed by an elected, five-member board of directors and managed by an appointed district manager.

The metropolitan district operates Lake Beckwith, which provides recreational opportunities for residents and visitors. The lake also forms the Lake Beckwith State Wildlife Area, one of several hundred state wildlife areas in Colorado managed by Colorado Parks and Wildlife. Colorado City also has a public golf course and club house.

== Infrastructure ==
=== Transportation ===
Colorado City is part of Colorado's Bustang network. It is on the Trinidad-Pueblo Outrider line.

== Education ==
Colorado City is within the Pueblo County School District. The community is home to Craver Middle School. Rye Elementary School and Rye High School in the neighboring town of Rye serve the students of Colorado City.

== See also ==
- List of census-designated places in Colorado
