= John Brown (mountain man) =

John Brown (December 22, 1817 – April 20, 1889) was an American mountain man and trader in the Arkansas River valley in Colorado in the 1840s. From the 1850s until his death he was a prominent businessman and citizen of San Bernardino, California.

== Early life ==
Brown was born December 22, 1817, in Worcester, Massachusetts. He left home as a teenager and made his way westwards to St. Louis, New Orleans, and Texas. He fought for Texas independence from Mexico in the Battle of San Jacinto in 1836. He spent two years at Fort Leavenworth, Kansas, and by 1841 was in Colorado.

== Colorado ==
In the winter of 1841-1842, George S. Simpson and Robert Fisher founded a settlement called El Pueblo at the site of what would later become Pueblo, Colorado. Brown helped build the trading post which was near the union of Fountain Creek with the Arkansas River. Several independent traders, formerly mountain men, their wives, children, and employees lived at the trading post. The traders were Anglos; their wives or consorts were Hispanics or American Indians. One of the mountain men at the Pueblo was Jim Beckwourth who in 1843 left his wife (likely an informal union) Maria Luisa Sandoval (born about 1825), and daughter Matilda in Pueblo while he journeyed to California. When he returned in 1846 Brown and Sandoval were living together. They would remain together for the rest of their lives. Brown may also have been involved with a woman named Nicolasa and to have killed a Frenchman (or American Indian, accounts differ) called "Seesome" in a duel about her. Nicolasa also inspired two additional duels.

In 1845, Brown and his wife Luisa journeyed from Pueblo 30 miles (48 km) south to Greenhorn Creek, a tributary of the Arkansas River, and established a trading post for travelers where the Trapper's Trail to Taos, New Mexico, crossed Greenhorn Creek. In 1847, traveler George Ruxton described Greenhorn as "one adobe hovel of a more aspiring order" and two or three Indian lodges inhabited by French-Canadian trappers and their Indian wives. Ruxton described a "mountaineer" (probably Brown) he met there as an American who greeted him on horseback, "dressed in deer skin with long fringes on the arms and legs...with a rifle over the horn of his saddle." Brown sold whiskey, grew corn, raised cattle, and engaged Mexican workers to build a grist mill. He spent a good part of his time traveling in search of merchandise and customers, extending his trade as far as Fort Laramie in Wyoming. Luisa managed the trading post while he was away.

== California ==
On June 6, 1849, Brown closed his trading post and he and his family and several more traders and mountain men left the Arkansas Valley to travel by mule train to the gold fields of California, passing through Salt Lake City and arriving at Sutter's Fort on September 1. Enroute, crossing the Sangre de Cristo Mountains near the New Mexico/Colorado border, they were attacked by Jicarilla Apaches, Four men were killed by the Jicarillas. Luisa Brown escaped by jumping her horse over a ravine. She was holding a child in her arms, permanently injuring his neck as she held him tightly.

On arrival in California, Brown and family initially settled as merchants in San Francisco, but he disliked the climate and journeyed with his family to San Bernardino arriving there on May 1, 1852. Brown became a prosperous and prominent citizen of San Bernardino, raising cattle, growing grain, operating toll roads, and delivering mail to mining camps. He was a Justice of the Peace. Brown was also a spiritualist who wrote a book entitled The Mediumistic Experiences of John Brown, the Medium of the Rockies in which he described his psychic experiences.

== Death ==
He died on April 20, 1889. The Spiritualist Society held his funeral. Luisa and ten children survived him.
