= Anglo-Saxon (disambiguation) =

Anglo-Saxons were Germanic tribes that settled in early medieval England.

Anglo-Saxon or Anglo-Saxons may also refer to:

- Old English, the earliest historical form of the English language
- Anglo-Saxon world or Anglosphere, a sphere of influence among Anglophone countries
- English-speaking world, Anglophone regions
- Anglo-Saxon model, a regulated market-based economic model that emerged in the 1970s in the Anglosphere
- Anglo-Saxon race, outdated term for modern descendants of the Anglo-Saxons
- Anglo-Saxons (racialist term), Russian pejorative
- SS Anglo Saxon, any of several ships
- Anglo-Saxon Petroleum, subsidiary company of Royal Dutch Shell
- Anglo Saxon Mine, 19th-century mining camp at Groganville, Shire of Mareeba, Queensland, Australia

== See also ==
- Anglo-Saxon Chronicle, a set of annals in Old English chronicling the history of the Anglo-Saxons
- White Anglo-Saxon Protestant (WASP), sociological term for a historically dominant group in the United States
- Anglo-Saxonism, supremacism of the putative Anglo-Saxon race
- Anglo-Saxon Federation of America, a British Israelite group founded in 1930
- Anglo (disambiguation)
- Saxon (disambiguation)
