= Anglo =

Prefix indicating English origin or relation

Anglo is a prefix indicating a relation to, or descent from England, English culture, the English people or the English language, such as in the term Anglosphere. It is often used alone, somewhat loosely, to refer to people of British descent in Anglo-America, the Anglophone Caribbean, South Africa, Australia, and New Zealand. It is used in Canada to differentiate between Francophone Canadians, located mainly in Quebec but found across Canada, and Anglophone Canadians, also located across Canada, including in Quebec. It is also used in the United States to distinguish the Hispanic and Latino population from the non-Hispanic white majority.

Anglo is a Late Latin prefix used to denote English- in conjunction with another toponym or demonym. The word is derived from Anglia, the Latin name for England and still used in the modern name for its eastern region, East Anglia. It most likely refers to the Angles, a Germanic people originating in the north German peninsula of Angeln, a region of today's Schleswig Holstein. The first recorded use of the word in Latin is in Tactitus's Germania, where he mentions the "Angles" as a Suebian tribe living near the Elbe. Bede writes that the Angles came from a place called Angulus "which lies between the province of the Jutes and the Saxons." Anglia and England both mean land of the English.

Anglo is often used to refer to British in historical and other contexts after the Acts of Union 1707, for example the Anglo-Irish Agreement of 1985 between the United Kingdom and the Republic of Ireland, which established the Anglo-Irish Intergovernmental Conference, a forum made up of officials from the British and Irish governments, and the Anglo-Dutch Treaty of 1824 between the British government and the Dutch, not an English government. Typical examples of this use are also shown below, where non-English people from the British Isles are described as being Anglo.

Anglo is not an easily defined term. For traditionalists, there are linguistic problems with using the word as an adjective or noun on its own. For example, the purpose of the -o ending is to enable the formation of a compound term (for example Anglo-Saxon meaning of English and Saxon origin), so there is only an apparent parallelism between, for example, Latino and Anglo. However, a semantic change has taken place in many English-speaking regions so that in informal usage the meanings listed below are common. The definition is changed in each region which defines how it is identified.

== Specialized usage ==
=== Africa ===
The term Anglo-African has been used historically to self-identify by people of mixed British and African ancestry born in the United States and in Africa. The Anglo-African and The Weekly Anglo-African were the names of newspapers published by African American abolitionist Robert Hamilton (1819–1870) in New York during the American Civil War era. The Anglo-African was also the name of a newspaper published in Lagos (now part of Nigeria) from 1863 to 1865. It was founded and edited by Robert Campbell (1829–1884), a Jamaican born son of a Scottish father and Mulatto mother. The term has also been used historically to describe people living in the British Empire in Africa. The Anglo-African Who's Who and Biographical Sketch-Book published in London in 1905 includes details of prominent British and Afrikaner people in Africa at that time.

=== Australia ===
In Australia, Anglo is used as part of the terms Anglo-Australian and Anglo-Celtic, which refer to the majority of Australians, who are of English, Scottish, Welsh and Irish descent.

=== Canada ===
In Canada, and especially in Canadian French, Anglophone is widely used to designate someone whose mother tongue is English, as opposed to Francophone, which describes someone whose mother tongue is French, and to Allophone, which describes someone whose mother tongue is a language other than English or French. Anglo-Métis is also sometimes used to refer to an ethnic group.

=== Israel ===
Jewish immigrants making Aliyah to the State of Israel are sometimes referred to as Anglos.

=== Scotland ===
In Scotland, and in related cultures, the term Anglo-Scot, sometimes shortened to Anglo or Anglos, is used to refer to people with some permutation of mixed Scottish-English ancestry, association and/or birth; such as English people of Scottish descent, Scottish people of English descent, or heavily Anglicised members of the Scottish nobility who are indistinguishable from English members of the British upper class and speak with a Received Pronunciation, or other elite Southern accent.

A large number of Anglo-Scots have made their mark in the fields of sport, politics, law, diplomacy, the Military history of the United Kingdom, medicine, engineering, technical invention, maritime history, geographical exploration, journalism and on the stage and screen. The London-born writer Ian Fleming being one such example of this mixed ancestry. His James Bond character is the preeminent fictional example of the Anglo-Scot.

The term Anglo-Scot is often used to describe Scottish sports players who are based in England or playing for English teams, or vice versa. This is especially so in football, notably in Rugby union, where the Anglo Scots were a Scottish non-native select provincial District side that competed in the Scottish Inter-District Championship.

=== United States ===
In many parts of the United States, especially those with high Latino populations, the term "Anglo" is applied to white Americans who are not of Latino origin. "Anglo" is short for "Anglo American", is used as a synonym for non-Latino whites; that is European Americans, most of whom speak the English language, even those who are not necessarily of English or British descent.

== See also ==
- Angles (tribe)
- Anglo-Burmese people
- Anglo-Celtic
- Anglo-Indian
- Anglo-Irish people
- Anglo-Norman
- Anglo-Saxon (disambiguation)
- Anglo-Saxons
- Anglo-Scottish border
- Anglophile
- Anglophobia
- Anglosphere
- Second Boer War
- White Anglo-Saxon Protestant
