= New English =

New English may refer to:

- Modern English
- Anglo-Irish people or New English people, settlers in Ireland
- New English (EP), an EP by Ambulance LTD
- New English (mixtape), by Desiigner

== See also ==
- New Englander
- New Englanders
- New England English
- Old English
