= Anglo (disambiguation) =

Anglo is a prefix indicating a relation to, or descent from, the Angles, England, English culture, the English people or the English language.

Anglo may also refer to:

- Anglo (horse), a racehorse
- Anglo American plc, a mining company
- Anglo Irish Bank, an Irish bank
- Sistema Anglo de Ensino, a Brazilian educational system
