= Saint Charles River (Colorado) =

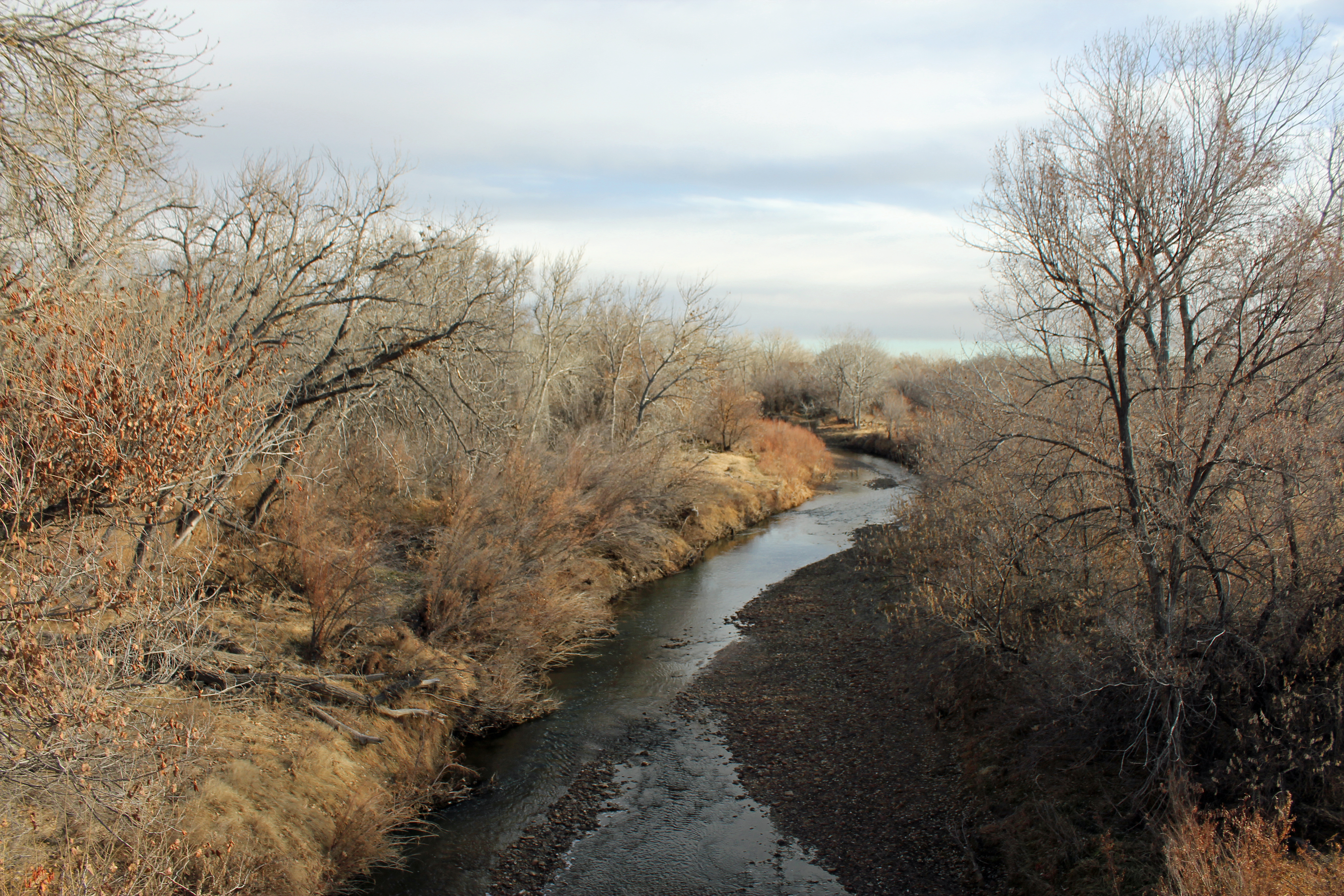
- The river in late 2014, as viewed from a bridge on 27th Lane, southeast of Pueblo.

Physical characteristics
- Source
  - coordinates: 37°59′54″N 105°09′00″W
- Mouth
  - location: Confluence with Arkansas
  - coordinates: 38°15′56″N 104°27′35″W
  - elevation: 4,550 ft (1,390 m)

Basin features
- Progression: Arkansas—Mississippi
- Tributaries
  - right: Greenhorn Creek

Saint Charles River is a 64.6-mile-long (104.0 km) tributary of the Arkansas River that flows from a source near Saint Charles Peak in the Wet Mountains of southern Colorado. It joins the Arkansas east of Pueblo, Colorado.

== See also ==
- List of rivers of Colorado
