= Anglo-Celtic =

Ethnic group predominantly inhabiting the British isles

Anglo-Celtic people are those descended primarily from the peoples of the British Isles: the English, Irish, Scottish, and Welsh. The concept is mainly relevant outside of England, Ireland, Scotland and Wales, particularly in Australia; however, it is also used in Canada, the United States, New Zealand and South Africa, where a significant diaspora is located.

== Origins ==
The term is a combination of the combining form Anglo- and the adjective Celtic. Anglo-, meaning English is derived from the Angles, a Germanic people who settled in Britain (mainly in what is now England) in the middle of the first millennium. The name England (Old English: Engla land or Ængla land) originates from these people. Celtic, in this context, refers to the people of Ireland, Scotland, Wales, Brittany, the Isle of Man and Cornwall.

== Usage ==
Recorded usage dates as far back to at least the mid-19th century. A newspaper of the name, The Anglo-Celt (pronounced in this case as 'Anglo-Selt'), was founded in County Cavan in Ireland in 1846. In an 1869 publication, the term was contrasted with Anglo-Saxon as a more appropriate term for people of English, Irish, Scottish and Welsh descent worldwide:

"Anglo-Saxon," as applied to the modern British people, and Britannic race, I believe every impartial scholar will agree with me in thinking a gross misnomer. For if it can be shown that there is a large Celtic element even in the population of England itself, still more unquestionable is this, not only with regard to the populations the British Isles generally, but also with reference to the English-speaking peoples of America and Australasia. Even the English are rather Anglo-Celts than Anglo-Saxons, and still more certainly is Anglo-Celtic a more accurate term than Anglo-Saxon, not only for that British nationality which includes the Scots, the Irish and the Welsh; but also for that Britannic race, chief elements in the formation of which have been Welsh, Scottish and Irish immigrants.

In Australia, views are mixed about use of the term. Some scholars say it has been encouraged by those of Irish Catholic ancestry as acknowledgement of inclusion in a core Anglo-Celtic Australian identity. Others say it is misleading and a distortion of historic discrimination against an underclass.

The term lends itself to the term Anglo-Celtic Isles, an alternative term for the British Isles. Use in this term can be seen in a 1914 Irish unionist ballad:

The United Anglo-Celtic Isles
Will e'er be blessed by Freedoms smiles
No tyrant can our homes subdue
While Britons to the Celts are true.
The false may clamour to betray
The brave will still uphold our sway
The triple-sacred flag as yet
Supreme, its sun shall never set
— Southern Unionist Ballad (Ennis Unionist, 1914)

== See also ==
- Saint Donnan
- Hiberno-Scottish mission
- British diaspora
- Irish diaspora
- Anglo-Norman (disambiguation)
- Anglo-Saxon
- Anglo-Celt Cup
- White Southerners
