= Cuerno Verde =

Leader of the Comanche in the late 18th century

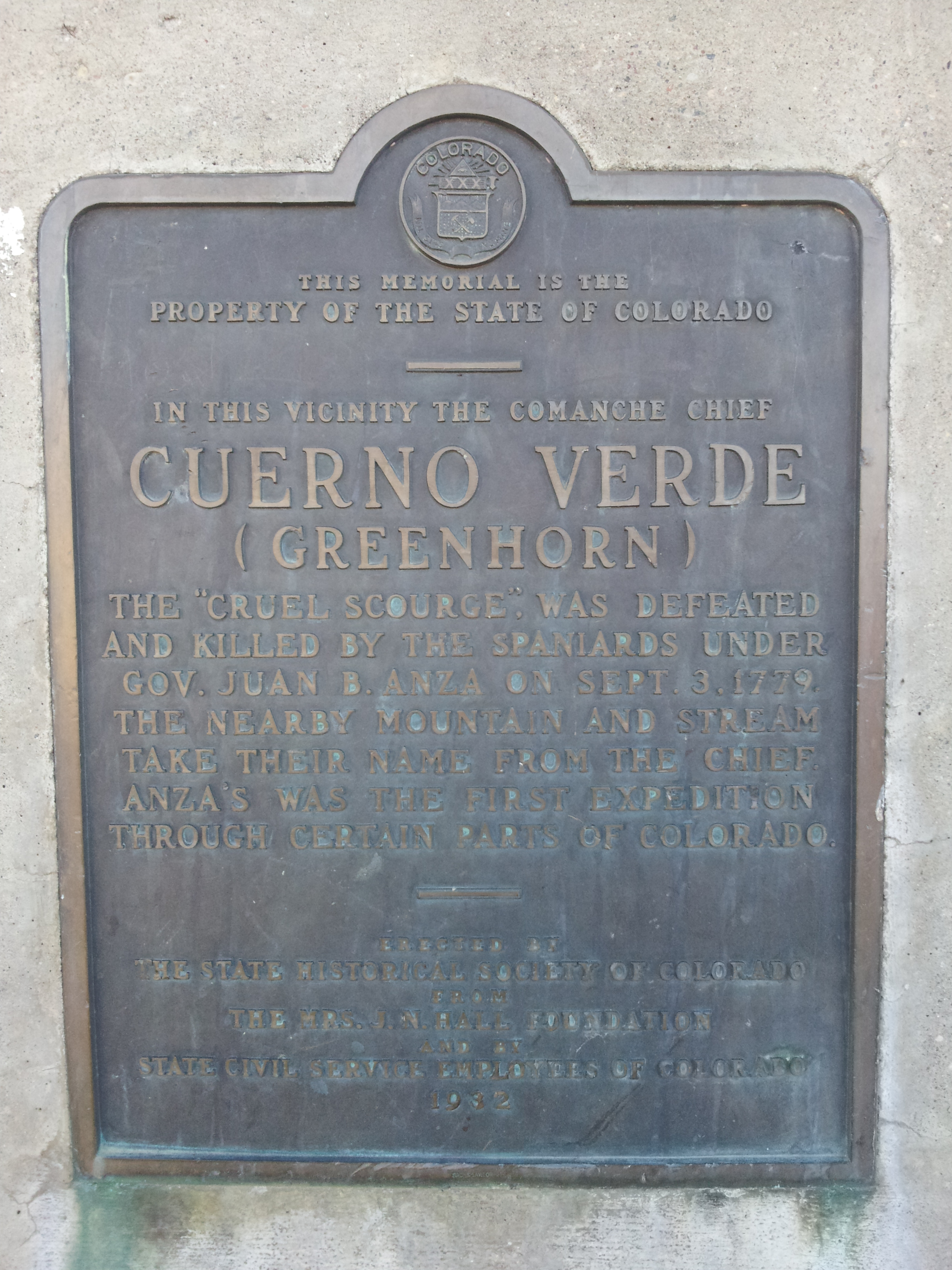
Cuerno Verde marker at Greenhorn Meadows Park on Colorado Highway 165 at Rye, Colorado. Greenhorn Mountain and Greenhorn Creek are named after him. He was killed along the creek just east of Rye.

Cuerno Verde (died September 3, 1779) is the Spanish name for Green Horn aka Tavibo Naritgant, a chief of the Comanche, likely of the Kotsoteka Comanche, in the late 18th century.

== Life ==
Cuerno Verde ("Green Horn" in English), is the Spanish name given to Tavibo Naritgant ("Dangerous Man") because of the green tinted horn(s) that he wore on his headdress in battle. The English translation of the Comanche name is "Dangerous Man." His son inherited both the name and the distinctive headdress from the father, who was killed in combat against the Spanish at Ojo Caliente, in what is now New Mexico, in October 1768.

As a young man, Tabivo Naritgant led a series of successful raids into Nuevo Mexico during the mid- to late 1770s. The Spanish Viceroy in New Spain, Antonio María de Bucareli, uneasy with the looming threat, offered Juan Bautista de Anza the governorship of Nuevo Mexico with instructions to deal with the various local Indians, including Tavibo Naritgant. De Anza moved to Nuevo Mexico and assumed the Governorship and for a year, studied past expeditions against and encounters with Cuerno Verde. A year later, in August 1779, de Anza led a mixed force of 500 to 800 Spanish troops and Ute, Apache, and Pueblo auxiliaries on a punitive expedition against the Comanche, most notably avoiding the usual route from Santa Fe and using the mountains as cover to hide.

The Comanche and Spanish forces met in a series of running battles between August 31 and September 3, 1779; Tabivo Naritgant was killed in combat, along with his first-born son and fifteen others, on September 3 somewhere between the present day cities of Pueblo, Colorado and Colorado City, Colorado, probably in a gully of the St. Charles River. Hostilities in the area decreased following his death.

The "green horn" headdress of Cuerno Verde was taken from the battlefield and presented to the Viceroy by de Anza. It has been reported that the Viceroy presented the headdress to the King of Spain, who in turn presented the headdress to the Pope.

Anza called him a "cruel scourge" and made note in his diaries of atrocities attributed to him. Some modern Comanches question the veracity of Anza's statements while maintaining that Tabivo Naritgant'a warring activities were appropriate for a Comanche leader of the period.

== Legacy ==
Greenhorn Mountain and the Greenhorn Valley in south-central Colorado are named after the English translation of his Spanish name.

== Gallery ==
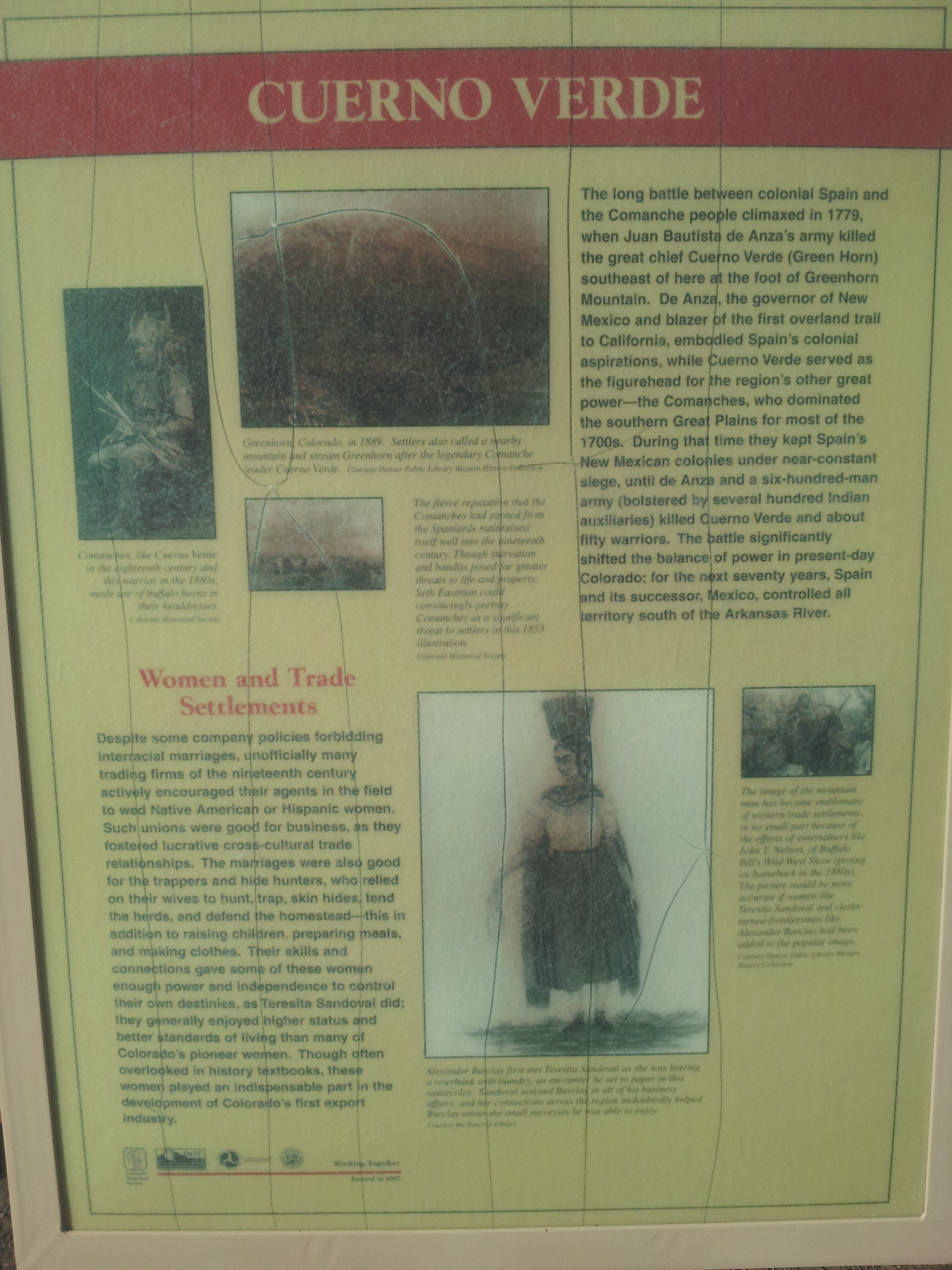
Cuerno Verde marker on Colorado Highway 67

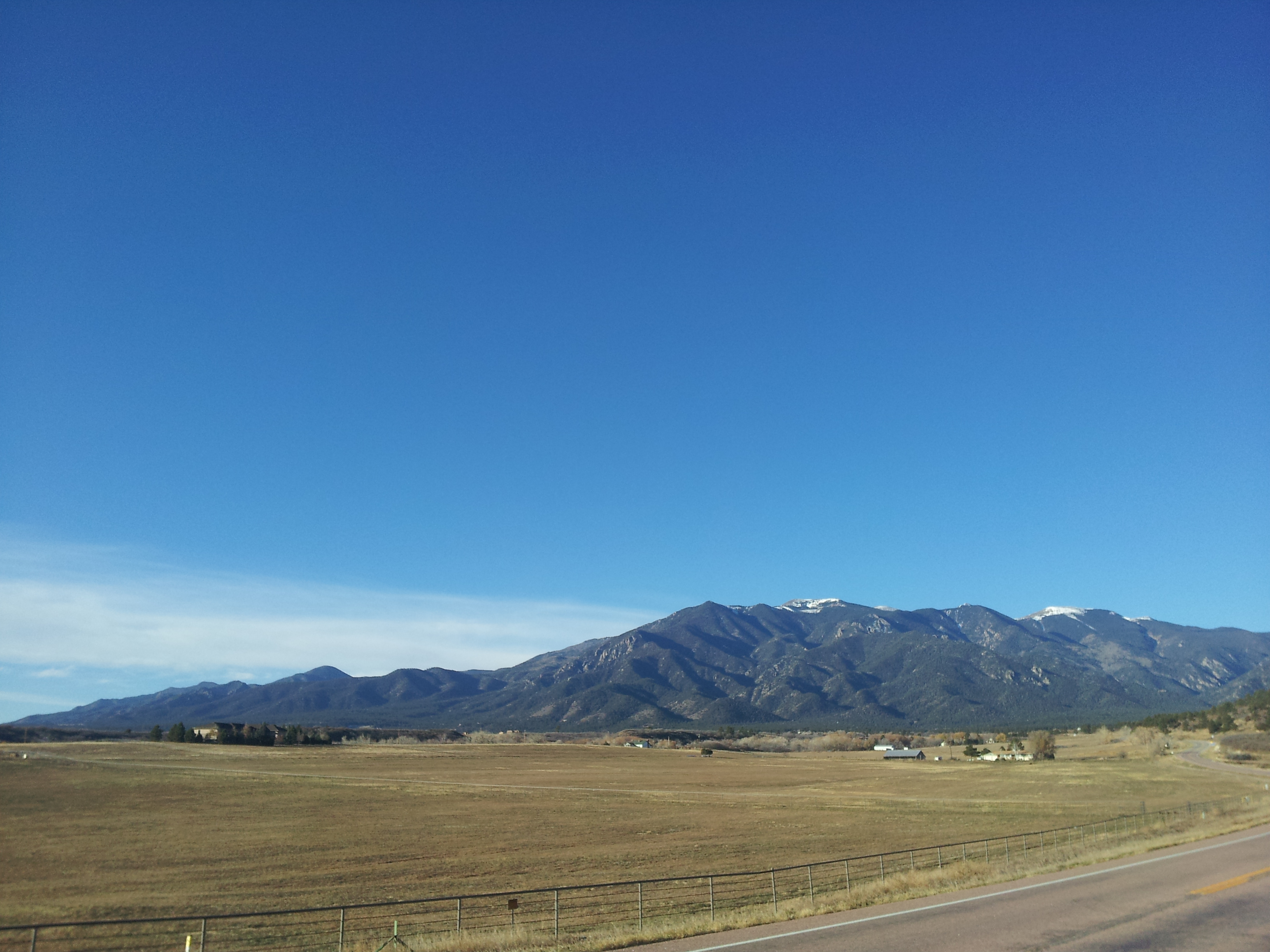
Cuerno Verde Mountain
