= Greenhorn Mountain Wilderness =

Protected area in Colorado, US

- IUCN category Ib (wilderness area)
- Location within Colorado Location within the United States
- Location: Huerfano / Pueblo counties, Colorado, USA
- Nearest city: Rye, Colorado
- Coordinates: 37°51′00″N 105°01′00″W
- Area: 22,040 acres (89.2 km^{2})
- Established: 1993
- Governing body: U.S. Forest Service

The Greenhorn Mountain Wilderness is a U.S. Wilderness Area located northwest of Walsenburg, Colorado in the San Isabel and Pike National Forests. The wilderness area includes the summit of Greenhorn Mountain, the highest point in the Wet Mountains of Colorado. There are 11 miles (18 km) of trails, all in the northern half of the wilderness.
