= SS Anglo Saxon =

A number of ships were named Anglo Saxon, Including:

- SS Anglo Saxon (1856), a Canadian ship which sank in 1863 with the loss of 237 lives
- SS Anglo Saxon (1929), a British ship which was torpedoed, shelled and sunk by the auxiliary cruiser Widder in 1940.
