= Greenhorn Creek =

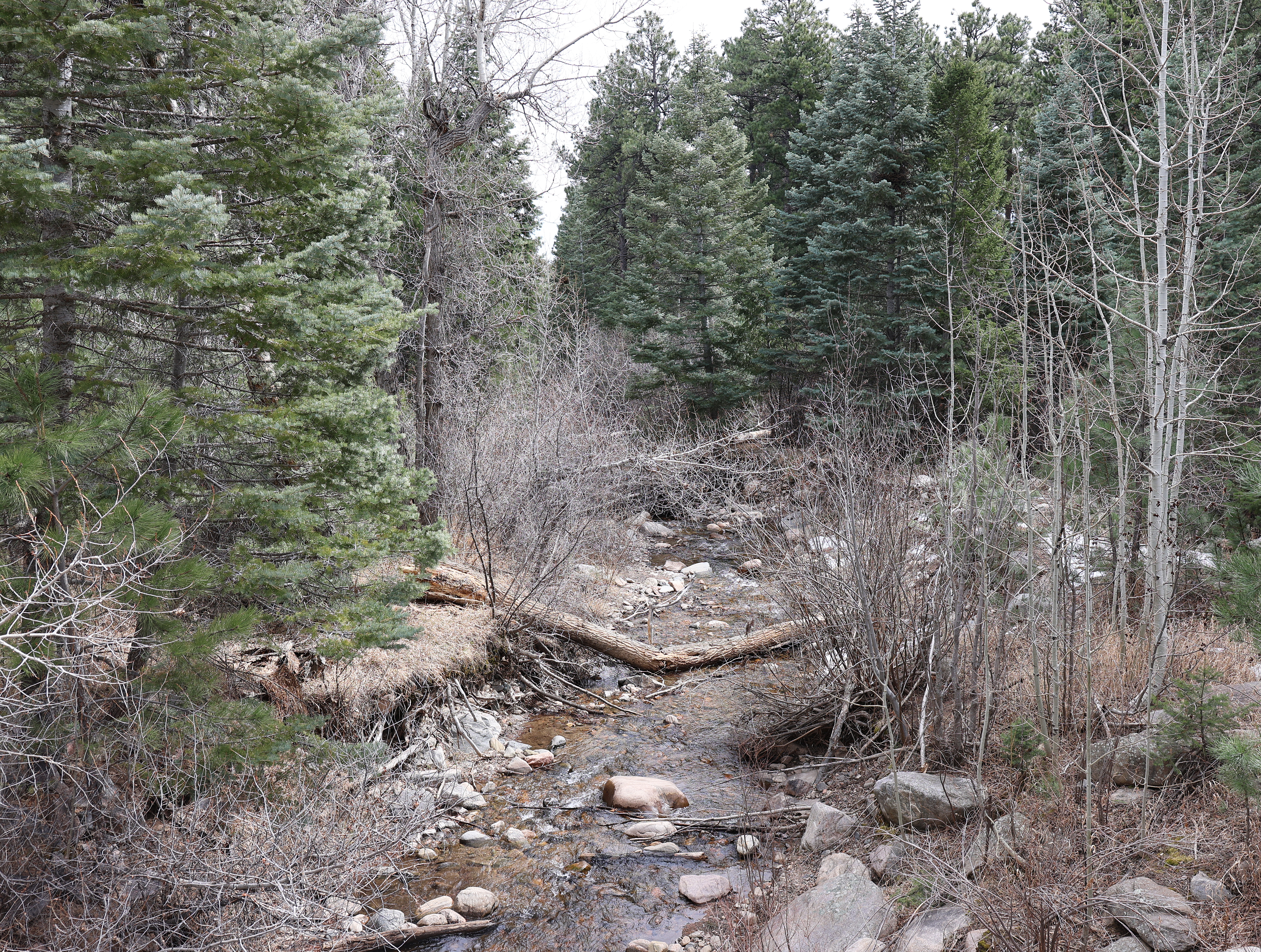
- The creek in Rye Mountain Park

- The location of the creek's mouth in Colorado
- Etymology: Named for Chief Cuerno Verde

Physical characteristics
- Source
  - location: San Isabel National Forest
  - coordinates: 37°55′16.03″N 105°3′30.97″W
- Mouth
  - location: Saint Charles River
  - coordinates: 38°8′39.59″N 104°37′46.81″W
  - elevation: 4,872 feet (1,485 meters)
- Length: 46 miles (74 kilometers).

Basin features
- Progression: Saint Charles River → Arkansas → Mississippi
- Tributaries
  - left: Cold Spring Creek; Scroggs Arroyo; Muddy Creek
  - right: Graneros Creek; Mills Arroyo

Greenhorn Creek is a tributary of the Saint Charles River in Custer and Pueblo counties in Colorado, U.S.

== Course ==
The creek rises in the Wet Mountains in Custer County, Colorado and in the San Isabel National Forest. Here it flows generally east, crossing into Pueblo County, Colorado on the northeast side of Greenhorn Mountain. Continuing east, the creek flows through Rye, Colorado and then Colorado City, Colorado. Next, the creek flows under Interstate 25 and turns north, flowing along the east side of the interstate. The creek then continues towards the northeast to its confluence with the Saint Charles River southeast of Stem Beach, Colorado.

== See also ==
- List of rivers of Colorado
