= Anglo-Norman =

Anglo-Norman may refer to:

- Anglo-Normans, the medieval ruling class in England following the Norman conquest of 1066
- Anglo-Norman language
  - Anglo-Norman literature
- Anglo-Norman England, or Norman England, the period in English history from 1066 till 1154
- Anglo-Norman horse, a breed from Normandy, France
- Anglo-Norman Isles, or Channel Islands, an archipelago in the English Channel
- CSS Anglo-Norman, a gunboat of the Confederate Navy

== See also ==
- Cambro-Normans
- Normans in Ireland
- Scoto-Norman
