= Greenhorn Mountain =

Mountain in Colorado, United States

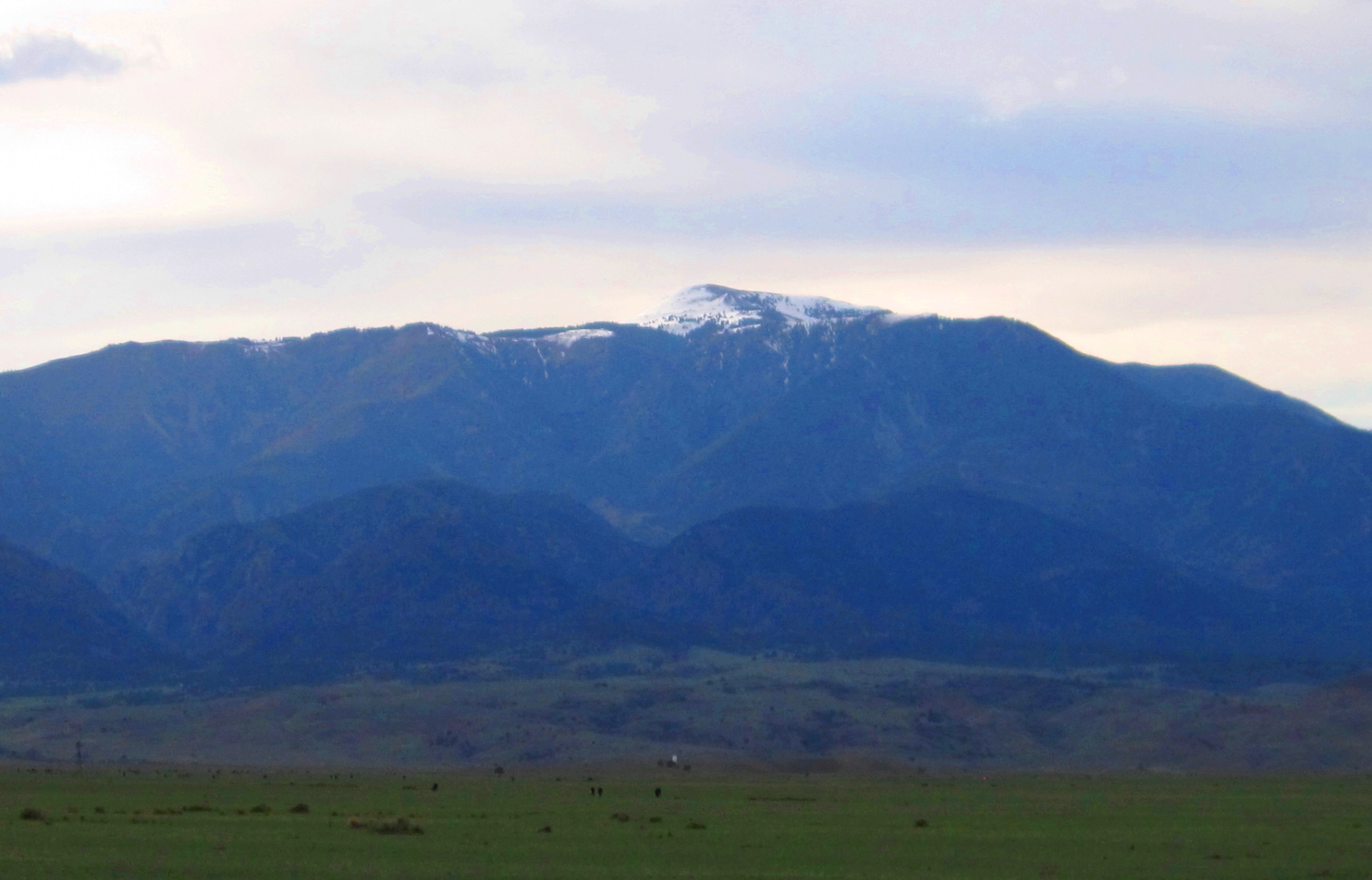
- Greenhorn Mountain seen from Walsenburg, Colorado

Highest point
- Elevation: 12,352 ft (3,765 m)
- Prominence: 3,777 ft (1,151 m)
- Isolation: 25.24 mi (40.62 km)
- Listing: Colorado county high points 35th
- Coordinates: 37°52′53″N 105°00′48″W

Geography
- Location within Colorado
- Location: Huerfano County and the high point of Pueblo County, Colorado, U.S.
- Parent range: Highest summit of the Wet Mountains
- Topo map(s): USGS 7.5' topographic map San Isabel, Colorado

Climbing
- Easiest route: Hike

Greenhorn Mountain is the highest summit of the Wet Mountains range in the Rocky Mountains of North America. The prominent 12,352-foot (3,765 m) peak is located in the Greenhorn Mountain Wilderness of San Isabel National Forest, 5.2 miles (8.4 km) southwest by west (bearing 238°) of the Town of Rye, Colorado, United States, on the boundary between Huerfano and Pueblo counties. The summit of Greenhorn Mountain is the highest point in Pueblo County, Colorado. The peak's summit rises above timberline, which is about 11,500 feet (3,500 m) in south-central Colorado.

== Geography ==
The massive Greenhorn Mountain can be seen from Colorado Springs, Pueblo, Trinidad, and also from along Interstate 25 rising over 6,000 feet (1,800 m) above the great plains to the east. The mountain's habitats are protected within the secluded Greenhorn Mountain Wilderness Area, which is only accessed by a few trails and a 4-wheel drive road on its north.

=== Climate ===
Greenhorn Mountain has a subalpine climate (Köppen Dfc) bordering on an alpine climate (ETH).

Climate data for Greenhorn Mountain 37.8901 N, 105.0251 W, Elevation: 11,998 ft (3,657 m) (1991–2020 normals)
Month	Jan	Feb	Mar	Apr	May	Jun	Jul	Aug	Sep	Oct	Nov	Dec	Year
Mean daily maximum °F (°C)	28.5 (−1.9)	28.5 (−1.9)	33.7 (0.9)	39.7 (4.3)	48.4 (9.1)	59.8 (15.4)	64.3 (17.9)	61.7 (16.5)	55.5 (13.1)	44.9 (7.2)	35.4 (1.9)	28.9 (−1.7)	44.1 (6.7)
Daily mean °F (°C)	16.8 (−8.4)	16.6 (−8.6)	21.3 (−5.9)	26.7 (−2.9)	35.5 (1.9)	45.9 (7.7)	50.5 (10.3)	48.8 (9.3)	42.8 (6.0)	33.0 (0.6)	24.2 (−4.3)	17.6 (−8.0)	31.6 (−0.2)
Mean daily minimum °F (°C)	5.1 (−14.9)	4.6 (−15.2)	8.9 (−12.8)	13.7 (−10.2)	22.5 (−5.3)	32.0 (0.0)	36.7 (2.6)	35.8 (2.1)	30.1 (−1.1)	21.1 (−6.1)	13.1 (−10.5)	6.2 (−14.3)	19.2 (−7.1)
Average precipitation inches (mm)	2.25 (57)	2.29 (58)	3.23 (82)	4.62 (117)	4.60 (117)	2.64 (67)	5.71 (145)	4.17 (106)	3.07 (78)	2.50 (64)	2.27 (58)	1.97 (50)	39.32 (999)
Source: PRISM Climate Group

== Name origin ==
The original name for the mountain peak was Cuerno Verde. The name comes from Cuerno Verde (Green Horn) given by the colonial Spanish of the Provincias Internas to two, father and son, Jupe Comanche band mahimiana paraibo or war chiefs. The younger Cuerno Verde was known to the Comanches as "Man Who Holds Danger." On September 3, 1779, younger Cuerno Verde, his son, medicine man, four principal chiefs, and ten of his warriors, were killed near Greenhorn Mountain by the men of the expedition of Spanish troops and native American allies (Apache, Ute, and Pueblo) under Juan Bautista de Anza.

US Board on Geographic Names decides in favor using Greenhorn over Cuerno Verde for highest peak of the Wet Mountains located in the US state of Colorado.

On April 4, 1906, the United States Board on Geographic Names decided to use the English translation, Greenhorn, for the name it carries today.

== See also ==
- List of mountain peaks of Colorado
  - List of the most prominent summits of Colorado
  - List of Colorado county high points

== Sources ==
- Pekka Hämäläinen, The Comanche Empire,Yale University Press, New Haven & London 2008, pages 103-104 ISBN 978-0300151176
