= Comanche =

Plains Native North American tribe

Comanche Nʉmʉnʉʉ
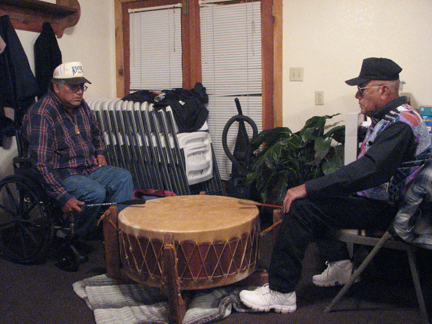
- Mac Silverhorn (Comanche), grandson of Silver Horn, drumming with friend at Redstone Baptist Church

Total population
- 17,000 enrolled Comanche Nation (2021), 28,193 self-identified, US census (2020)

Regions with significant populations
- United States (Oklahoma, Texas, New Mexico)

Languages
- English, Comanche

Religion
- Native American Church, Christianity, traditional tribal religion

Related ethnic groups
- Shoshone, Timbisha, and other Numic peoples

Nʉmʉ / Kɨmantsi "Person" / "Enemy, stranger"
- Person: Nʉmʉ
- People: Nʉmʉnʉʉ (Comanche)
- Language: Nʉmʉ Tekwapʉ̲ Mootekwaʔpʉ̠ (Hand Talk)
- Country: Nʉmʉnʉʉ Sookobitʉ (Comancheria)

The Comanche (/kəˈmæntʃi/), or Nʉmʉnʉʉ (Comanche: Nʉmʉnʉʉ, 'the people'), are a Native American people from the Southern Plains of the present-day United States. Comanche people today primarily belong to the federally recognized Comanche Nation, headquartered in Lawton, Oklahoma.

The Comanche language is a Numic language of the Uto-Aztecan family. Originally, it was a Shoshoni dialect, but diverged and became a separate language. The Comanche were once part of the Shoshone people of the Great Basin, diverging linguistically and culturally after adopting a nomadic horse culture in the early 18th century.

In the 18th and 19th centuries, the Comanche became renowned as some of the finest cavalry in history, utilising mobility and bison hunting to build a vast sovereign territory across present-day northwestern Texas, eastern New Mexico, southeastern Colorado, southwestern Kansas, and western Oklahoma - an empire known to colonists as Comanchería. Rather than a single centralized state, Comanche society operated through politically autonomous divisions linked by kinship. At their peak, the Comanche language was the lingua franca of the southern Great Plains region.

The Comanche commanded a complex web of diplomacy, trade, and conflict with neighboring Native American nations, European powers, and American settlers. Especially noteworthy were their large-scale raids in the 1840s and 1850s, which penetrated hundreds of miles into Mexico to capture livestock they mostly sold to Anglo-Americans in Texas. They also took many captives, using them as slaves, selling them to the Spanish and (later) to Mexican settlers, or adopting them into their tribe. Thousands of captives from raids, as well as entire Native American groups were assimilated into Comanche society. Epidemics of diseases, destruction of the bison herds, and warfare and massacres by the U.S. army forced the Comanche onto reservations in Indian Territory in the mid-1870s.

Alongside their vast artistic culture they maintain an influential legacy, exemplified by figures like the 19th-century war chief Quanah Parker, as well as contributions from World War I and II code talkers. In the 21st century, around 7,000 Comanche reside in tribal jurisdictional areas around Lawton, Fort Sill, and the surrounding areas of southwestern Oklahoma. The Comanche Homecoming Annual Dance takes place in mid-July in Walters, Oklahoma.

== Name ==
The Comanche's autonym is nʉmʉnʉʉ, meaning 'the human beings' or 'the people'. The earliest known use of the term "Comanche" dates to 1706, when the Comanche were reported by Spanish officials to be preparing to attack far-outlying Pueblo settlements in southern Colorado. The Spanish adopted the Ute name for the people: kɨmantsi ('enemy'), spelling it Comanche (or Comanchi, Cumanche, Cumanchi) in accord with the Spanish pronunciation. Before 1740, French explorers from the east sometimes used the name Padouca for the Comanche since it was already used for the Plains Apache and the French were not aware of the change of tribe in the region in the early 18th century.

== Government ==
Map of Comanche Nation's tribal jurisdictional area (OTSA) and nearby jurisdiction areas. Shared with Kiowa Tribe, Apache Tribe of Oklahoma and Fort Sill Apache Tribe of Oklahoma.

The Comanche Nation is headquartered in Lawton, Oklahoma. Their tribal jurisdictional area is located in Caddo, Comanche, Cotton, Greer, Jackson, Kiowa, Tillman, and Harmon Counties. Their current tribal chairman is Forrest Tahdooahnippah. The tribe requires enrolled citizens to have at least one-eighth blood quantum level (equivalent to one great-grandparent).

In 2025, their administration was:

- Chairman: Forrest Tahdooahnippah
- Vice Chair: Diana Gail Doyebi-Sovo
- Secretary-Treasurer: Benny Tahmahkera Jr.
- Committee Member: Jordan Fox
- Committee Member: Darrell Kosechequetah
- Committee Member: Alice Kassanavoid
- Committee Member: Hazel Tahsequah

== Economic development ==
The tribe operates its own housing authority and issues tribal vehicle tags. They have their own Department of Higher Education, primarily awarding scholarships and financial aid for citizens' college educations. They own 10 tribal smoke shops and six casinos:

1. Comanche Nation Casino in Lawton, Oklahoma
2. Red River Casino in Devol, Oklahoma
3. Comanche Spur Casino in Elgin, Oklahoma
4. Comanche Star Casino in Walters, Oklahoma.
5. Comanche Cache Casino in Cache, Oklahoma
6. Comanche Nation Travel Plaza Casino in Devol, Oklahoma

== Cultural institutions ==
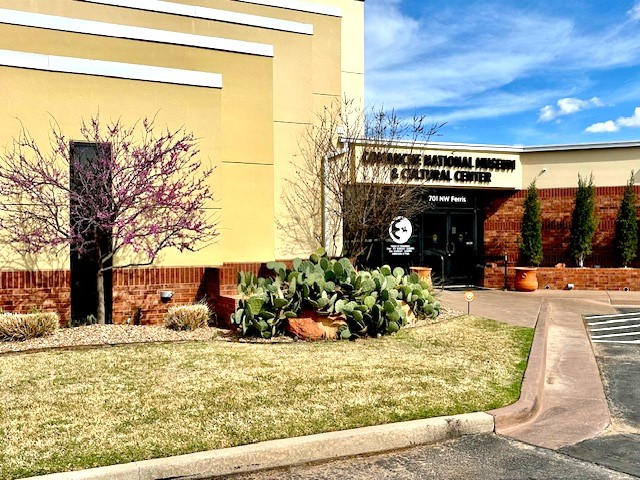
Comanche National Museum and Cultural Center in Lawton, 3-2025

The Comanche National Museum and Cultural Center in Lawton has permanent and changing exhibitions on Comanche history and culture. It opened to the public in 2007.

In 2002, the tribe founded the Comanche Nation College, a two-year tribal college in Lawton. It closed in 2017 because of problems with accreditation and funding.

Every year on the third Saturday in April, the Annual General Council is held in which the annual budget is approved, new leadership is nominated for election, and tribal members are able to present resolutions to be voted on. Each July, Comanches gather from across the United States to celebrate their heritage and culture in Walters at the annual Comanche Homecoming powwow. The Comanche Nation Fair takes place every September. The Comanche Little Ponies host two annual dances—one over New Year's Eve and one in May.

== History ==
=== Formation ===
Pre-contact distribution of Uto-Aztecan languages

The Proto-Comanche movement to the Plains was part of the larger phenomenon known as the "Shoshonean Expansion" in which that language family spread across the Great Basin and across the mountains into Wyoming. The Kotsoteka ("Bison Eaters") were probably among the first. Other groups followed. Contact with the Shoshones of Wyoming was maintained until the 1830s when it was broken by the advancing Cheyennes and Arapahoes.

After the Pueblo Revolt of 1680, various Plains peoples acquired horses, but it was probably some time before they were very numerous. As late as 1725, Comanches were described as using large dogs rather than horses to carry their bison-hide "campaign tents".

Horses became a key element in the emergence of a distinctive Comanche culture. They were of such strategic importance that some scholars suggested that the Comanche broke away from the Shoshone and moved south to search for additional sources of horses among the settlers of New Spain (rather than search for new herds of buffalo). The Comanche have the longest documented existence as horse-mounted Plains peoples; they had horses when the Cheyenne still lived in earth lodges.

The Comanche supplied horses and mules to all comers. As early as 1795, the Comanche were selling horses to Anglo-American traders. and by the mid-19th century, Comanche-supplied horses were flowing into St. Louis via other Indian middlemen (Seminole, Osage, Shawnee).

Their original migration took them to the southern Great Plains, into a sweep of territory extending from the Arkansas River to central Texas. The earliest references to them in the Spanish records date from 1706, when reports reached Santa Fe that Utes and Comanches were about to attack. In the Comanche advance, the Apaches were driven off the Plains. The Comanche displaced many indigenous tribes, not just the Apache. By the end of the 18th century, the struggle between Comanche and Apache had assumed legendary proportions; in 1784, in recounting the history of the southern Plains, Texas Governor Domingo Cabello y Robles recorded that some 60 years earlier (i.e., circa 1724), the Apache had been routed from the Southern Plains in a nine-day battle at La Gran Sierra del Fierro, the "Great Mountain of Iron", somewhere northwest of Texas. But no other record, documentary, or legendary, of such a fight has been found.

They were formidable warriors who developed strategies for using traditional weapons for fighting on horseback. Warfare was a major part of Comanche life. Their raids into Mexico traditionally took place during the full moon, when they could see to ride at night. This led to the term "Comanche Moon", during which the Comanche raided for horses, captives, and weapons. Comanche raids, especially in the 1840s, reached hundreds of miles deep into Mexico, devastating northern parts of the country.

=== Divisions ===
Comanche woman.

Penateka Comanche.

Kavanagh has defined four levels of social-political integration in traditional Comanche society before reservations:

- Patrilineal and patrilocal nuclear family
- Extended family group (nʉmʉnahkahni – "the people who live together in a household", no size limits, but kinship recognition was limited to relatives two generations above or three below)
- Residential local group or "band", comprised one or more nʉmʉnahkahni, one of which formed its core. The band was the primary social unit of the Comanche. A typical band might number several hundred people. It was a family group, centered around a group of men, all of whom were relatives, sons, brothers, or cousins. Since marriage with a known relative was forbidden, wives came from another group, and sisters left to join their husbands. The central man in that group was their grandfather, father, or uncle. He was called paraivo, "chief". After his death, one of the other men took his place; if none was available, the band members might drift apart to other groups, where they might have relatives and/or establish new relations by marrying an existing member. No separate term was used for the status of peace chief or war chief; any man leading a war party was a war chief.
- Division (sometimes called tribe, Spanish nación, rama – "branch", comprising several local groups linked by kinship, sodalities (political, medicine, and military), and shared interest in hunting, gathering, war, peace, and trade).

In contrast to the neighboring Cheyenne and Arapaho to the north, a single Comanche political unit or "Nation" was not historically recognized by all Comanche in previous centuries. Rather, the divisions, the most "tribe-like" units, acted independently, pursuing their own economic and political goals.

Before the 1750s, the Spanish identified three Comanche Naciones (divisions): Hʉpenʉʉ (Jupe, Hoipi), Yaparʉhka (Yamparika), and Kʉhtsʉtʉhka (Kotsoteka).

After the Mescalero Apache, Jicarilla Apache, and Lipan Apache had been largely displaced from the Southern Plains by the Comanche and allied tribes in the 1780s, the Spanish began to divide the now-dominant Comanche into two geographical groups, which only partially corresponded to the former three naciones. The Kʉhtsʉtʉhka (Kotsoteka) (Buffalo Eaters), which had moved southeast in the 1750s and 1760s to the Southern Plains in Texas, were called Cuchanec Orientales (Eastern Cuchanec/Kotsoteka") or Eastern Comanche, while those Kʉhtsʉtʉhka (Kotsoteka) who remained in the northwest and west, together with Hʉpenʉʉ (Jupe, Hoipi – Timber/Forest People) (and sometimes Yaparʉhka (Yamparika)), which had moved southward to the North Canadian River, were called Cuchanec Occidentales (Western Cuchanec/Kotsoteka) or Western Comanche. The Western Comanche lived in the region of the upper Arkansas, Canadian, and Red Rivers, and the Llano Estacado. The Eastern Comanche lived on the Edwards Plateau and the Texas plains of the upper Brazos and Colorado Rivers, and east to the Cross Timbers. They were probably the ancestors of the Penatʉka Nʉʉ (Penateka – Honey Eaters).

Over time, these divisions were altered in various ways, primarily due to changes in political resources. As noted above, the Kʉhtsʉtʉhka (Kotsoteka) were probably the first proto-Comanche group to separate from the Eastern Shoshone.

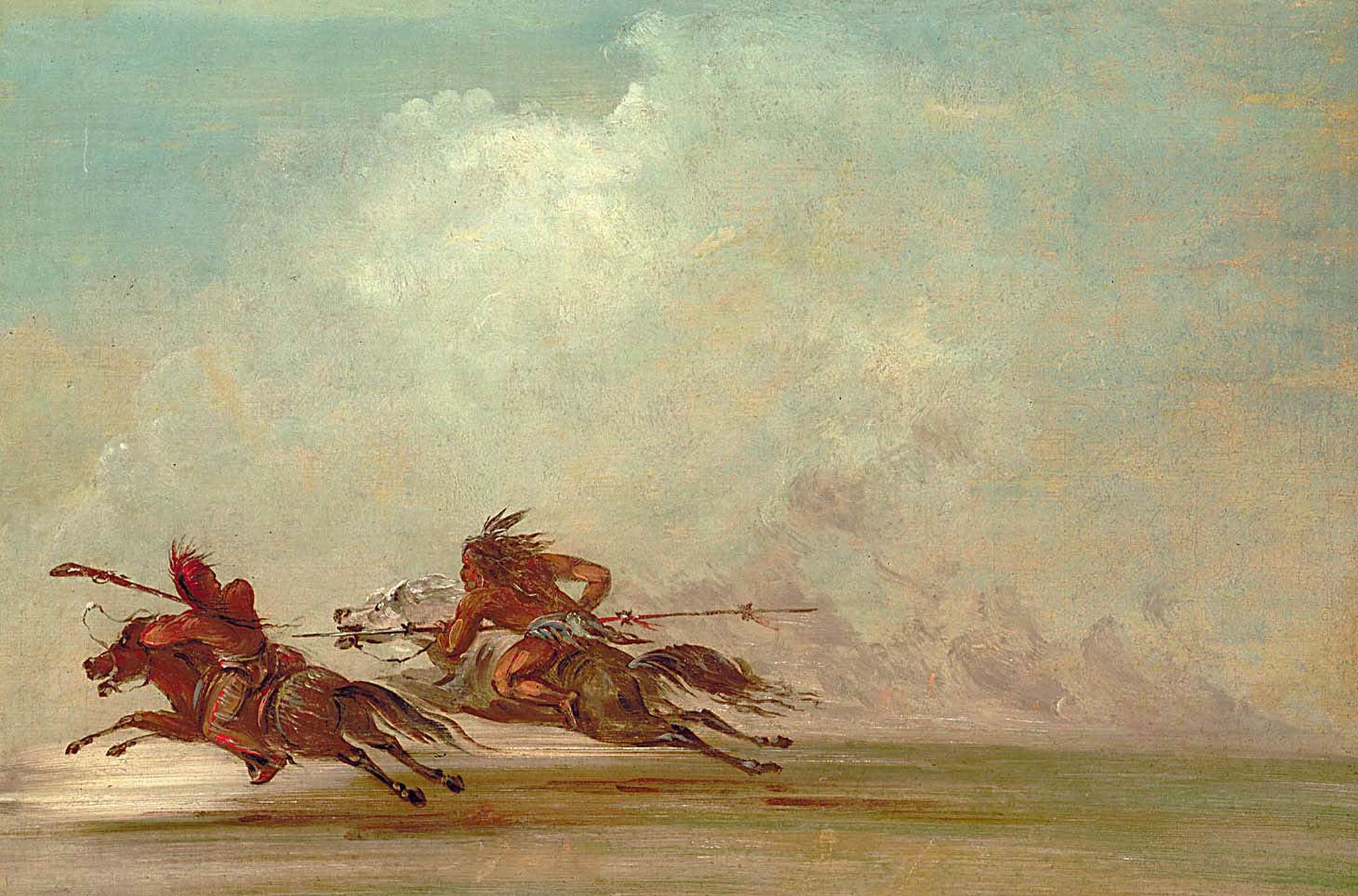
War on the Plains: Comanche (right) trying to lance an Osage warrior, painting by George Catlin, 1834

The name Hʉpenʉʉ (Jupe, Hoipi) vanished from history in the early 19th century, probably merging into the other divisions; they are likely the forerunners of the Nokoni Nʉʉ (Nokoni), Kwaarʉ Nʉʉ (Kwahadi, Quohada), and Hʉpenʉʉ (Hois) local group of the Penatʉka Nʉʉ (Penateka). Due to pressure by southward-moving Kiowa and Plains Apache (Naishan) raiders, many Yaparʉhka (Yamparika) moved southeast, joining the Eastern Comanche and becoming known as the Tahnahwah (Tenawa, Tenahwit). Many Kiowa and Plains Apache moved to northern Comancheria and became later closely associated with the Yaparʉhka (Yamparika).

In the mid-19th century, other powerful divisions arose, such as the Nokoni Nʉʉ (Nokoni) (Wanderers, literally "go someplace and return"), and the Kwaarʉ Nʉʉ (Kwahadi, Quohada) (Antelope Eaters). The latter originally were some local groups of the Kʉhtsʉtʉhka (Kotsoteka) from the Cimarron River Valley and descendants of some Hʉpenʉʉ (Jupe, Hoipi), who had pulled both southwards.

The northernmost Comanche division was the Yaparʉhka (Yapai Nʉʉ or Yamparika — (Yap)Root Eaters). As the last band to move onto the Plains, they retained much of their Eastern Shoshone tradition.

The power and success of the Comanche attracted bands of neighboring peoples, who joined them and became part of Comanche society; an Arapaho group became known as Saria Tʉhka (Chariticas, Sata Teichas – Dog Eaters) band, an Eastern Shoshone group as Pohoi (Pohoee – Wild Sage) band, and a Plains Apache group as the Tasipenanʉʉ band.

The Texans and Americans divided the Comanche into five, large, dominant bands – the Yaparʉhka (Yamparika), Kʉhtsʉtʉhka (Kotsoteka), Nokoni Nʉʉ (Nokoni), Penatʉka Nʉʉ (Penateka), and Kwaarʉ Nʉʉ (Kwahadi, Quohada)', which in turn were divided by geographical terms into first three (later four) regional groupings: Northern Comanche, Middle Comanche, Southern Comanche, Eastern Comanche, and later Western Comanche. These terms, though, generally do not correspond to the native language terms.

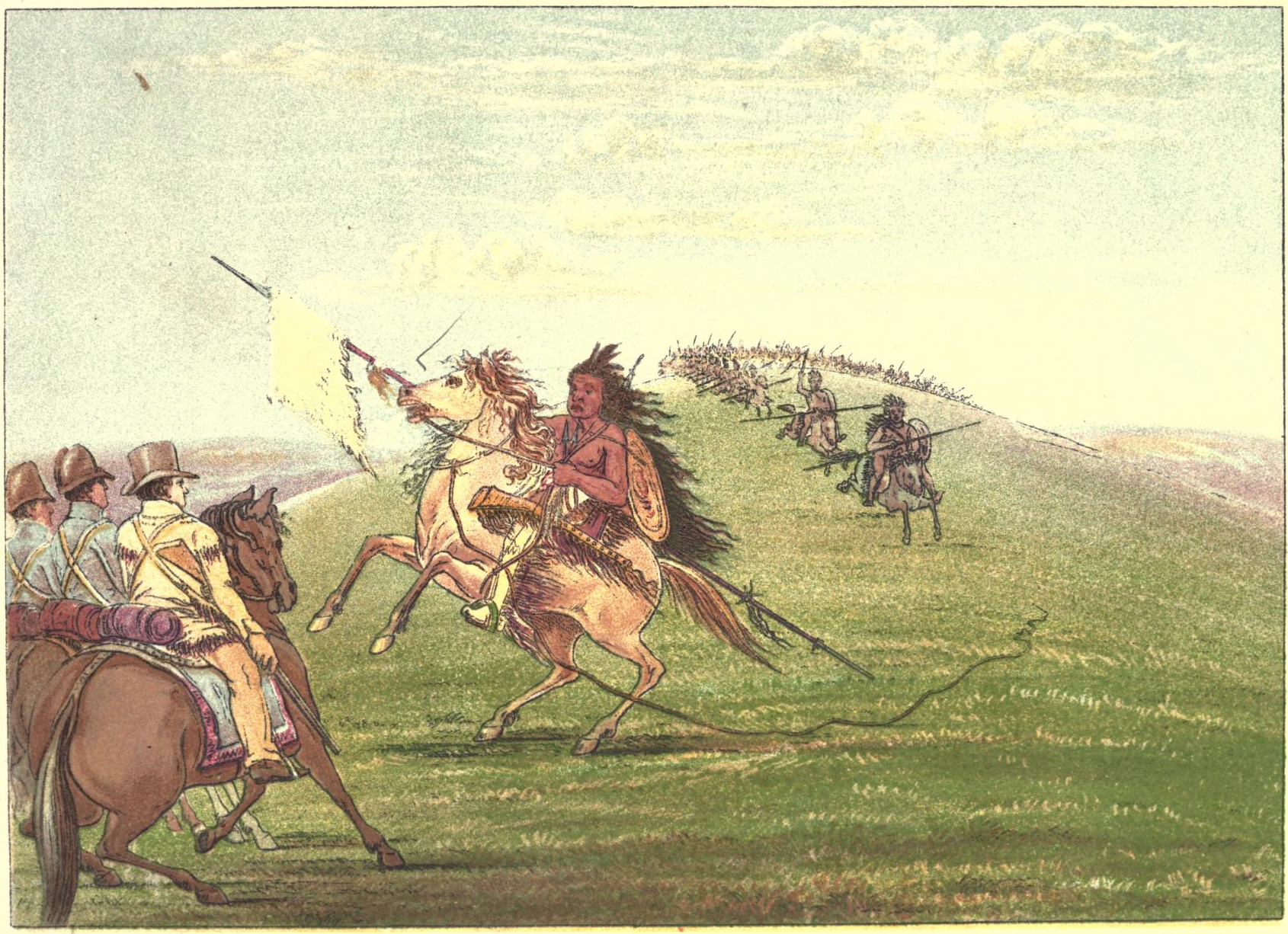
Comanches meeting the U.S. dragoons near the Wichita Mountains in 1834, by George Catlin

The Northern Comanche label encompassed the Yaparʉhka (Yamparika) between the Arkansas River and Canadian River and the prominent and powerful Kʉhtsʉtʉhka (Kotsoteka), who roamed the High Plains of Oklahoma and Texas Panhandles between the Red and Canadian Rivers; the famous Palo Duro Canyon offered their horse herds and them protection from strong winter storms and enemies, because the two bands dominated and ranged in the northern Comancheria.

The Middle Comanche label encompassed the aggressive Nokoni Nʉʉ (Nokoni) (Wanderers, "those who turn back") between the headwaters of the Red River and the Colorado River in the south and the Western Cross Timbers in the east; their preferred ranges were on the Brazos River headwaters and its tributaries, and the Pease River offered protection from storms and enemies. Two smaller bands shared the same tribal areas: the Tahnahwah (Tenawa, Tenahwit) (Those Living Downstream) and Tanimʉʉ (Tanima, Dahaʉi, Tevawish) (Liver Eaters). All three bands together were known as Middle Comanche because they lived "in the middle" of the Comancheria.

The Southern Comanche label encompassed the Penatʉka Nʉʉ (Penateka) (Honey Eaters), the southernmost, largest, and best-known band among Whites as they lived near the first Spanish and Texan settlements; their tribal areas extended from the upper reaches of the rivers in central Texas and Colorado River southward, including much of the Edwards Plateau, and eastward to the Western Cross Timbers; because they dominated the southern Comancheria, they were called Southern Comanche.

The Western Comanche label encompassed the Kwaarʉ Nʉʉ (Kwahadi, Quohada) (Antelope Eaters), who is the last to develop as an independent band in the 19th century. They lived on the hot, low-shadow desert plateaus of Llano Estacado in eastern New Mexico, and found shelter in Tule Canyon and Palo Duro Canyon in northwestern Texas. They were the only band that never signed a contract with the Texans or Americans, and they were the last to give up the resistance. Because of their relative isolation from the other bands on the westernmost edge of the Comancheria, they were called the Western Comanche.

Much confusion has occurred and continues in the presentation of Comanche group names. Groups on all levels of organization, families, nʉmʉnahkahni, bands, and divisions, were given names, but many band lists do not distinguish these levels. In addition, alternate names and nicknames could exist. The spelling differences between Spanish and English add to the confusion.

=== Some of the Comanche group names ===
- Yaparʉhka or Yamparika (also Yapai Nʉʉ – (Yap)Root Eaters; One of its local groups may have been called Widyʉ Nʉʉ / Widyʉ / Widyʉ Yapa – Awl People; after the death of a man named Awl, they changed their name to Tʉtsahkʉnanʉʉ or Ditsahkanah – Sewing People [Titchahkaynah]. Other Yapai local groups included:
  - Ketahtoh or Ketatore (Don't Wear Shoes, also called Napwat Tʉ – Wearing No Shoes)
  - Motso (′Bearded Ones′, derived from motso – beard)
  - Pibia Ni̠wʉnʉʔnʉʉ (or Pibianigwai - Loud Talkers, Loud Askers)
  - Sʉhmʉhtʉhka (Eat Everything)
  - Wahkoh (Shell Ornament)
  - Waw'ai or Wohoi (also Waaih – Lots of Maggots on the Penis, also called Nahmahe'enah – Somehow being (sexual) together, to have sex, called by other groups, because they preferred to marry endogamously and chose their partners from their own local group; this was viewed critically by other Comanche people.)
- Hʉpenʉʉ or Jupe (Timber People because they lived in more wooded areas in the Central Plains north of the Arkansas River, also spelled Hois.
- Kʉhtsʉtʉʉka or Kotsoteka (Buffalo Eaters, spelled in Spanish as Cuchanec)
- Kwaarʉnʉʉ or Kwahadi/Quohada (Kwahare – Antelope Eaters; nicknamed Kwahihʉʉki – Sunshades on Their Backs, because they lived on desert plains of the Llano Estacado in eastern New Mexico, westernmost Comanche Band). One of their local groups was nicknamed Parʉhʉya (Elk, literally Water Horse).
- Nokoninʉʉ or Nokoni (Movers, Returners); allegedly, after the death of chief Peta Nocona, they called themselves Noyʉhkanʉʉ – Not Staying in One Place, and/or Tʉtsʉ Noyʉkanʉʉ / Detsanayʉka – Bad Campers, Poor Wanderer
  - Tahnahwah or Tenawa (also Tenahwit – Those Who Live Downstream
  - Tanimʉʉ or Tanima (also called Dahaʉi or Tevawish – Liver Eaters
- Penatʉka Nʉʉ or Penateka (other variants: Pihnaatʉka, Penanʉʉ – Honey Eaters

Some names given by others include:

- WahaToya (literally Two Mountains); (given as Foothills in Cloud People – those who live near Walsenburg, CO
- Toyanʉmʉnʉ (Foothills People – those who lived near Las Vegas, NM)

Unassignable names include:

- Tayʉʉwit / Teyʉwit (Hospitable Ones)
- Kʉvahrahtpaht (Steep Climbers)
- Taykahpwai / Tekapwai (No Meat)
- Pagatsʉ (Pa'káh'tsa – Head of the Stream, also called Pahnaixte – Those Who Live Upstream)
- Mʉtsahne or Motsai (Undercut Bank)

Old Shoshone names

- Pekwi Tʉhka (Fish Eaters)
- Pohoi / Pohoee (Wild Sage)

Other names, which may or may not refer to Comanche groups include:

- Hani Nʉmʉ (Hai'ne'na'ʉne – Corn Eating People), Wichitas
- It'chit'a'bʉd'ah (Utsu'itʉ – Cold People, i.e. Northern People, probably another name for the Yaparʉhka or one of their local groups – because they lived to the north)
- Itehtah'o (Burnt Meat, nicknamed by other Comanche, because they threw their surplus of meat out in the spring, where it dried and became black, looking like burnt meat)
- Naʉ'niem (No'na'ʉm – Ridge People

Modern local groups

- Ohnonʉʉ (also Ohnʉnʉnʉʉ or Onahʉnʉnʉʉ, Salt People or Salt Creek people) live in Caddo County in the vicinity of Cyril, Oklahoma; mostly descendants of the Nokoni Pianavowit
- Wianʉʉ (Wianʉ, Wia'ne – Hill Wearing Away), live east of Walters, Oklahoma, descendants of Waysee

=== Comanche Wars ===
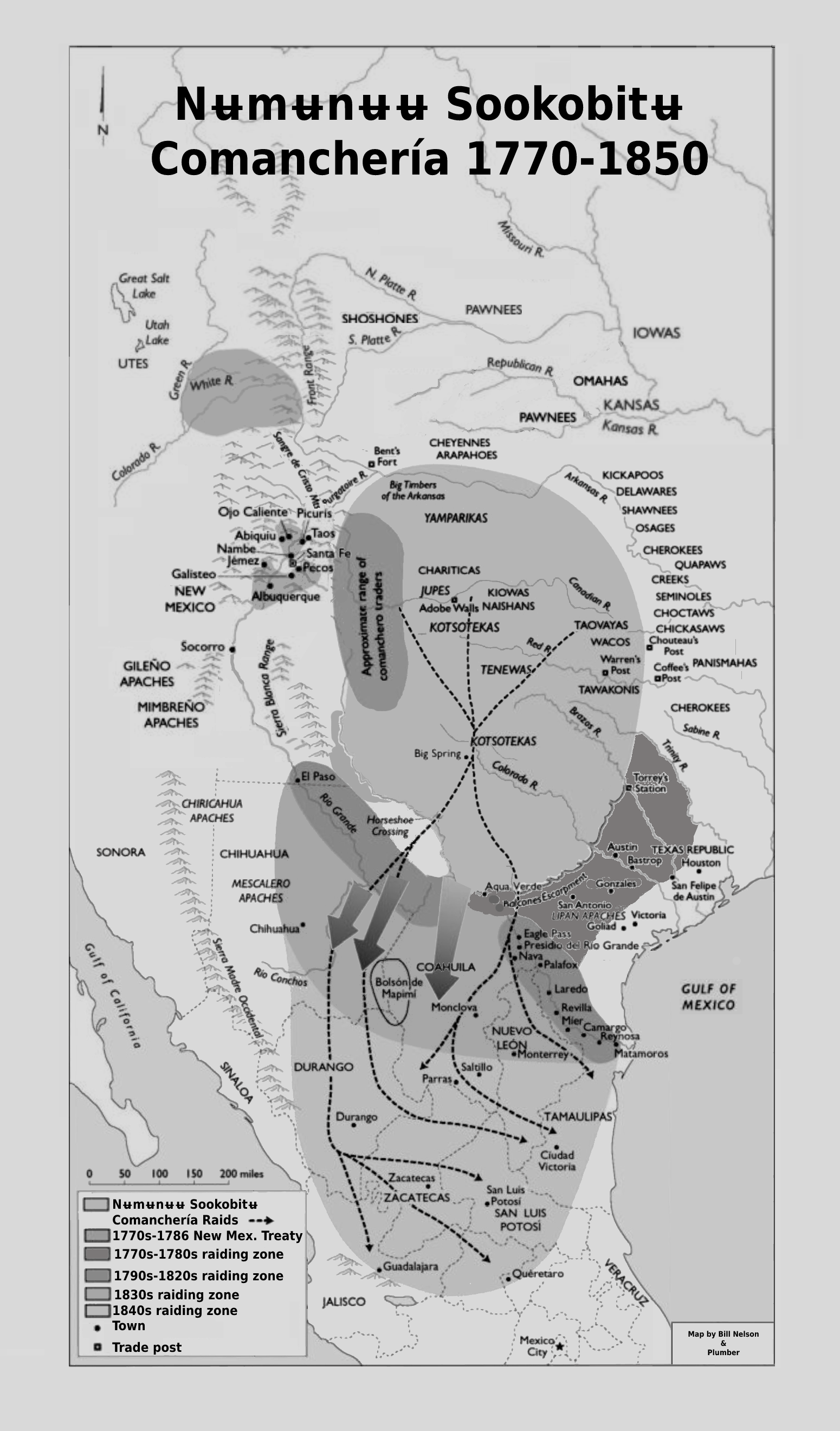
Comancheria 1770–1850.

The Comanche fought a number of conflicts against Spanish and later Mexican and American armies. These were both expeditionary, as with the raids into Mexico, and defensive. They also fought against many other tribes, especially the Apache. As they came south, they destroyed, drove out or assimilated the tribes that currently held these lands. By the 1760s, many Apache bands simply vanished from history. The Comanche were noted as fierce warriors who fought vigorously for their homeland of Comancheria. However, the massive population of the settlers from the east and the diseases they brought led to pressure and decline of Comanche power and the cessation of their major presence in the southern Great Plains.

=== Relationship with settlers ===
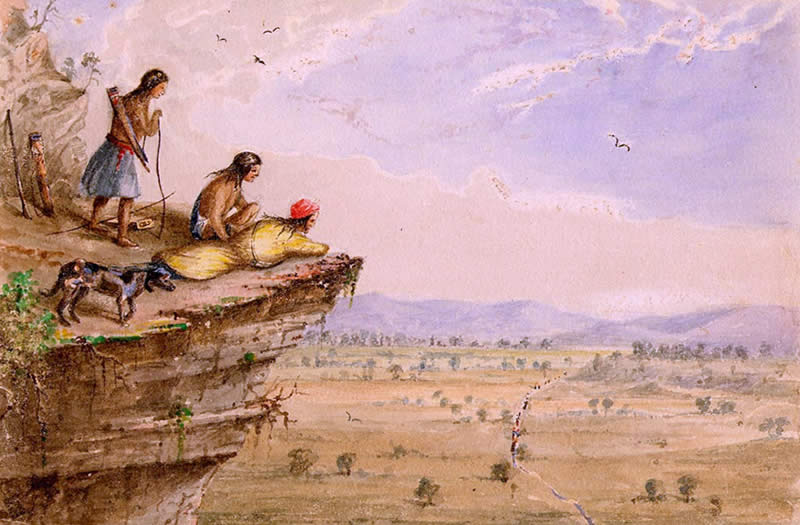
Comanches watching an American caravan in West Texas, 1850, by the US Army officer, Arthur Lee

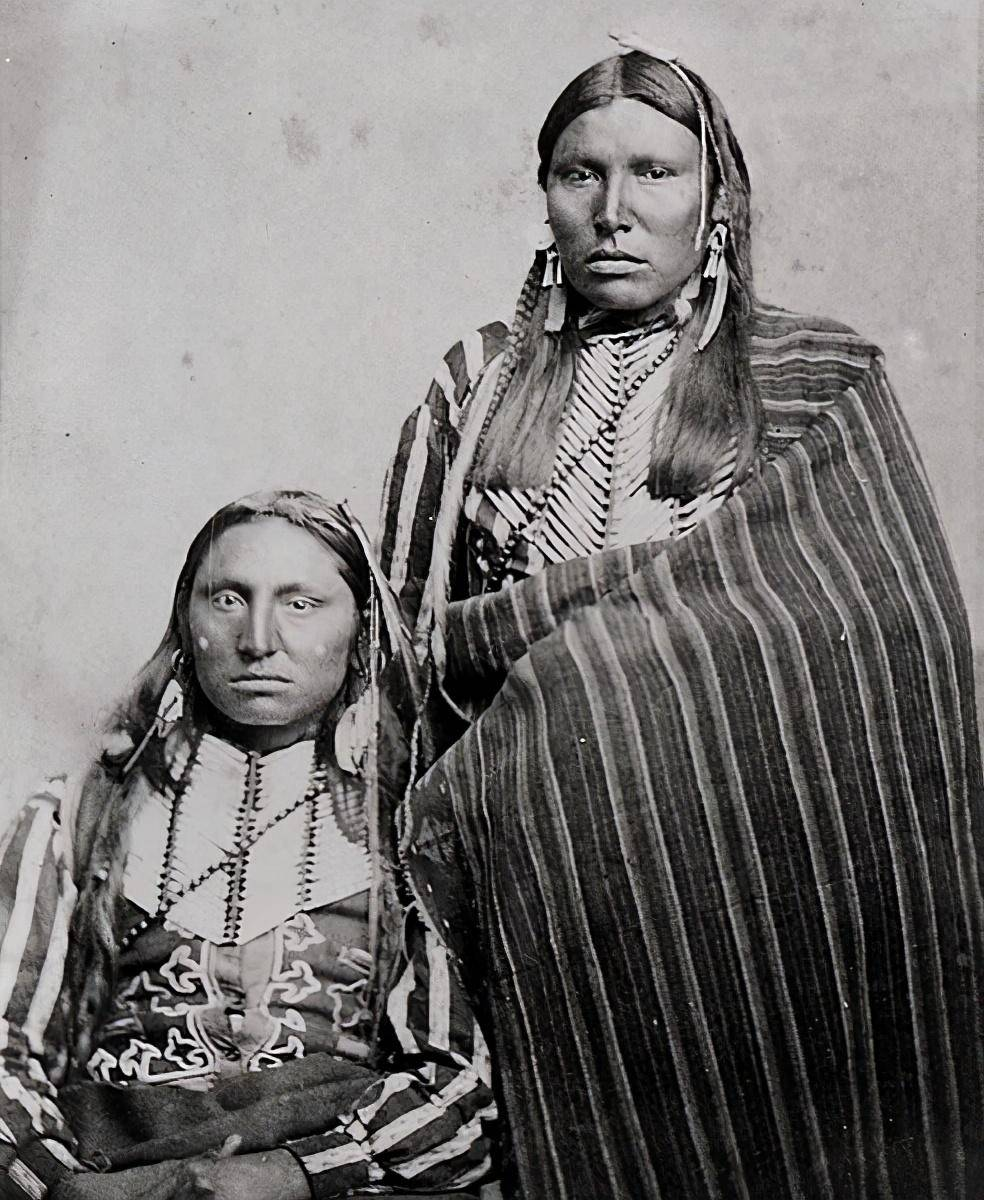
Comanche warriors, c. 1867–1874

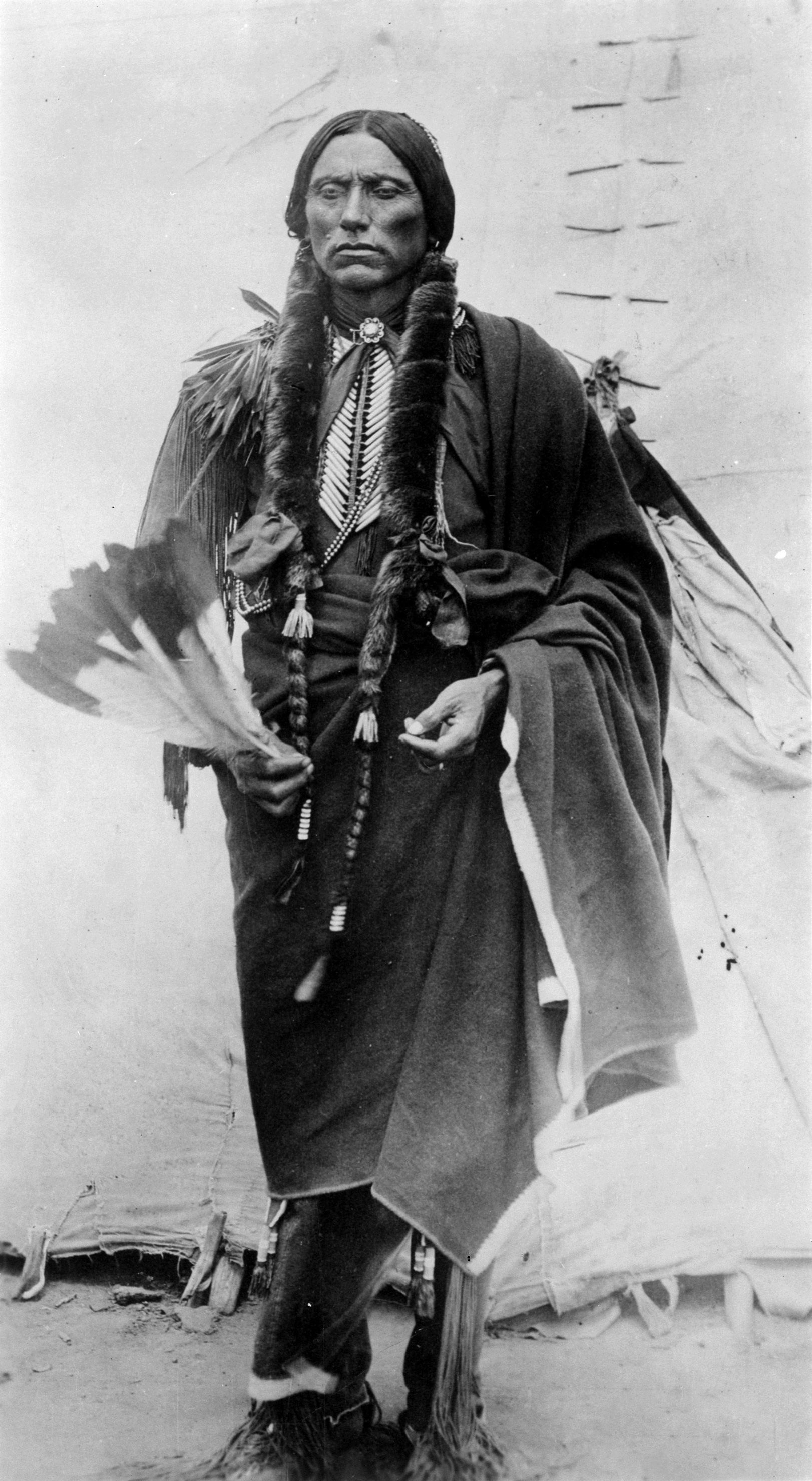
Quanah Parker, prominent chief of the Comanche Indians with a feather fan; photo by James Mooney, 1892

The Comanche maintained an ambiguous relationship with Europeans and later settlers attempting to colonize their territory. The Comanche were valued as trading partners since 1786 via the Comancheros of New Mexico, but were feared for their raids against settlers in Texas. Similarly, they were, at one time or another, at war with virtually every other Native American group living on the South Plains, leaving opportunities for political maneuvering by European colonial powers and the United States. At one point, Sam Houston, president of the newly created Republic of Texas, almost succeeded in reaching a peace treaty with the Comanche in the 1844 Treaty of Tehuacana Creek. His efforts were thwarted in 1845 when the Texas Legislature refused to create an official boundary between Texas and the Comancheria.

While the Comanche managed to maintain their independence and increase their territory, by the mid-19th century, they faced annihilation because of a wave of epidemics due to Eurasian diseases to which they had no immunity, such as smallpox and measles. Outbreaks of smallpox (1817, 1848) and cholera (1849) took a major toll on the Comanche, whose population dropped from an estimated 20,000 in the late 18th century to just a few thousand by the 1870s.

The US began efforts in the late 1860s to move the Comanche into reservations, with the Treaty of Medicine Lodge (1867), which offered churches, schools, and annuities in return for a vast tract of land totaling over 60,000 square miles (160,000 km^{2}). The government promised to stop the buffalo hunters, who were steadily exterminating the great bison herds of the Plains, provided that the Comanche, along with the Apaches, Kiowas, Cheyenne, and Arapahos, move to a reservation totaling less than 5,000 square miles (13,000 km^{2}) of land, but the government did not prevent the slaughtering of the herds. The Comanche under Quenatosavit White Eagle (later called Isa-tai "Coyote's Vagina") retaliated by attacking a group of hunters in the Texas Panhandle in the Second Battle of Adobe Walls (1874). The attack was a disaster for the Comanche, and the US army was called in during the Red River War to drive the remaining Comanche in the area into the reservation, culminating in the Battle of Palo Duro Canyon. Within just 10 years, the bison were on the verge of extinction, effectively ending the Comanche way of life as hunters. In May 1875, the last free band of Comanches, led by Quahada warrior Quanah Parker, surrendered and moved to the Fort Sill reservation in Oklahoma. The last independent Kiowa and Kiowa Apache had also surrendered.

The 1890 Census showed 1,598 Comanche at the Fort Sill reservation, which they shared with 1,140 Kiowa and 326 Kiowa Apache.

==== Meusebach–Comanche treaty ====
The Peneteka band agreed to a peace treaty with the German Immigration Company under John O. Meusebach. This treaty was not affiliated with any level of government. Meusebach brokered the treaty to settle the lands on the Fisher-Miller Land Grant, from which were formed the 10 counties of Concho, Kimble, Llano, Mason, McCulloch, Menard, Schleicher, San Saba, Sutton, and Tom Green.

In contrast to many treaties of its day, this treaty was very brief and simple, with all parties agreeing to a mutual cooperation and a sharing of the land. The treaty was agreed to at a meeting in San Saba County, and signed by all parties on May 9, 1847, in Fredericksburg, Texas. The treaty was very specifically between the Peneteka band and the German Immigration Company. No other band or tribe was involved. The German Immigration Company was dissolved by Meusebach himself shortly after it had served its purpose. By 1875, the Comanches had been relocated to reservations.

Five years later, artist Friedrich Richard Petri and his family moved to the settlement of Pedernales, near Fredericksburg. Petri's sketches and watercolors gave witness to the friendly relationships between the Germans and various local Native American tribes.

==== Fort Martin Scott treaty ====
In 1850, another treaty was signed in San Saba, between the United States government and a number of local tribes, among which were the Comanche. This treaty was named for the nearest military fort, which was Fort Martin Scott. The treaty was never officially ratified by any level of government and was binding only on the part of the Native Americans.

==== Cherokee Commission ====
The Agreement with the Comanche, Kiowa and Apache signed with the Cherokee Commission October 6–21, 1892, further reduced their reservation to 480,000 acres (1,900 km^{2}) at a cost of $1.25 per acre ($308.88/km^{2}), with an allotment of 160 acres (0.65 km^{2}) per person per tribe to be held in trust. New allotments were made in 1906 to all children born after the agreement, and the remaining land was opened to white settlement. With this new arrangement, the era of the Comanche reservation came to an abrupt end.

==== Captive Herman Lehmann ====
One of the most famous captives in Texas was a German boy named Herman Lehmann. He had been kidnapped by the Apache, only to escape and be rescued by the Comanche. Lehmann became the adoptive son of Quanah Parker. On August 26, 1901, Quanah Parker provided a legal affidavit verifying Lehmann's life as his adopted son 1877–1878. On May 29, 1908, the United States Congress authorized the United States Secretary of the Interior to allot Lehmann, as an adopted member of the Comanche nation, 160 acres of Oklahoma land, near Grandfield.

=== Recent history ===
Entering the Western economy was a challenge for the Comanche in the late 19th and early 20th centuries. Many tribal citizens were defrauded of whatever remained of their land and possessions. Appointed paramount chief by the United States government, Chief Quanah Parker campaigned vigorously for better deals for his people, meeting with Washington politicians frequently; and helped manage land for the tribe.

Parker became wealthy as a cattleman. He also campaigned for the Comanches' permission to practice the Native American Church religious rites, such as the usage of peyote, which was condemned by European Americans.

Before the first Oklahoma legislature, Quanah testified:

I do not think this legislature should interfere with a man's religion, also these people should be allowed to retain this health restorer. These healthy gentleman before you use peyote and those that do not use it are not so healthy.

During World War II, many Comanche left the traditional tribal lands in Oklahoma to seek jobs and more opportunities in the cities of California and the Southwest. About half of the Comanche population still lives in Oklahoma, centered on the town of Lawton.

Recently, an 80-minute 1920 silent film was "rediscovered", titled The Daughter of Dawn. It features a cast of more than 300 Comanche and Kiowa.

== Culture ==
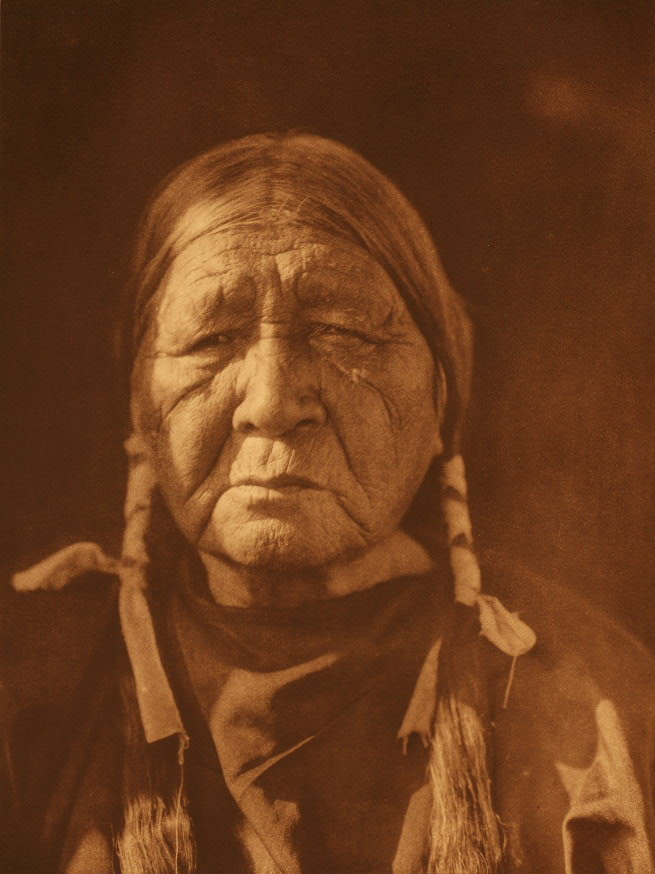
Uwat (Comanche), photograph by Edward Curtis, 1930

=== Childbirth ===
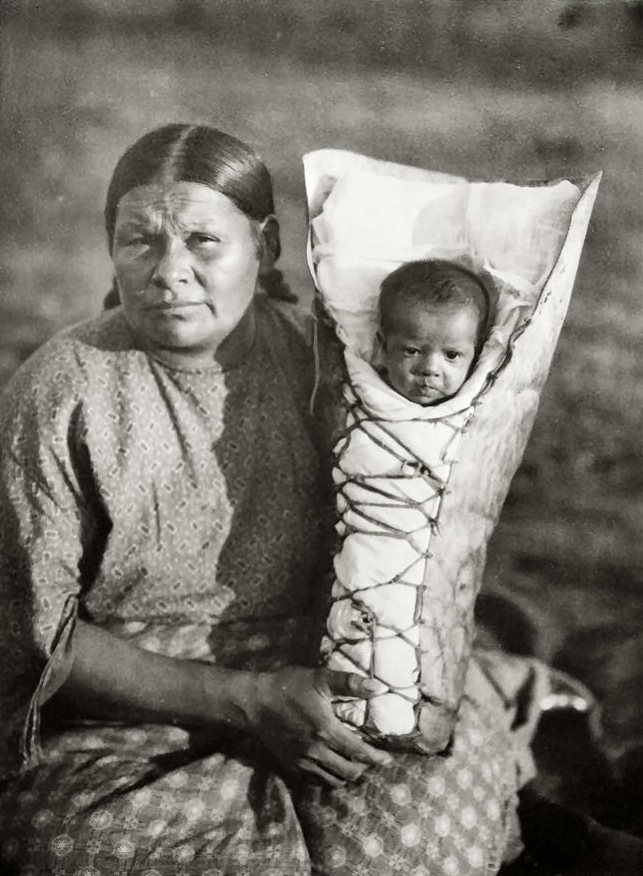
Comanche mother and baby son in cradleboard, photo by Edward Curtis

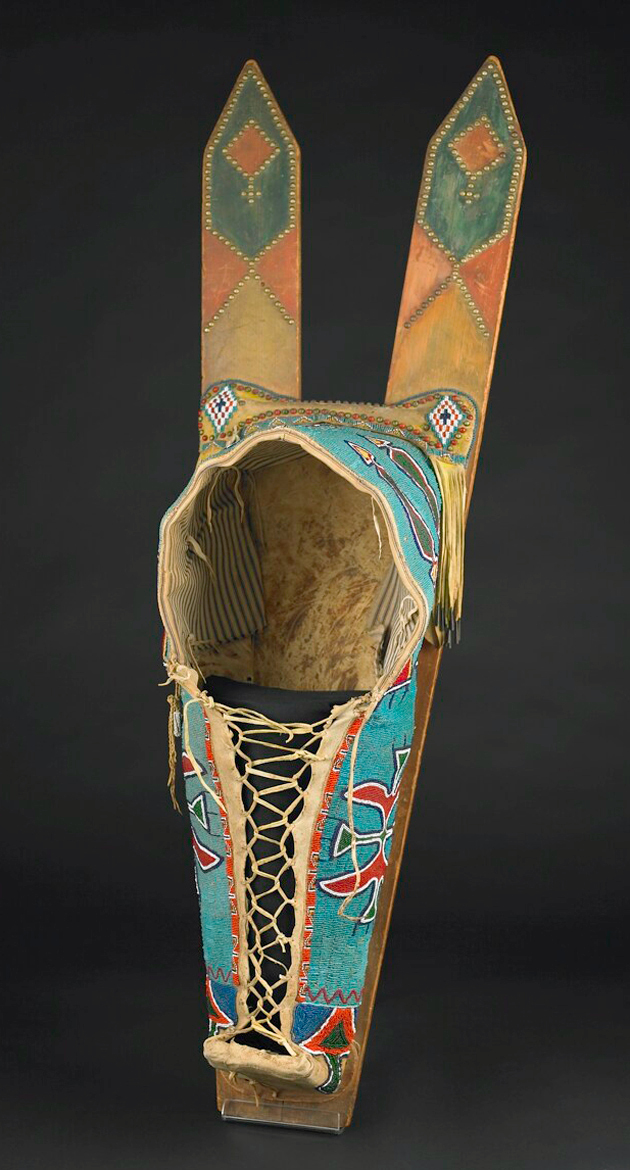
Comanche cradleboard held at the Birmingham Museum of Art

If a woman went into labor while the band was in camp, she was moved to a tipi, or a brush lodge if it was summer. One or more of the older women assisted as midwives. Men were not allowed inside the tipi during or immediately after the delivery.

First, the midwives softened the earthen floor of the tipi and dug two holes. One of the holes was for heating water and the other for the afterbirth. One or two stakes were driven into the ground near the expectant mother's bedding for her to grip during the pain of labor. After the birth, the midwives hung the umbilical cord on a hackberry tree. The people believed that if the umbilical cord was not disturbed before it rotted, the baby would live a long and prosperous life.

The newborn was swaddled and remained with its mother in the tipi for a few days. The baby was placed in a cradleboard, and the mother went back to work. She could easily carry the cradleboard on her back, or prop it against a tree where the baby could watch her while she collected seeds or roots. Cradleboards consisted of a flat board to which a basket was attached. The latter was made from rawhide straps, or a leather sheath that laced up the front. With soft, dry moss as a diaper, the young one was safely tucked into the leather pocket. During cold weather, the baby was wrapped in blankets, and then placed in the cradleboard. The baby remained in the cradleboard for about ten months; then it was allowed to crawl around.

Both girls and boys were welcomed into the band, but boys were favored. If the baby was a boy, one of the midwives informed the father or grandfather, "It's your close friend". Families might paint a flap on the tipi to tell the rest of the tribe that they had been strengthened with another warrior. Sometimes a man named his child, but mostly the father asked a medicine man (or another man of distinction) to do so. He did this in the hope of his child living a long and productive life. During the public naming ceremony, the medicine man lit his pipe and offered smoke to the heavens, earth, and each of the four directions. He prayed that the child would remain happy and healthy. He then lifted the child to symbolize its growing up and announced the child's name four times. He held the child a little higher each time he said the name. It was believed that the child's name foretold its future; even a weak or sick child could grow up to be a great warrior, hunter, and raider if given a name suggesting courage and strength. Boys were often named after their grandfather, uncle, or other relative. Girls were usually named after one of their father's relatives, but the name was selected by the mother. As children grew up they also acquired nicknames at different points in their lives, to express some aspect of their lives.

=== Children ===
The Comanche looked on their children as their most precious gift. Children were rarely punished. Sometimes, though, an older sister or other relative was called upon to discipline a child, or the parents arranged for a boogey man to scare the child. Occasionally, old people donned sheets and frightened disobedient boys and girls. Children were also told about Big Maneater Owl (Pia Mupitsi), who lived in a cave on the south side of the Wichita Mountains and ate bad children at night.

Children learned from example, by observing and listening to their parents and others in the band. As soon as she was old enough to walk, a girl followed her mother about the camp and played at the daily tasks of cooking and making clothing. She was also very close to her mother's sisters, who were called not aunt but pia, meaning mother. She was given a little deerskin doll, which she took with her everywhere. She learned to make all the clothing for the doll.

A boy identified not only with his father but with his father's family, as well as with the bravest warriors in the band. He learned to ride a horse before he could walk. By the time he was four or five, he was expected to be able to skillfully handle a horse. When he was five or six, he was given a small bow and arrows. Often, a boy was taught to ride and shoot by his grandfather, since his father and other warriors were on raids and hunts. His grandfather also taught him about his own boyhood and the history and legends of the Comanche.

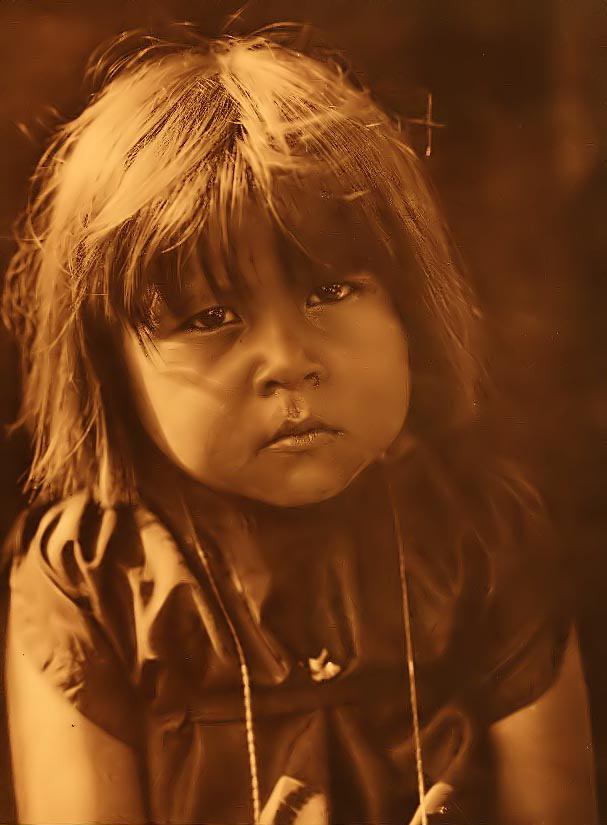
A 19th-century Comanche child

As the boy grew older, he joined the other boys to hunt birds. He eventually ranged farther from camp looking for better game to kill. Encouraged to be skillful hunters, boys learned the signs of the prairie as they learned to patiently and quietly stalk game. They became more self-reliant, yet, by playing together as a group, also formed the bonds and cooperative spirit that they would need when they hunted and raided.

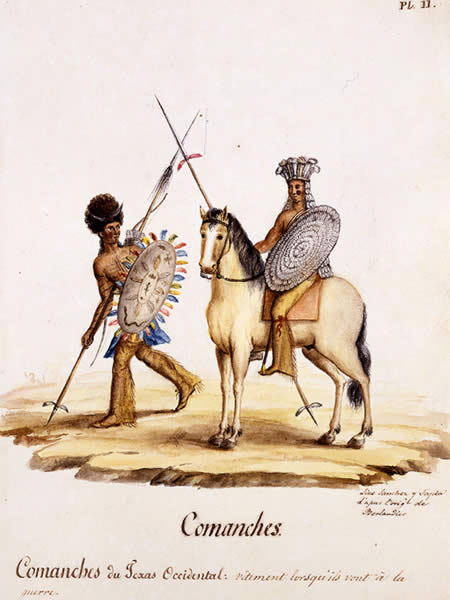
Comanches of West Texas in war regalia, c. 1830

Boys were highly respected because they would become warriors and might die young in battle. As he approached manhood, a boy went on his first buffalo hunt. If he made a kill, his father honored him with a feast. Only after he had proven himself on a buffalo hunt was a young man allowed to go to war.

When he was ready to become a warrior, at about age 15 or 16, a young man first "made his medicine" by going on a vision quest (a rite of passage). Following this quest, his father gave him a good horse to ride into battle and another mount for the trail. If he had proved himself as a warrior, a Give Away Dance might be held in his honor. As drummers faced east, the honored boy and other young men danced. His parents, along with his other relatives and the people in the band, threw presents at his feet – especially blankets and horses symbolized by sticks. Anyone might snatch one of the gifts for themselves, although those with many possessions refrained; they did not want to appear greedy. People often gave away all their belongings during these dances, providing for others in the band, but leaving themselves with nothing.

Girls learned to gather berries, nuts, and roots. They carried water and collected wood, and at about 12 years old learned to cook meals, make tipis, sew clothing, prepare hides, and perform other tasks essential to becoming a wife and mother. They were then considered ready to be married.

=== Death ===
During the 19th century, the traditional Comanche burial custom was to wrap the deceased's body in a blanket and place it on a horse, behind a rider, who would then ride in search of an appropriate burial place, such as a secure cave. After entombment, the rider covered the body with stones and returned to camp, where the mourners burned all the deceased's possessions. The primary mourner slashed his arms to express his grief. The Quahada band followed this custom longer than other bands and buried their relatives in the Wichita Mountains. Christian missionaries persuaded Comanche people to bury their dead in coffins in graveyards, which is the practice today.

=== Transportation and habitation ===
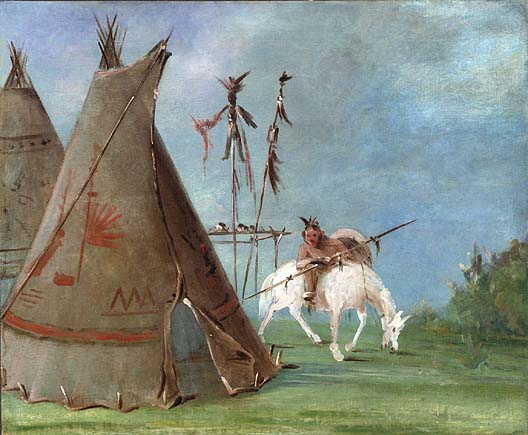
Comanche Tipis painted by George Catlin

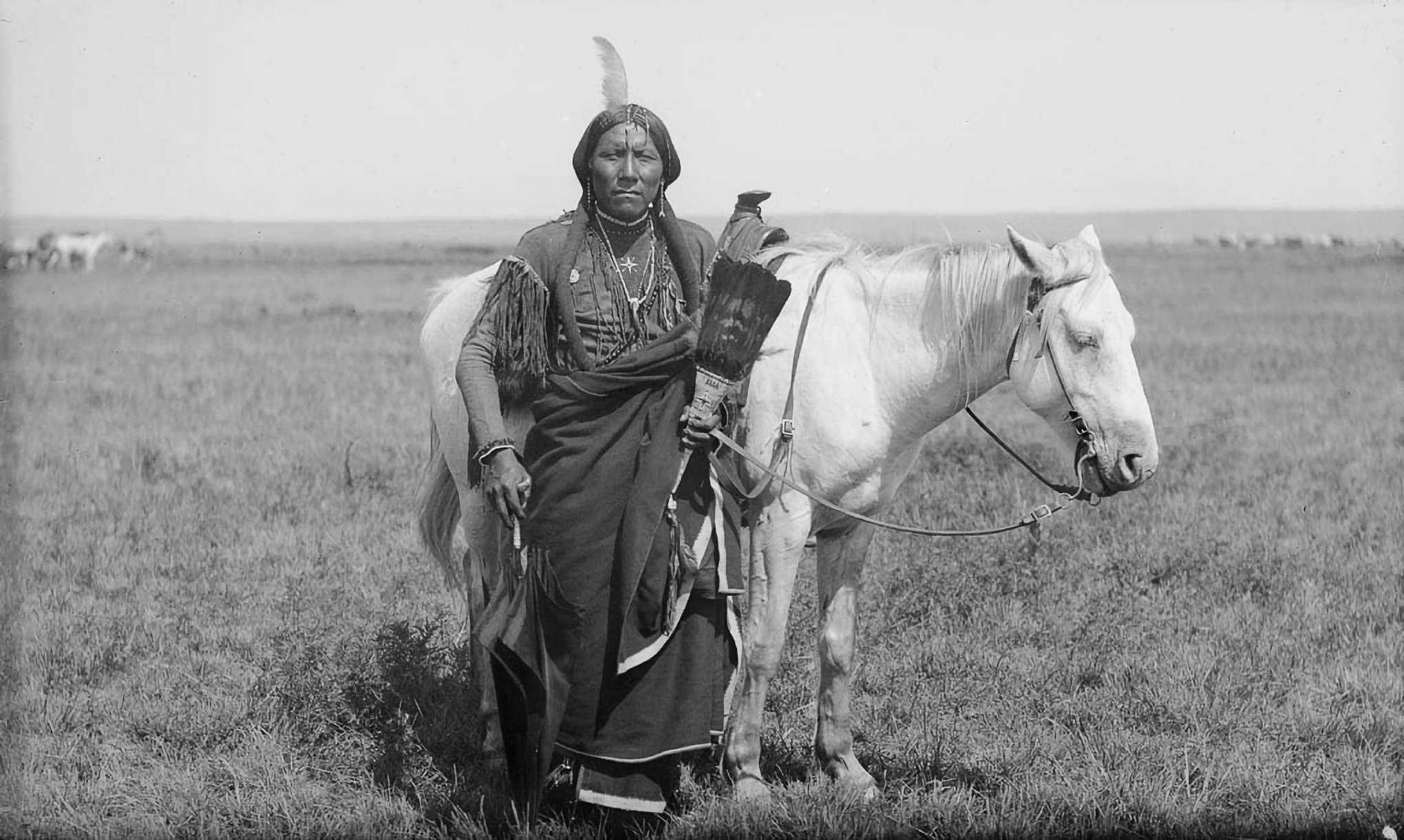
Comanche warrior Ako and horse. Photo by James Mooney, 1892

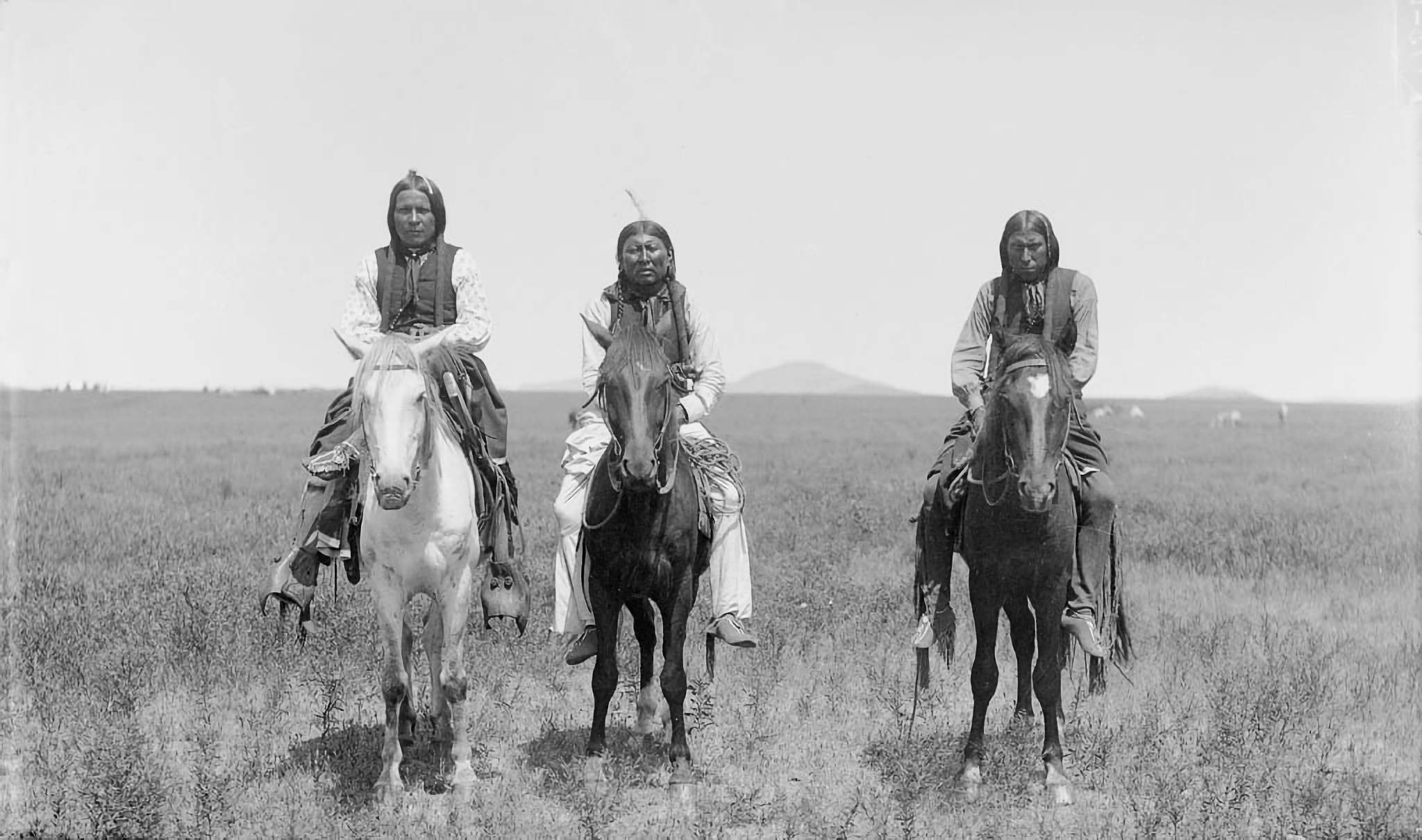
Three mounted Comanche warriors, left, Frank Moetah. Photo by James Mooney, 1892

When they lived with the Shoshone, the Comanche mainly used dog-drawn travois for transportation. Later, they acquired horses from other tribes, such as the Pueblo, and from the Spaniards. Because horses are faster, easier to control and stronger, this helped with hunting, warfare and moving camp. Larger dwellings were made due to the ability to pull and carry more belongings. Being herbivores, horses were also easier to feed than dogs, since meat was a valuable resource. The horse was of the utmost value to the Comanche. A Comanche man's wealth was measured by the size of his horse herd. Horses were prime targets to steal during raids; often raids were conducted specifically to capture horses. Often horse herds numbering in the hundreds were stolen by Comanche during raids against other Indian nations, Spanish, Mexicans, and later from the ranches of Texans. Horses were used for warfare with the Comanche being considered to be among the finest light cavalry and mounted warriors in history.

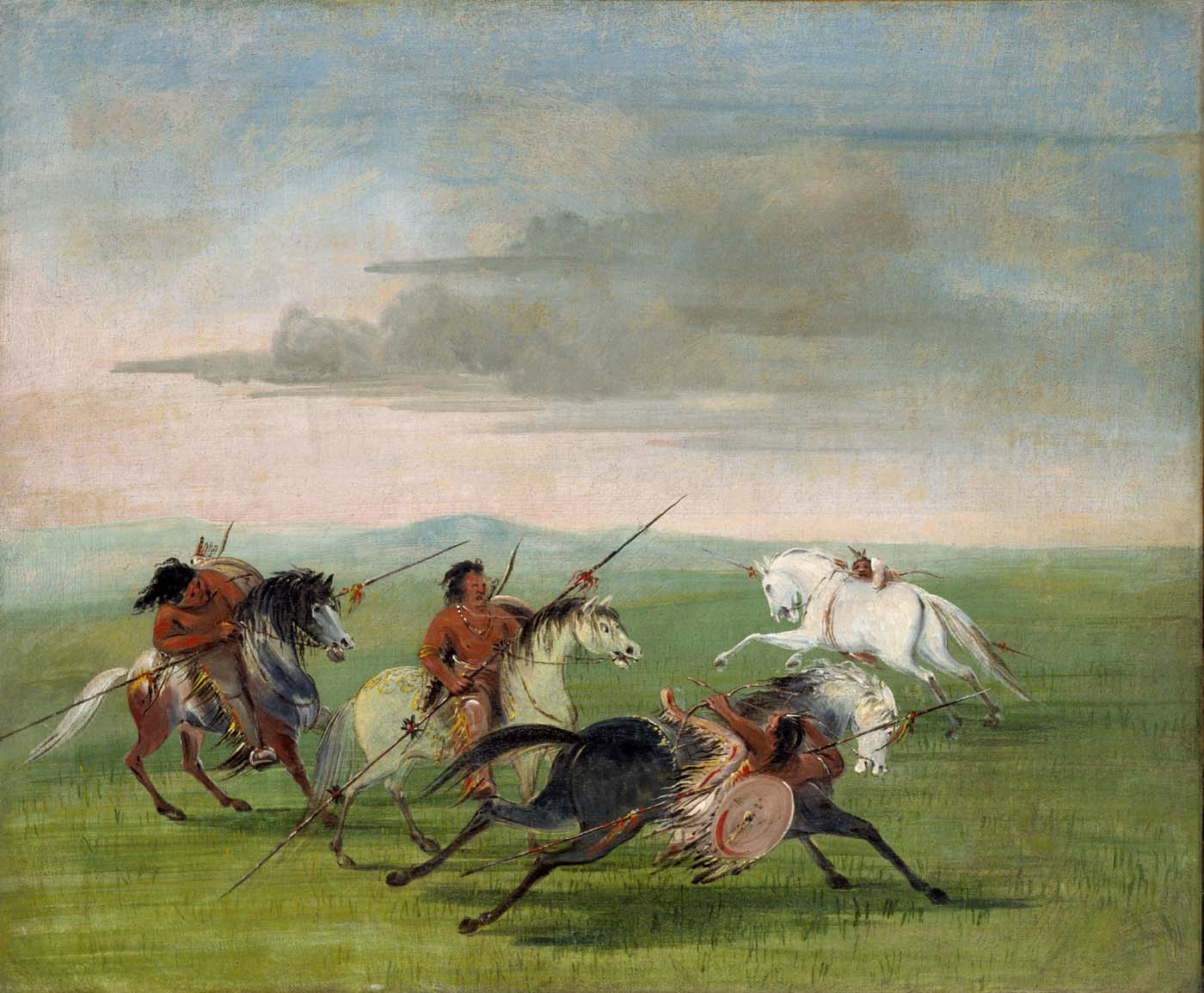
Comanche Feats of Horsemenship, George Catlin 1834

The Comanche covered their tipis with buffalo hides sewn together. To prepare the hides, women spread them on the ground, scraped off the fat and flesh with blades of bone or antler, and dried them in the sun. Then the women scraped off the thick hair and soaked the hides in water. After several days, they vigorously rubbed them in a mixture of fat, brains and liver to soften them. They softened them further by rinsing and working back and forth over a rawhide thong. Finally, they were smoked over a fire, which gave them a tan color. To finish the tipi covering, women laid the tanned hides side by side and stitched them together. As many as 22 hides could be used, but 14 was the average. The sewn cover was tied to a pole and raised, wrapped around the cone-shaped frame, and pinned with pencil-sized wooden skewers. Two wing-shaped flaps at the top of the tipi were turned back to make an opening, which could be adjusted to keep out moisture and held pockets of insulating air. With a fire pit in the center of the earthen floor, the tipis stayed warm in winter. In summer, the bottom edges of the tipis could be rolled up to let in a breeze. Cooking was done outside during hot weather. Tipis were very practical homes for nomads. Working together, women could quickly set them up or take them down. An entire Comanche band could be packed and chasing a buffalo herd within about 20 minutes. The women did most food processing and preparation.

=== Food ===
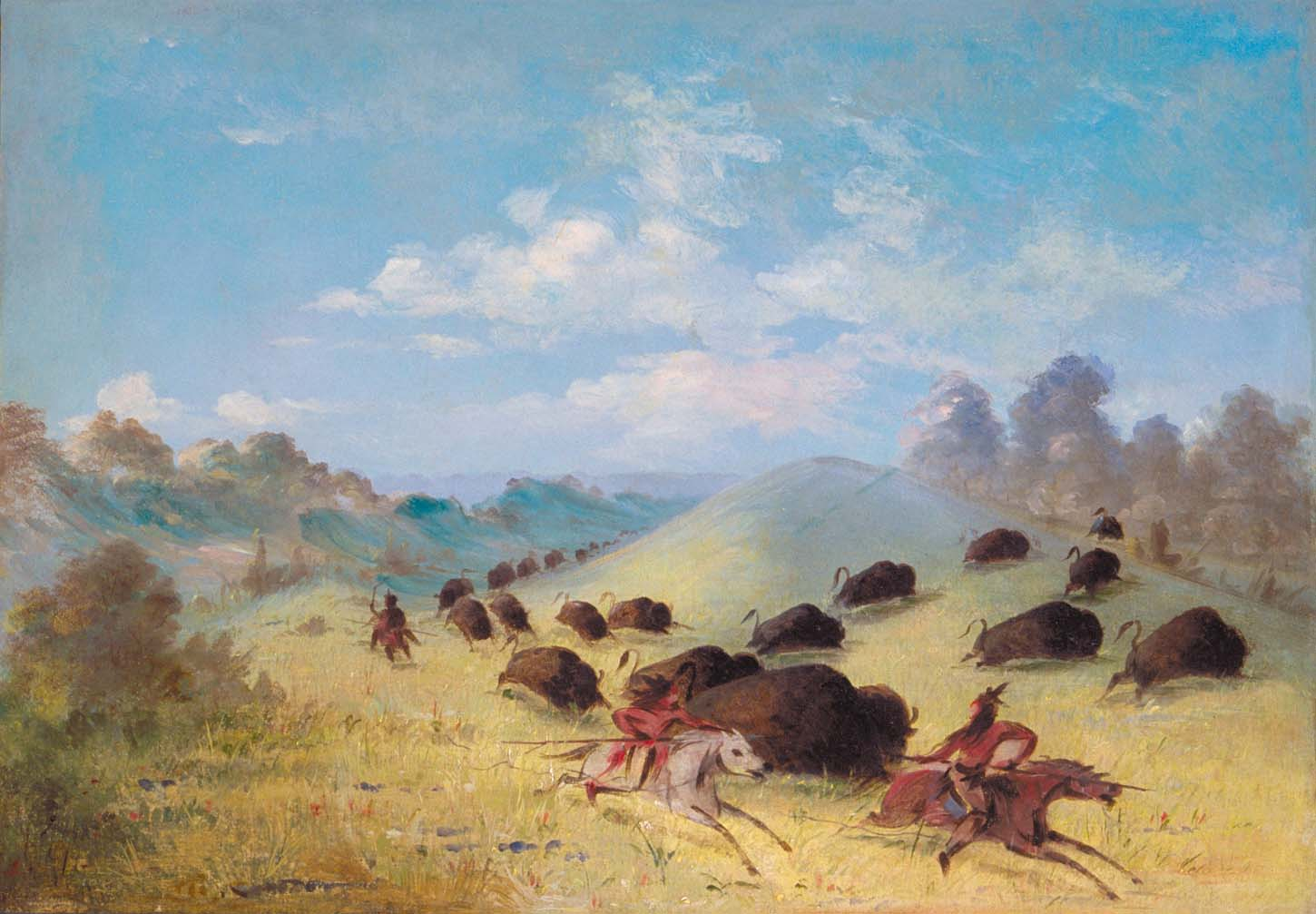
Comanches chasing bison, painted by George Catlin. Bison were the primary food source for the Comanche.

The Comanche were initially hunter-gatherers. When they lived in the Rocky Mountains, during their migration to the Great Plains, both men and women shared responsibility for gathering and providing food. When the Comanche reached the plains, hunting predominated. Hunting was considered a male activity and was a principal source of prestige. For meat, the Comanche hunted bison, elk, black bear, pronghorn, and deer. When game was scarce, the men hunted wild mustangs, and sometimes ate their own ponies. In later years the Comanche raided Texas ranches and stole longhorn cattle. They did not eat fish or fowl, unless starving.

Women prepared and cooked bison meat and other game. Women also gathered wild fruits, seeds, nuts, berries, roots and tubers, including plums, grapes, juniper berries, persimmons, mulberries, acorns, pecans, wild onions, radishes, and tuna, the fruit of the prickly pear cactus. The Comanche also acquired maize, dried pumpkin, and tobacco through trade and raids. They roasted meat over a fire or boiled it. To boil fresh or dried meat and vegetables, women dug a pit in the ground, which they lined with animal skins or bison stomach and filled with water to make a kind of cooking pot. They placed heated stones in the water until it boiled and had cooked their stew. After Spanish contact, Comanche traded for copper pots and iron kettles, which made cooking easier.

Women used berries and nuts, as well as honey and tallow, to flavor bison meat. They stored the tallow in intestine casings or rawhide pouches called oyóotû¿. They especially liked to make a sweet mush of bison marrow mixed with crushed mesquite beans.

The Comanches sometimes ate raw meat, especially raw liver flavored with gall. They also drank the milk from the slashed udders of bison, deer, and elk. Among their delicacies was the curdled milk from the stomachs of suckling bison calves. They also ate bison tripe, or stomachs.

Comanche generally ate a light meal breakfast and a large dinner. They ate during the day when they were hungry or when it was convenient. Like other Plains tribes, the Comanche were very hospitable. They prepared meals whenever a visitor arrived in camp, which led to outsiders' belief that the Comanches ate at all hours of the day or night. Many families offered thanks as they sat down to eat their meals.

Comanche children ate pemmican, but this was primarily a high-energy food reserved for war parties. Carried in a parfleche pouch, pemmican was eaten only when the men did not have time to hunt. Similarly, in camp, people ate pemmican only when other food was scarce. Traders ate pemmican sliced and dipped in honey, which they called Indian bread.

=== Clothing ===
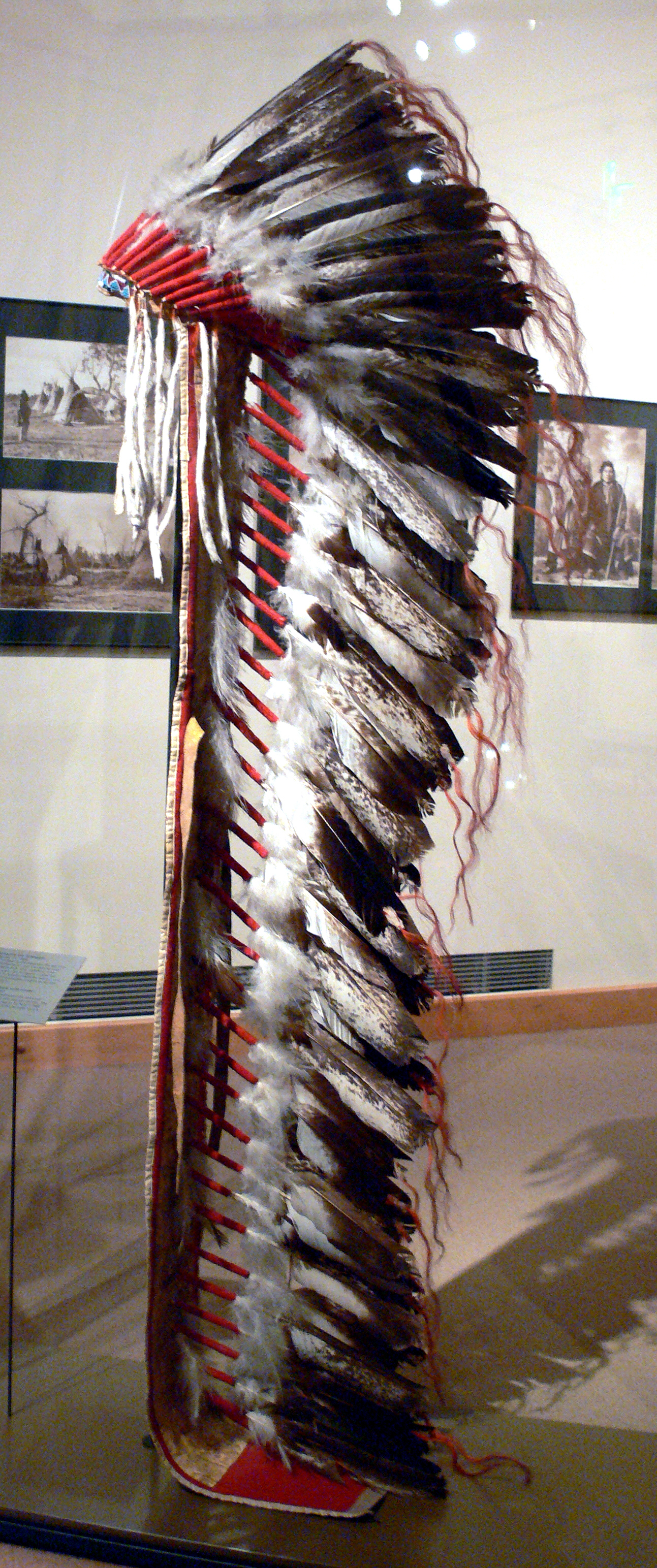
Comanche War bonnet headdress at the Ethnologisches Museum, Berlin

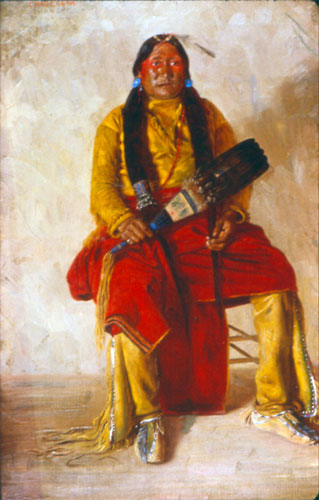
Chosequah, a Comanche warrior wearing full traditional regalia. Painted by E. A. Burbank, 1897.

Comanche clothing was simple and easy to wear. Men wore a leather belt with a breechcloth — a long piece of buckskin brought up between the legs and looped over and under the belt at the front and back, and loose-fitting deerskin leggings. Moccasins had soles made from thick, tough buffalo hide with soft deerskin uppers. Men wore nothing on the upper body, except in winter when they wore heavy robes of buffalo hide (or occasionally, bear, wolf, or coyote skins) with knee-length buffalo-hide boots. Young boys usually went naked except in cold weather. By age 8 or 9, they wore adult clothing. In the 19th century, men had replaced the buckskin breechcloths by woven cloth, and wore loose-fitting buckskin shirts. Women wore long deerskin dresses with a flared skirt and wide, long sleeves, with buckskin fringes on the sleeves and hem. Beads and pieces of metal were attached in geometric patterns. Women wore buckskin moccasins with buffalo soles. Women decorated their shirts, leggings and moccasins with fringes of deer-skin, animal fur, and human hair. They also decorated their shirts and leggings with patterns and shapes of beads and scraps of material. In winter they, too, wore warm buffalo robes and tall, fur-lined buffalo-hide boots. Unlike boys, girls old enough to walk were dressed in breechcloths. By age 12 or 13, they wore women's clothing.

=== Hair and headgear ===
Comanche people took pride in their hair, which was worn long. They arranged it with porcupine quill brushes, greased it and parted it in the center from the forehead to the back of the neck. They painted the scalp along the parting with yellow, red, or white clay (or other colors). They wore their hair in two long braids tied with leather thongs or colored cloth, and sometimes wrapped with beaver fur. They also braided a strand of hair from the top of their head. This slender braid, called a scalp lock, was decorated with colored scraps of cloth and beads, and a single feather. Comanche men rarely wore anything on their heads. Only after they moved onto a reservation late in the 19th century did men begin to wear the typical Plains headdress. In severe cold, they might wear a brimless, woolly buffalo hide hat. At war, some warriors wore a headdress of buffalo scalp. Warriors cut away most of the hide and flesh from a buffalo head, leaving only a portion of the woolly head and the horns. This type of hat was worn only by the Comanche. Women did not let their hair grow as long as the men did. Young women might wear their hair long and braided, but women parted their hair in the middle and kept it short. Like the men, they painted their scalp along the parting with bright paint.

=== Body decoration ===
Comanche men usually had pierced ears with hanging earrings made of pieces of shell or loops of brass or silver wire. A female relative would pierce the outer edge of the ear with six or eight holes. The men also tattooed their face, arms, and chest with geometric designs, and painted their face and body. Traditionally they used paints made of berry juice and the colored clays of the Comancheria. Later, traders supplied them with vermilion (red pigment) and bright grease paints. Men wore bands of leather and strips of metal on their arms. Except for black, which was the color for war, there was no standard color or pattern for face and body painting: it was a matter of individual preference. For example, one man might paint one side of his face white and the other side red; another might paint one side of his body green and the other side with green and black stripes. One Comanche might always paint himself in a particular way, while another might change the colors and designs when so inclined. Some designs had special meaning to the individual, and special colors and designs might have been revealed in a dream. Women might also tattoo their face or arms. They were fond of painting their bodies and were free to do so as they pleased. It was popular for women to paint the insides of their ears a bright red and paint great orange and red circles on their cheeks. They usually painted red and yellow around their lips.

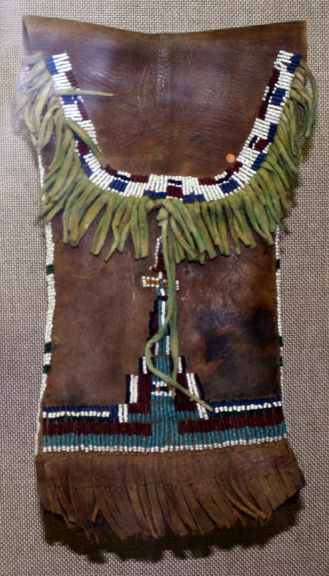
Comanche beaded ration bag, c. 1880, collection of the Oklahoma History Center

=== Art and material culture ===
Because of their frequent nomadic traveling, Comanche had to make sure that their household goods and other possessions were unbreakable. They did not use pottery that could easily be broken on long journeys. Weaving, wood carving, and metal working were unknown. Instead, they depended on buffalo for most of their tools, household goods, and weapons. They made nearly 200 different utilitarian items from the horns, hide, and bones.

Removing the lining of the inner stomach, women made the paunch into a water bag. The lining was stretched over four sticks and filled with water to make a pot for cooking soups and stews. With wood scarce on the plains, women relied on buffalo chips (dried dung) as fuel for cooking and heat.

Stiff rawhide was fashioned into saddles, stirrups and cinches, knife cases, buckets, and moccasin soles. Rawhide was also made into rattles and drums. Strips of rawhide were twisted into sturdy ropes. Scraped to resemble white parchment, rawhide skins were folded to make parfleches in which food, clothing, and other personal belongings were kept. Women also tanned hides to make soft and supple buckskin, which was used for tipi covers, warm robes, blankets, cloths, and moccasins. They used buckskin for bedding, cradles, dolls, bags, pouches, quivers, and gun cases.

Sinew was used for bowstrings and sewing thread. Hooves were turned into glue and rattles. Horns were shaped into cups, spoons, and ladles, while the tail made a whip, fly-swatter, or a tipi decoration. Men made tools, scrapers, needles, pipes and children's toys from the bones. But men concentrated on making bows and arrows, lances, and shields. The thick neck skin of an old bull was ideal for war shields that deflected arrows as well as bullets. Since they spent most of each day on horseback, they also fashioned leather into saddles, stirrups, and other equipment for their mounts. Buffalo hair was used to fill saddle pads and was used in rope and halters.

=== Language ===
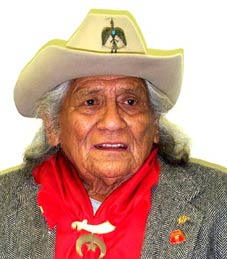
Charles Chibitty, Comanche code talker in World War II

The Comanche language (Nʉmʉ tekwapʉ̱), as spoken by the Comanche people, is a Numic language of the Uto-Aztecan language group, closely related to the language of the Shoshone, from which the Comanche diverged around 1700. The two languages remain closely related, but a few low-level sound changes inhibit mutual intelligibility. The earliest records of Comanche from 1786 clearly show a dialect of Shoshone, but by the beginning of the 20th century, these sound changes had modified the way Comanche sounded in subtle, but profound, ways. Although efforts are now being made to ensure survival of the language, most of its speakers are elderly, and less than 1% of the Comanches can speak it.

In the late 19th century, many Comanche children were placed in boarding schools with children from different tribes. The children were taught English and discouraged from speaking their native language. Anecdotally, enforcement of speaking English was severe.

Quanah Parker learned and spoke English and was adamant that his own children do the same. The second generation then grew up speaking English, because it was believed that it was better for them not to know Comanche.

Comanches were among the Native Americans who were first utilized as code talkers by the U.S. Army during World War I.

During World War II, a group of 17 young men, referred to as "the Comanche code talkers", were trained and used by the U.S. Army to send messages conveying sensitive information that could not be deciphered by the Germans.

== Notable Comanches ==
=== Historic Comanche people ===
These are notable Comanche people from the 18th and 19th centuries, prior to allotment.

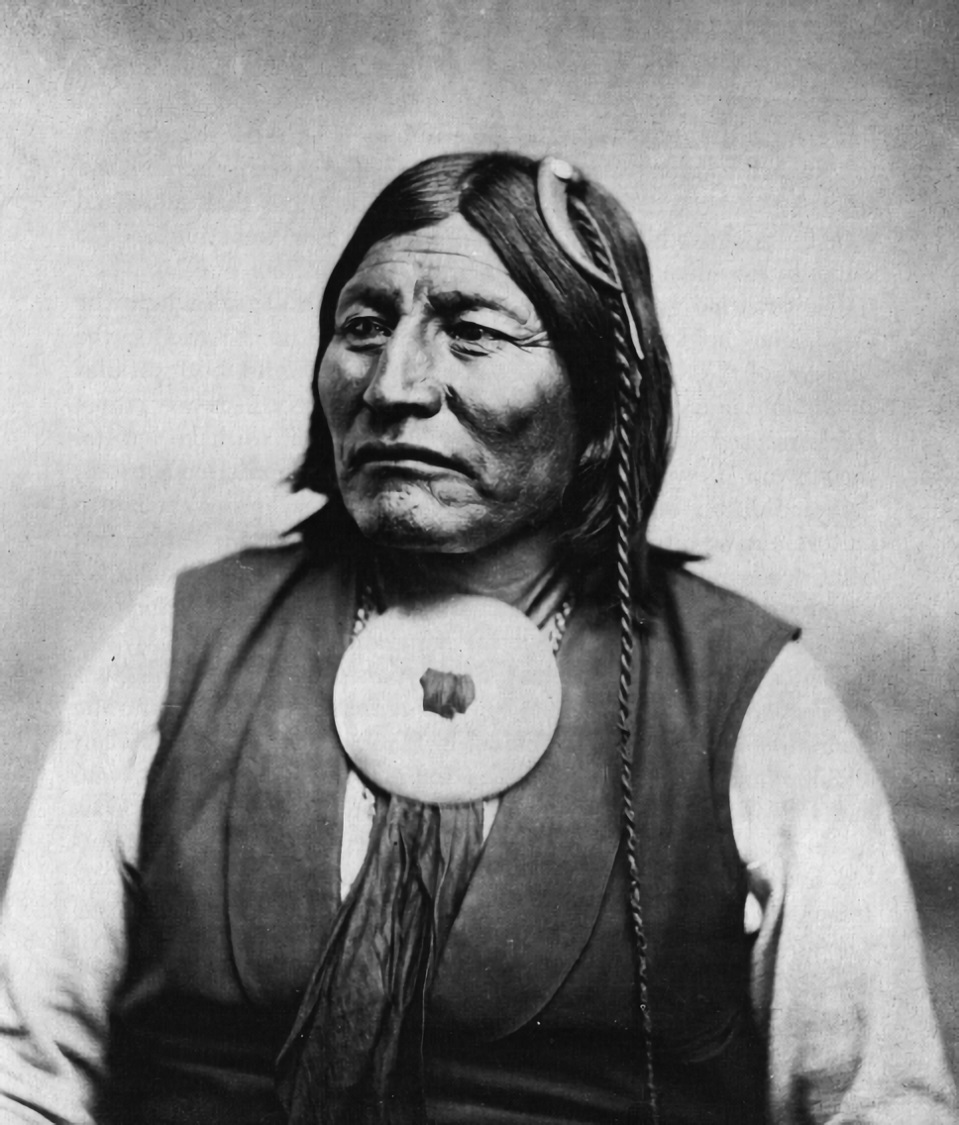
Mo'o-wai ("Pushing aside" or "Pushing-in-the-middle"), aka "Shaking Hand", chief of the Kotsoteka

- Amorous Man (Pahayoko) (late 1780s – c. 1860), Penateka chief
- Black Horse (died ca. 1900), second chief of the Quahadi band
- Buffalo Hump (Potsʉnakwahipʉ) (c. 1800 – c. 1865/1870), war chief and later head chief of the Penateka division
- Carne Muerto, Tehcap (1832–1860s), Quahadi war chief
- Tavibo Naritgant, Cuerno Verde (died 1779), war chief
- Horseback (Tʉhʉyakwahipʉ) (c. 1805/1810 – c. 1888), chief of the Nokoni band
- Iron Jacket (Puhihwikwasu'u) (c. 1790 – 1858), war chief and later head chief of the Quahadi band; father of Peta Nocona
- Isatai (c. 1840–c. 1890), warrior and medicine man of the Quahadi
- Mow-way (Shaking Hand, Pushing-in-the-Middle) (c. 1825 – 1886), Kotsoteka chief
- Old Owl (Mupitsukupʉ) (late 1780s – 1849), Penateka chief
- Peta Nocona (Lone Wanderer) (c. 1820 – c. 1864), chief of the Quahadi division; father of Quanah Parker
- Quanah Parker (c. 1845 – 1911), Quahadi chief, a founder of Native American Church and rancher
- White Parker (1887–1956), son of Quanah Parker and Methodist missionary
- Piaru-ekaruhkapu (Big Red Meat) (ca. 1820/1825 – 1875), Nokoni chief
- Sanapia (1895–1984), medicine woman
- Santa Anna (c. 1800 – c. 1849), war chief of the Penateka Band
- Spirit Talker (Mukwooru) (c. 1780 – 1840), Penateka chief and medicine man
- Ten Bears (Pawʉʉrasʉmʉnunʉ) (c. 1790 – 1872), chief of the Ketahto band and later of the entire Yamparika division
- Tomassa (c. 1840–1900), translator
- Tosawi (White Knife) (c. 1805/1810 – c. 1878/1880), chief of the Penateka band
- Yellow Wolf (Isa-viah) (c. 1800/1805 – 1854), war chief of the Penateka division

=== Notable Comanche captives ===
- Bianca Babb (1856–1950), American woman and captive of Comanche
- Cynthia Ann Parker (1827–1863), American captive, wife of Peta Nocona, mother of Quanah Parker
- Dolly (mother), Martha (daughter, 1835-1927), and Booker (son) Webster, Republic of Texas

=== Comanche Nation citizens ===
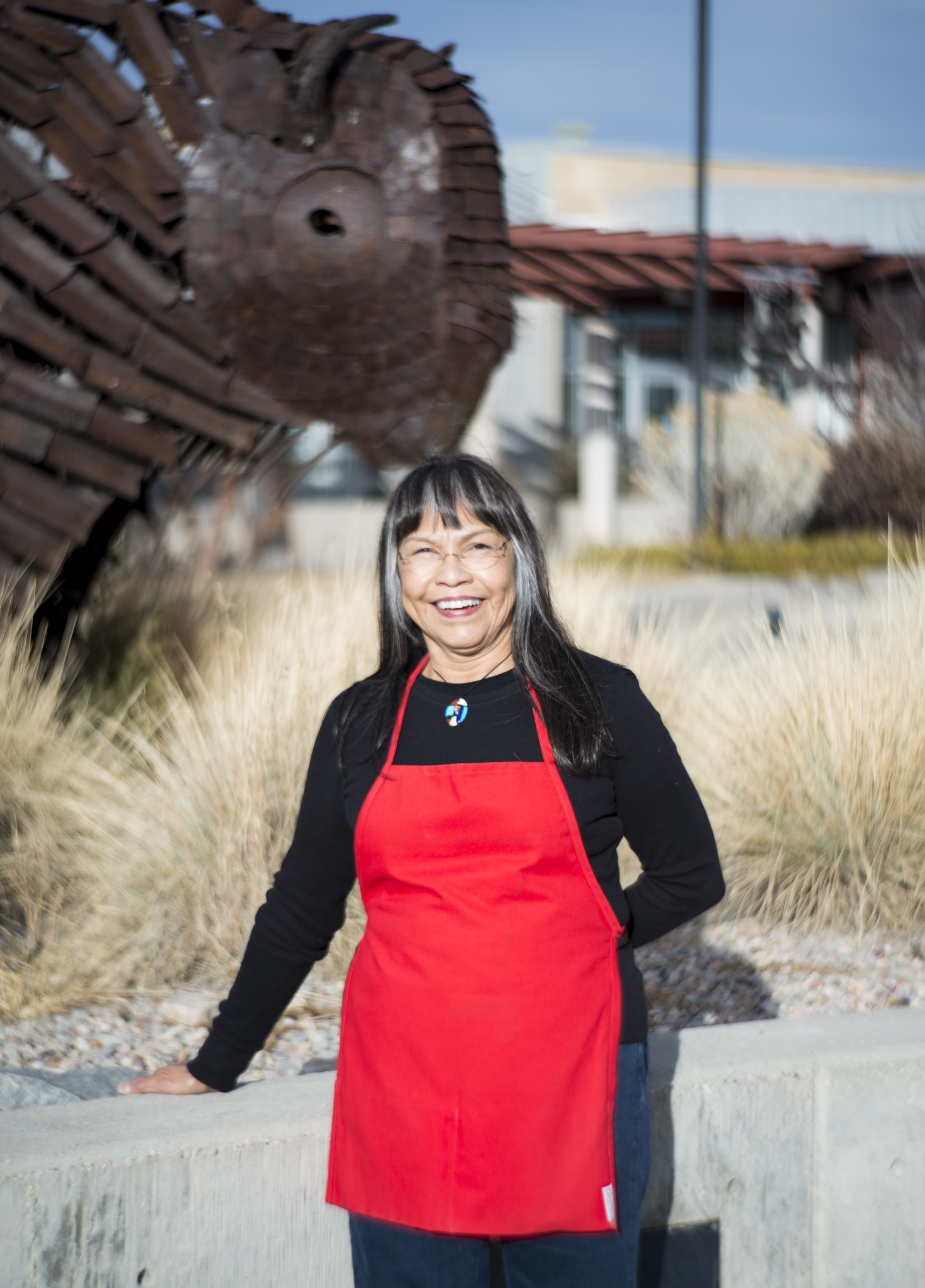
Karita Coffey (Comanche Nation) professor, ceramic artist, and sculptor at the Institute of American Indian Arts, Santa Fe, New Mexico, 2014

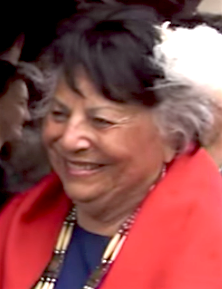
LaDonna Harris, Comanche activist and founder of Americans for Indian Opportunity

These are 20th- and 21st-century citizens of the Comanche Nation.

- Charon Asetoyer (born 1951), activist and women's health advocate
- Chad Gable (born 1986), professional wrestler
- Charles Chibitty (1921–2005), World War II Comanche code talker
- Karita Coffey, Tsat-Tah Mo-oh Kahn (born 1947), ceramic artist, professor, sculptor
- Marie C. Cox (1920–2005), founder of the North American Indian Women's Association and foster care reform advocate
- Jesse Ed Davis (1944–1988), guitarist and recording artist
- LaDonna Harris (born 1931), political activist and founder of Americans for Indian Opportunity
- Rance Hood (1941–2024), artist
- Janee' Kassanavoid (born 1995), athlete (hammer throw)
- Dorothy Sunrise Lorentino (1909–2005), educator, activist, sister of Morris Tabbyyetchy.
- Doc Tate Nevaquaya (1932–1996), Flatstyle painter, Native American flute-player, NEA fellow
- Sonny Nevaquaya (d. 2019), Native American flute-player
- Diane O'Leary (1939–2013), artist, nurse
- Lotsee Patterson (born 1931), librarian, educator, and founder of the American Indian Library Association
- Paul Chaat Smith, Comanche/Choctaw author, curator
- George Tahdooahnippah "Comanche Boy" (born 1978), professional boxer and NABC super middleweight champion
- Josephine Wapp (1912–2014), professor, regalia maker, textile artist
- David Yeagley (1951–2014), classical composer, political writer

== Population history ==
In 1832 Comanche chiefs told George Catlin that the tribe numbered up to 40,000 people, being able to muster up to 8,000 warriors. In 1774 a French trader, J. Gaignard, wrote that one division of the Comanche (the Naytane, also known as Yamparika) had 4,000 warriors divided into four bands which were never together. In 1786 Spaniards estimated that the Comanches may have numbered up to 30,000. Jedidiah Morse around year 1820 estimated the Comanche at between 38,000 and 41,000. In 1819 three bands of the Comanche were reported as 2,500 warriors. Indian Affairs 1837 reported 19,200 people. Charles Bent in 1847 reported that they had 2,500 lodges. Indian Affairs 1849 reported them as 4,000 warriors and 20,000 total population. Around the mid-19th century A. W. Whipple, E. Domenech and H. Howe all reported that the Comanche numbered up to 30,000. The Texas State Historical Association places the mid-19th century population at 10,000. The Comanche population apparently rapidly declined in the 2nd half of the 19th century. The census of 1890 found only 1,598 in Oklahoma. According to Indian Affairs there were 1,507 (in 1895), 1,499 (in 1900), 1401 (in 1905) and 1,476 (in 1910). The census of 1910 reported only 1,171.

Comanche population has rebounded in the 20th and 21st centuries. There are 17,000 Comanche Nation citizens. In the 2020 US census, 39,808 Americans stated they were Comanche.

== See also ==
- Quanah Parker Star House

== Sources ==
- Kavanagh, Thomas W. (1996). The Comanches: A History 1706–1875. Lincoln, Nebraska: University of Nebraska Press. ISBN 978-0-8032-7792-2.
- Kroeker, Marvin E. (1997). Comanches and Mennonites on the Oklahoma Plains: A.J. and Magdalena Becker and the Post Oak Mission. Fresno, CA: Centers for Mennonite Brethren Studies. ISBN 0-921788-42-8.
- McLaughlin, John E. (1992). "A Counter-Intuitive Solution in Central Numic Phonology". International Journal of American Linguistics. 58 (2): 158–181. doi:10.1086/ijal.58.2.3519754. JSTOR 3519754. S2CID 148250257.
- McLaughlin, John E. (2000). Casad, Gene; Willett, Thomas (eds.). "Language Boundaries and Phonological Borrowing in the Central Numic Languages". Uto-Aztecan: Structural, Temporal, and Geographic Perspectives. Sonora, Mexico: Friends of Uto-Aztecan Universidad de Sonora, División de Humanidades y Bellas Artes, Hermosillo. ISBN 970-689-030-0.
- Meadows, William C (2003). Kiowa, Apache, and Comanche Military Societies: Enduring Veterans, 1800 to the Present. University of Texas Press. ISBN 978-0-292-70518-0.
- Rollings, William H.; Deer, Ada E (2004). The Comanche. Chelsea House Publishers. ISBN 978-0-7910-8349-9.
- Swan, Daniel C. (1999). Peyote Religious Art: Symbols of Faith and Belief. Jackson, Mississippi: University of Mississippi Press. ISBN 1-57806-096-6.
- Wallace, Ernest; Hoebel, E. Adamson (1952). The Comanche: Lords of the Southern Plains. Norman, OK: University of Oklahoma Press. ISBN 9780806102498. OCLC 1175397.
- Nye, Wilbur Sturtevant. Carbine and Lance: The Story of Old Fort Sill, University of Oklahoma Press, Norman, 1983
- Leckie, William H.. The Buffalo Soldiers: A Narrative of the Negro Cavalry in the West, University of Oklahoma Press, Norman, 1967
- Fowler, Arlen L.. The Black Infantry in the West, 1869–1891, University of Oklahoma Press, Norman, 1996
