= Diane O'Leary =

Native American artist from Oklahoma (1939–2013)

- Born: 1939; Waco, Texas, United States
- Died: 2013 (aged 73–74)
- Other name: Opeche-Nah-S
- Citizenship: Comanche Nation and U.S.
- Education: Texas Christian University (BA, BS, MS); Bacone College; Harvard University (MS); Stanford University (MA, MFA, PhD)
- Occupation: painting
- Known for: female Native figures

Diane O’Leary (Opeche-Nah-Se), PhD (1939–2013), was a Native American multimedia artist, half Irish and half Comanche. Her work advocates for the equality and dignity of the oppressed and misused, including Native Americans, women, and the environment. She is most known for her female native figures pieces, combining her scientific education and creative talents to create abstract yet accurate body portraits. O'Leary's latest work was a collage series advocating for the poor environmental state of Oregon's Tillamook Bay.

== Background ==
Diane O’Leary was born in Waco, Texas to an Irish father and Comanche mother. Growing up during the Great Depression developed her artistic craft and style, learning to be thrifty and resourceful with what was available. These experiences were the base to her later artistic career, being recognized internationally for her weaving, quilting, lithography, printmaking and tapestry art.

O’Leary was a noted piano prodigy as a child and later went on to study Baroque literature in college. She also studied nursing and archaeology. Despite all her continued education which included Texas Christian University (BA, BS, MS), Bacone College, Harvard University (MS), and Stanford University (MA, MFA, PhD), O’Leary never had institutional training in the fine arts. She nevertheless managed to intertwine her artistic passions into her scholarly studies. While a nurse, she became a medical artist, drawing what she observed in surgeries and creating technology to improve the procedures. She also conducted environmental research on Oregon's Tillamook Bay for a Congressional proposal for wetland preservation.

== Art work ==
O’Leary's involvement with the Tillamook Bay proposal inspired her to create a collage series promoting the Bay's wildlife entitled The Living Waters of Tillamook Bay. Congress accepted her proposal and her collage series became its own exhibit at the Oregon Coast Aquarium in 2005. The project was conducted in the ancient Japanese printing technique called Gyotaku. She learned Japanese during this time in order to communicate personally with Japanese Gyotaku artists.

O’Leary's style borders on the abstract yet keeps to the proportionate makeup of her subjects, combining her scientific and artistic techniques. O'Leary periodically studied under famed Bacone College art instructor, Dick West, which was the extent of her formal art training. O’Leary studied under the guidance of professional artists while living in Santa Fe, New Mexico. These artists included Emil Bisttram, Eric Gibberd, and Linton Kistler, who she developed further painting skills and learned lithography from. O’Leary's interactions with Georgia O'Keeffe, influenced O’Leary's botanical pieces. Other's such as Helen Frankenthaler and Louise Nevelson influenced her art's modernist flair. O’Leary took these influences and combined them with her personal style, allowing her own cultural heritage to be presented. She is best known for her figure studies of Native American women, representing them in their historical context through her own non-traditional style. Her work advocates for the equality and dignity of the oppressed and misused, including Native Americans, women, and the environment.

== Accomplishments ==
O’Leary's work has been displayed internationally in public galleries as well as private collections. Her pieces have been included in collections throughout the United States including the National Estuary Program in Washington D.C. Her work has also been used in television shows and film sets.

== Featured in ==
- "Earth Song, Moon Dreams: Paintings by American Indian Women," by Patricia Janis Broder
- Arizona Highways (magazine), September 1972
- Oregon Art Beat, www.opb.org
- "Contemporary Southwest Jewelry," by Diana Pardue, Heard Museum
- "American Indian Crafts and Culture," Volume 7 no.3, March 1973
- The Scottsdale Daily Progress, March 1975
- The Indian Trader, July 1978

== Public collections ==
- Berne Museum, Berne, Switzerland
- Oregon Coast Aquarium, Newport, Oregon
- Denver Art Museum, Colorado
- Solomon R. Guggenheim Museum, New York, New York
- Heard Museum, Phoenix, Arizona
- Museum of American Indian, Heye Foundation in New York
- Mitchell Indian Museum, Kendall College, Evanston, Illinois
- Millicent Rogers Foundation Museum, Taos, New Mexico
- Philbrook Art Center, Tulsa, Oklahoma
- Peabody Museum of Archaeology and Ethnology, Harvard University, Cambridge, Massachusetts
- Stanford University, California
- Wheelwright Museum of the American Indian, Santa Fe, New Mexico
