= Rance Hood =

Native American artist from Oklahoma (1941–2024)

- Au Tup Ta (Yellow Hair)
- Born: 1941; Lawton, Oklahoma
- Died: August 30, 2024 (aged 82–83); Lawton, Oklahoma
- Resting place: Comanche Cemetery, Indiahoma, Oklahoma
- Citizenship: Comanche
- Education: Self-taught
- Known for: Artist, Designer, Sculptor, Medicine Man
- Style: Mystic painter
- Website: Rancehoodgallery.com

Rance Hood is an Oklahoma Native artist who echoes traditional Native American culture in his paintings. A self-taught artist, Hood was raised by his maternal grandparents who exposed him to Comanche Indian ways and values.

== Early life ==
Rance Hood was born in the farmlands between Cache and Indiahoma, Oklahoma to a Comanche mother and white father. Hood was the only one of his six siblings to stay with his Comanche maternal grandparents. As a child, Hood and his brother rode horses at their uncle's farm.

== Career ==
Hood eventually started working for Krauss Printing Company.

== Style and theme ==
Hood remained loyal to the traditional art style of Indian art passed down from his ancestors. He started out using oils to achieve a look of depth and eventually transitioned to acrylics.

=== Awards ===
Over the years, Hood's work has been recognized by numerous awards and prizes. Some of these awards include:

- 1962 Second and Third, American Indian Exposition, Anadarko, Oklahoma
- 1963 First, Second, and Third, American Indian Exposition, Anadarko, Oklahoma
- 1964 First and Second, American Indian Exposition, Anadarko, Oklahoma
- 1965 Grand Award and First, American Indian Exposition, Anadarko, Oklahoma
- 1966 Grand Award, Second and Third, American Indian Exposition, Anadarko, Oklahoma
- Second, Gallup Inter-Tribal Ceremonial, Gallup, New Mexico
- Honorable Mention, Texas-Oklahoma, sidewalk art show, Oklahoma City, Oklahoma
- 1968 War Dance, Honorable Mention, Philbrook Art Center, Tulsa, Oklahoma
- 1969 Second and Grand Award, American Indian Exposition, Anadarko, Oklahoma
- The Comanche, Honorable Mention, Philbrook Art Center, Tulsa, Oklahoma
- 1970 Eagle Dance, First, Philbrook Art Center, Tulsa, Oklahoma
- 1972 Grand Award, American Indian Exposition, Anadarko, Oklahoma
- 1985 Western Writers Cover Art Award
- American Artists Lithograph Competition for Poster Art
- 1986 Award of Merit, Colors of the Heartland
- Reyna's Galleries, San Juan Bautista, California
- First Anniversary Indian Market, First Place and Special Award, Santa Fe, New Mexico
- Artists Out of Your Gourd, Ribbon, Charity auction of painted gourds, Santa Fe, New Mexico

=== Commissions ===
- 1971 Designs for Theater Sets, Indian Theater Ensemble at Cafe La Mama Theater, New York City, New York
- 1987 Film Indian, Sculpture, American Indian Film Festival anniversary award
- Medallion, Comanche Nation Commemorative Emblem, Franklin Mint
- To Father Sky Mother Earth, poster, Oglala Sioux Rights Fund
- Eagle, exterior design, Turbo West Aircraft Company, Cheyenne III Jet, Broomfield, Colorado
- 1989 Wooden Easter Egg for Easter at the White House, American artists egg exhibit
- 1990 Fleeing from the Spirit Winds and Emerging Power, posters, published by the American Indian Film Festival, XIV
- 2005 Illustrations for Blood of Our Earth: Poetic History of the American Indian by Dan C. Jones, University of New Mexico Press, Albuquerque
- 2005 Palo Duro Holocaust, mural for Comanche Nation Tribal Museum, Lawton, Oklahoma

=== Private collections ===
Hood's work is featured in several private collections, some of which include:

- Al Unser Jr.
- Reba McEntire
- Stevie Nicks
- Carlos Santana
- Jimmy Connors
- Joe Walsh
- Johnny Rodriguez
- Joseph Coors
- Michael Martin Murphey
