= George Tahdooahnippah =

Native American boxer

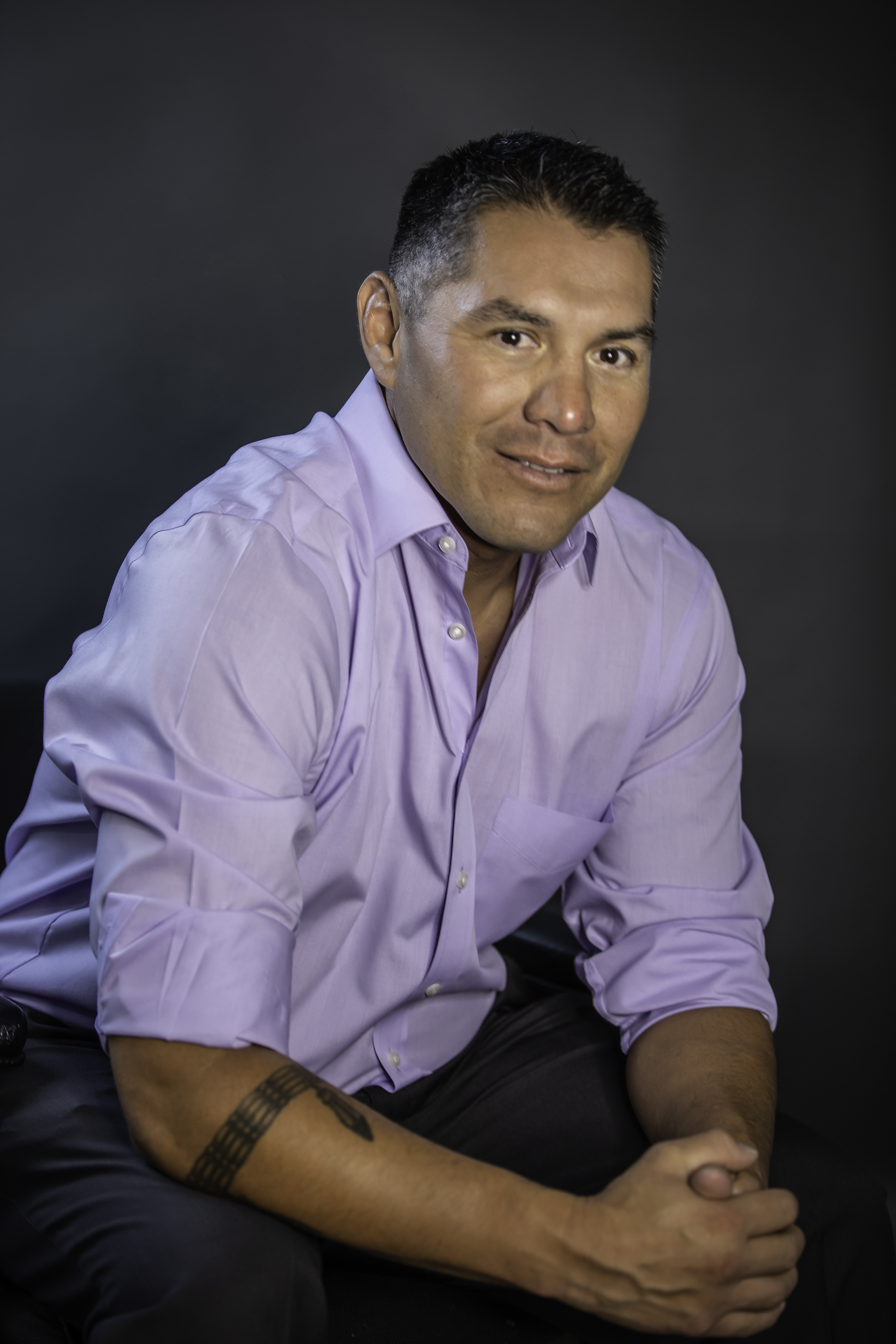

Personal information
- Nickname: Comanche Boy
- Nationality: Comanche Nation, American
- Born: December 3, 1978 (age 47) Colorado, United States
- Height: 5 ft 10 in (178 cm)
- Weight: Light Heavyweight; Super Middleweight; Middleweight

Boxing career
- Reach: 73 in (185 cm)
- Stance: Orthodox

Boxing record
- Total fights: 42
- Wins: 34
- Win by KO: 24
- Losses: 3
- Draws: 3
- No contests: 2

George "Comanche Boy" Tahdooahnippah (born December 3, 1978) is a Native American professional boxer. He has held the WBC Continental Americas middleweight and Native American Boxing Council super middleweight titles. He also works as an environment and diabetes specialist.

== Early life ==
Tahdooahnippah is a citizen of the Comanche Nation and of Choctaw descent.

He won the honor as a Cadet Greco-Roman All-American, placing 7th in the United States. He also represented Oklahoma as an "Oklahoma All Star" and toured Japan before receiving a full wrestling scholarship to Delaware State University.

== Kickboxer ==
At the age of 23, he became an amateur kickboxer, winning the North Texas light heavyweight title. He was also the runner-up at the 2002 "Sansho-Kickboxing World Championships". He participated in the Original Toughman competition, where he won the light heavyweight championship.

== Professional boxing career ==
He did not have his first professional boxing match until age 25. He eventually teamed with manager Bobby Dobbs. He has worked with world class trainers such as Shadeed Suluki and David Vaughn. He currently trains at the Mad Man Boxing Gym in Elgin, OK.

=== NABC Super Middleweight Championship ===
On September 12, 2008, Tahdooahnippah defeated Jonathan Corn with a seventh round TKO to win the vacant Native American Boxing Council Super Middleweight Championship.

=== Professional boxing record ===
28 Wins (21 knockouts), 0 Losses, 1 Draw
Res.	Record	Opponent	Type	Rd., Time	Date	Location	Notes
Win	28-0-1	(United States) Jimmy Holmes	KO	1st (2:28) of 10	July 16, 2011	Comanche Nation Casino, Lawton, Oklahoma	vacant WBC Continental Americas title
Win	27-0-1	(United States) Thomas Longacre	UD	6 of 6	February 25, 2011	Hard Rock Hotel & Casino, Tulsa, Oklahoma	
Win	26-0-1	(Mexico) Eloy Suarez	UD	6 of 6	January 13, 2011	Remington Park, Oklahoma City, Oklahoma	
Win	25-0-1	(United States) Steve Walker	TKO	2 (0:37) of 6	November 12, 2010	Hard Rock Hotel & Casino, Tulsa, Oklahoma	
Win	24-0-1	(United States) Dezi Ford	TKO	1 (2:59) of 6	July 8, 2010	Remington Park, Oklahoma City, Oklahoma	
Win	23-0-1	(United States) Dave Saunders	UD	6 of 6	April 22, 2010	Crowne Plaza Hotel, Tulsa, Oklahoma	
