= Sanapia =

Comanche medicine woman

- Sanapia
- Born: Mary Poafpybitty; Spring 1895; Fort Sill, Oklahoma Territory
- Died: 23 January 1984 (aged 88–89)
- Citizenship: Comanche Nation
- Occupation: Medicine woman
- Known for: Spiritual healing

Sanapia, born Mary Poafpybitty (ca. 20 May 1895–23 January 1984), was a Comanche medicine woman and spiritual healer. She is believed to be the last of eagle doctors, a Comanche title referring to a person with eagle medicine for healing the sick. She was influenced by traditional Comanche medicine, incorporating elements of Christianity and Peyotism.

== Early life ==
Sanapia was born Mary Poafpybitty in spring 1895 to David Poafpybitty and Chappy Poafpybitty, both Comanche, living near Fort Sill, Oklahoma Territory. Although it has been written that she was born on May 20, 1895, she was uncertain of her actual birthdate so this date was adopted later on. She was sixth of eleven children but the first girl to be born in her family. While she was young, her family struggled to make ends meet and lived in poverty, relying on rations from nearby Fort Sill. She was raised by her maternal grandmother.

== Spiritual development ==
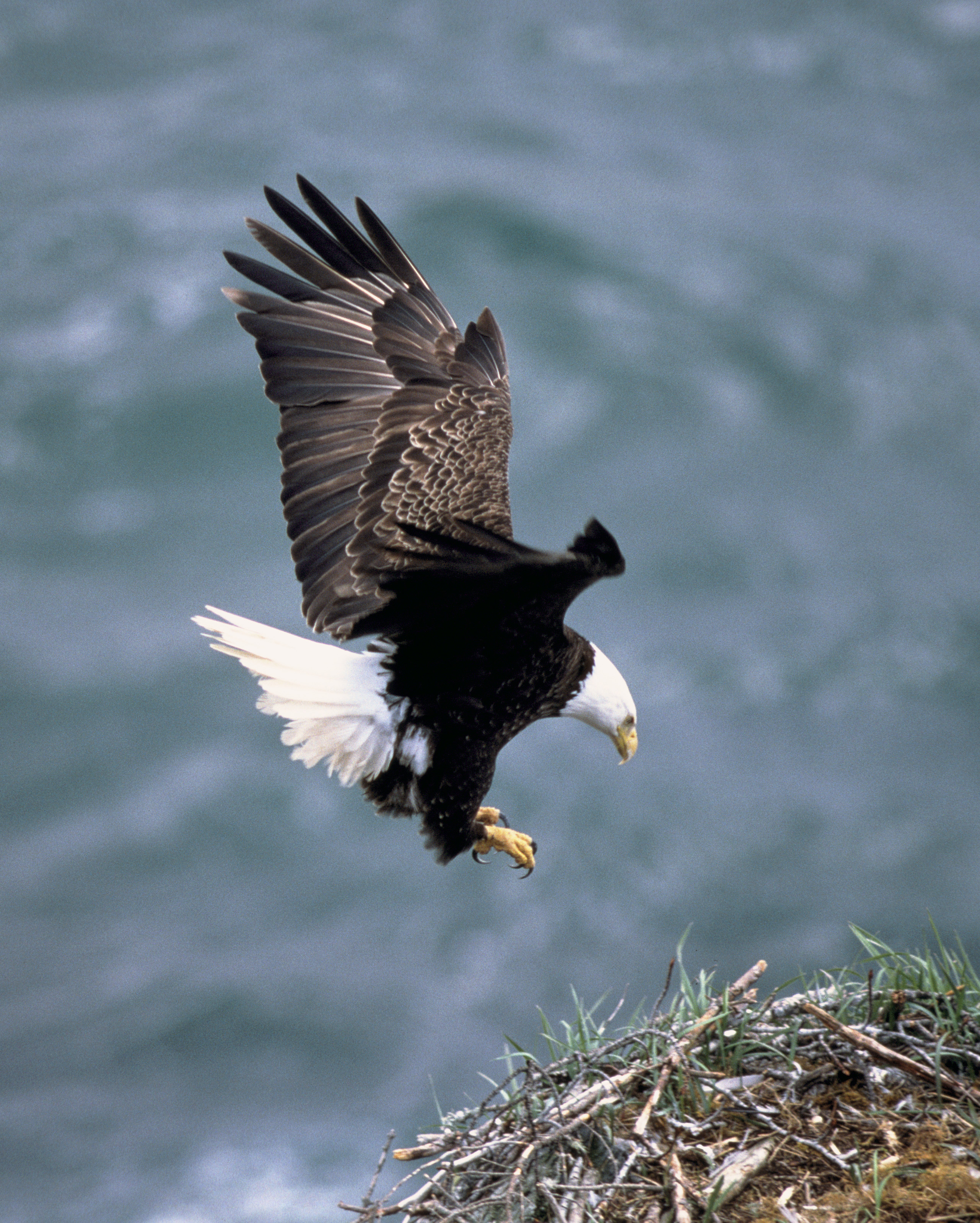
An eagle

Although Sanapia did not begin a career as a medicine woman until her mid-teens, from a very young age she received training from her mother and her maternal uncle, an Arapaho chief, both of whom were eagle doctors. Although her father, David, was a Christian and indifferent to Comanche spiritual practices, he did not interfere with the religious training of his daughter. She attended Cache Creek Mission School in southern Oklahoma from the age of 7 until 14 and during the summer holidays would develop a knowledge of herbal medicines.

Between the ages of 14 and 17 she received full-time training from her mother, uncle, and paternal grandfather to attain the knowledge, ethics, skills and the supernatural powers (paha) to become a medicine woman. The latter, attaining supernatural powers, would be achieved by transferring power through the medium of the hands and mouth, using various methods such as hot coals into her hands, two eagle feathers inserted into her mouth and the egg of an eagle into her stomach. The visionary aspects of the training were achieved through prolonged periods of solitary meditation and spiritual nurturing and intensive reiterating by her mother that evil spirits such as ghosts and demons would harm her, which terrified her. Her uncle named her "Sanapia", which means "Memory Woman".

"I was sure scared then ... almost got up and ran away. I was only a young girl at the time, you know. But, when I took them coals on my hand, inside and outside my hand I felt a chill, maybe. Oh, it was like chills in my hands. That has the meaning that power was in there ... working in my hands. Felt like it would go up my arms even." -Sanapia on having hot coals inserted into hands as part of the training process.

== Marriages and breakdown ==
After her training was completed, a marriage was arranged for her. It was an unhappy one; however, the couple did have one son. She left her first husband and married a second time, a marriage which lasted until her husband's death in the 1930s. From her second marriage, Sanapia had a son and daughter. Her second husband died when Sanapia was 35. She was overcome with grief, and she drank heavily, gambled, and was promiscuous. Then one day, Sanapia healed the sick child of her sister. This event was a spiritual reawakening, and she took it as a sign to denounce her bad ways and became a serious medicine woman.

== Career as a medicine woman ==
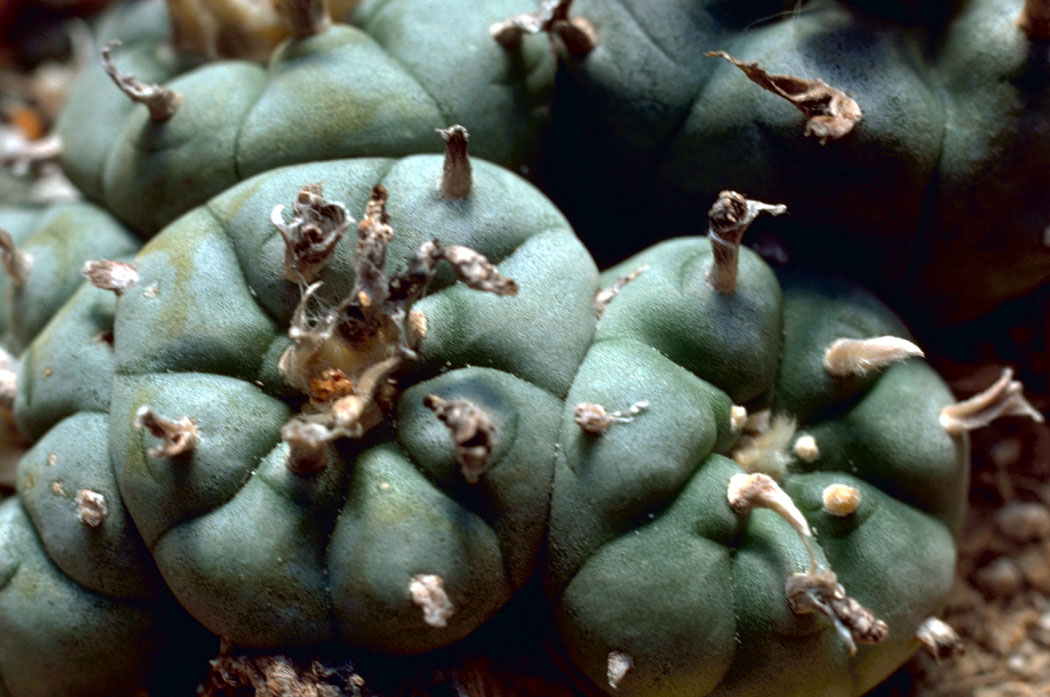
Peyote, a religious sacrament in the Native American Church

Sanapia remarried around 1945, and after menopause, she began her healing practice. She began to have frequent dreams related to the peyote ritual which she believed was a gift from the Christian God to the Native American people. She healed many people using a medical kit of both botanical and non-botanical medicines, such as sneezeweed to treat heart palpitations, low blood pressure and congestion, mescal bean for ear problems, rye grass for the treatment of cataracts, red cedar to ward off ghosts, prickly ash to treat fever; iris for colds, broomweed for dermatological ailments etc. Her most important medicine was peyote. She was only prevalent in using the body parts of dead animals such as beef fat for mouth burns, white otter fur and porcupine quills for children, fossilized bone to treat wounds and infections and even a Bible to pray for power.

During her career she was particularly adept as healing facial paralysis, now known as Bell's palsy which she believed was inflicted upon the victim by an evil ghost. Sanapia believed that the ghost throws a feather into the body of the affected patient and unless it is removed the patient will die. However, she did not believe that the ghost physically placed a feather in a body, but rather placed the essence of it within the individual to inflict pain. She would heal the victim by asking them to bathe in a stream, followed by a prayer to the eagle to help heal her patient, and smudging the patient with cedar smoke. She would then chew on milkweed and place in on the part of the body which was affected by the paralysis and would then suck on the affected part of the patient's face with a cow horn to draw out the sickness. During the healing she would often obtain four or so eagle or crow feathers and fan the patient to ward off evil spirits. If the treatment was ineffective, Sanapia would pray apply peyote tea to the patient's face, head, and hands and if the patient needed her deepest powers of healing she would sing a song until she attracted the spirits to help her.

== Death and legacy ==
Sanapia was buried in the Comanche Indian cemetery near Chandler Creek, Oklahoma. Her activities were documented by David E. Jones in Sanapia, Comanche Medicine Woman, from 1967, with Sanapia's permission. She adopted Jones as her son, otherwise it would be a wrongdoing to pass down information about the traditional healing to an outsider. Sanapia's purpose was for the book to serve as a form of autobiography, to pass the knowledge which she had acquired down to the next generation and to encourage others to follow in her footsteps in being a traditional medicine woman and healer. None of her children, however, were interested enough in spiritual healing to follow in her footsteps.
