= Big Red Meat =

Nokoni Comanche chief (c. 1820/1825 – 1875)

Piarʉ Ekarʉhkapʉ Big Red Meat

Nokoni Comanche leader
- In office 1860–1875

Personal details
- Born: c. 1820/1825
- Died: January 1, 1875 Fort Sill icehouse
- Known for: Leading the Nokoni Comanche from 1860 to 1875 during the last decade of the "Indian wars"

Big Red Meat (Comanche: Piarʉ Ekarʉhkapʉ – big red-meat, big red-food; c. 1820/1825 – January 1, 1875) was a Nokoni Comanche chief.

== Young man ==
In his early life, Big Red Meat was trained under the Nokoni Chief Huupi-pahati (Tall Tree), and his second-in-command, Quenah-evah (Eagle Drink). Quenah-evah later replaced Huupi-pahati, after his death, possibly due to the smallpox and cholera epidemics of 1849. Quenah-evah took the role of principal chief, presumably with Horseback (Tʉhʉyakwahipʉ) as second-ranking chief, and Big Red Meat grew up as a war leader; he was considered the best fighter among the Nokonis.

During the 1850s and 1860s, Big Red Meat gained fame among the other Native American tribes in Texas because of his success in battle against them.

== War leader ==
Big Red Meat became the second chief of the Nokoni after Quena-evah's death or retirement, and Horseback's choice as head chief, possibly in 1866.

When Horseback, as the first-ranking chief, signed the Medicine Lodge Treaty on behalf of the Nokoni on October 21, 1867, he emerged as the leader of the "peaceful" faction of the band. The second-ranking chief, Big Red Meat, led the uncompromising faction, and was joined by Tahka (Arrowpoint), the war chief of Horseback's (aka Kiyou's) band.

In 1868, the Comanche and Kiowa raids increased as Guipago had not signed the Medicine Lodge Treaty. In January, 25 people were killed, 9 more were scalped, and 14 children were kidnapped. In February, seven people were killed, five children were kidnapped, and 50 horses and mules were stolen. Later that same year, Big Red Meat and some of his Nokoni followers (including possibly Tahka), together with Mow-way, who brought his Kotsoteka, and Satanta with his Kiowa braves led several raids through Texas. On October 6, in Montgomery County, one man was killed, three children were kidnapped, and many horses were stolen by a Kotsoteka and Nokoni Comanche party. In Atascosa County, eight men were killed and several hundred horses were stolen by a Comanche and Kiowa party. In addition, the Indian warriors successfully defeated a posse of cowboys and farmers who were attempting to capture them. Peaceful Horseback and belligerent Big Red Meat's Nokonis camped in two villages on the western edge of the Wichita Mountains, not far from Fort Cobb, and Big Red Meat's (and likely Tahka's) Nokonis, together with Mow-way Kotsotekas, rushed to help the southern Cheyennes, assailed by George A. Custer's 7th Cavalry on November 27 at Washita, and took part in the fight sweeping out Maj. Joel Elliot's squadron; when the Canadian River Expedition, six companies of the 3rd Cavalry and two of the 37 Infantry, 12 officers and 446 enlisted men strong, was following the main (South) Canadian River, from Fort Bascom in eastern New Mexico, crossing the Texas Panhandle in late fall 1868, and then, near the Antelope Hills in Colorado, turning south toward the Wichita Mountains and coming near the Nokoni villages. On December 25, 1868, soldiers of the U.S. 3rd Cavalry and 37th Infantry arrived at the Nokoni village, later known as Soldier Spring, while Horseback was away; the U.S. commander, maj. Andrew Wallace Evans, marched on the encampment with his troops and 2 Mountain Howitzers; his blood still boiling after the Washita massacre of November 27h, and his warriors' too, seeing the soldiers coming, war chief Tahka engaged them in battle; the Nokoni were defeated and Tahka died in the fight, the village was burned, and the livestock were killed; Comanche warriors arrived from Big Red Meat's village to fight side-by-side with their kinsmen, and Kiowa, too.

== Attack on Big Red Meat's camp near Anadarko ==
During a council at Fort Cobb, on November 6, 1872, retired Capt. Henry Alvord met some Comanche chiefs (Horseback, Big Red Meat, Mow-way, Tabananika, Puhiwitoya, Hitetetsi, Howea, Quitsquip, Esihabit, and Tokomi), to urge them that "good Indians" should be helped, but bad Indians should be punished (and their rations should be held by the agent); Esihabit, Big Red Meat, Mow-way, and Tabananika retorted harshly the U.S. government first was accustomed not to keep his promises. Big Red Meat was among the Comanche leaders involved in the fight against the buffalo hunters at Adobe Walls. After the Adobe Walls battle on June 27–28, 1874, several Yamparika (Isa-nanica, Hitetetsi or Tuwikaa-tiesuat, Piyi-o-toho, and, camping nearby, Tabananika and Isa-rosa), Kotsoteka (Mow-way, also camping nearby), Nokoni (Big Red Meat) and Quahadi (Kobay-oburra, head chief after Parua-ocoom's death) bands went to the Fort Sill agency for the census and the distribution of annuities, but only Isa-nanica was allowed to stay in the Fort Sill reserve. The other chiefs had to lead their people to the Wichita agency at Anadarko. Following the killings carried out by the Kiowa, Capt. Gaines Lawson and his company (25th Infantry) were sent to garrison Anadarko. They were reinforced by col. John W. "Black Jack" Davidson with four companies of 10th Cavalry from Fort Sill. On August 22, near Anadarko, a cavalry detachment was sent to Big Red Meat's village (60 tents) to take their guns and bow-and-arrows, and deport the Nokoni to Fort Sill as prisoners. The Kiowa laughed at the misfortune of the Comanche, and the Nokoni warriors attacked the troop. The soldiers fired at both groups of natives as they fought. During the night, Davidson ordered Comanche tents to be burned. The fight continued the following day, August 23, with four soldiers and 14 native warriors wounded (one more was killed). After this engagement, the Nokoni and Kiowa retreated, burning the prairie and murdering some settlers near Anadarko and along the Beaver Creek. After this, Tosawi and Asa-havey led their Penateka to Fort Sill, while Horseback went with his Nokoni band to the Wichita agency. The Yamparika and Nokoni joined the Quahadi and Kotsoteka, camping at Chinaberry Trees, Palo Duro Canyon.

== His final battle ==
While Horseback managed to prevent his Nokoni warriors' involvement in the Red River War in 1873–1874, Big Red Meat joined the hostile Comanche and Kiowa faction, uniting himself and his Nokoni warriors with Quanah Parker, Parua-o-coom (Bull Bear), Kobay-oburra (Wild Horse), Kobay-otoho (Black Horse), Isatai, and their Quahadi Comanche; to Mow-way (He pushing-aside or He pushing-in-the-middle, but usually called Shaking Hand) and his Kotsoteka; to Tabananika (Sound-of-the-Sunrise), Isa-rosa (White Wolf) and Hitetetsi (or Tuwikaa-tiesuat Little Crow), and their Yamparika. They were soon joined by some Kiowa led by Guipago, Satanta, Zepko-ete (Big Bow), Tsen-tainte (White Horse), and Mamanti (He Walking-above).

== Imprisonment and death ==
Big Red Meat was involved in the campaign led by Colonel Ranald Mackenzie with his 4th Cavalry Regiment (United States) against Quanah Parker and his followers through late 1874 and into 1875 in the Staked Plains. He was also in the battle of Palo Duro Canyon, where the Army destroyed five Native American villages on September 28, 1874. Mackenzie's final blow to the Native Americans' will was the killing of 1,000 of their horses in Tule Canyon. On November 5, 1874, Mackenzie's forces won a minor engagement, his last, with the Comanches. Big Red Meat surrendered on October 23, after a fight against Maj. Schofield's 10th Cavalry companies near Elk Creek, and was jailed at Fort Sill. In March 1875, Mackenzie assumed command at Fort Sill and control over the Comanche-Kiowa and Cheyenne-Arapaho reservations. After the Palo Duro campaign (1874) and the surrender of the last hostile Comanche groups coming back from the Staked Plains, the nine remaining Comanche men were sent to Fort Marion, Florida. Big Red Meat died in captivity in the icehouse of Fort Sill on January 1, 1875.
