= Horseback (Comanche) =

Nokoni Comanche chief (c.1805-1888)

Horseback Tʉhʉya Kwahipʉ
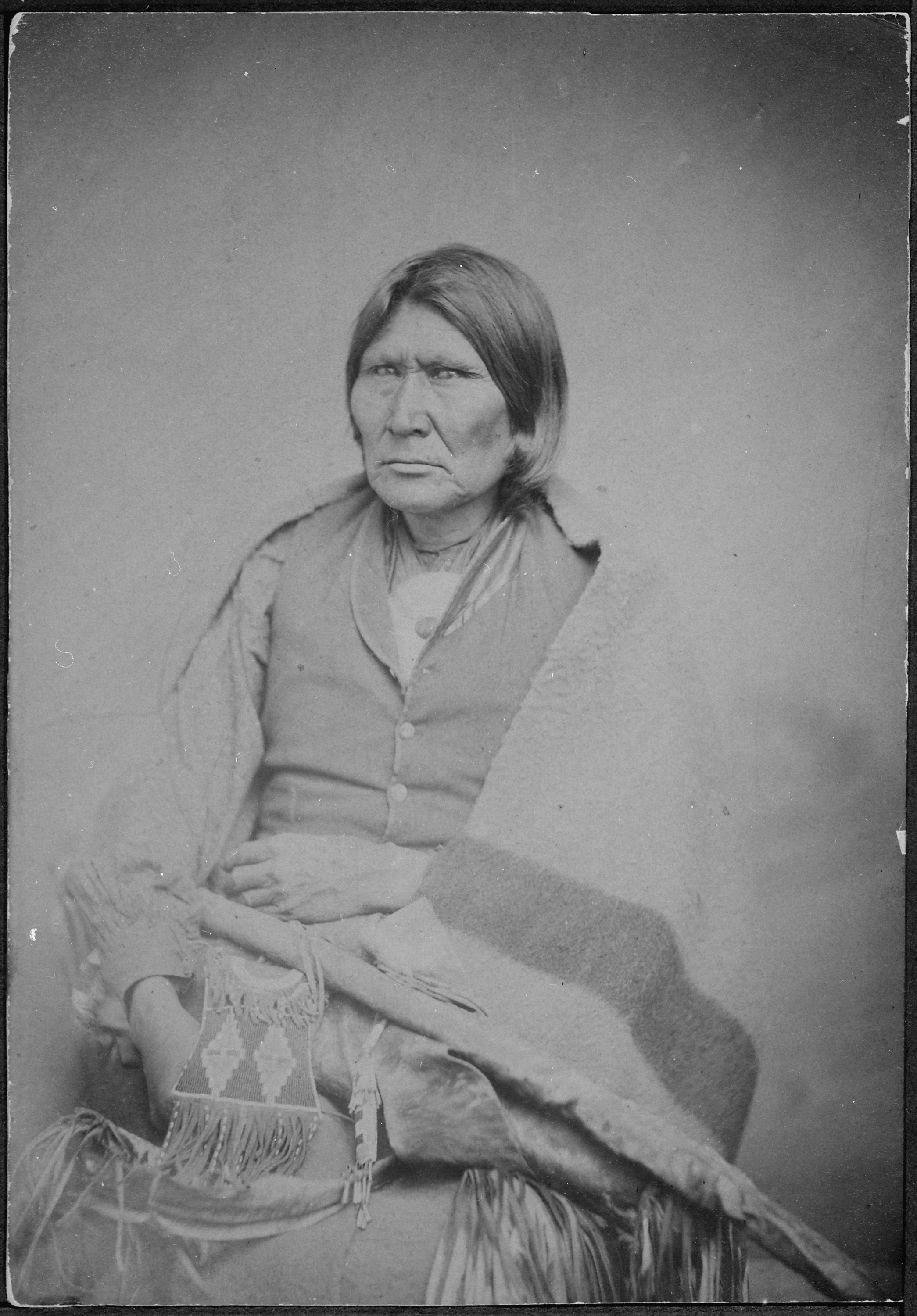

Nokoni Comanche leader
- In office 1840–1870

Personal details
- Born: c. 1805/1810
- Died: 1888 Anadarko Agency
- Known for: 1850–1870 as a peaceful chief, led the Nokoni Comanche tribe during the last decade of the "Indian wars"

Horseback (Comanche: Tʉhʉya Kwahipʉ (Note: Anglicized Tirhaya-quehip or Fer-ha-yer-quoip, likely Ter-ha-yer-quoip, in older works.) or Kiyou horse back) (1805/1810-1888) was a Nokoni Comanche chief.

== Young man: warrior and war chief ==
Tʉhʉya Kwahipʉ was born at some moment around the years 1805 and 1810, in what was then the viceroyalty of New Spain. When he came to the world, the bands that made up the Comanchería were a semi-autonomous region (akin to the Roman foederati) of the Spanish Empire as a result of the peace of Pecos, secured by famed governor Juan Bautista de Anza in 1786 and which set the terms for the integration of the Comanche into the late imperial network. This situation fell apart as a result of the independence of Mexico in 1821, when the bankrupt nation stopped paying tributes to the Lords of the plains, restarting a period of war between the colonial settlers and the Comanche.

In his prime, he made his career under the elder Huupi-pahati (Tall Tree), head chief of the Nokoni band, and Quenah-evah (Eagle Drink), second chief and later successor to Huupi-pahati himself possibly after the smallpox and cholera epidemics occurred in 1849; during the 1840s and 1850s he gained a good fame as a war leader against the Comanche's Indian enemies and a raider through Texas.

== Diplomat and peaceful leader ==
In 1861, along with the Yamparika head chief Ten Bears and the Penateka chiefs Tosahwi (White Knife) and Asa-havey a.k.a. Esihabit (Milky Way), went to Fort Cobb where they met General Albert Pike (C.S.A.), and the Comanche chiefs (including Quena-evah) signed for an allegiance with the Confederate States of America. He became head chief of the Nokoni after Quena-evah's death or retirement, possibly in 1866. Not a long time after Peta Nocona (Lone Wanderer)'s death about 1864, and having become Parua-ocoom (Bull Bear) the new first chief of the Kwahadi Comanche, Kobe (Wild Horse) second Chief of Kwahadi took with him the two adolescent sons of the dead Kwahadi chief and grandsons of Iron Jacket, Quanah Parker and Pecos, to complete their training as young men and warriors; the two youngsters settled with the Nokonis, their foster grandfather Tabby-nocca (Lean Elk)'s kinsmen, under the supervision of Horseback.

Horseback was involved, like Esihabit and some other chiefs, in the policy of ransoming white prisoners from the other Comanche bands, and in January 1867 he or Esihabit (according to two different versions) were the makers of young Theodore "Dot" Babb (kidnapped in September 1865 or 1866) ransoming, bypassing the U.S. authorities.

Horseback signed for the Nokoni the Medicine Lodge Treaty (Oct. 21 1867), emerging as the leader of the "peaceful" faction of the band, but the second-ranking chief, Big Red Meat, took the leadership of the uncompromising faction, and on the same "hostile" line was Tahka (Arrowpoint), war chief of Tʉhʉyakwahipʉ's own party. According to the treaty, signed by ten Comanche chiefs (Tʉhʉyakwahipʉ a.k.a. Kiyou, for the Nokonis; Parua-wasamen, his sons Esananaka and Hitetetsi, Howea, Tipenavon, Puhiwitoya, Saddyo for the Yamparikas; Tosawi and Ceachinika for the Penatekas) obliged the signing Comanches to go and settle into a reserve under the surveillance of Fort Cobb's garrison.

On December 12, 1868, while Tʉhʉyakwahipʉ was not in his village in the spot after known as Soldier Spring, a battle occurred there against 3rd Cavalry and 37th Infantry U.S. troops; the soldiers came on the village and the war chief Tahka reacted against the "long knives" leading the Nokoni warriors to fight; the Nokoni were defeated, Tahka being killed in the battle, and the village was burnt and stocks destroyed.

== Attack on Horseback's village ==
On December 19, 1868 a large Comanche and Kiowa band faced a company of the 10th Cavalry Regiment (Maj. Meredith H. Kidd) on the way from Fort Arbuckle to Fort Cobb. On December 25, six companies of the 3rd Cavalry and one company of 37 Infantry, with 12 officers and 446 troopers (Canadian River Expedition, led by Maj. Andrew W. Evans), with a battery of mountain howitzers, on the way from Fort Bascom crossing the Texas Panhandle to the Antelope Hills, and then turning south toward the Wichita Mountains, on December 12 came on the Nokoni village (about 60 tipis) of Horseback and Tahka, where Yamparika chief Howea was as a visitor; Horseback, the peaceful civil chief, was not in the camp, and Tahka’s blood was still boiling after the Washita massacre perpetrated by lt. col. George A. Custer and his 7th Cavalry less than one month before. Seeing the soldiers arriving, and being taunted by the Kiowa allies, Tahka, the war chief, led the Comanche warriors in a charge. He was killed and the village and the stocks were destroyed. Kiowa warriors led by Manyi-ten came to take part in the fight; Big Red Meat's Nokonis and Mow-way's Kotsotekas ran to the fight; only one soldier was killed. Within December 1868, exhausted after lack of food and freezing weather, the Nokoni went to Fort Cobb and there surrendered.

== The last fight for freedom ==
Like Tosahwi, Horseback managed to keep out the Nokoni preventing their involvement in the Red River War in 1873–1874, but only a minor faction of Nokoni band followed him along the "peace road", and he lost most of his former followers, while Big Red Meat joined the hostile Comanche and Kiowa faction, uniting himself and his Nokoni warriors to Quanah Parker, Parra-ocoom, Kobay-oburra (Wild Horse), Kobay-otoho (Black Horse), Isatai'i, and their Quahadi Comanche, to Mow-way and his Kotsoteka, to Tabananika (Sound-of-the-Sunrise), Isa-rosa (White Wolf) and Hitetetsi aka Tuwikaa-tiesuat (Little Crow), son to Ten Bears, and their Yamparika, and to the Kiowa led by Guipago, Satanta, Zepko-ete (Big Bow), Tsen-tainte (White Horse) and Mamanti (Walking-above).

== The sunset years ==
After the Palo Duro campaign (1874) and the surrendering of the last hostile Comanche groups coming back from the Staked Plains, Horseback was appointed by the Army as head chief of all the Comanches, and was ordered to pick out the "worst" Comanche, to send them to Fort Marion, Florida; the same happened to Kicking Bird for the Kiowas, and the Kiowa chief pointed out 27 chiefs and warriors, but Horseback was able to sacrifice only nine men (one Black Horse - Tu-ukumah -, but probably not Kobay-otoho third chief of the Quahadi band, and eight "outlawed" warriors), preventing the deportation of all the defeated chiefs (but, unfortunately, not the life of Parua-ocoom, dead on June 27–28, 1874, during the Adobe Walls fighting, and that of Big Red Meat, dead in the icehouse – temporarily used as a jail – of Fort Sill on January 1, 1875. Together with Quanah and some of the old chiefs, Horseback was a constant point of reference for the Comanche people in the reservation until his death in 1888.

== Sources ==
- Webb, Walter Prescott The Texas Rangers: a Century of Frontier Defense, University of Texas Press, Austin, 1983
- Wallace, Ernest & Hoebel, E. Adamson. The Comanche: Lords of the Southern Plains, University of Oklahoma Press, Norman, 1952
- Dickson Schilz, Jodye Lynn and Schilz Thomas F.. Buffalo Hump and the Penateka Comanches, Texas Western Press, El Paso, 1989
- Rollings, Willard. Indians of North America: The Comanche, Chelsea House Publishers, New York, 1989.
- Richardson, Rupert N. The Comanche Barrier to South Plains Settlement: A Century and a Half of Savage Resistance to the Advancing White Frontier, Arthur H. Clark Company, Glendale, CA, 1933.
- Nye, Wilbur Sturtevant. Carbine and Lance: The Story of Old Fort Sill, University of Oklahoma Press, Norman, 1983
- Leckie, William H.. The Buffalo Soldiers: A Narrative of the Negro Cavalry in the West, University of Oklahoma Press, Norman, 1967
- Kavanagh, William T.. The Comanches, a History 1706-1875, University of Nebraska Press, Lincoln, 1996
- Haley, James L.. The Buffalo War: the History of the Red River Indians Uprising of 1874, University of Oklahoma Press, Norman, 1976
- Hagan, William T.. Quanah Parker, Comanche Chief, Norman: University of Oklahoma Press, 1976
- Fowler, Arlen L.. The Black Infantry in the West, 1869-1891, University of Oklahoma Press, Norman, 1996
- Fehrenbach, Theodore Reed. The Comanches: The Destruction of a People. New York: Knopf, 1974, ISBN 0-394-48856-3. Later (2003) reprinted as The Comanches: The History of a People
- Chalafant, William J.. Without Quarter: the Wichita Expedition and the fight on Crooked Creek, Norman: University of Oklahoma Press, 1991
- Brown, Dee. Bury My Heart at Wounded Knee: An Indian History of the American West, Holt, Rinehart & Winston, New York, 1970
