= William Stinson Soule =

American photographer (1836–1908)

William "Will" Stinson Soule
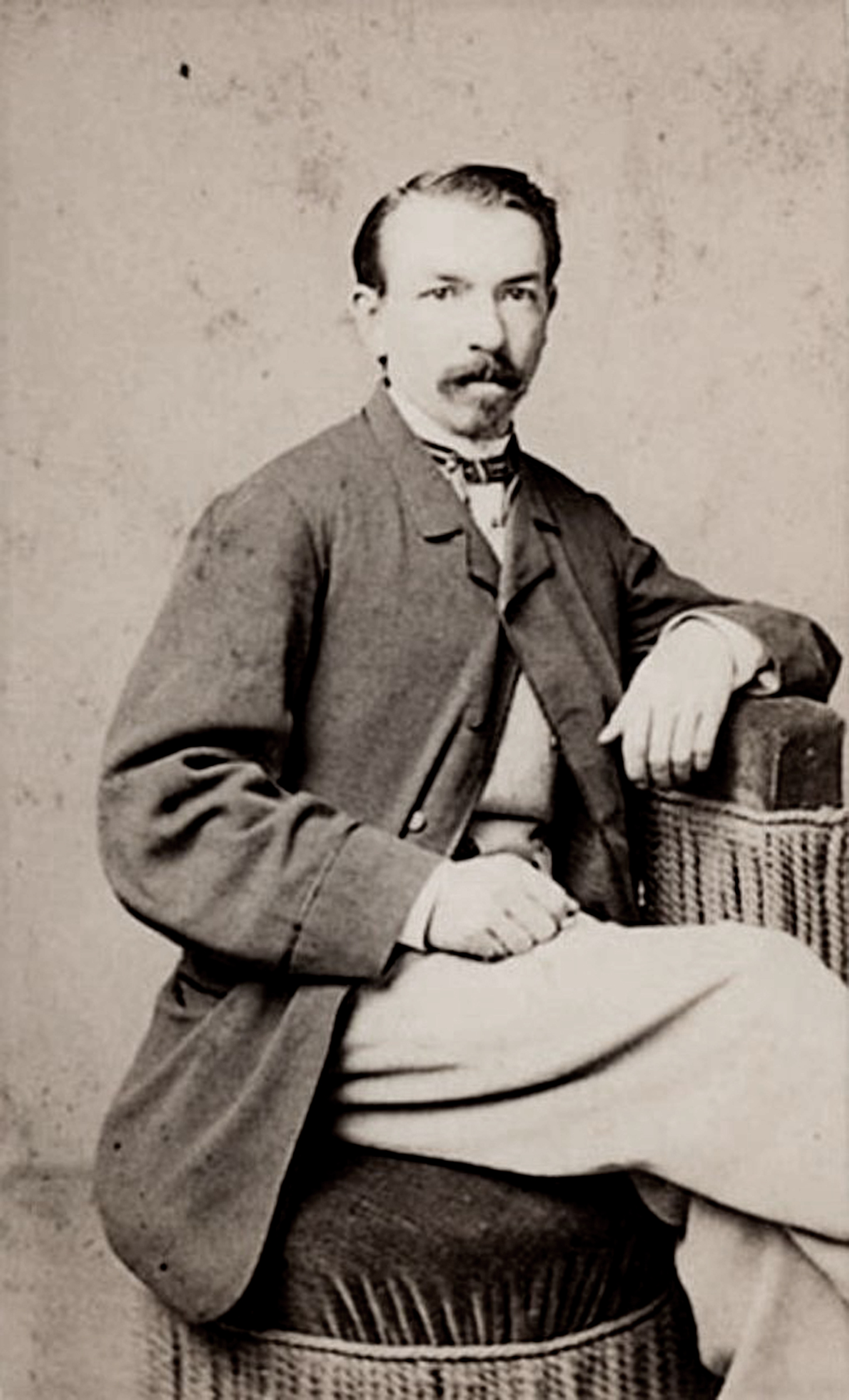
- Soule c. 1870s
- Born: 28 August 1836; Turner, Maine, U.S.
- Died: 12 August 1908 (aged 71); Boston, Massachusetts, U.S.
- Occupation: Photographer
- Spouse: Ella Augusta Blackman (1853–1909)
- Children: Lucia Augusta Soule (1877–1966), Mary Eliza Soule (1882–1911)
- Writing career
- Genres: Native Americans, Cheyenne, Comanche, Kiowa, Wichita, early reservation period

William Stinson Soule (28 August 1836 – 12 August 1908) was a 19th-century photographer of the American West.

== Early years ==
William "Will" Stinson Soule was born on August 26, 1836, on a farm near the town of Turner, Maine, the son of John Soule and of Mary, née True. Little is known about his early years. On the outbreak of the American Civil War Soule enlisted with the 13th Regiment Massachusetts Volunteer Infantry serving the Union Army. He was wounded at the Battle of Antietam on September 17, 1862, and served out the remainder of the war with the Veteran Reserve Corps.

== Career ==
In 1865 Soule opened a photography studio and gallery in Chambersburg, Pennsylvania. When his business was destroyed in a fire in early 1867 he moved west to Fort Dodge (United States Army Post) in Kansas where he found work as a clerk in the sutler's store and the following year moved on to Fort Supply in Indian Territory. In 1869 Soule became the post photographer at Fort Sill where he would remain for six years. Will Soule documented the construction of the fort, but is primarily known for his high quality portraits and photographs of Native American subjects.

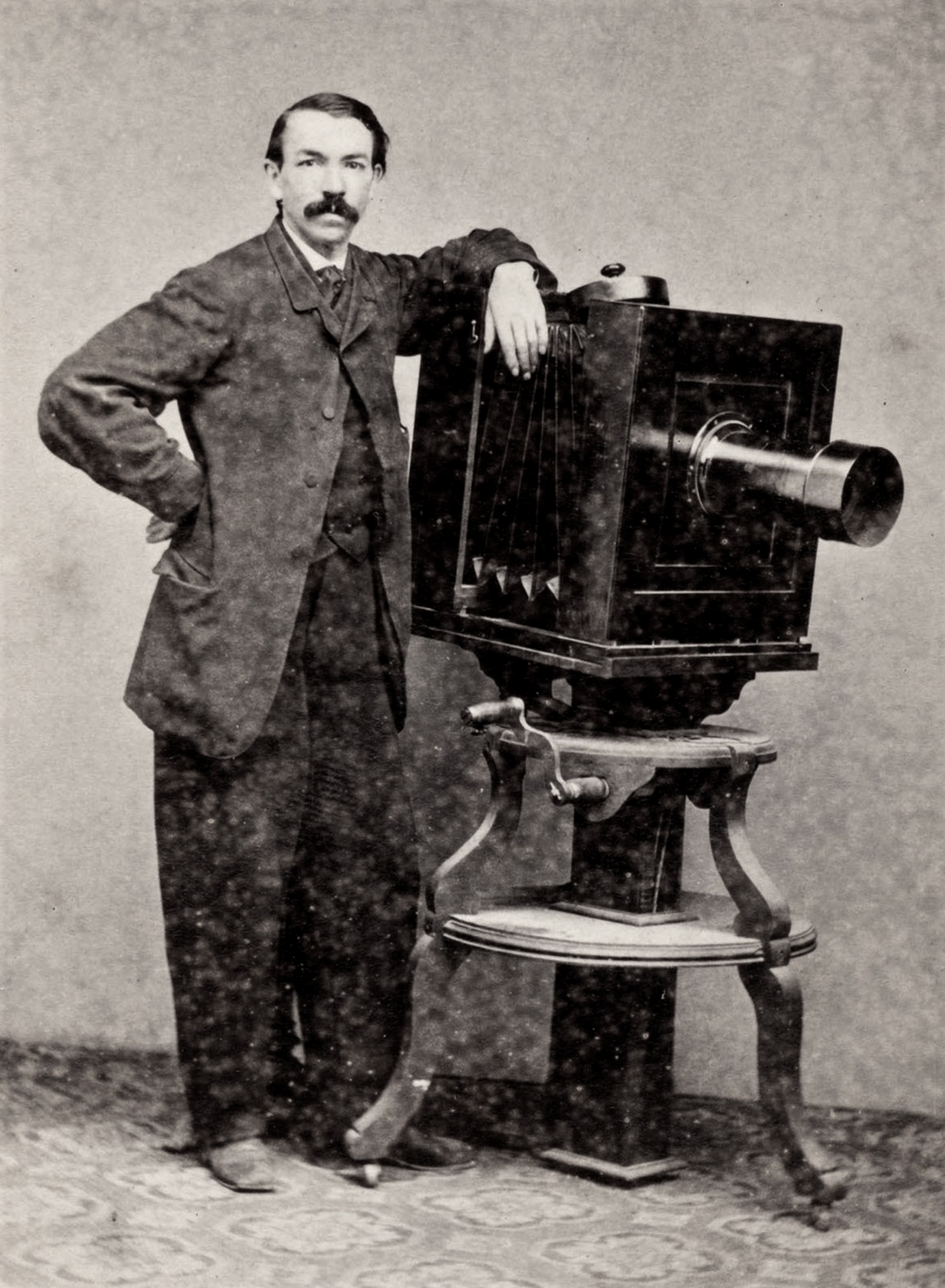
William Stinson Soule, photographer

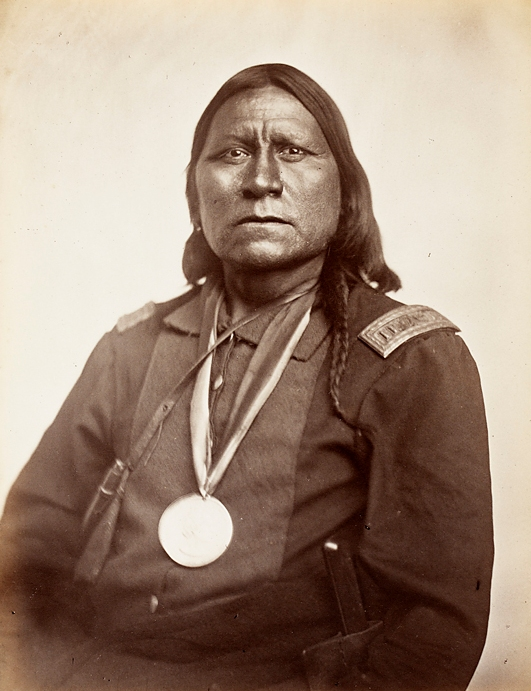
Satanta (SPC BAE 3912-B Vol 1 01158200)

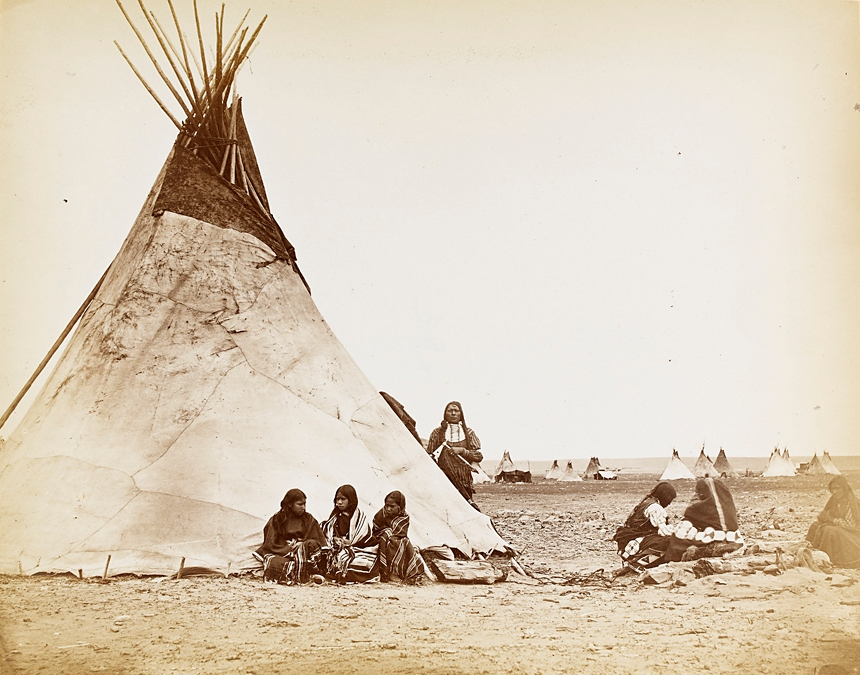
Arapaho camp

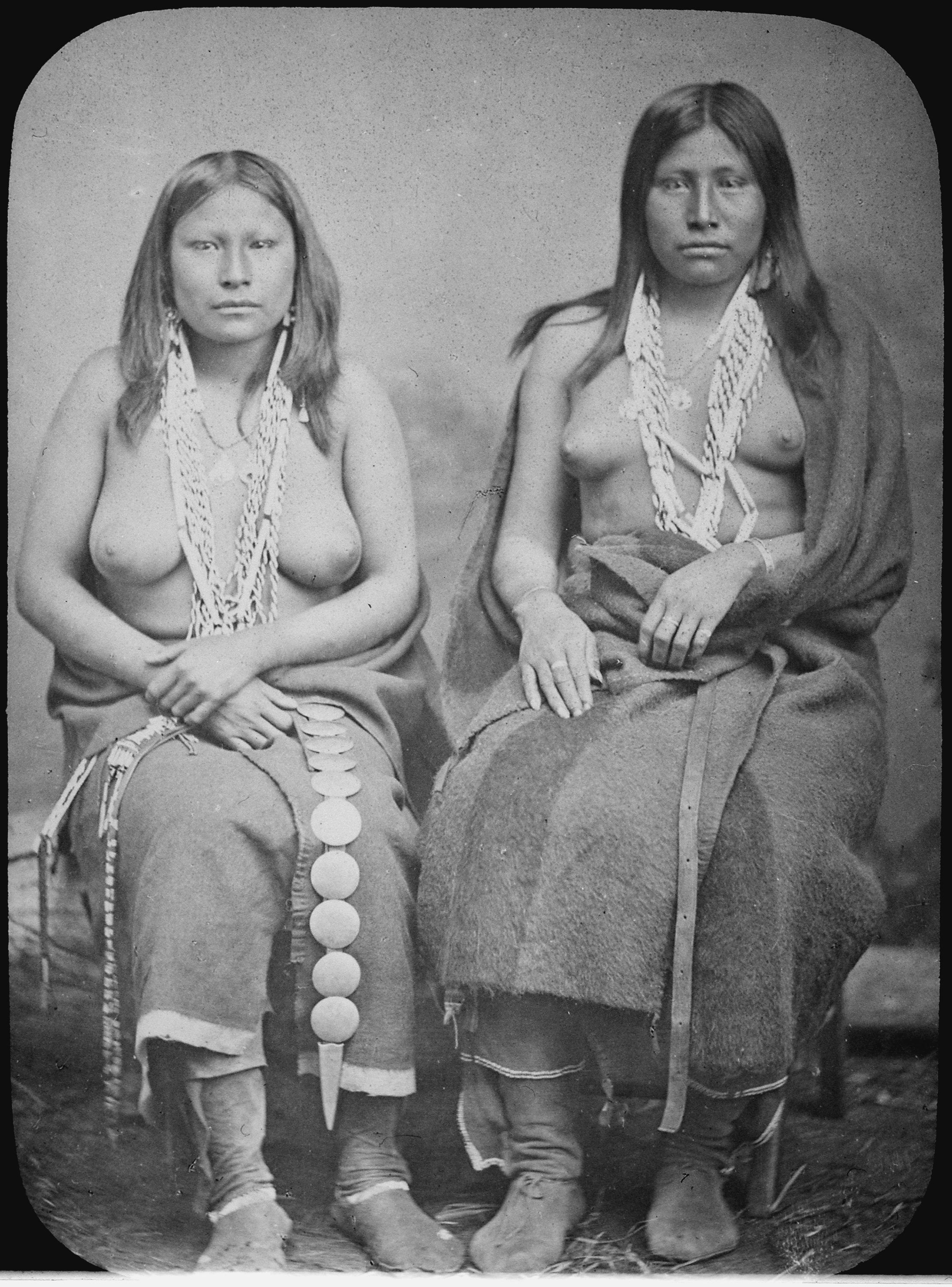
Two Wichita girls in summer dress, 1870 - NARA - 520081

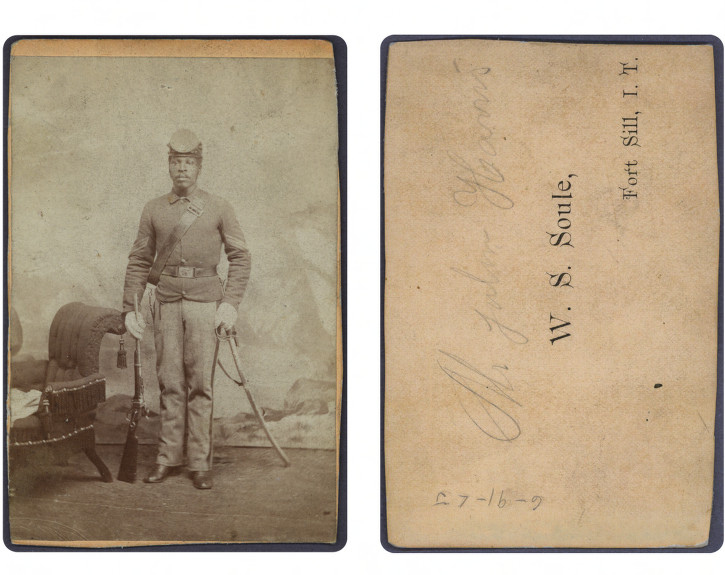
Sergeant John Harris, 10th United States Cavalry Regiment

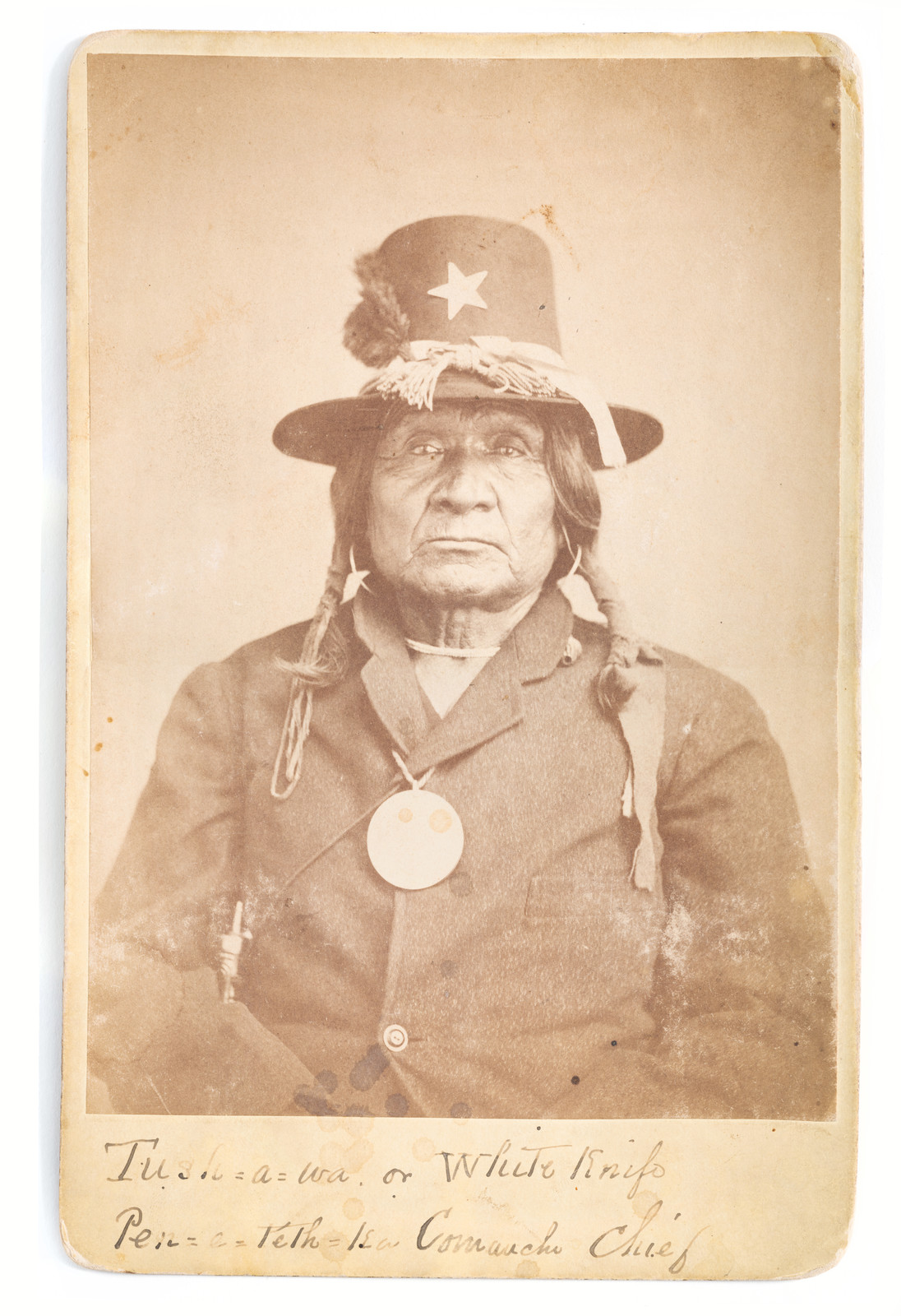
Chief Tosahwi

== Later years ==
Will Soule left Fort Sill in 1875 returning to the east. That year he was married to Ella Augusta Blackman, resided for a time in Philadelphia, then moved to Vermont and finally in 1882 to Boston where he took over the business of his older brother, John P. Soule, The Soule Art Company while the latter was moving to Seattle. Soule remained in business until his retirement in 1900. Will Soule died in Boston on August 12, 1908.
