= John P. Soule =

American photographer

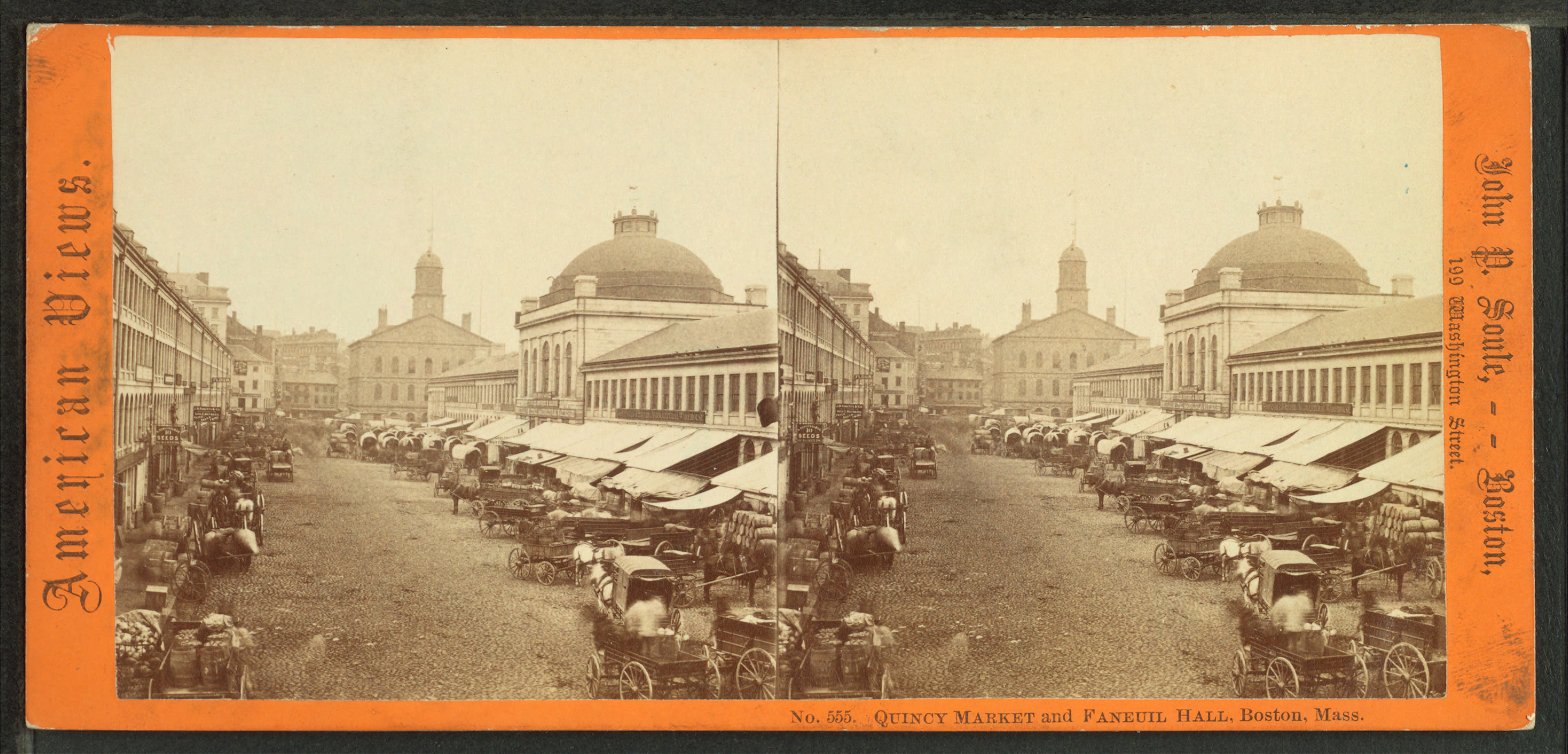
Quincy Market and Faneuil Hall, Boston, by Soule, ca.1860s-1880s

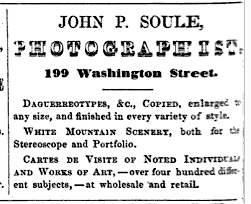
Boston Directory, 1862

John Payson Soule (1828–1904) was a photographer and publisher in Boston, Massachusetts, and Seattle, Washington.

== Biography ==
He was born in Phillips, Maine on October 19, 1828. His younger brother, William Stinson Soule, also became a photographer.

J.P. Soule maintained photographic studios on Washington Street in Boston, ca.1861-1882. As a photographer, his subjects in Boston included buildings, the 1869 National Peace Jubilee, the great fire of 1872, and carte-de-visite portraits. He also photographed mountains in New Hampshire, and the 1866 fire in Portland, Maine. He exhibited works in the Charitable Mechanic's exhibitions of 1850, and 1874 (bronze medal).

In addition to taking photographs, Soule published works by Martin M. Hazeltine and others. Crediting of photographer's original works followed rather murky standards. For instance, photographs "by John P. Soule" of natural scenery in California appeared in Samuel Kneeland's Wonders of Yosemite Valley, and of California (1871). However, "the photographs ... credited to John P. Soule on the title page ... have recently been re-attributed to the photographer Martin Mason Hazeltine. Soule, a publisher of stereoviews, purchased many of Hazeltine's California negatives, copyrighted them in 1870, and began selling them in Boston."

Soule joined the Ancient and Honorable Artillery Company of Massachusetts in 1865, and belonged to the Freemasons.

After leaving Boston around 1882, he traveled west again. "In 1888, John Soule moved to Seattle, where he continued to work as a photographer. Soule photographed the aftermath of the Seattle Fire of 1889 and the rebuilding thereafter. He continued to live in Seattle and occasionally taking photographs of the growing city until his death in 1904."

== Images ==
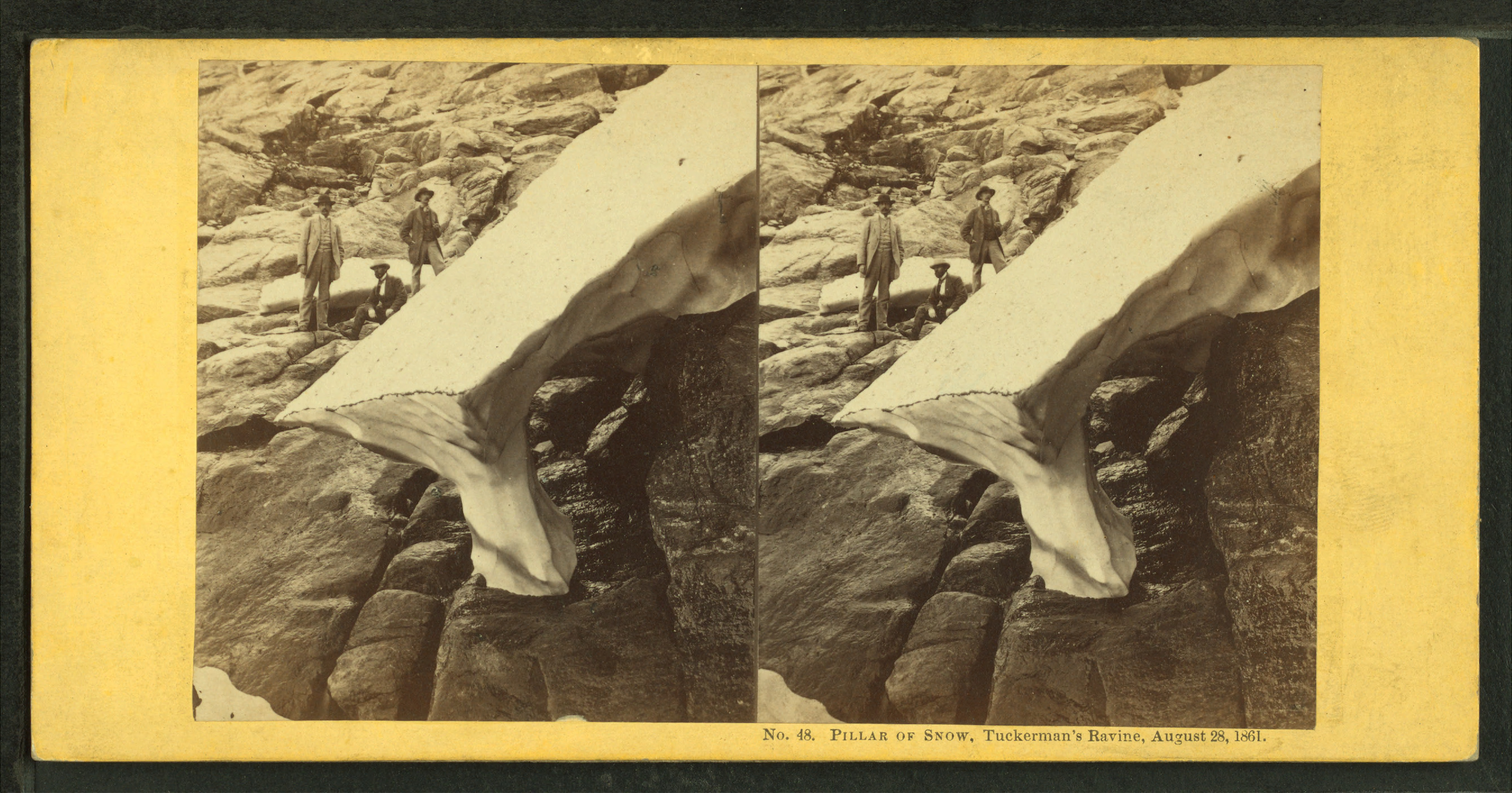
Tuckerman's Ravine, New Hampshire, 1861

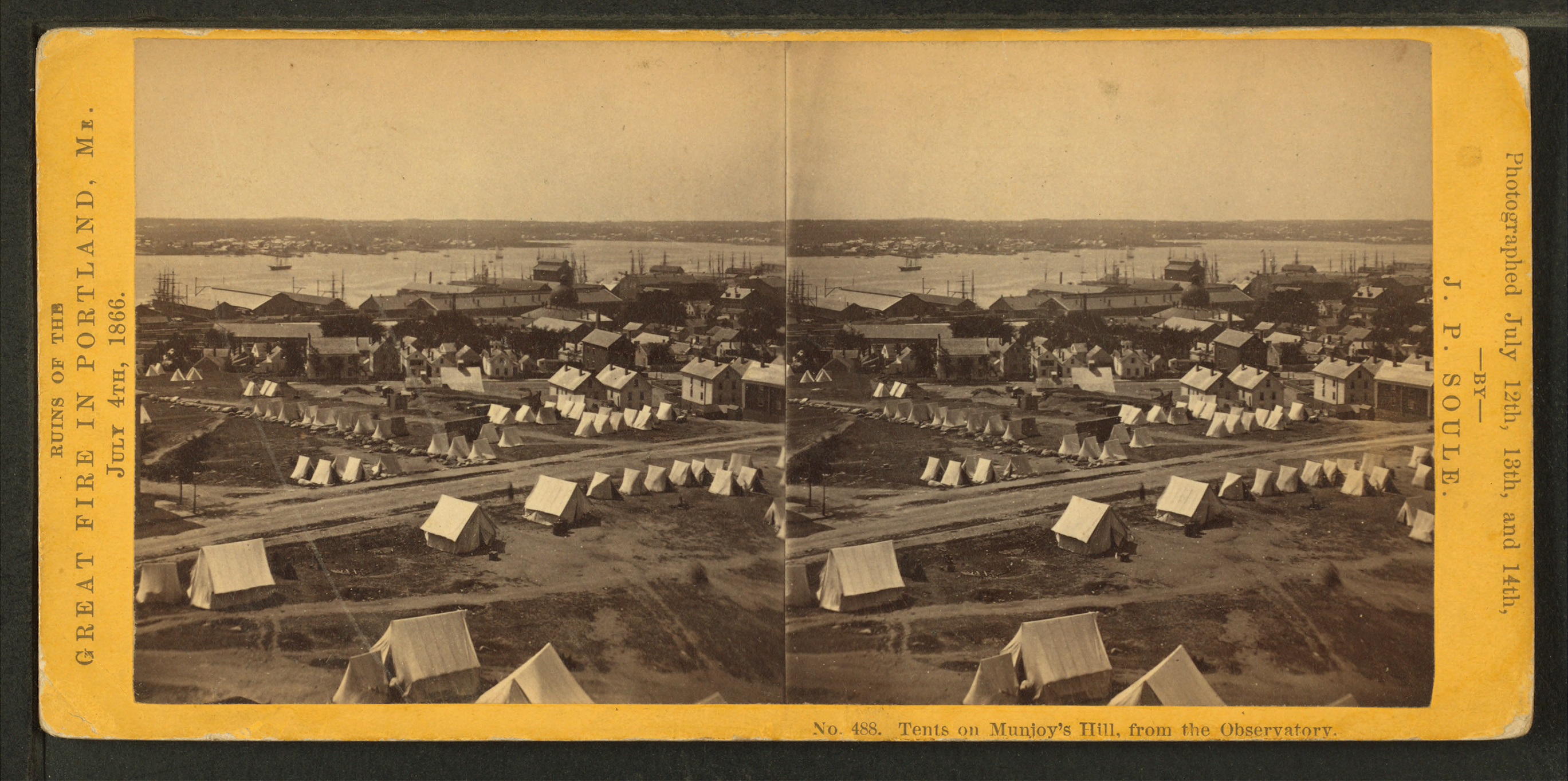
Ruins of the great fire in Portland, Maine, 1866

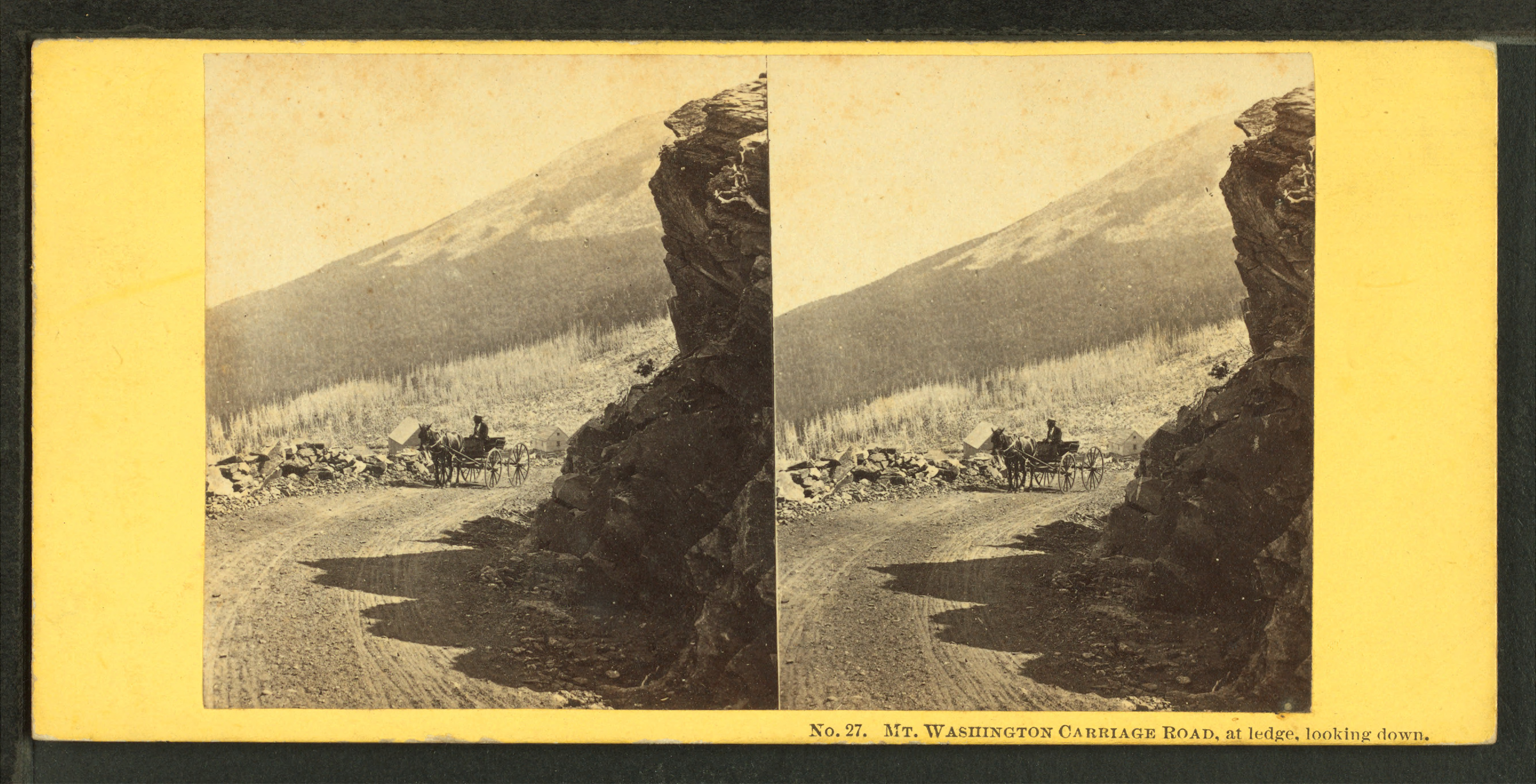
Mt. Washington, New Hampshire, ca.1850s-1870s

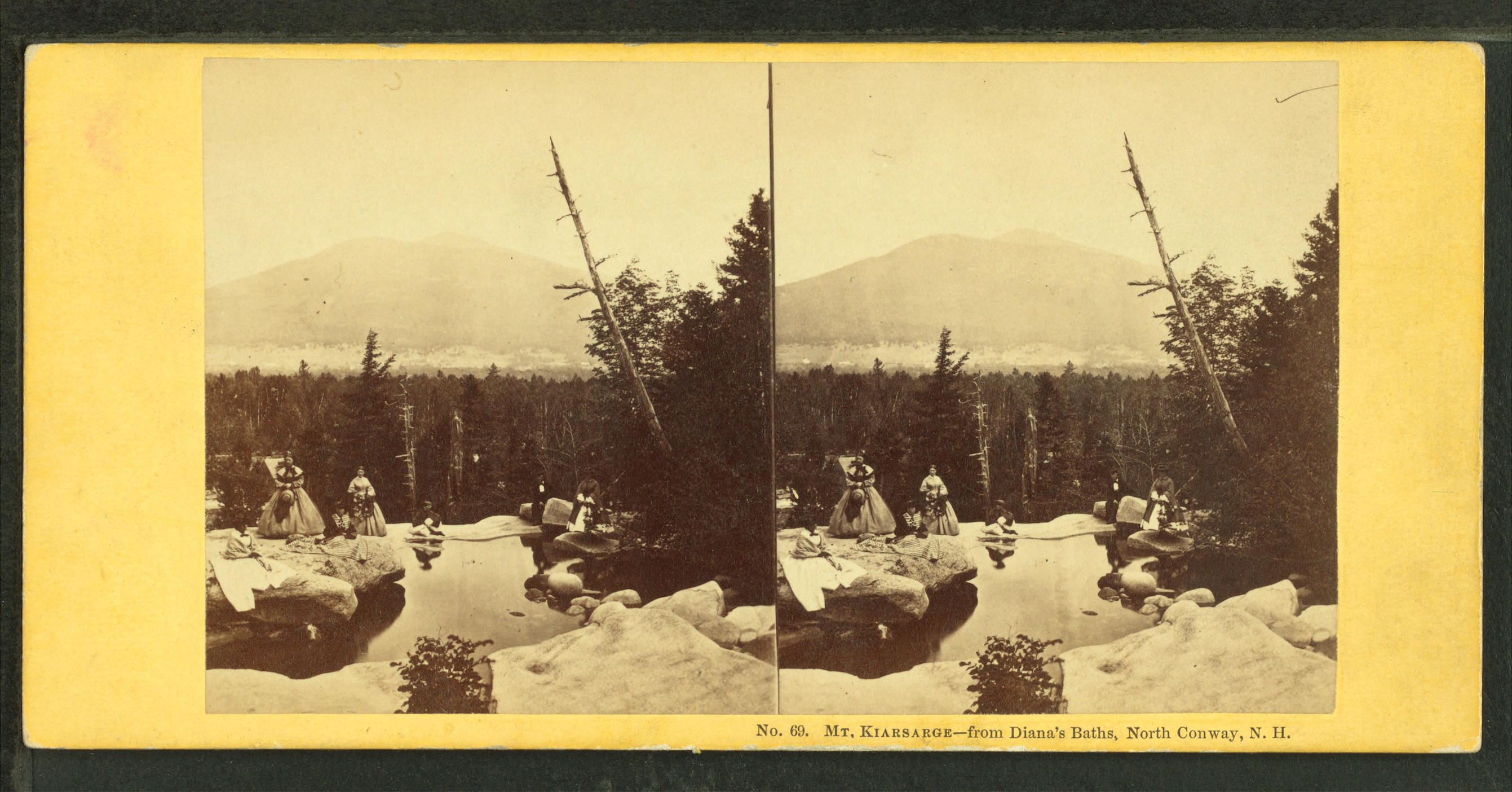
North Conway, New Hampshire, ca.1850s-1870s

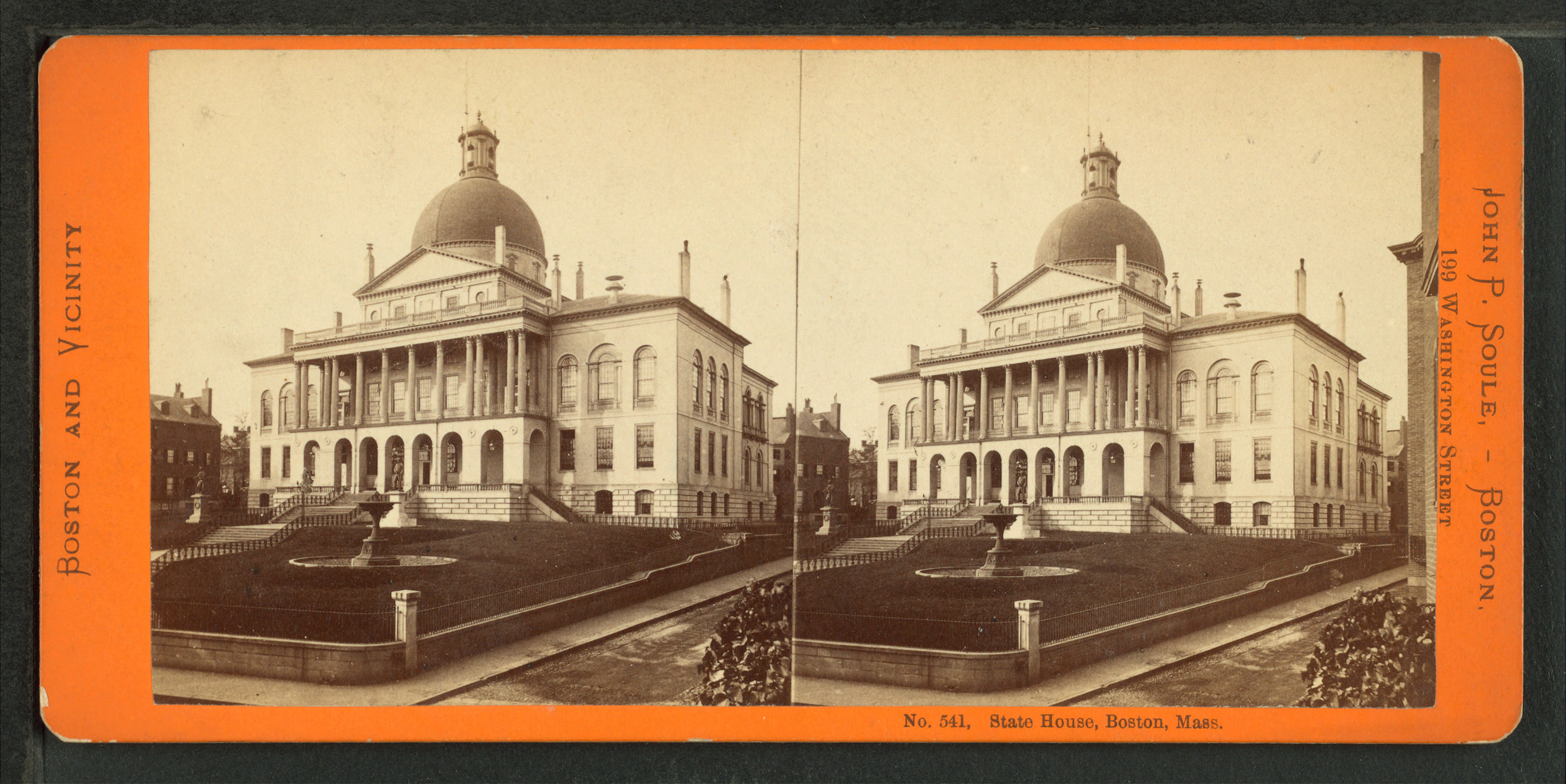
Massachusetts State House, Boston

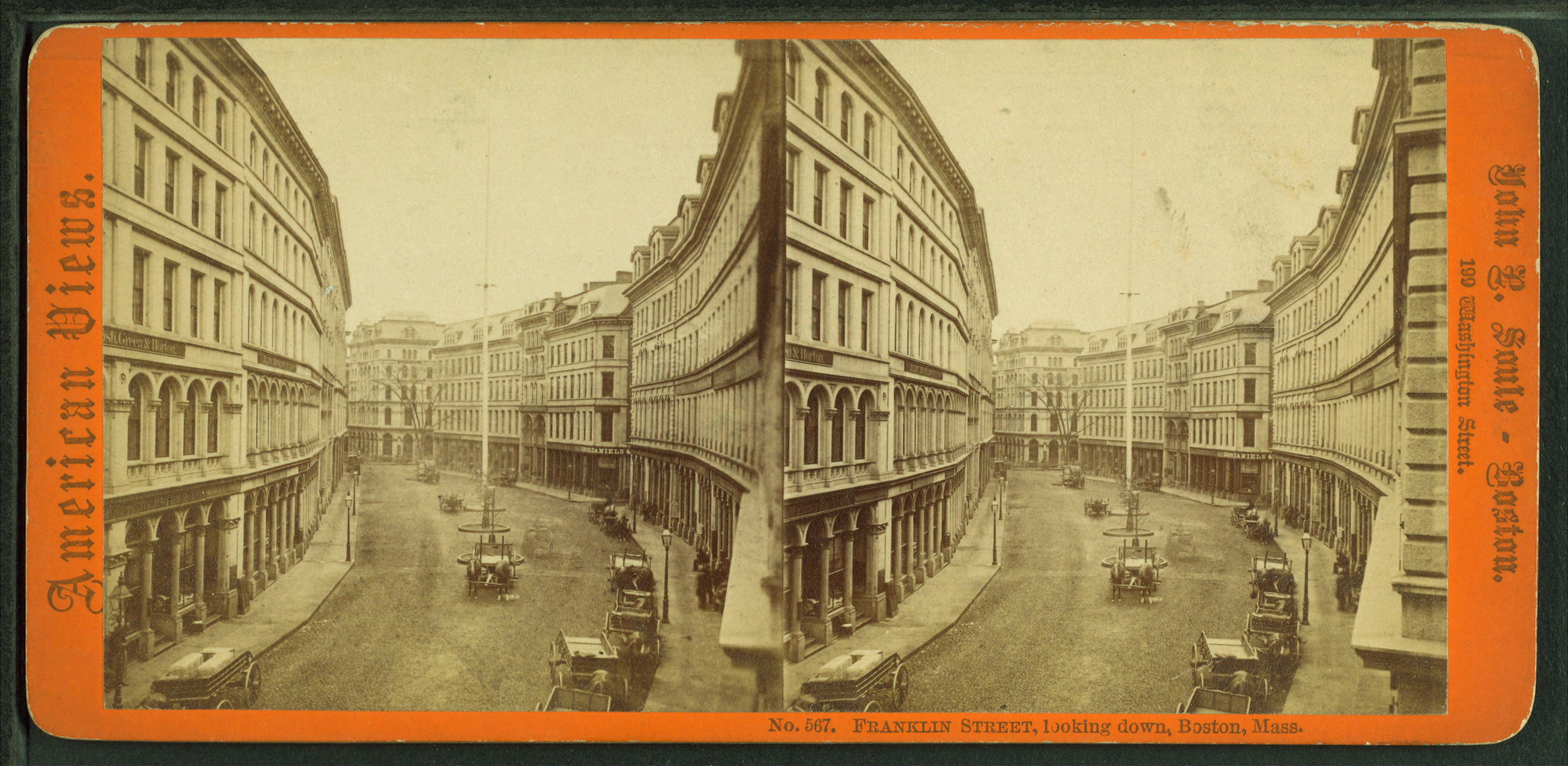
Franklin Street, Boston

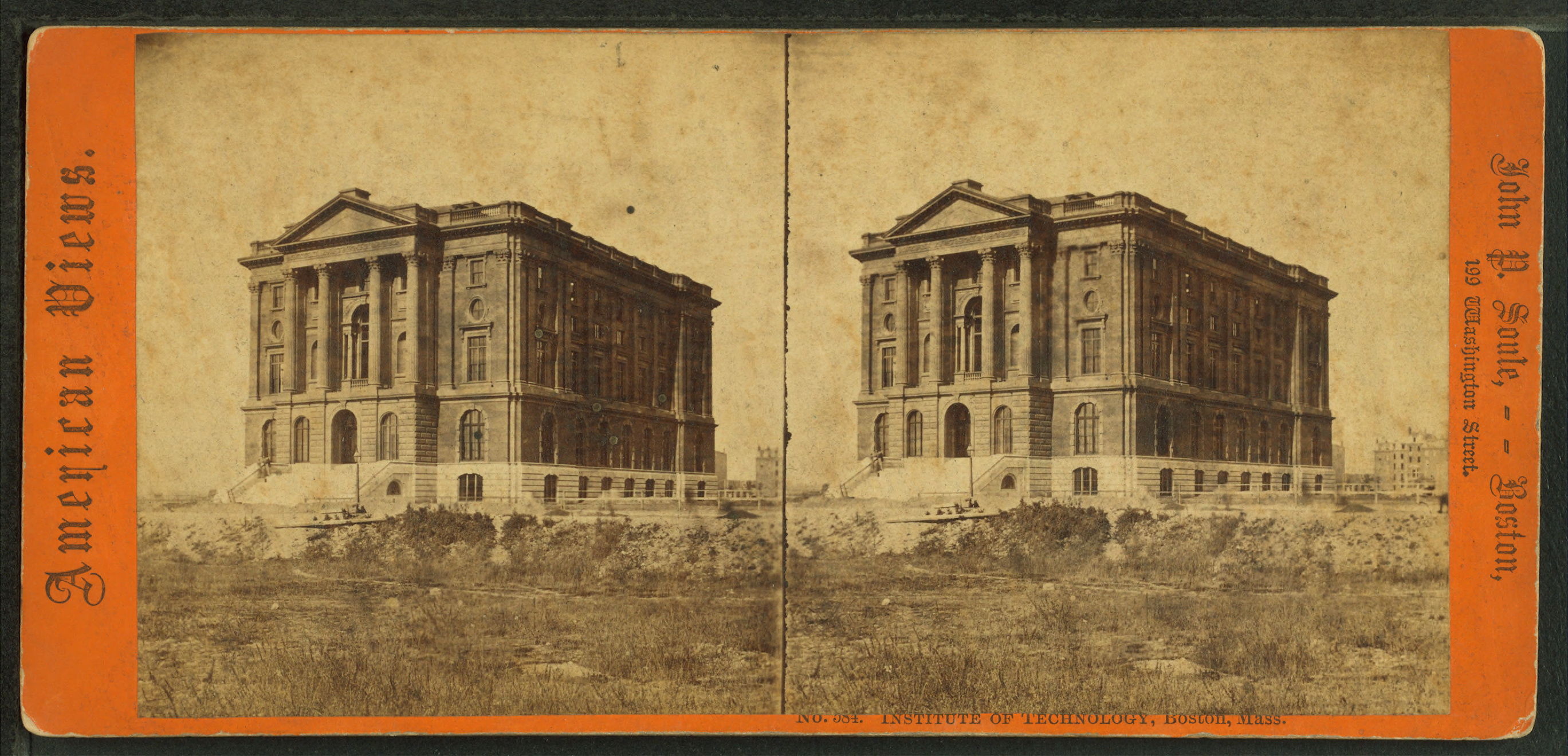
Institute of Technology, Boston

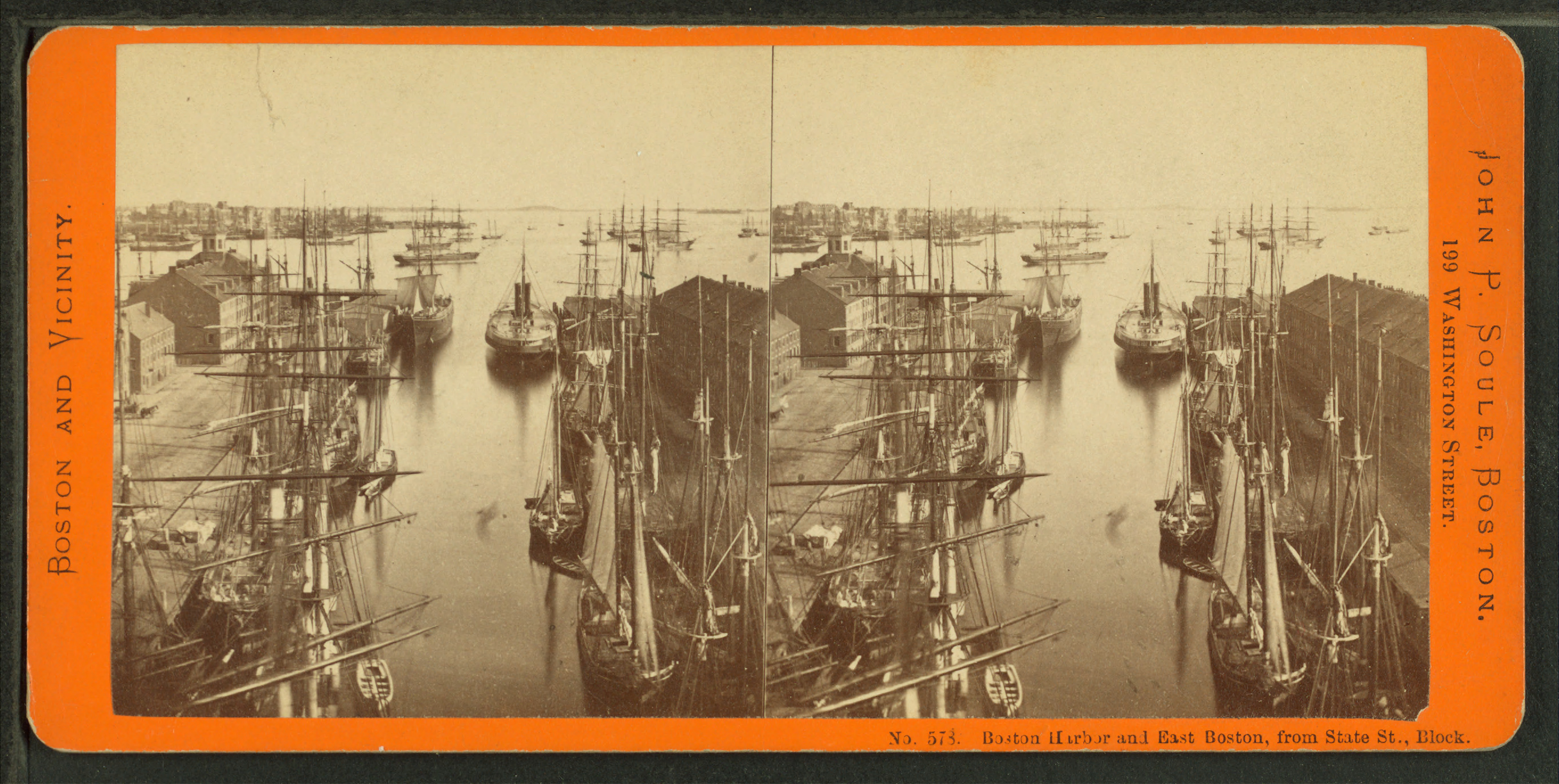
Boston Harbor

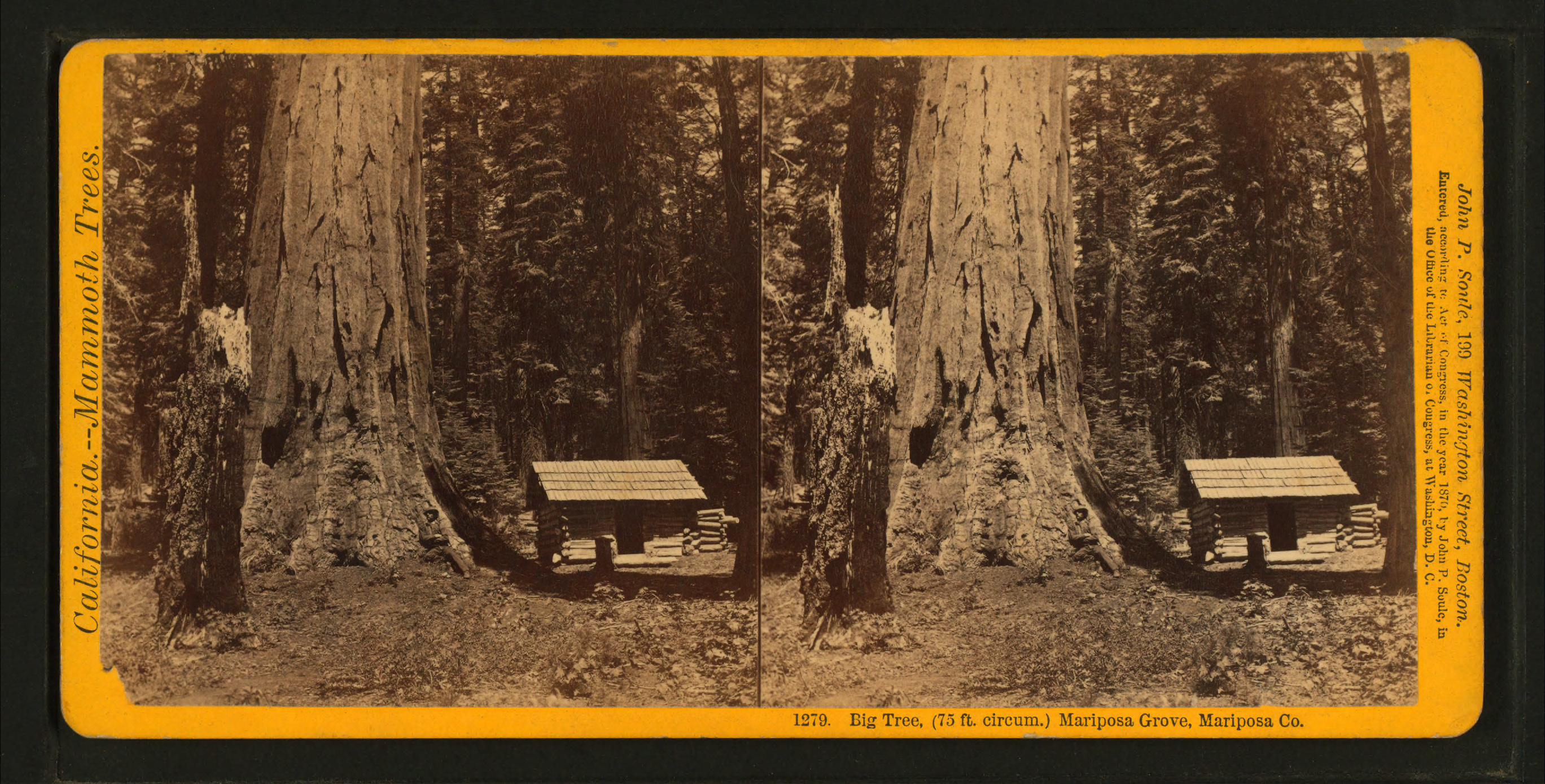
Mariposa Grove, California, 1870

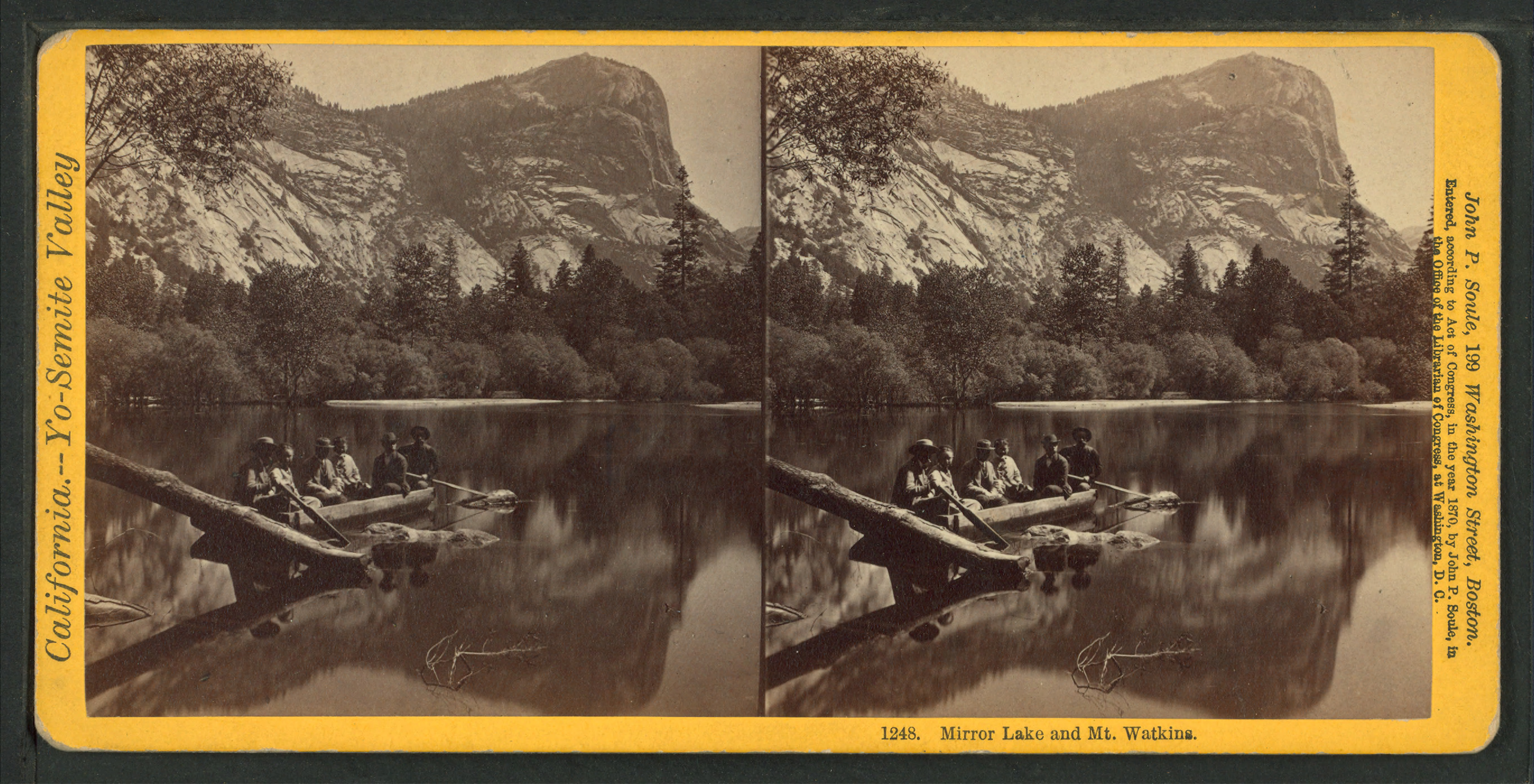
Mirror Lake and Mount Watkins, Yosemite Valley, California, 1870

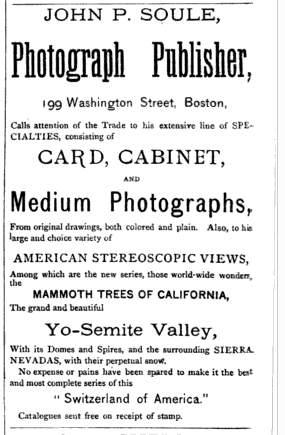
1872 advertisement
