= Mow-way =

Comanche leader (c. 1825–1886)

- Mo'o-wai
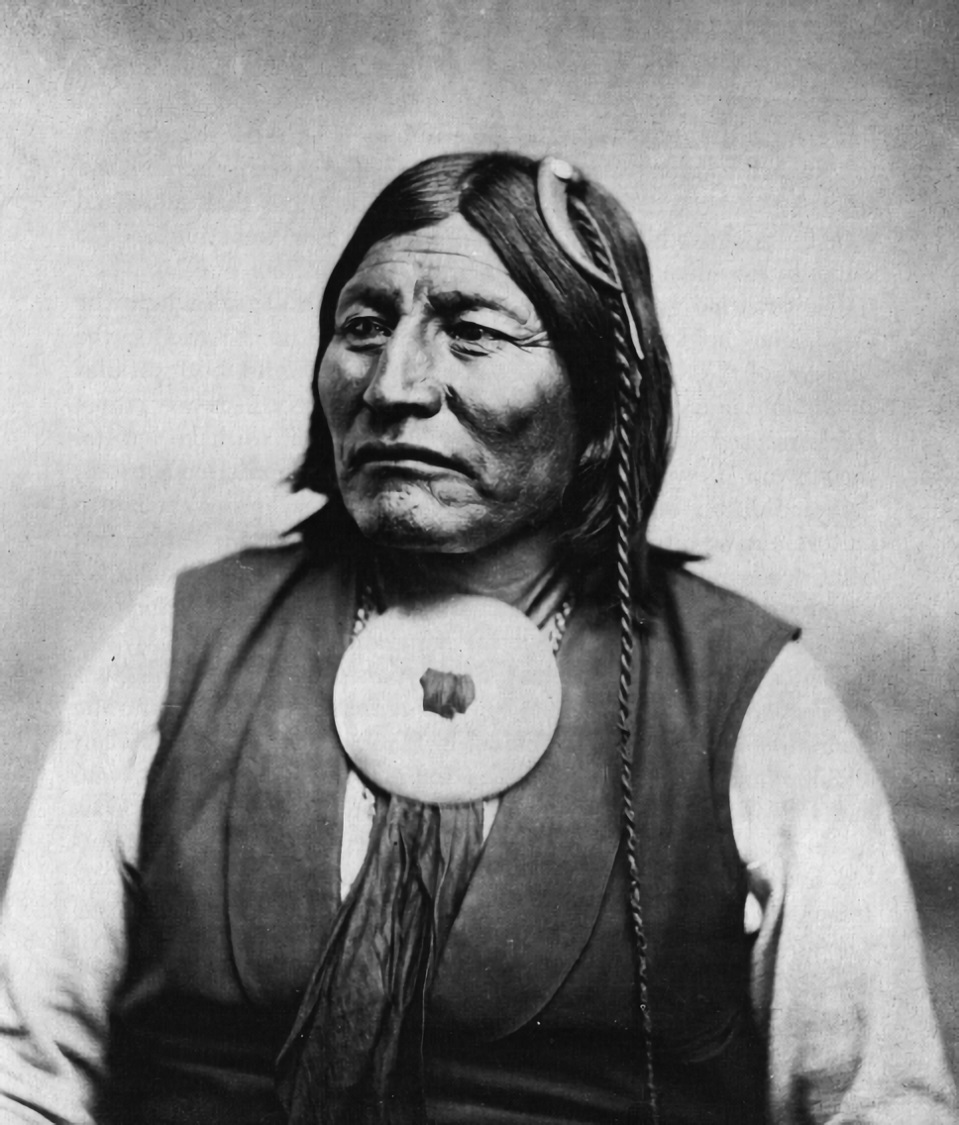
- Mow-way, c. 1874

Kotsoteka Comanche leader
- In office 1865–1878

Personal details
- Born: c. 1825 Comancheria
- Died: 1886
- Cause of death: Pneumonia
- Known for: 1865–1878 led the Kotsoteka Comanche tribe during the Texas–Indian wars

Mow-way or Moway (Comanche: Mo'o-wai, , lit. 'Pushing Aside' or 'Pushing-in-the-Middle'; c. 1825 – 1886) also referred to by European settlers as Shaking Hand or Hand Shaker, was the principal leader and war chief of the Kotsoteka band of the Comanche during the 1860s and 1870s, following the deaths of Kuhtsu-tiesuat (Little Buffalo) in 1864 and Tasacowadi (Big Cougar or Big Spotted Cat) in 1872.

== Raiding in Mexico ==
In 1849-1850 a band of Kotsotekas, led by Tabe-tipu (the shaman Sunrise) and her son Tabe-tuhka (Sundown or Under-the-Sun), with his own son (or younger brother) Mow-way raided Chihuahua State; the Chihuahuan Government set a bounty of 200 pesos on each Indian scalp (mostly Comanche, but Kiowa and Apache too) claiming an "extermination war" against them. In 1851 they made an agreement with the Kotsotekas, for their aid in taking Apache scalps. In 1851 Kotsotekas, having returned to the security at their rear, spread through Coahuila and Durango states and the bordering areas of Sonora and Sinaloa without hunting Apaches. Tabe-tuhka returned to Chihuahua leading 400 warriors, and Mow-way brought thousands of horses and cattle to Texas. In 1852 the Chihuahuan Kotsotekas gained 18,000 Pesos for Apache scalps, but in July Tabe-tuhka's Kotsotekas clashed with Mexican cavalry south of Durango, and, soon after this, Tabe-tuhka was killed by the Apache, and Mow-way became the leader.

== Fighting the Long Knives ==
Mow-way signed the Fort Cobb treaty in 1861 (along with Yamparika head chief Ten Bears, Nokoni head chief Quenah-evah (Eagle Drink), and second-ranking chief Horseback, and Penateka chiefs Tosahwi and Asa-havey). Several Comanche leaders met General Albert Pike (C.S.A.) and signed an allegiance with the Confederation. He signed the Medicine Lodge Treaty in October 1867.

On November 27, 1868, General Philip H. Sheridan's winter campaign led to the Washita Massacre. Lt. Col. George A. Custer's 7th Cavalry attacked and destroyed Motavato (Black Kettle)'s village, a Southern Cheyenne encampment on the Washita River in Oklahoma. The Kotsoteka and Big Red Meat's Nokoni band immediately intervened to help the Cheyenne. They fought and wiped out Major Joel Elliott's 7th U.S. Cavalry troop of 20 men. Andrew W. Evans' Canadian River campaigns between November - December 1868 against Kwahadi, Kotsoteka and Nokoni Comanche villages, forced Big Red Meat and Tahka's Nokoni, Mow-way's Kotsoteka, Pawʉʉra-ocoom's (Bull Bear) Kwahadi to surrender. In January 1869, Mow-way surrendered to Col. Benjamin Grierson. Grierson turned Mow-way over to Lawrie Tatum, the new Quaker agent at Fort Sill. Mow-way and the Kotsoteka soon left Fort Sill to rejoin their Kwahadi allies on the Staked Plains.

After May 1871, Mow-way and his band were associated with the hostile Kwahadi band, perhaps due to his associations among the Nokoni with old Horseback, as well as Peta Nocona (Lone Wanderer), Pawʉʉra-ocoom (Bull Bear), Kobay-o-burra (Wild Horse), Kobay-o-toho (Black Horse) and Peta Nocona's son, Quanah Parker.

== Red River attack ==
Colonel Ranald Mackenzie's troops attacked Mow-way's village near the North Fork of the Red River in Gray County, Texas, on September 28, 1872. That day: the 4th U.S. Cavalry under Mackenzie, attacked the Kotsotekas at Mow-way's village near McClellan Creek, while under subchief Kai-Wotche's leadership. The "battle" was an unanticipated assault on the village with the easy killing of 23 men, women, and children and the capture of between 120 -130 (124) women and children and more than 1.000 horses. The Army had managed to catch the camp by surprise, and most of the village's inhabitants were captured. The Kwahadi warriors led by Pawʉʉra-ocoom (Bull Bear), Kobay-oburra (Wild Horse) and Quanah Parker run from their encampments nearby and induced the soldiers to quickly retreat.

On the day after the attack, on September 29, the Kotsoteka and Kwahadi warriors attacked the military encampment and retrieved the horses, but not the women and children. The Comanche prisoners, 120-130 women and children, were kept under guard and were transferred to Fort Concho, where they were imprisoned throughout the winter.

Mackenzie used the captives as a bargaining tool to force the off-reservation Indians back to the reservation and to force the Indians to free white captives.

After the Red River battle. Mow-way and Pawʉʉra-ocoom moved their bands to the vicinity of the Wichita Agency. The Nokoni peaceful chief, Horseback (Kiyou), who had family members among the prisoners, persuaded the Comanches to trade stolen livestock and white captives in exchange for the captured women and children. Mow-way placed his camp near the agency and remained there until the release of the captives.

== Adobe Walls. Attack against buffalo hunters/Long Knives ==
Together with Quanah Parker (son to Peta Nocona), Kobay-oburra (Wild Horse) as Kwahadi war chiefs Isa-rosa (White Wolf), Tabananika (Sunrise's Voice), Tuwikaa-tiesuat and Isananica (both of them sons to Ten Bears) as Yamparika leaders, Big Red-meat as the Nokoni militant chief, also Mow-way and his Kotsoteka band took part in the attack against the buffalo hunters at Adobe Walls on June 27, 1874. The Indians were overpowered due to the opponents' high powered rifles and skilled marksmen. After the attack, Mow-way and the Kotsotekas hid in the Palo Duro Canyon, with their Kwahadi and Nokoni kinsmen and their Kiowa and Southern Cheyenne allies. Mackenzie's scouts discovered the hostile Comanche, Kiowa and Southern Cheyenne encampments in Palo Duro Canyon and attacked them on September 27, 1874. The Red River War ensued, ending in 1875 with the surrender of Mow-way and his fellow warriors at Fort Sill on April 28, 1875.

== Death of Mow-way ==
Mow-way died of pneumonia in 1886.

A portrait of Mow-way is included in the J. Paul Getty Museum.

== Sources ==
- Wallace, Ernest; Hoebel, E. Adamson (June 14, 2013). The Comanches: Lords of the South Plains. University of Oklahoma Press. ISBN 978-0-8061-5020-8.
- Schilz, Jodye Lynn Dickson; Schilz, Thomas F. (1989). Buffalo Hump and the Penateka Comanches. Texas Western Press. ISBN 978-0-87404-179-8.
- Branch, E. Douglas; Nye, W. S. (March 1938). "Carbine and Lance: The Story of Old Fort Sill". The Mississippi Valley Historical Review. 24 (4): 567. doi:10.2307/1947083. ISSN 0161-391X. JSTOR 1947083.
- Utley, Robert M.; Leckie, William H. (October 1968). "The Buffalo Soldiers: A Narrative of the Negro Cavalry in the West". Military Affairs. 32 (2): 88. doi:10.2307/1985558. ISSN 0026-3931. JSTOR 1985558.
- Hammet, Hugh B.; Fowler, Arlen L. (August 1972). "The Black Infantry in the West, 1869-1891". American Quarterly. 24 (3): 281. doi:10.2307/2711456. ISSN 0003-0678. JSTOR 2711456.
- Brown, Dee Alexander (1991). Bury My Heart at Wounded Knee: An Indian History of the American West. Vintage. ISBN 978-0-09-952640-7.
