= Tosahwi =

Comanche tribe chief

- Tosa Wihi̠
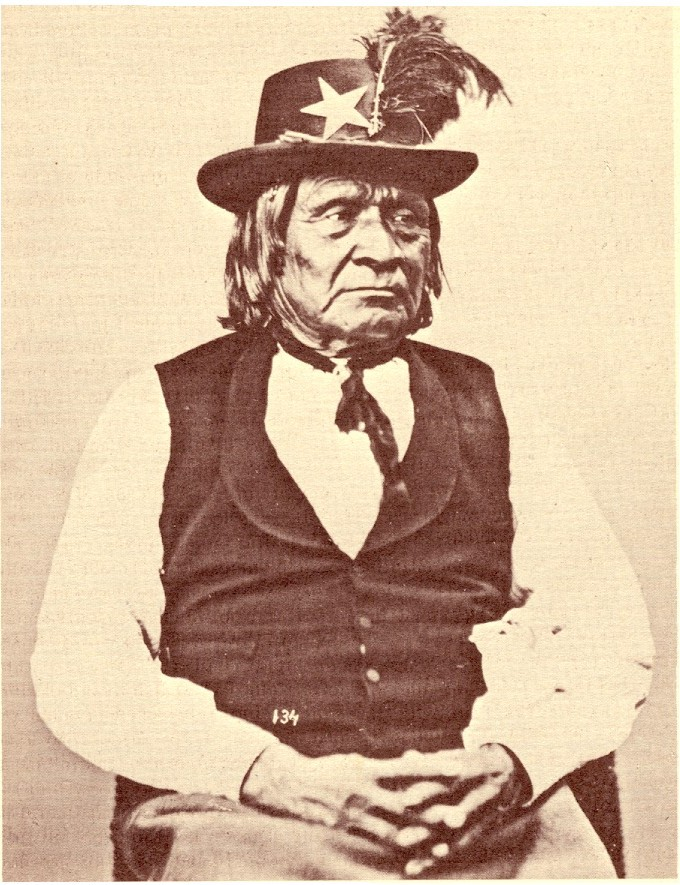
- Tosahwi in 1872

Penateka Comanche leader
- In office 1840–1870

Personal details
- Born: c. 1805-1810
- Died: c. 1878-1880 Anadarko Agency
- Known for: 1850–1870 as a peaceful chief, led the Penateka Comanche tribe during the last decade of the "Indian wars"

Tosahwi (Comanche: Tosa Wihi̠; c. 1805/10 – c.1878/80), meaning White Knife, was a Penateka Comanche chief. He was deemed "cooperative" by William Babcock Hazen.

== Young man: warrior and war chief ==
In January 1846, along with Amorous Man, Old Owl, Buffalo Hump, Yellow Wolf, Santa Anna, Ketumse, and Asa-havey ("Milky Way"), he signed the Treaty of Tehuacana Creek. After 1849, with the death of Old Owl and Santa Anna, the departure of Pah-hayoco (now settled, during his last years, as resident guest among the Kotsoteka band), and Buffalo Hump's becoming first chief and Yellow Wolf's becoming second chief of the Penateka Comanches until his own death in 1854, Tosahwi became one among the most important chiefs of the Penateka band, second to Ketumse in the reservation.

== Councils and treaties ==
In 1861, along with the Yamparika head chief Ten Bears, the Nokoni chief Horseback and his Penateka comrade Asa-havey, Tosahwi went to Fort Cobb where they met General Albert Pike (C.S.A.), and the Comanche chiefs (including the Nokoni head chief Quenah-evah, called "Eagle Drink" by the white people, and the Kotsoteka chief Mow-way) signed for an allegiance with the Confederation. As a leader of the Penateka band, Tosahwi engaged in many raids in the American Southwest in the 1860s, but in 1867–1868 he was the first Comanche leader to surrender to the military at Fort Cobb in the Indian Territory, and, on this occasion, he is reported to have had an alleged exchange with Philip Sheridan where Tosawhi stated "Me Tosawi. Me good Indian" and Sheridan purportedly replied by stating "The only good Indians I ever saw were dead", which is sometimes rephrased as "the only good Indian is a dead Indian." Sheridan denied ever making either statement. He signed as head chief of the Penateka the Medicine Lodge Treaty, and accepted to sit in a reservation, under the control of Fort Cobb, having the Comanche Agency in the Eureka Valley. He managed to keep out the Penateka, preventing their involvement in the Red River War in 1873–1874.

== Sources ==
- Wallace, Ernest & Hoebel, E. Adamson. The Comanche: Lords of the Southern Plains, University of Oklahoma Press, Norman, 1952
- Nye, Wilbur Sturtevant. Carbine and Lance: The Story of Old Fort Sill, University of Oklahoma Press, Norman, 1983
- Leckie, William H. The Buffalo Soldiers: A Narrative of the Negro Cavalry in the West, University of Oklahoma Press, Norman, 1967
- Fowler, Arlen L. The Black Infantry in the West, 1869-1891, University of Oklahoma Press, Norman, 1996
- Brown, Dee. Bury My Heart at Wounded Knee: An Indian History of the American West, Holt, Rinehart & Winston, New York, 1970
