= Fort Bascom =

New Mexico fort used during the Indian Wars

Coordinates: 35°19′04″N 103°42′12″W

Fort Bascom, established in 1863 in New Mexico Territory, is located on the Canadian River in Quay County, New Mexico, slightly west of the Texas border, 10 miles north of Tucumcari, New Mexico.

The fort was named in honor of Captain George Nicholas Bascom, who was killed during the American Civil War on February 21, 1862, while defending Fort Craig against Confederate forces in the Battle of Val Verde, New Mexico.

It was one of a series of forts established by General James Henry Carleton to control the Comanches and Kiowas who frequented the Staked Plains of Texas and the Rio Grande. It also was to stop trade of stolen goods by the so-called Comancheros.

Kit Carson engaged the Comanches and Kiowas in the First Battle of Adobe Walls in the heart of the Texas Panhandle.

The fort was abandoned in 1870.
